= List of ministers of transmigration (Indonesia) =

Minister of Transmigration

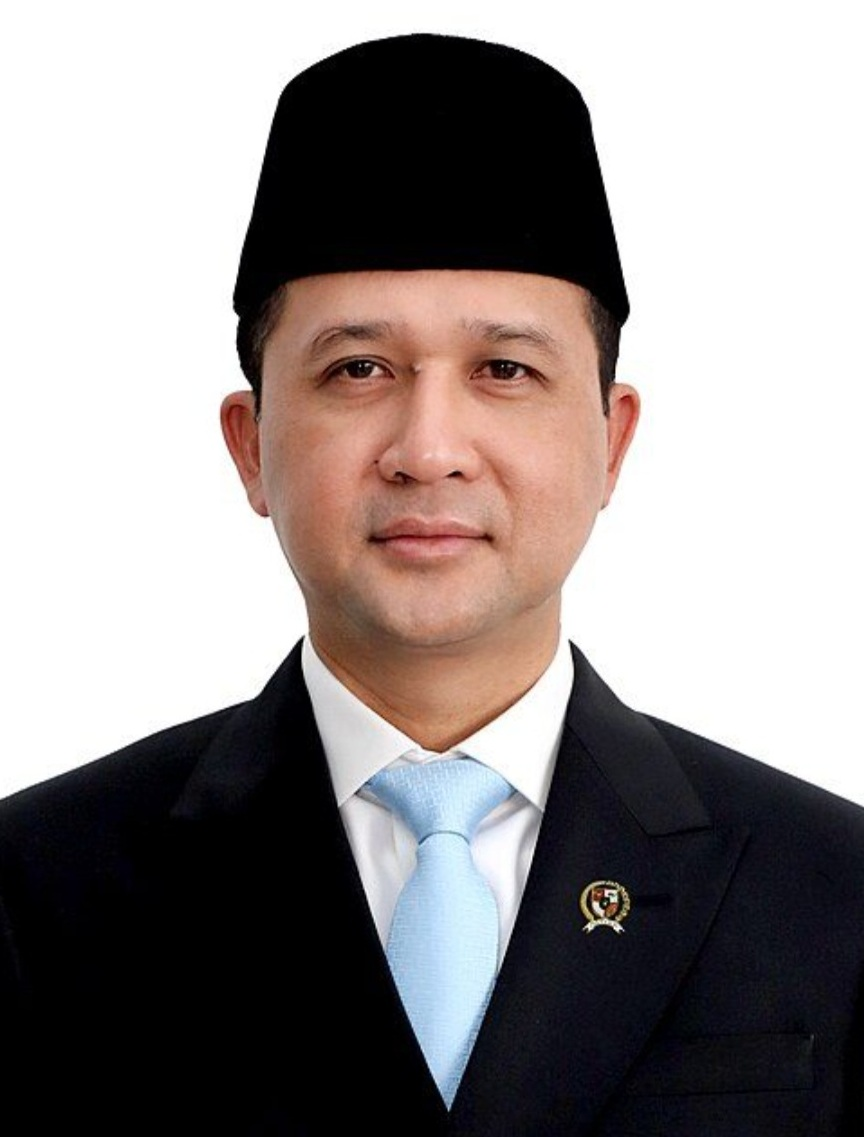
- Incumbent; Sulaiman Suryanagara since 21 October 2024
- Member of: Cabinet of Indonesia
- Appointer: President of Indonesia
- Inaugural holder: Ferdinand Lumban Tobing
- Formation: June 25, 1958; 68 years ago

The following is a list of the Minister of Transmigration.

| No | Photo | Name | Party | Cabinet | Took office | Left office | Note(s) |
|---|---|---|---|---|---|---|---|
| 1 | | Ferdinand Lumban Tobing | Indonesia; People's Union | Djuanda | 25 June 1958 | 5 July 1959 | (Note: Named State Minister of Transmigration Affair) |
| Under Minister of Development | | | | Working I | 10 July 1959 | 18 February 1960 | (Note: Named Junior Minister Transmigration/Cooperatives Village Community Development) |
| 2 | | Achmadi Hadisoemarto | Military | Working II | 18 February 1960 | 6 March 1962 | (Note: Named Minister of Transmigration, Cooperatives, and Village Community Development) |
| None | | | | Working III | 6 March 1962 | 13 November 1963 | |
| (2) | | Achmadi Hadisoemarto | Military | Working IV | 13 November 1963 | 27 August 1964 | |
| 3 | | Achadi | Independent | Dwikora I | 27 August 1964 | 27 March 1966 | (Note: Named Minister of Transmigration and Cooperatives) |
| 3 | | Achadi | Independent | Dwikora II | 27 August 1964 | 27 March 1966 | |
| 4 | | Sujono Suparto | Military | Dwikora III | 31 March 1966 | 25 July 1966 | (Note: Named Minister of Transmigration) |
| None | | | | Ampera I | 25 July 1966 | 17 October 1967 | (Note: Removed) |
| 5 | | Sarbini | Military | Ampera II | 17 October 1967 | 11 September 1971 | (Note: Named Minister of Transmigration, Veteran, and Demobilization) |
| 5 | | Sarbini | Military | Development I | 17 October 1967 | 11 September 1971 | |
| 6 | | Subroto | Independent | Development I | 11 September 1971 | 23 March 1973 | |
| Merged to Minister of Labor, Transmigration, and Cooperatives | | | | Development II | 28 March 1973 | 23 March 1978 | |
| Under Minister of Labor and Transmigration | | | | Development III | 29 March 1978 | 11 March 1983 | |
| 7 | | Martono | Golkar | Development IV | 19 March 1983 | 11 March 1988 | |
| 8 | | Soegiarto | Golkar | Development V | 21 March 1988 | 11 March 1993 | |
| 9 | | Siswono Yudohusodo | Golkar | Development VI | 17 March 1993 | 11 March 1998 | |
| 10 | | Abdullah Mahmud Hendropriyono | Golkar | Development VII | 14 March 1998 | 21 May 1998 | (Note: Named Minister of Transmigration and Forest Encroacher Settlement) |
| 10 | | Abdullah Mahmud Hendropriyono | Golkar | Development Reform | 23 May 1998 | 20 October 1999 | |
| 11 | | Al Hilal Hamdi | National; Mandate | National Unity | 29 October 1999 | 23 August 2000 | (Note: Named State Minister Transmigration and Population) |
| Merged to Minister of Labor and Transmigration | | | | National Unity | 23 August 2000 | 20 October 2014 | |
| Merged to Minister of Labor and Transmigration | | | | Mutual Assistance | 23 August 2000 | 20 October 2014 | |
| Merged to Minister of Labor and Transmigration | | | | United Indonesia I | 23 August 2000 | 20 October 2014 | |
| Merged to Minister of Labor and Transmigration | | | | United Indonesia II | 23 August 2000 | 20 October 2014 | |
| Merged to Minister of Village, Development of Disadvantaged Region, and Transmigration | | | | Working | 27 October 2014 | 20 October 2024 | |
| Merged to Minister of Village, Development of Disadvantaged Region, and Transmigration | | | | Onward Indonesia | 27 October 2014 | 20 October 2024 | |
| 12 | | Sulaiman Suryanagara | Democratic | Red and White | 21 October 2024 | Incumbent | |

Note(s)

== See also ==
- Ministry of Transmigration
