= Djuanda Cabinet =

Indonesian cabinet

Djuanda Cabinet Kabinet Djuanda
- 18th Cabinet of Indonesia
- 1957–1959
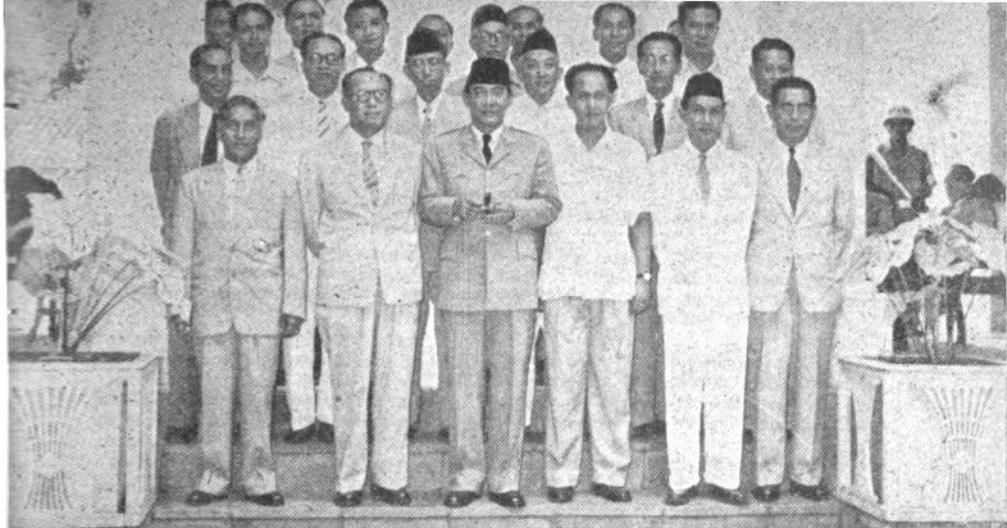
- Date formed: 9 April 1957
- Date dissolved: 10 July 1959

People and organisations
- President: Sukarno
- Prime Minister: Djuanda Kartawidjaja
- Deputy Prime Minister: Hardi; Idham Chalid; Johannes Leimena (from 29 April 1957)
- No. of ministers: 28
- Member party: Indonesian National Party; Nahdlatul Ulama; Masyumi; Indonesian Islamic Union Party; League of Supporters of Indonesian Independence; Indonesian Christian Party (SKI); Independent

History
- Predecessor: Ali Sastroamidjojo II Cabinet
- Successor: Working I Cabinet

The Djuanda Cabinet (Indonesian: Kabinet Djuanda), also known as the Working Cabinet (Indonesian: Kabinet Karya), was an Indonesian cabinet that served from 9 April 1957 until 10 July 1959, when it was dissolved by a decree from President Sukarno.

== Background ==
On 14 March 1957, the Second Ali Sastroamidjojo Cabinet collapsed as a result of pressure from regional rebellions, splits between the parties comprising it and attacks on the political system, which led to the resignations of members. President Sukarno had expressed his desire for a gotong royong (mutual assistance) cabinet, in which the four major parties, including the Communist Party of Indonesia (PKI) would work together in the national interest. However, following vociferous opposition from the other parties and the Army, Sukarno was forced to back down. On 15 March, he asked Indonesian National Party chairman Suwirjo to form a cabinet, but he failed, with the result that Sukarno himself called a meeting on 14 April of party leaders and military officers, at which they were all asked if they were prepared to join the cabinet. The Masyumi Party, most of whose members refused to serve in the cabinet, accused Sukarno of acting illegally, but to no avail. The party later expelled its two members who joined the cabinet. Sukarno appointed cabinet veteran Djuanda Kartawidjaja to head a cabinet made up of qualified individuals who did not represent any parties. The cabinet was announced on 8 April and appointed by Sukarno the following day at the Merdeka Palace.

== Composition ==
=== Cabinet leadership ===
- Prime Minister: Djuanda Kartawidjaja
- First Deputy Prime Minister: Hardi (Indonesian National Party – PNI)
- Second Deputy Prime Minister: Idham Chalid (Nahdlatul Ulama - NU)

=== Cabinet members ===
- Minister of Foreign Affairs: Subandrio
- Minister of Home Affairs: Sanoesi Hardjadinata (Indonesian National Party – PNI)
- Minister of Defense : Djuanda
- Minister of Justice: G. A. Maengkom (Indonesian National Party – PNI)
- Minister of Information: Soedibjo (Indonesian Islamic Union Party - PSII)
- Minister of Finance: Sutikno Slamet (Indonesian National Party – PNI)
- Minister of Agriculture: Sadjarwo Djarwonagoro (Indonesian National Party – PNI)
- Minister of Trade: Sunardjo (Nahdlatul Ulama - NU)
- Minister of Industry: F. J. Inkiriwang
- Minister of Transport: Sukardan
- Minister of Maritime Transport: Captain (Navy) Mohammad Nazir
- Minister of Public Works and Power: Pangeran Mohammad Noor (Masyumi Party)
- Minister of Labor: Samjono
- Minister of Social Affairs: Johannes Leimena (Parkindo)
- Minister of Education & Culture: Prijono (Murba Party)
- Minister of Religious Affairs: Mohammad Iljas (Nahdlatul Ulama - NU)
- Minister of Health: Col. Dr. Azis Saleh (League of Supporters of Indonesian Independence - IPKI)
- Minister of Agrarian Affairs: Sunarjo (Nahdlatul Ulama - NU)
- Minister for Mobilization of the People and Development: A. M. Hanafi (People's Congress)
- State Minister for Veteran Affairs: Chairul Saleh
- State Minister for Relations between the Regions: F. L. Tobing (SKI)

== Changes ==
- Social Minister Leimena was appointed Third Deputy Prime Minister on 29 April 1957. On the same day, Chairul Saleh and F. L. Tobing were promoted to full ministers, meaning there were no longer any state ministers. Muljadi Djojomartono was appointed to replace Leimena as Social Affairs Minister on 25 May.
- A number of changes took place on 25 June 1958. Trade Minister Sunardjo was replaced by party colleague Rachmat Muljomiseno, Mobilization of the People and Development Minister A. M. Hanafi was appointed State Minister and Relations between the Regions Minister F. L. Tobing was appointed Transmigration Minister. Three new posts were created: Col. Suprajogi was appointed State Minister for the Stabilization of the economy; Wahib Wahab (NU) was appointed State Minister for Civil-Military Cooperation and Muhammad Yamin was appointed State Minister.
