= Women's Corps =

Women's Corps means an army's corps or branch where all members are women.

Women's Corps or variation may refer to one of the following:

Active military units

- Indonesian Army Women's Corps, active since 1961
- Sri Lanka Army Women's Corps, active since 1979
- Gender Affairs Advisor (Women's Affairs Advisor until 2016), an Israel Defense Forces position following the 2001 disbanding of its Women's Corps

Defunct military units

- Canadian Women's Army Corps, active between World War II and 1964
- Merlinettes (formally Women's Signal Corps), active between 1942 and 1945
- Queen Mary's Army Auxiliary Corps (Women's Army Auxiliary Corps until 1918), active between 1917 and 1921
- Royal Netherlands Army Women's Auxiliary Corps, active between 1943 and 1952
- Royal Netherlands East Indies Army Women's Corps, active between 1944 and 1950
- Women's Army Corps, active between 1942 and 1978
- Women's Auxiliary Army Corps (New Zealand) (New Zealand Women's Royal Army Corps after 1952), active between 1942 and 1977
- Women's Auxiliary Corps (India), active between 1942 and 1947
- Women's Emergency Signalling Corps, active between 1939 and 1954
- Women's Radio Corps, active between 1918 and 1919
- Women's Reserve Ambulance Corps, active between 1915 and 1919
- Women's Reserve Camouflage Corps, active between 1918 and 1919
- Women's Royal Army Corps, active between 1949 and 1992
- Women's Royal Australian Army Corps, active between 1951 and 1984
- Women's Volunteer Corps, active between 1944 and 1945

Active civil organisations

- Woman's Relief Corps, active since 1883

Defunct civil organisations

- Women's Forage Corps, active between 1917 and 1920
- Women's Timber Corps, active between 1942 and 1946
