= Ministry of Transmigration =

Government ministry of Indonesia

Ministry of Transmigration of the Republic of Indonesia
- Kementerian Transmigrasi Republik Indonesia
- Seal of the Ministry of Transmigration

- Logo of the Ministry of Transmigration

Ministry overview
- Formed: 25 June 1958 as Office of the State Minister for Transmigration Affairs
- Jurisdiction: Government of Indonesia
- Headquarters: Jalan Abdul Muis No.7 Jakarta Pusat 10110 Jakarta, Indonesia
- Motto: Kesejahteraan untuk semua (Prosperity for all)
- Minister responsible: Muhammad Iftitah Sulaiman Suryanagara, Minister of Transmigration
- Parent department: Coordinating Ministry for Infrastructure and Regional Development
- Website: www.transmigrasi.go.id

The Ministry of Transmigration of the Republic of Indonesia (Indonesian: Kementerian Transmigrasi Republik Indonesia; abbreviated as Kementrans) is an Indonesian government ministry that is responsible for transmigration affairs. The ministry reports to the president and is currently led by Muhammad Iftitah Sulaiman Suryanagara, the minister of transmigration.

== History ==
The ministry has undergone several changes in nomenclature, whether it stood alone, was combined with other ministries or was abolished. The ministry was first established by Indonesian prime minister Djuanda Kartawidjaja in the Djuanda Cabinet. The ministry was then reinstated by Indonesian president Prabowo Subianto in the Red and White Cabinet on October 21, 2024.

== Organizational structure ==
Based on the Presidential Decree 172/2024 and as expanded by the Ministry of Transmigration Decree No. 1/2024 and 4/2025, the organizational structure of the Ministry consists of:

1. Office of the Ministry of Transmigration
2. Office of the Deputy Ministry of Transmigration
3. General Secretariat
  1. Bureau of Planning, Collaborations, and Public Relations
  2. Bureau of Finance and State-owned Assets
  3. Bureau of Organization, Human Resources, and Bureaucracy Reform
  4. Bureau of Law
  5. Bureau of General Affairs and Procurement
4. Directorate General of Construction and Development of Transmigration Areas (Directorate General I)
  1. Directorate General of Construction and Development of Transmigration Areas Secretariat
  2. Directorate of Planning of Transmigration Areas
  3. Directorate of Construction of Transmigration Areas
  4. Directorate of Population Distribution in Transmigration Areas
  5. Directorate of Settlement and Civic Center Development in Transmigration Areas
  6. Directorate of Transmigration Areas Development
5. Directorate General of Economic Development and Community Empowerment Transmigration (Directorate General II)
  1. Directorate General of Economic Development and Community Empowerment Transmigration Secretariat
  2. Directorate of Technical Planning for Economic Development and Community Empowerment in Transmigration Areas
  3. Directorate of Economical Institutions Development
  4. Directorate of Competitive Products Development
  5. Directorate of Products Promotion and Marketing
  6. Directorate of Community Empowerment
6. Inspectorate General
  1. Inspectorate General Secretariat
  2. Inspectorate I
  3. Inspectorate II
7. Centers
  1. Center for Transmigration Strategic Policies
  2. Center for Transmigration Data and Information
  3. Center for Transmigration Human Resources Development
    1. Indonesian Center for Transmigration Training and Community Empowerment, Yogyakarta
    2. Indonesian Institute for Transmigration Training and Community Empowerment, Pekanbaru
    3. Indonesian Institute for Transmigration Training and Community Empowerment, Banjarmasin
    4. Indonesian Institute for Transmigration Training and Community Empowerment, Denpasar
8. Expert Staff for Development, Society and the Environment
9. Expert Staff for Political and Legal Affairs

== List of Ministers ==
1. Ferdinand Lumban Tobing (1958–1959)
2. Achmadi Hadisoemarto (1959–1962; 1963–1964)
3. Achadi (1964–1966)
4. Sujono Suparto (1966)
5. Sarbini (1967–1971)
6. Subroto (1971–1973)
7. Martono (1983–1988)
8. Soegiarto (1988–1993)
9. Siswono Yudohusodo (1993–1998)
10. A. M. Hendropriyono (1998–1999)
11. Al Hilal Hamdi (1999–2000)
12. M. Iftitah Sulaiman (2024–present)

== See also ==
- Transmigration program
