= Korps Speciale Troepen =

Special Forces Corps
- Korps Speciale Troepen
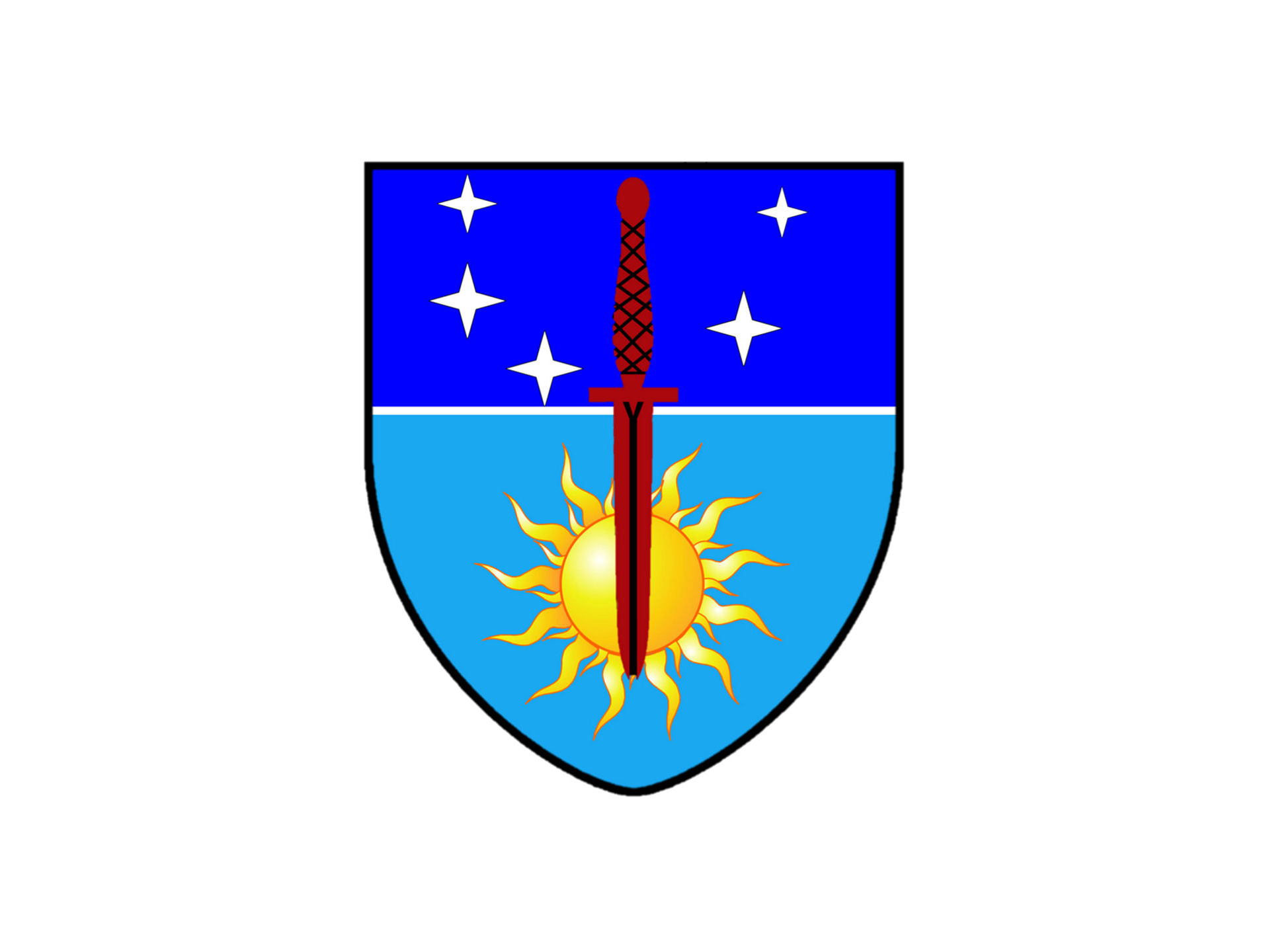
- Active: 1948–1950
- Disbanded: 1950
- Country: Netherlands
- Branch: Royal Netherlands East Indies Army
- Type: Special forces
- Size: 570
- Engagements: Indonesian National Revolution; Operation Kraai; Siege of Surakarta

Commanders
- Notable commanders: See list below

Korps Speciale Troepen (KST; 'Special Forces Corps') was a Royal Netherlands East Indies Army (KNIL) special forces unit that was established for deployment against the Indonesian revolutionaries during the Indonesian National Revolution. It was formed in 1948 with the Depot Speciale Troepen (DST; 'Special Forces Depot') at its core and disbanded alongside the Royal Netherlands East Indies Army in 1950, by which time it had been renamed to the Regiment Speciale Troepen (RST; 'Special Forces Regiment'). The DST consisted of about 570 men at its establishment in 1945 and had a precursor in the Korps Insulinde ('Insulindia Corps') that conducted clandestine operations during the Japanese occupation of the Dutch East Indies. In June 1949, 250 men of the 1st Parachute Company were integrated into the Corps. The KST, which would reach a maximum strength of 1250 men, was composed of Dutch war volunteers (OVWs), Eurasians and native soldiers, including Moluccans. The present day Korps Commandotroepen (KCT; 'Commando Corps') of the Royal Netherlands Army is considered a continuation of the RST.

== The green and red berets ==
The forces wore the green beret, which was the official headdress of the British Commandos of World War II. Under the name No. 2 (Dutch) Troop, the first Dutch commandos were trained in Achnacarry, Scotland, as part of No. 10 (Inter-Allied) Commando. After the war, members of No. 2 Dutch troop served in DST. The paratrooper wing of the Corps wore the red beret.

== Operations ==
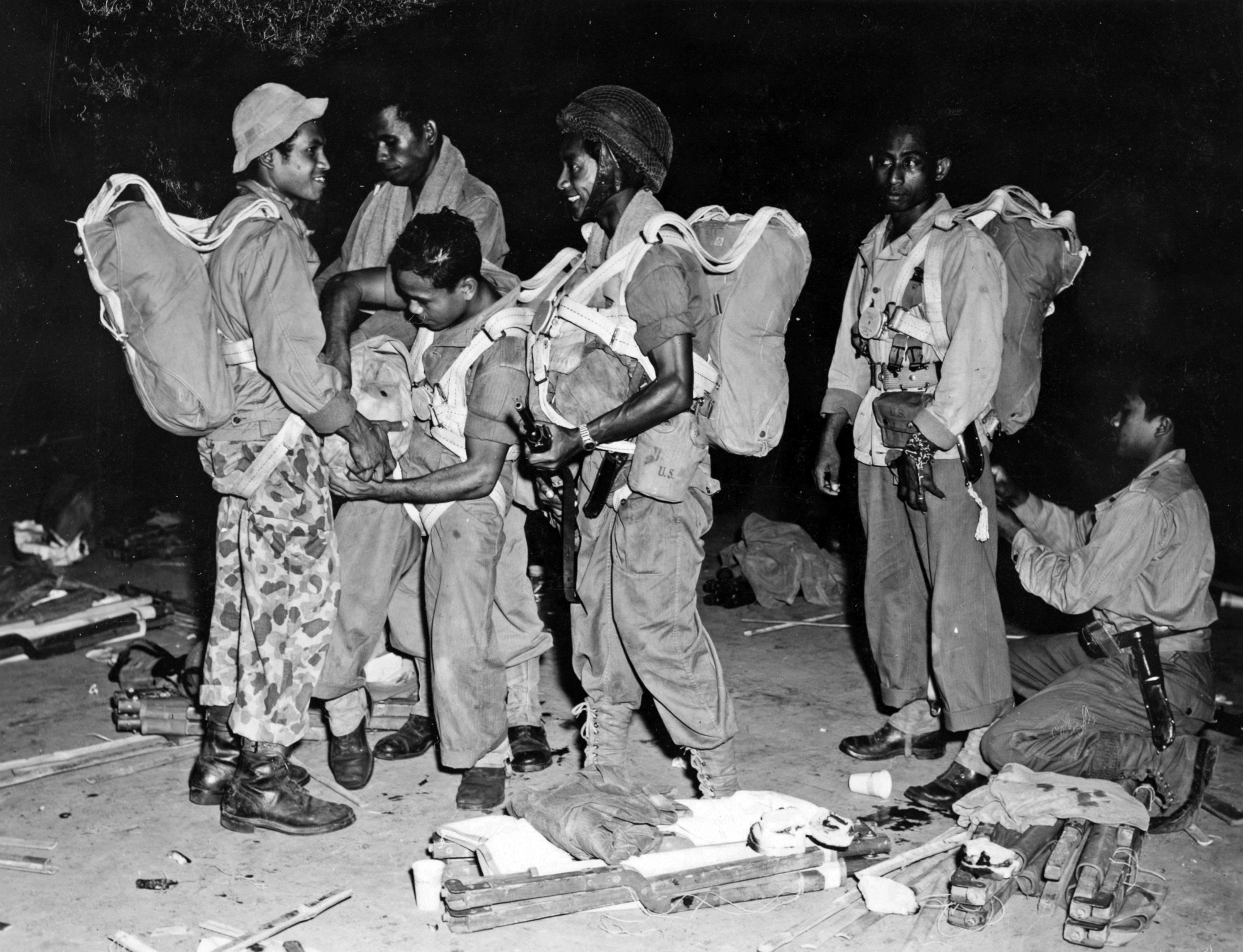
Paratroopers of the KST preparing for an action, 1948

At the end of 1946, the DST under Captain Raymond Westerling was deployed to South Celebes to restore Dutch authority in the area. The local Indonesian nationalists, utilizing terror tactics, tried to prevent the return of Dutch rule. Westerling led a controversial counterterrorism campaign that would become known as the "South Celebes Affair," in which thousands of suspected nationalists were killed.

The DST/KST then focused on anti-guerrilla operations, capture or kill high-value targets, counterinsurgency, irregular warfare, operating in difficult to access and dangerous areas, and special operations. The rich tradition of the KNIL in this field, combined with the skills of the modern commando, turned out to be a recipe for success. When the Indonesian nationalists turned to guerrilla warfare, the special forces were increasingly called upon and the revolutionaries learned to avoid confrontations with units of the KST as much as possible. This was not only a matter of survival, as the Indonesian fighters were no match for the seasoned commandos of the KST, but also a matter of tactics. When the troops of the KST left an area for operations elsewhere, the nationalists simply returned to resume their guerrilla actions against Dutch regulars.

The KST paratroopers performed a number of airborne operations. At the beginning of Operation Kraai in late 1948, they captured the airport of the Republican capital of Yogyakarta as a prelude to the Dutch capture of the city and the imprisonment of the Indonesian leadership, including President Sukarno.

Exemplary of the qualitative advantage of the KST/RST over the fighters of the Tentara Nasional Indonesia (TNI; 'Indonesian National Military') was the final operation of the RST prior to the Dutch–Indonesian Round Table Conference in August 1949. The TNI made a last-ditch attempt before the ceasefire to infiltrate Surakarta in Central Java. 325 men from the RST were hastily flown in to repel the TNI from the city. The Siege of Surakarta was resolved in a few days with the TNI losing around 400 men, while the RST only suffered three injuries. It cannot be ruled out that a number of civilian casualties were included in the losses of the TNI.

After the transfer of sovereignty and official end of hostilities, the commandos of the RST sprung into action one last time, albeit without the consent of their superiors. A number of them were involved in an attempted coup d'état against the regime of Sukarno in January 1950, as part of the Angkatan Perang Ratu Adil (APRA; 'Just Ruler Legion') led by former Captain Raymond Westerling.

== Paratrooper Training School ==
After World War II, the School Opleiding Parachutisten (SOP; 'Paratrooper Training School') was located at Andir airfield near Bandung, West Java. The SOP was the school that trained the paratroopers of the Korps Speciale Troepen.

== Commanders ==
- Captain W.J. Scheepens, 1946 (incapacitated)
- Captain R.P.P. Westerling, 1946–1948 (discharged)
- Lieutenant colonel W.C.A. van Beek, 1948–1949
- Lieutenant colonel J.J.F. Borghouts, 1949–1950

=== Notable members ===
- Lieutenant colonel J.C.A. Faber, Knight of the Military Order of William for actions during the Dutch East Indies campaign of World War II
- Lieutenant colonel M.P.A. den Ouden, Knight of the Military Order of William (posthumous) for actions in the Battle of Hoengsong during the Korean War
- Captain J.H.C. Ulrici, Knight of the Military Order of William for actions in the Dutch resistance during World War II and as commander of the counter-insurgency unit Compagnie Eric during the Indonesian National Revolution
- Captain R.B. Visser, eventually became Indonesian officer and first commander of Kopassus
- Lieutenant G.J. Schüssler, Knight of the Military Order of William for actions during the Indonesian National Revolution
- Lieutenant L.M. Snijders, Knight of the Military Order of William for actions in Operation Kraai during the Indonesian National Revolution
- Warrant officer C. Plaatzer , Knight of the Military Order of William for actions in Operation Kraai during the Indonesian National Revolution
- Sergeant major F.F. Ormskerk, Surinamese officer and opponent of the military dictatorship of Dési Bouterse
- Sergeant Thomas Nussy, participated in South Sulawesi campaign of 1946–1947, later became Chief of Staff of APRMS, pardoned and joined TNI, later participated in Operation Trikora, retired with the rank Major.

== Bibliography ==
- Conboy, Kenneth J. (2003). Kopassus: inside Indonesia's special forces. London: Equinox Publishing. ISBN 979-95898-8-6.
- Dominique Venner, Westerling, "de eenling" Nederlands 399 pagina's 1e druk januari 1982 ISBN 9061227143
