= National Museum of Transmigration =

Indonesian museum

Coordinates: 5.3776°S 105.1072°E

The National Museum of Transmigration is a national museum in Lampung Province, Indonesia that documents historical records about the transmigration program in Indonesia. Built on an area of 63 ha (0.63 km^{2}), it is the world's first and only transmigration museum. The museum has three floors and ten pavilions for traditional houses from the areas of origin of the transmigrants.

The development of the National Museum of Transmigration aims to provide facilities and infrastructure for studying the transmigration program in Indonesia.

== History ==
The construction of the National Museum of Transmigration began on December 12, 2004, which was the 54th Transmigration Service Day. The laying of the first stone was carried out by the 9th Governor of Lampung, Sjachroedin Zainal Pagaralam.

The National Museum of Transmigration commemorates Lampung as a colonial area ruled by the Dutch East Indies government in 1905.
