= Ministry of Villages and Development of Disadvantaged Regions =

Government ministry of Indonesia

- Kementerian Desa dan Pembangunan Daerah Tertinggal
- Seal of the Ministry of Villages and Development of Disadvantaged Regions

- Flag of the Ministry of Villages and Development of Disadvantaged Regions

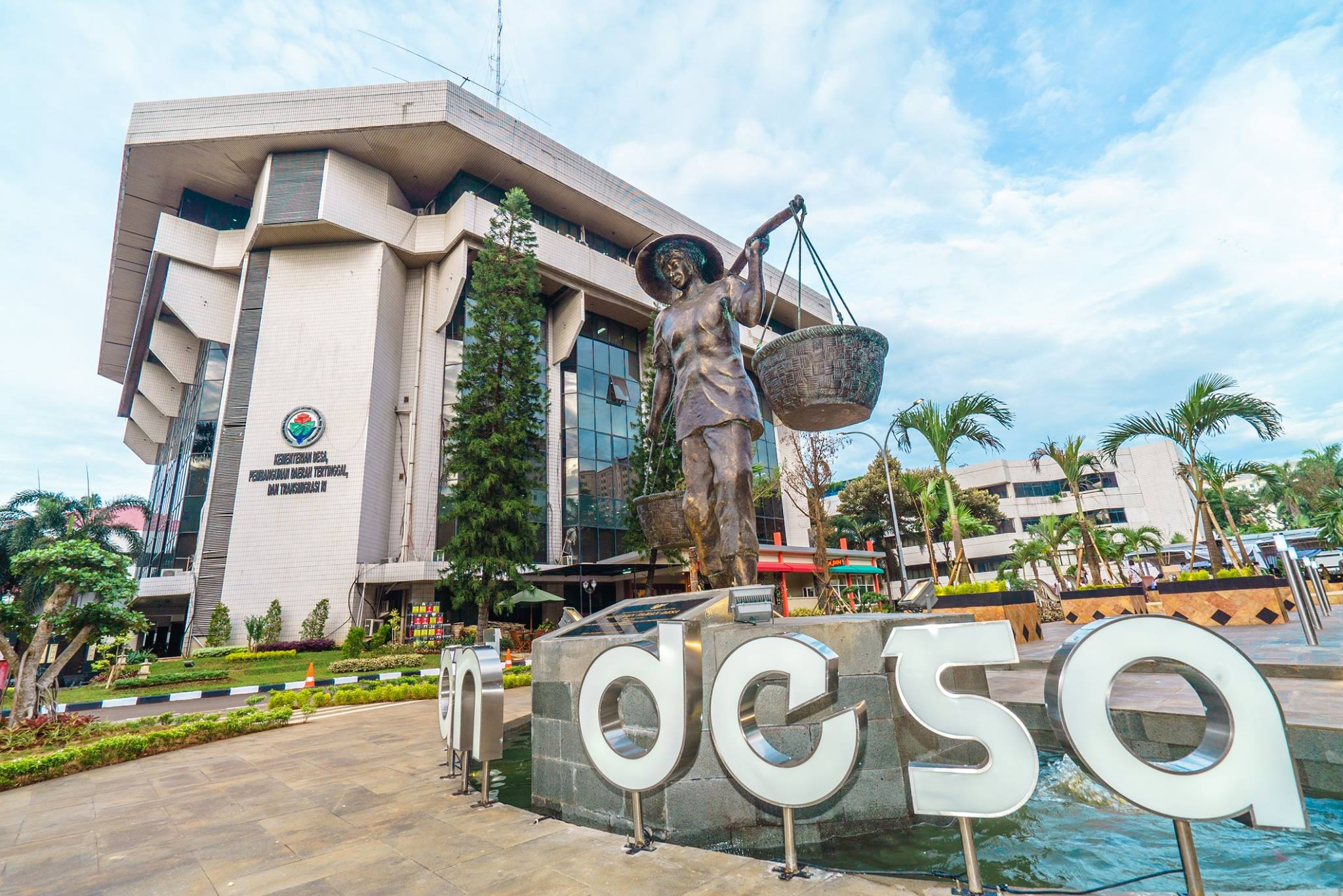
- Ministry of Villages and Development of Disadvantaged Regions headquarters

Ministry overview
- Formed: 26 August 2000; 27 October 2014 (current form)
- Preceding agencies: Ministry for the Development of Disadvantaged Regions; Directorate General of Guidance and Development of Transmigration Areas, Ministry of Manpower; Directorate General of Village Community Empowerment, Ministry of Home Affairs
- Jurisdiction: Government of Indonesia
- Headquarters: Jl. TMP Kalibata No.17, Jakarta Pusat 12750 Jakarta, Indonesia
- Minister responsible: Yandri Susanto, Minister of Villages and Development of Disadvantaged Regions
- Website: www.kemendesa.go.id

The Ministry of Villages and Development of Disadvantaged Regions (Indonesian: Kementerian Desa dan Pembangunan Daerah Tertinggal, abbreviated as Kemendesa PDT) is a government ministry tasked with assisting the President in developing rural and disadvantaged areas in Indonesia. Through its community development, it would help to speed up the development of villages. The ministry was also responsible for the transmigration program until late 2024, when Ministry of Transmigration is restored.

== History ==
Development of disadvantaged regions programs was started under the Abdurrahman Wahid presidency. At that time, the post of Undersecretariat of Acceleration of Development in Eastern Indonesia Affairs of the Republic of Indonesia (Indonesia: Menteri Muda Urusan Percepatan Pembangunan Kawasan Timur Indonesia Republik Indonesia) created by him through Presidential Decision No. 234/M/2000 on reformation of National Unity Cabinet after the first reshuffle of his cabinet on 23 August 2000. Unlike undersecretary which normally positioned under a ministry in another countries, the undersecretariat office was directly under the President and this situation commonly happened in Indonesia up until prior Megawati Soekarnoputri presidency. The office firstly held by Manuel Kaisiepo [id]. Despite being under the President, the office does not have certain degree of freedom on its own. For financing the undersecretariat activities, the office was financed through Coordinating Ministry for Economic Affairs fund as written in the undersecretariat constituting document, Presidential Decree No. 164/2000. For program planning and execution, the office must be under Coordinating Ministry for Political, Legal, and Security Affairs supervision and gaining approval from Ministry of State Apparatus Utilization and Bureaucratic Reform as mandated in Presidential Decree No. 176/2000.

After Megawati Soekarnoputri took the presidency, the post retained by Manuel Kaisiepo, and the office elevated to State Ministry for the Acceleration of Development in Eastern Indonesia (Indonesia: Kementerian Negara Percepatan Pembangunan Kawasan Timur Indonesia). When Susilo Bambang Yudhoyono took the presidency after 2004 Indonesian presidential election, the office later upgraded to the State Ministry for the Acceleration of Development of Disadvantaged Regions (Indonesia: Kementerian Negara Percepatan Pembangunan Daerah Tertinggal), and the office of the ministry retained the name until 9 May 2007 with Saifullah Yusuf as the minister. Since then, the office not only covered the Eastern Indonesia but whole disadvantaged regions of Indonesia. The ministry renamed into the State Ministry for the Development of Disadvantaged Regions (Indonesia: Kementerian Negara Pembangunan Daerah Tertinggal) and retained its name until 20 October 2009. During the second presidency of Susilo Bambang Yudhoyono, the office renamed into Ministry for the Development of Disadvantaged Regions (Indonesia: Kementerian Pembangunan Daerah Tertinggal) on 19 October 2011.

When Joko Widodo took the presidency after 2014 Indonesian presidential election, the ministry structure later expanded by combining the Ministry for the Development of Disadvantaged Regions, Directorate General of Guidance and Development of Transmigration Areas of Ministry of Manpower, and Directorate General of Village Community Empowerment of Ministry of Home Affairs and changed its name to Ministry of Villages, Development of Disadvantaged Regions, and Transmigration. However, village governance and village administration affairs remained in Ministry of Home Affairs, due to mandate of the ministry in administering government.

== Events ==
19 October 2015 - Minister Marwan Jafar launched the Developing Villages Index (IDM)

6 November 2018 - Minister Eko Putro Sandjojo announced that the 2019 village funds would be "prioritized for use in community empowerment activities, village economy, and village innovation".

== Organization Structure ==
Based on the President Decree No. 171/2024 and as expanded with Ministry of Villages and Development of Disadvantaged Regions Decree No. 1/2024 and 5/2025, the ministry consisted of:

1. Office of the Ministry of Villages and Development of Disadvantaged Regions
2. Office of the Deputy Ministry of Villages and Development of Disadvantaged Regions
3. General Secretariat
  1. Bureau of Planning, Collaborations, and Public Relations
  2. Bureau of Finance and State-owned Assets
  3. Bureau of Organization, Human Resources, and Bureaucracy Reform
  4. Bureau of Public Relations
  5. Bureau of Law
  6. Bureau of General Affairs and Procurement
4. Directorate General of Village Development and Villages (Directorate General I)
  1. Directorate General of Village Development and Villages Secretariat
  2. Directorate of Technical Planning of Village Development and Villages
  3. Directorate of Construction of Village Public Facilities and Infrastructures
  4. Directorate of Advocation and Partnership
  5. Directorate of Village Fund Facilitation
5. Directorate General of Economic Development and Community Empowerment in Villages and Disadvantaged Regions (Directorate General II)
  1. Directorate General of Economic Development and Community Empowerment Transmigration Secretariat
  2. Directorate of Technical Planning for Economic Development and Community Empowerment in Villages and Disadvantaged Regions
  3. Directorate of Economical Institutions Development and Investment in Villages and Disadvantaged Regions
  4. Directorate of Investment Facilitation in Villages and Disadvantaged Regions
  5. Directorate of Competitive Products Development in Villages and Disadvantaged Regions
  6. Directorate of Products Promotion and Marketing of Villages and Disadvantaged Regions Products
6. Directorate General of Acceleration of Development of Disadvantaged Regions (Directorate General III)
  1. Directorate General of Acceleration of Development of Disadvantaged Regions Secretariat
  2. Directorate of Planning Harmonization and Acceleration Development Program in Disadvantaged Regions
  3. Directorate of Harmonization for Social and Cultural Development and Institutional Affairs in Disadvantaged Regions
  4. Directorate of Harmonization for Construction of Public Facilities and Infrastructures in Disadvantaged Regions
  5. Directorate of Harmonization for Natural Resources and Environmental Utilization in Disadvantaged Regions
  6. Directorate of Harmonization for Special Region Development
7. Inspectorate General
  1. Inspectorate General Secretariat
  2. Inspectorate I
  3. Inspectorate II
  4. Inspectorate III
  5. Inspectorate IV
  6. Inspectorate V
8. Agency for Development and Information of Villages and Disadvantaged Regions
  1. Center for Villages and Disadvantaged Regions Policy Development and Development Plan Harmonization
  2. Center for Villages and Disadvantaged Regions Competitive Development
  3. Center for Villages and Disadvantaged Regions Policy Evaluation
  4. Center for Villages and Disadvantaged Regions Data and Information
9. Agency for Human Resources Development of Villages and Disadvantaged Regions
  1. Center for Community Development in Villages and Disadvantaged Regions
  2. Center for Human Resources Development in Villages and Disadvantaged Regions
  3. Center for Ministerial Employee Training
  4. Center for Functionaries Development
  5. Indonesian Center for Training and Community Development in Villages and Disadvantaged Regions, Jakarta
  6. Indonesian Institute for Training and Community Development in Villages and Disadvantaged Regions, Bengkulu
  7. Indonesian Institute for Training and Community Development in Villages and Disadvantaged Regions, Makassar
  8. Indonesian Institute for Training and Community Development in Villages and Disadvantaged Regions, Ambon
  9. Indonesian Institute for Training and Community Development in Villages and Disadvantaged Regions, Jayapura
10. Board of Experts
  1. Expert Staff for Development and Society
  2. Expert Staff for Institutional Relations
  3. Expert Staff for Legal Affairs and Bureaucracy Reform
