= Freddy Jaques Inkiriwang =

Indonesian politician

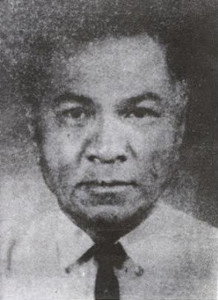

Minister of Industry
- In office 9 April 1957 – 6 July 1959
- President: Sukarno
- Prime Minister: Djuanda Kartawidjaja

Personal details
- Born: September 2, 1912 Surabaya, Dutch East Indies
- Died: October 19, 1972 (aged 60) Jakarta, Indonesia

Freddy Jaques Inkiriwang (2 September 1912 – 19 October 1972) was a former Indonesian Minister of Industry in the Djuanda Cabinet. He received an Ingenieur degree (abbreviated as "Ir.", a Dutch type engineer's degree) in electrical engineering from at the Delft University of Technology in 1937. After the Proclamation of Indonesian Independence, Inkiriwang was involved in the formation of the state electricity company and the independence struggle in Sulawesi (his family was from the Minahasa region in North Sulawesi). After the establishment of the Bureau of Electricity and Gas on 27 October 1945, Inkiriwang was assigned to head the West Java region. He was also appointed as head of development in the Sulawesi Commissariat organization in Jakarta to assist the struggle in Sulawesi.

In 1950, Inkiriwang was included in the last cabinet of the State of East Indonesia (NIT) led by Prime Minister Martinus Putuhena. This Cabinet was dubbed the Liquidation Cabinet as it aimed to restore the unitary Republic of Indonesia where NIT was included. From 1957 to 1959, Inkiriwang served as Minister of Industry in the cabinet led by Prime Minister Djuanda. In his role as minister of industry, he was also an acting member of the Monetary Board of Bank Indonesia.

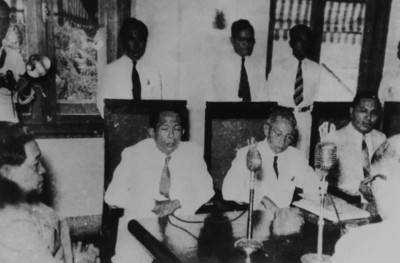
Inkiriwang (seated on right) during the takeover of the Dutch East Indies electricity company
