= Regiment Infanterie Johan Willem Friso =

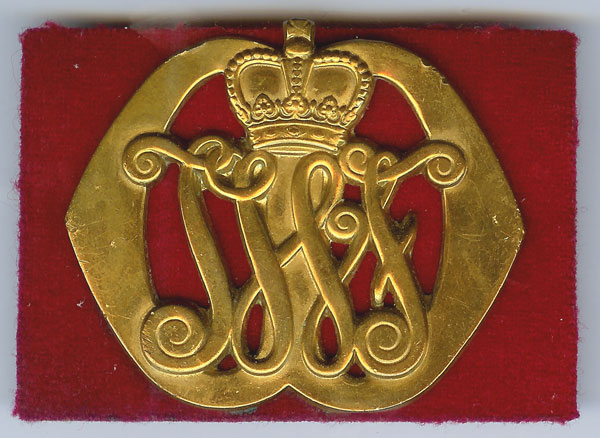
- Beret emblem
- Active: 1950 – Present
- Country: Netherlands
- Branch: Royal Netherlands Army
- Type: Armoured infantry
- Size: One battalion One HQ staff company
- Patron: John William Friso

The Regiment Infantry Prins Johan Willem Friso is a line infantry regiment of the Royal Netherlands Army. Named after Johan Willem Friso of Orange-Nassau, it is the oldest and most senior regiment in the current order of battle. The regiment currently serves in the mechanized infantry role as 44 Armoured Infantry Battalion (44 Painfbat) as part of 43 Gemechaniseerde (Mechanized) Brigade.

== Naming ==
The regiment was formed during the 1950s, in a major reorganisation of the Royal Netherlands Army (Koninklijke Landmacht) after the end of World War II.

Before 1950 the army consisted of numbered regiment; in 1950 these regiments were changed into named regiments.

The Regiment Infantry Johan Willem Friso was created on 1 juli 1950 as a continuation of the former 1st Regiment Infantry (1 RI) and 9th Regiment Infantry (9 RI). Both 1 RI and 9 RI had always been stationed in the North of the Netherlands: 1 RI in Assen (province of Drenthe) and 9 RI in Leeuwarden (province of Friesland). Therefore, it was decided to name the new regiment after the former Stadhouder of Friesland, Groningen and Drenthe: Johan Willem Friso, Prince of Orange (born 14 August 1687 – died 14 July 1711).

In November 2020, the title of "Prince" was added to the name of the regiment, thereby becoming the Regiment Infanterie Prins Johan Willem Friso.

== Battle honours displayed on the colours ==
- Tiendaagse Veldtocht 1831
- Citadel van Antwerpen 1832
- Java en Sumatra 1946-1949
- Noord-Kandahar en Uruzgan 2006

Each member of the 44th armoured infantry battalion (which is part of the regiment) carries a blue lanyard on their uniform in commemoration of their involvement in the UNIFIL peacekeeping operation in Lebanon from 1979 to 1985.

== See also ==
- Friesland Battalion

== Bibliography ==
- Het Regiment Infanterie Johan Willem Friso H.J. Zwitser en J.P.C.M. van Hoof. uitg Sectie Militaire Geschiedenis Koninklijke Landmacht, 1999. ISBN 90-70677-49-0
