= Royal Netherlands East Indies Army Women's Corps =

- Vrouwenkorps van het Koninklijk Nederlands(ch)-Indisch Leger (Dutch)
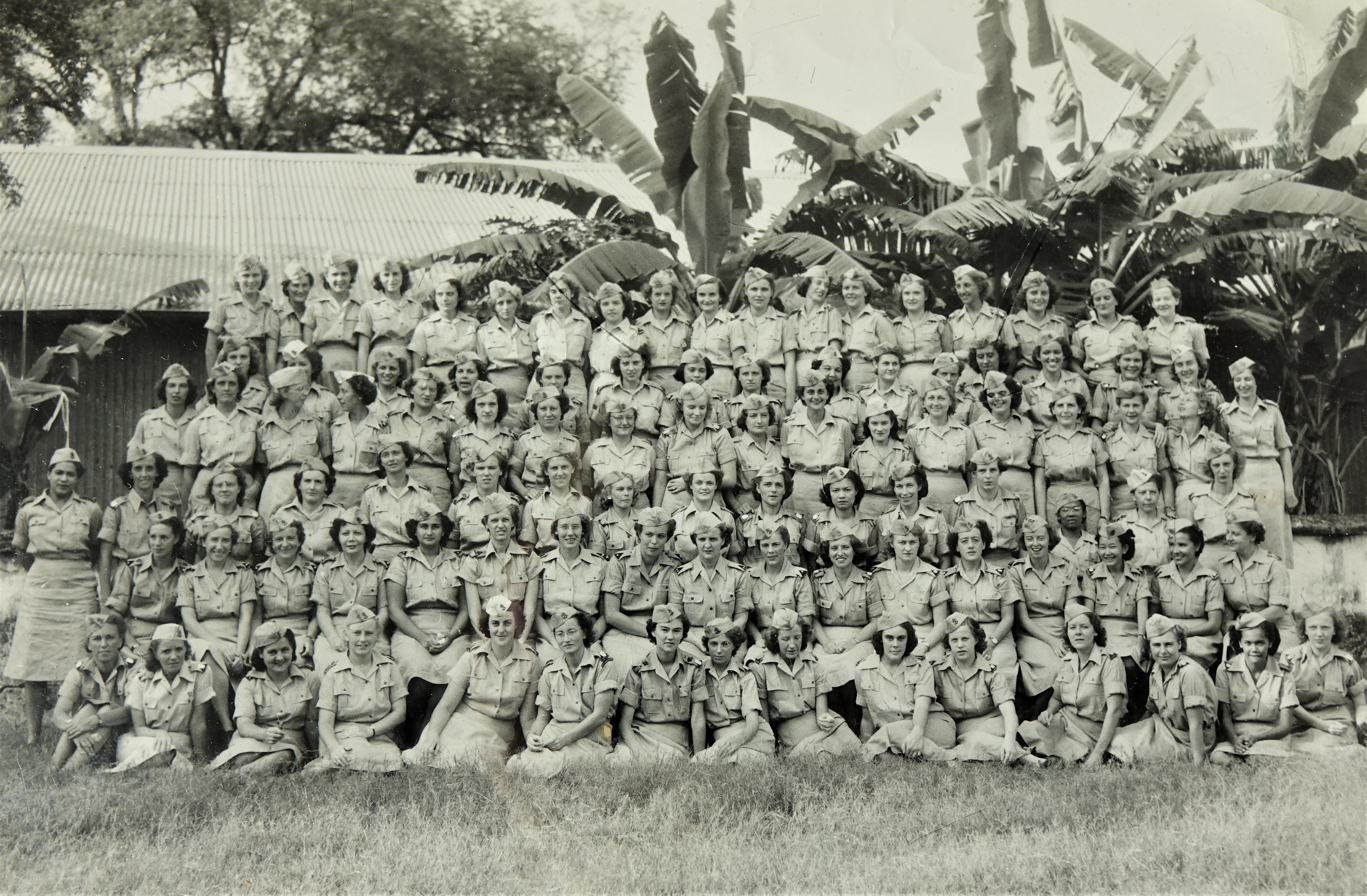
- VK-KNIL recruits in Bandung, 1949
- Founded: 5 March 1944; 81 years ago
- Disbanded: 26 July 1950; 74 years ago
- Country: Dutch East Indies
- Branch: Royal Netherlands East Indies Army
- Engagements: List of engagements: World War II; Indonesian War of Independence

The Royal Netherlands East Indies Army Women's Corps (Dutch: Vrouwenkorps van het Koninklijk Nederlands(ch)-Indisch Leger, VK-KNIL) was the women's branch of the Royal Netherlands East Indies Army (KNIL) that consisted of female oorlogsvrijwilligers. It was founded during World War II on 5 March 1944 in Melbourne and disbanded at the conclusion of the Indonesian War of Independence with the abolition of the KNIL on 26 July 1950.

== Background ==
In August 1943, the Netherlands East Indies Commission for Australia and New Zealand (Dutch: Nederlands(ch)-Indische Commissie voor Australië en Nieuw-Zeeland, NINDICOM) in Melbourne wrote to the minister of the Colonies with the request to send information about the women's auxiliary corps that the Dutch government-in-exile intended to set up in England. In October 1943, mr. N.S. Blom, member of the Council of Assistance for Netherlands East Indies Affairs (Dutch: Raad van Bijstand voor Nederlands(ch)-Indische Zaken) in London, forwarded all documents concerning the organization of the women's auxiliary corps to the commission in Australia.

On 20 December 1943, the Dutch minister of War, jhr. O.C.A van Lidth de Jeude, issued the so-called 'Auxiliary Corps Decision' in England, establishing the first Dutch women's corps to be given military status. This made it possible to deploy women in a military context. The corps was given the name Volunteer Women's Auxiliary Corps (Dutch: Vrijwillig Vrouwen Hulpkorps, VVHK) and was part of the Royal Netherlands Army. The first certificate of enlistment was signed on 25 April 1944, which is why this date officially counts as the date of entry of women into the Royal Netherlands Army. The first commander of the VVHK was Major C.E. Smit-Dyserinck.

== History ==
On 5 March 1944 the Women's Corps of the Royal Netherlands East Indies Army was established by the Netherlands East Indies government-in-exile in Melbourne, as the counterpart of the new women's corps of the Dutch army in Europe. This was the first colonial women's corps within the Kingdom of the Netherlands. Initially, the corps consisted of women from wealthy families with ties to the Dutch East Indies, from areas of the Netherlands that had already been liberated in 1944, and from various countries outside occupied Europe, such as the Dutch West Indies, Canada, the United States, England, Argentina, Cuba, and Australia. The first VK-KNIL officers were kommandante first lieutenant J.M. Meerburg, second lieutenant C.A. Smit and second lieutenant J.C. Person.

Quoting Mrs Blom-Gelderman, recruiting officer in New York City: "The VK-KNIL was founded with a focus on "island hopping". It was thought that the Indies should be conquered island by island and that the troops should go to such an island. And where are the troops, there you need secretaries, medical analysts, pharmacists and doctors. And they were often recruited from the VK-KNIL at the time, that was its purpose."

After World War II, volunteers in the Netherlands were asked through newspaper advertisements by the Department of War (now the Ministry of Defence) to apply to join the VK-KNIL. They were often well-educated and were deployed for additional tasks as a pharmacist (assistant), secretary, nurse or for work in the soup kitchens and canteens. From 1946 they could also be employed in administrative work, such as in the intelligence service and the liaison service.

Until the abolition of the KNIL a total of around 1,000 women served with the corps, with a contract duration of 6 months to 3 years. The women of the Vrouwenkorps received military training spanning from several weeks to several months, although the women's corps was non-combatant. In the first years after formation, recruits did receive weapons training, but in practice VK-KNIL members served unarmed.

=== 1944–1946 ===
From April 1944, women of the Vrouwenkorps were deployed to Hollandia, Western New Guinea. The mainly medical personnel were deployed to bring aid to the population. In September 1945, the first VK-KNIL members left Australia by plane for Java and Sumatra to work as welfare officers for the "Displaced Persons" (KDP) and the "Recovery Allied Prisoners of War and Internees" (RAPWI) offices. The goal was to register and reunite as many people as possible with their families.

In October 1945, a group of 180 Vrouwenkorps members left the Netherlands for Java. The military commander in Java, British Lieutenant General Philip Christison, had forbidden Dutch military units to land on Java, however, because of the turbulent political situation in Java. The women of the VK-KNIL were forced to disembark at Malacca, one of the British Straits Settlements. This "Penang group" was put to work in hospitals in Penang and Kuala Lumpur, British Malaya, until February 1946. After this "Penang group", no more Vrouwenkorps members were sent from the Netherlands to the East until June/July 1947. There was local recruitment, however, as the corps was expanded with a few dozen Indian parachute folding women.

The women of the VK-KNIL were trained to assist in the liberation of the Dutch East Indies, they were ill-equipped for the nascent Indonesian National Revolution. During the Bersiap period, a number of Vrouwenkorps members found themselves briefly imprisoned by Indonesian nationalists before they were liberated by British troops. No women of the VK-KNIL were killed in combat.

Originally it was intended that the Vrouwenkorps would remain in service for a maximum of six months after the liberation of the Indies. The VK-KNIL was to be disbanded on 6 April 1946, but in February of that year it was decided to keep the corps active due to a large personnel shortage.

=== 1947–1950 ===
In the second period of the Vrouwenkorps the recruits mainly came from the Netherlands itself. Where the emphasis in the first period was on medical personnel, from 1947 the women of the VK-KNIL were mainly deployed to administrative posts. The corps now also had a captain: Mrs. C.A. Smith.

Vrouwenkorps members were mainly stationed in the larger cities. The barracks on Laan Holle in Batavia (present-day Jakarta), the former Ursuline convent, functioned as the headquarters of the VK-KNIL. Military training of overseas recruits took place in the more elevated city of Bandung. The women of the Vrouwenkorps were relatively safe, they generally stayed far away from the front line. Many of them had busy social lives. A survey of 68 VK-KNIL veterans at a reunion in 1994 found that at least half of the women had entered into long-term relationships during their time in service, which had resulted in marriages.

In December 1949 the transfer of sovereignty over the Dutch East Indies to Indonesia was signed. From that moment on, repatriation of KNIL personnel and their families was a priority. Most Vrouwenkorps women were repatriated to the Netherlands in 1950. On arrival they were immediately dismissed from the KNIL, which was disbanded on 26 July 1950.

== See also ==
- Oorlogsvrijwilligers
- Royal Netherlands Army Women's Auxiliary Corps
