= Royal Netherlands Army Women's Auxiliary Corps =

Royal Netherlands Army (Volunteer) Women's Auxiliary Corps
- (Vrijwillig) Vrouwen Hulpkorps (Dutch)
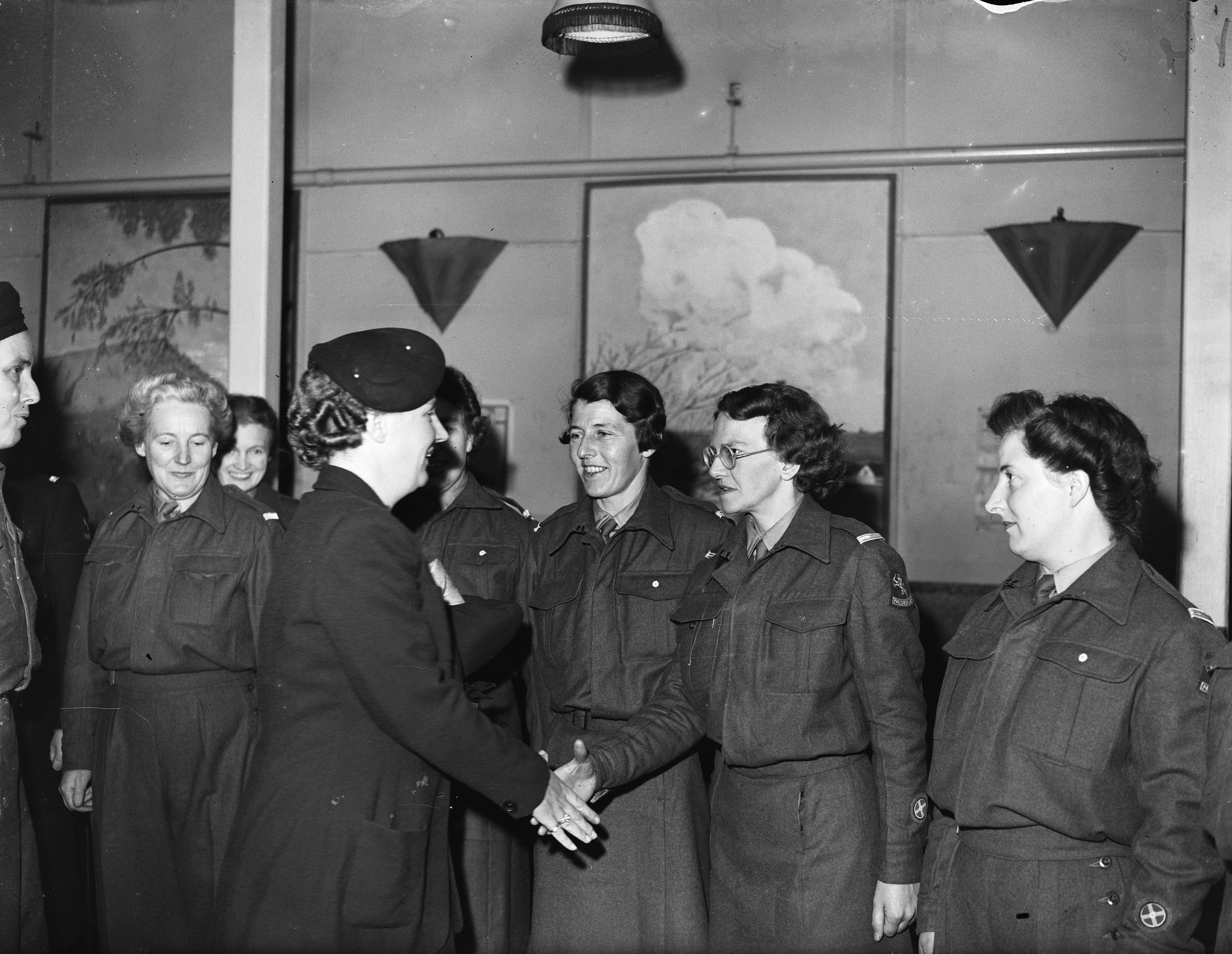
- Visit of Princess Juliana to the Women's Auxiliary Corps in Wolverhampton, 1944
- Founded: 20 December 1943; 81 years ago
- Disbanded: 1 July 1952; 72 years ago
- Country: Netherlands
- Branch: Royal Netherlands Army
- Engagements: World War II

The Royal Netherlands Army (Volunteer) Women's Auxiliary Corps (Dutch: (Vrijwillig) Vrouwen Hulpkorps, (V)VHK) was the women's branch of the Royal Army of the Netherlands Armed Forces from 1943 to 1952. The VHK was the predecessor of the Royal Netherlands Army Women's Department (Dutch: Militaire Vrouwen Afdeling, Milva), which existed from 1951 to 1982.

In total, more than 1,000 women served in the VHK. Their length of service varied between six months and three years.

== History ==
The VHK was founded on 20 December 1943 by the London Committee of the Netherlands Red Cross at the suggestion of the Ministry of War. To find women for the corps, an advertisement was placed in Vrij Nederland newspaper in the summer of 1943. About 270 women of different nationalities responded. The new unit would fall under the authority of the Royal Netherlands Army, although the corps was not given military status in the beginning. The purpose of the unit was to provide unarmed humanitarian aid. In the early days, the corps members wore the British Red Cross uniform, which consisted of a dark blue skirt, a dark blue jacket, a white shirt and a black tie. They wore black stockings and shoes. On their beret was a Red Cross emblem. After the name Women's Auxiliary Corps was finalized in 1944, the women wore a khaki uniform, as worn by the British female soldiers of the Auxiliary Territorial Service (ATS).

After the Normandy landings, the Women's Auxiliary Corps was militarized so that they could follow the troops into Belgium, North Brabant, and Zeeland. Six Engelandvaarders joined: Ellis Brandon, Els van Dien-Hendrix, Martha van Esso-Polak, Elly Nauta-Moret, Marie Knapper, and Emmy Rutten-Broekman, who was part of the staff. On 13 November 1944, five women crossed over to Ostend to help evacuated children. Marie Knapper was sent to the United States to recruit overseas Dutch for the VHK.

In 1944, the Royal Navy founded its own auxiliary corps, the Royal Netherlands Navy Women's Department (Dutch: Marine Vrouwenafdeling, Marva), and the Royal Netherlands East Indies Army created the Royal Netherlands East Indies Army Women's Corps (Dutch: Vrouwenkorps van het Koninklijk Nederlands(ch)-Indisch Leger, VK-KNIL). Both were mainly active in the Dutch East Indies during the Indonesian War of Independence. In 1951, the Royal Air Force followed suit with the establishment of the Royal Netherlands Air Force Women's Department (Dutch: Luchtmacht Vrouwenafdeling, Luva).

== See also ==
- Oorlogsvrijwilligers
- Royal Netherlands East Indies Army Women's Corps
