= Ellis Brandon =

Dutch veteran (1923–2024)

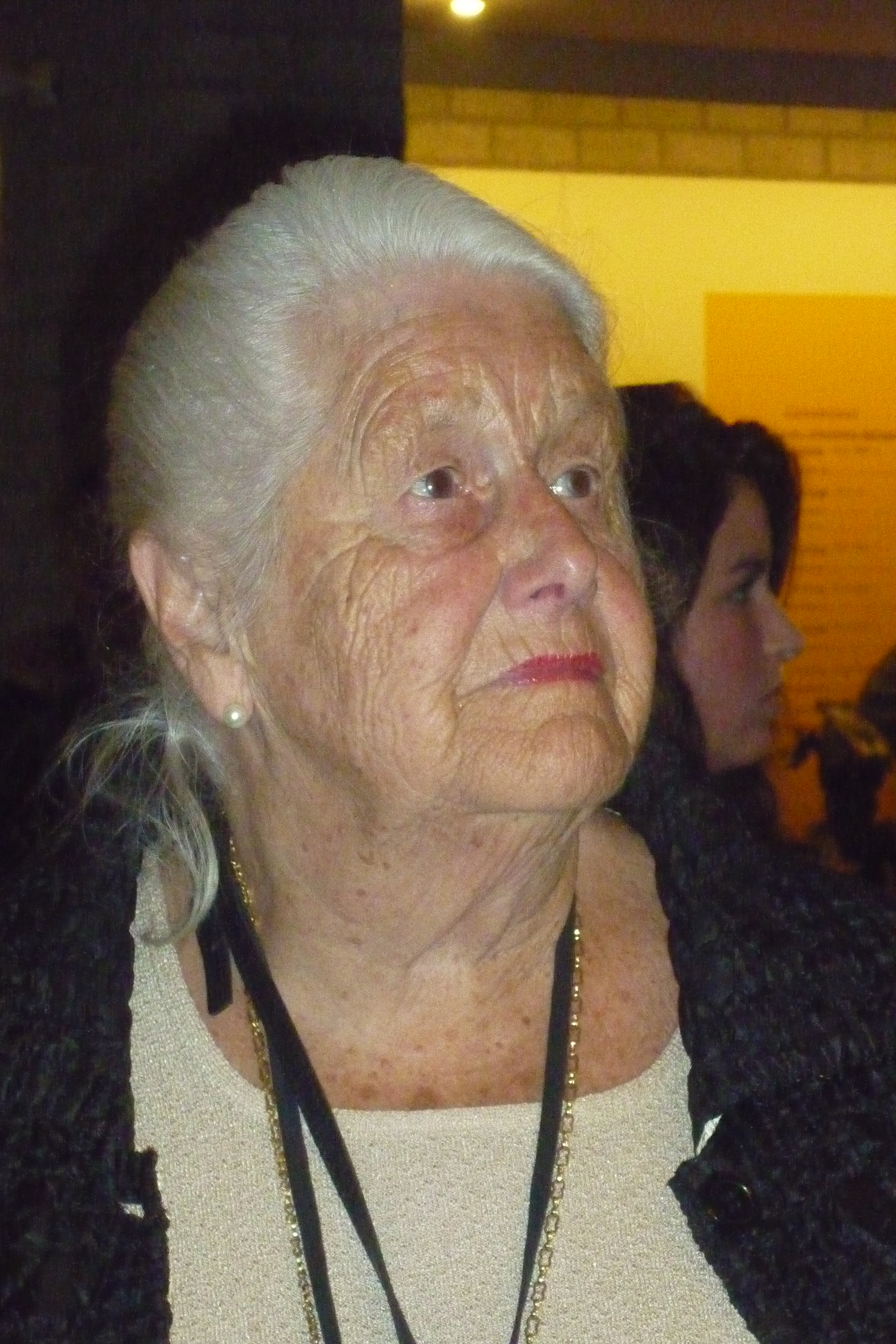
- Ellis Brandon in 2011
- Born: 8 April 1923; Amsterdam, Netherlands
- Died: 12 July 2024 (aged 101); Schilde, Belgium
- Occupation: Veteran

Ellis Maud Brandon (8 April 1923 – 12 July 2024) was a Dutch veteran of the Second World War. She was one of the few female Engelandvaarders.

== Early life ==
Brandon was born in Amsterdam, to father, Frederick Charles Brandon and mother, Adèle Cornelia Manikus. After secondary school she studied advertising drawing at the School of Arts and Crafts in Amsterdam.

== World War II ==
When World War II broke out, Brandon lived with her father and stepmother in Heemstede. At the request of her friend Herman Friedhoff (1920–2000), she became a courier for Het Parool and Vrij Nederland. Friedhoff was a member of the resistance group "Apostles".

On 7 August 1942, the Gestapo raided her parents' house in search of Friedhoff, who had close contacts with Herman Bernard Wiardi Beckman and Herman van Roijen. They fled through the back door and went into hiding. A restless existence followed, moving from one hiding place to another. Brandon was a maid in a nursing home on Mathenesserlaan in Rotterdam, and Friedhoff was given an attic room there where she could stay for some time.

Friedhoff was wanted by the Sicherheitsdienst (SD), which offered a reward of 1000 guilders for a tip that would lead to her arrest. When her mother was taken hostage and Friedhoff was sentenced to death, the attic room was no longer safe. They decided to leave the Netherlands and so they fled on 28 April 1943, the journey went via Belgium, France, Spain to Portugal. It then took some time before she was granted a visa. On 8 January 1944, she flew to England. There she worked at the Dutch Ministry of the Interior as a population registry employee. Later she was allowed to keep an eye on fighter planes on the roof of the ministry to raise the alarm for impending bombardments. Her request to return to the Netherlands as a spy for England was denied. Brandon also signed up for the Dutch army unit Women's Aid Corps (VHK). In December 1944 she married Chris Krediet.

== After the war ==
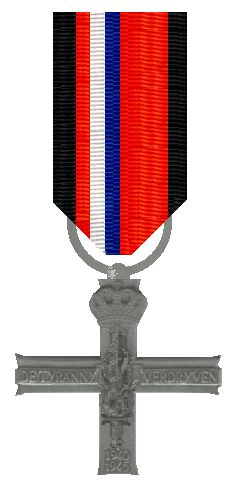
Resistance memorial cross

She and Krediet parted as good friends after a few years. In 1952, she remarried Albert Vis (1920-1971), with whom she had two sons. Her granddaughter Carlijn Vis (1983) wrote Vrij Spel (ISBN 9789025437855), inspired by the stories of her grandmother. After Vis' death, Brandon remarried at the age of 53 in 1976 to widower Colonel Jan Anne Baron de Smeth (1924–2017).

After the death of pilot André Hissink, Brandon was the last known living Dutch England sailor at the time.

== Personal life ==
After arriving in England, Ellis was offered the Cross of Merit, but she declined. On 29 December 1980, she was awarded the Resistance Memorial Cross .

Brandon died on 12 July 2024 at the age of 101. Her funeral took place on 20 July 2024.
