= Korps Insulinde =

- Active: 1 August 1942-March 1946
- Disbanded: November 1945-March 1946
- Country: Netherlands
- Allegiance: Dutch government-in-exile
- Branch: Royal Netherlands Army
- Type: Special Forces
- Engagements: World War II

Korps Insulinde ('Insulindia Corps') was a Dutch Commando (special operations capable) established on 1 August 1942 in British Ceylon, present-day Sri Lanka. The unit, originally called the Netherland Special Operations, emerged from the Princess Irene Brigade alongside No. 2 (Dutch) Troop of the No. 10 (Inter-Allied) Commando. The Korps Insulinde fought during World War II against the Japanese occupiers of the Dutch East Indies. The corps was commanded by Major Frits Mollinger of the Royal Netherlands East Indies Army (KNIL) and was stationed in Ceylon. It carried out a number of long-range penetration for infiltration and intelligence gathering operations in occupied Sumatra. The corps was disbanded between November 1945 and early March 1946.

== History ==
The 1st battalion of the Princess Irene Brigade, numbering 19 officers, 37 non-commissioned officers, 28 corporals and 70 soldiers, left for Ceylon. They departed by train from Wolverhampton, England to Gourock, Scotland on 6 January 1942 and left the next day aboard the merchant ship HNLMS Colombia of the Koninklijke Nederlandse Stoomboot-Maatschappij (KNSM) from Glasgow. The ship also carried torpedoes and was protected by a convoy. It arrived in Colombo, British Ceylon on 7 March 1942, the day the Dutch East Indies fell to the Japanese. Lieutenant admiral Conrad Helfrich, Commander of the Armed Forces in the East (BSO), suggested that the brigade be returned to England, but this did not happen. Only Lieutenant general David van Voorst Evekink, brigade commander since 1941, returned to Europe on 10 June 1942. The Colombia stayed in Colombo.

At the initiative of a number of soldiers of the Princess Irene Brigade, the battalion was transformed into a new unit, originally called "Netherland Special Operations", for clandestine operations in occupied Sumatra. The Korps Insulinde remained stationed in Ceylon and in turn became part of the British Force 136 for special actions in the Far East.

In the summer of 1942 the corps began their commando training, followed by commando style raids training, gathering military intelligence training, irregular warfare training, jungle and mountain warfare training, parachute training, SERE training, and tactical first aid training. In 1943 and 1944, 17 (according to some sources 11) landings on the coast of Sumatra were carried out, often from a submarine. Not all of them were successful. Notably, Lieutenant H.E. Wijnmalen was taken prisoner and killed by the Kenpeitai after interrogation and torture.

From May 1945, the Korps Insulinde was reinforced with 154 volunteers, including members of No. 2 Dutch Troop and the Bureau Bijzondere Opdrachten (BBO; 'Special Assignments Office'). In July 1945, a number of teams were deployed by parachute over Sumatra.

After the Japanese surrender on August 15, the corps was charged with securing the approximately 15,000 Japanese prisoners of war in Sumatra. The dissolution of the Korps Insulinde began in November 1945 and was completed in early March 1946.

== Notable members ==
- Lieutenant R. van Aarem, recipient of the Bronze Cross
- Captain Jhr. D. van den Brandeler, recipient of the Bronze Cross
- Lieutenant C.A.M. Brondgeest, recipient of the Bronze Cross
- Colonel Jhr. mr. M.W.C. de Jonge, recipient of the Bronze Lion
- Captain B.W. Lefrandt, recipient of the Bronze Lion
- Lieutenant C.J. Overweel, recipient of the Bronze Lion
- Lieutenant J.F. de Roo, recipient of the Cross of Merit
- Captain W.J. Scheepens, recipient of the Bronze Lion
- Captain C. Sisselaar, recipient of the Bronze Cross
- Captain R.P.P. Westerling, future commander of the Korps Speciale Troepen
- Lieutenant H.E. Wijnmalen, recipient of the Bronze Lion (posthumous)

== See also ==
- Korps Speciale Troepen
- Netherlands East Indies Forces Intelligence Service
