= Lie Kiat Teng =

Indonesian doctor and politician (1912–1983)

Mohammad Ali
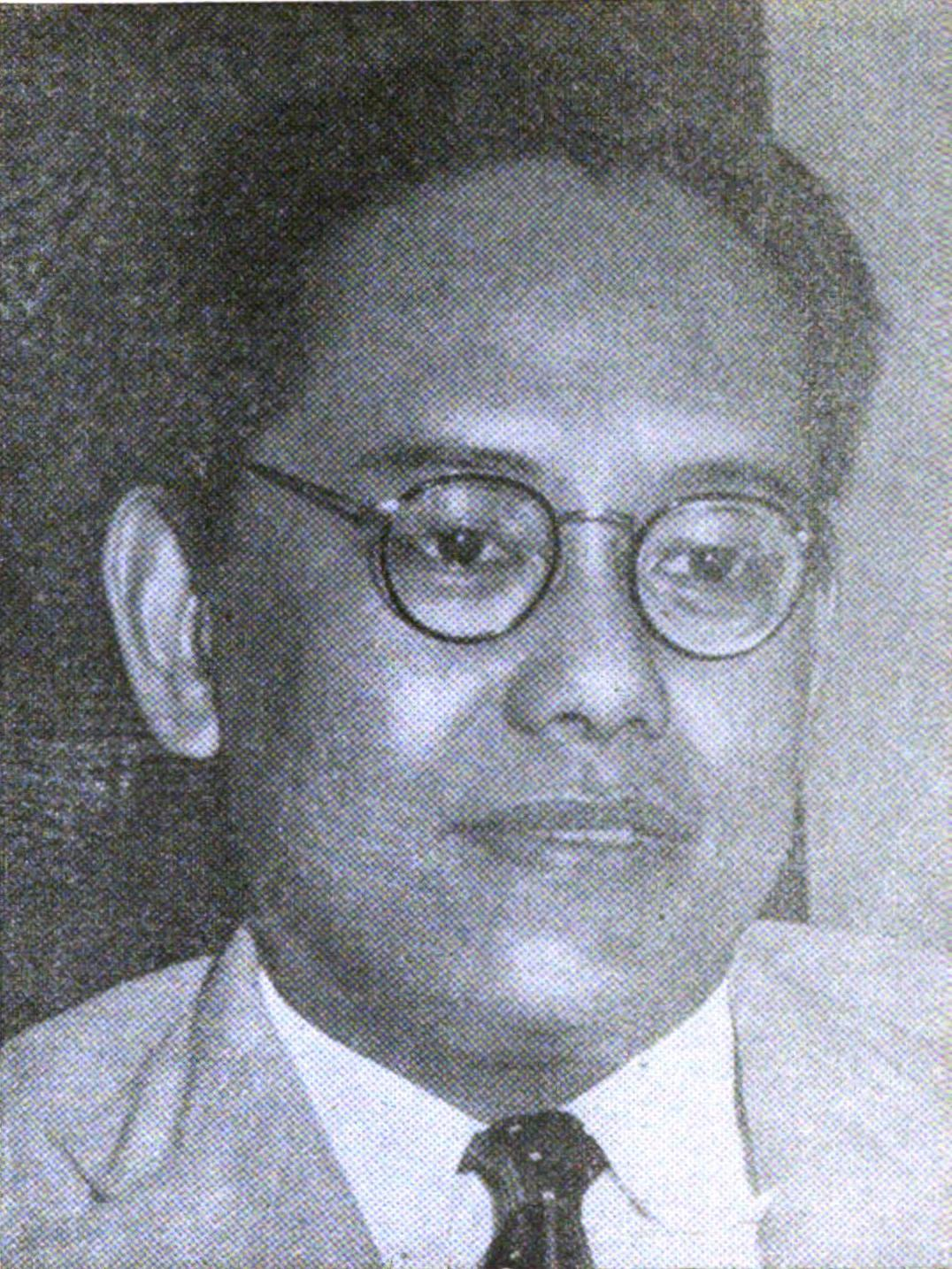
- Lie in 1954

7th Minister of Health of Indonesia
- In office 9 October 1953 – 12 August 1955
- President: Sukarno
- Preceded by: Ferdinand Lumban Tobing
- Succeeded by: Johannes Leimena

Personal details
- Born: Lie Kiat Teng (李傑登); 17 August 1912 Sukabumi, Dutch East Indies
- Died: 21 July 1983 (aged 70) Jakarta, Indonesia
- Party: Indonesian Islamic Union Party

Chinese name
- Chinese: 李杰登
Transcriptions
Standard Mandarin
- Hanyu Pinyin: Lǐ Jiédēng
Southern Min
- Hokkien POJ: Lí Kia̍t-teng

Mohammad Ali (born Lie Kiat Teng, 17 August 1912 – 21 July 1983) was an Indonesian doctor and politician. He served as the Minister of Health between 1953 and 1955.

== Early life and practice ==
Lie Kiat Teng was born in Sukabumi, West Java, on 17 August 1912. He completed his primary schooling in Bandung. In 1930, he enrolled at the Nederlandsch-Indische Artsen School in Surabaya; he graduated in 1938.

Lie spent time as a government doctor in Curup and Bengkulu. He also practiced at the Rejang Lebong Gold Mine, as well as the Waringin Tiga Plantation Central Hospital. After the Empire of Japan occupied the Dutch East Indies in 1942, Lie was made responsible for the government's health division in the Bengkulu Region.

Following Indonesia's proclamation of independence in 1945, he was appointed county doctor in Palembang. When the Dutch recaptured Palembang as part of their efforts to retake the Indonesian archipelago, Lie was compelled to step down and enter private practice. During this period, he operated out of his home in Talang Djawa, Palembang; he also owned and operated the Sin An Pharmacy. Lie converted to Islam in 1946 and took the name Mohammad Ali. By the 1950s, he had joined the Indonesian Islamic Union Party (PSII) and been entrusted with its economic section.

== Minister of Health and later life ==
Lie served as the Minister of Health of Indonesia between 1953 and 1955, serving on the First Ali Sastroamidjojo Cabinet. In this capacity, he created the Council for Consideration of Health and Islamic Law (Madjelis Pertimbangan Kesehatan dan Sjara'), seeking to balance healthcare and Islamic law. When controversy emerged over the dearth of healthcare in South Sulawesi, Lie stated that doctors had a "moral obligation" to provide healthcare in the region; he also indicated that, should compliance be lacking, legal measures could be used.

During his time as Minister of Health, Lie secured funding for the Palembang Central Hospital (now the Dr. Mohammad Hoesin Central Hospital) in Palembang; the hospital opened in 1957. He also helped establish the Faculty of Medicine at Sriwijaya University, Palembang. He spoke out against a 1954 draft of Indonesia's citizenship law, holding that, while the question of dual citizenship for Chinese Indonesians would have to be settled, a shift from a passive to an active approach could disenfranchise voters and complicate upcoming elections. Lie was one of seven cabinet members of Chinese heritage to serve under President Sukarno; another, Ong Eng Die, was Minister of Finance in the same cabinet.

On 28 March 1957, Lie was one of twelve civil servants summoned to the Military Police Corps in a corruption investigation; others included former Deputy Prime Minister Sjafruddin Prawiranegara and the film producer-turned-politician Djamaluddin Malik. Lie was ultimately cleared.

Lie died on 21 July 1983 at his home in Jakarta, leaving a wife and eleven children. His body was flown to Palembang for burial, and he was interred on 12 August of that year. Approximately 2,160 textbooks from Lie's collection were donated to the library of Sriwijaya University.

== Works cited ==
- Best, Antony, ed. (2008). British Documents on Foreign Affairs: Reports and Papers from the Foreign Office Confidential Print. From 1951 through 1956. Asia, 1951-1956. Part V. Vol. 7. LexisNexis. ISBN 978-0-88692-723-3.
- "Dr Lie Kiat Teng Meninggal Dunia" [Dr Lie Kiat Teng Dies]. Kompas (in Indonesian). 21 July 1983. p. 12.
- Fakih, Farabi (2020). Authoritarian Modernization in Indonesia's Early Independence Period: The Foundation of the New Order State (1950–1965). Verhandelingen van het Koninklijk Instituut voor Taal-, Land- en Volkenkunde. Vol. 312. Leiden: Brill. ISBN 9789004437722.
- Kami Perkenalkan [Let Us Introduce] (PDF) (in Indonesian). Jakarta: Ministry of Information of Indonesia. 1954.
- Murakami, Saki (2014). "Call for Doctors!: Uneven Medical Provision and the Modernization of State Health Care during the Decolonization of Indonesia, 1930s–1950s". In Freek Colombijn; Joost Coté (eds.). Cars, Conduits, and Kampongs: The Modernization of the Indonesian City, 1920–1960. Verhandelingen van het Koninklijk Instituut voor Taal-, Land- en Volkenkunde. Vol. 295. Leiden: Brill. pp. 27–61. ISBN 9789004280724.
- "P.S.I.I. Konsekwen" [P.S.I.I. Steady] (PDF). Suara Merdeka (in Indonesian). 24 November 1954. p. 1.
- "Perkenalkan Menteri2 Baru" [Introducing the New Ministers] (PDF). Kedaulatan Rakjat (in Indonesian). 12 October 1953. p. 2.
- "Sejarah RSMH Palembang" [History of RSMH Palembang] (in Indonesian). Dr. Mohammad Hoesin Central Hospital. Archived from the original on 3 October 2023.
- Setyautama, Sam; Mihardja, Suma, eds. (2008). "Lie Kiat Teng". Tokoh-tokoh etnis Tionghoa di Indonesia [Ethnic Chinese Figures in Indonesia] (in Indonesian). Jakarta: Kepustakaan Populer Gramedia in collaboration with the Chen Xingchu Foundation. ISBN 9789799101259.
- "Sumbangan Buku untuk Unsri" [Book Donations for Unsri]. Kompas (in Indonesian). 19 August 1983. p. 6.
- Suryadinata, Leo, ed. (2015). "Ali, Mohammad". Prominent Indonesian Chinese: Biographical Sketches (4th ed.). Singapore: Institute of Southeast Asian Studies. p. 4. ISBN 9789814345217.
- Tan, Mely G. (2004). "Unity in Diversity: Ethnic Chinese and Nation-Building in Indonesia". In Suryadinata, Leo (ed.). Ethnic Relations and Nation-Building in Southeast Asia: The Case of the Ethnic Chinese. Singapore: Institute of Southeast Asian Studies. pp. 20–44. ISBN 9789812301826.
- Wibisono, Christianto (24 January 2012). "Anatomi Politik Tionghoa" [Political Anatomy of the Chinese]. Kompas. p. 7.
- Wilmott, Donald Earl (2009). The National Status of the Chinese in Indonesia, 1900–1958. Sheffield: Equinox Publishing. ISBN 9786028397285.
