= Ferdinand Lumban Tobing =

Indonesian politician

Major General (Titular) Ferdinand Lumban Tobing
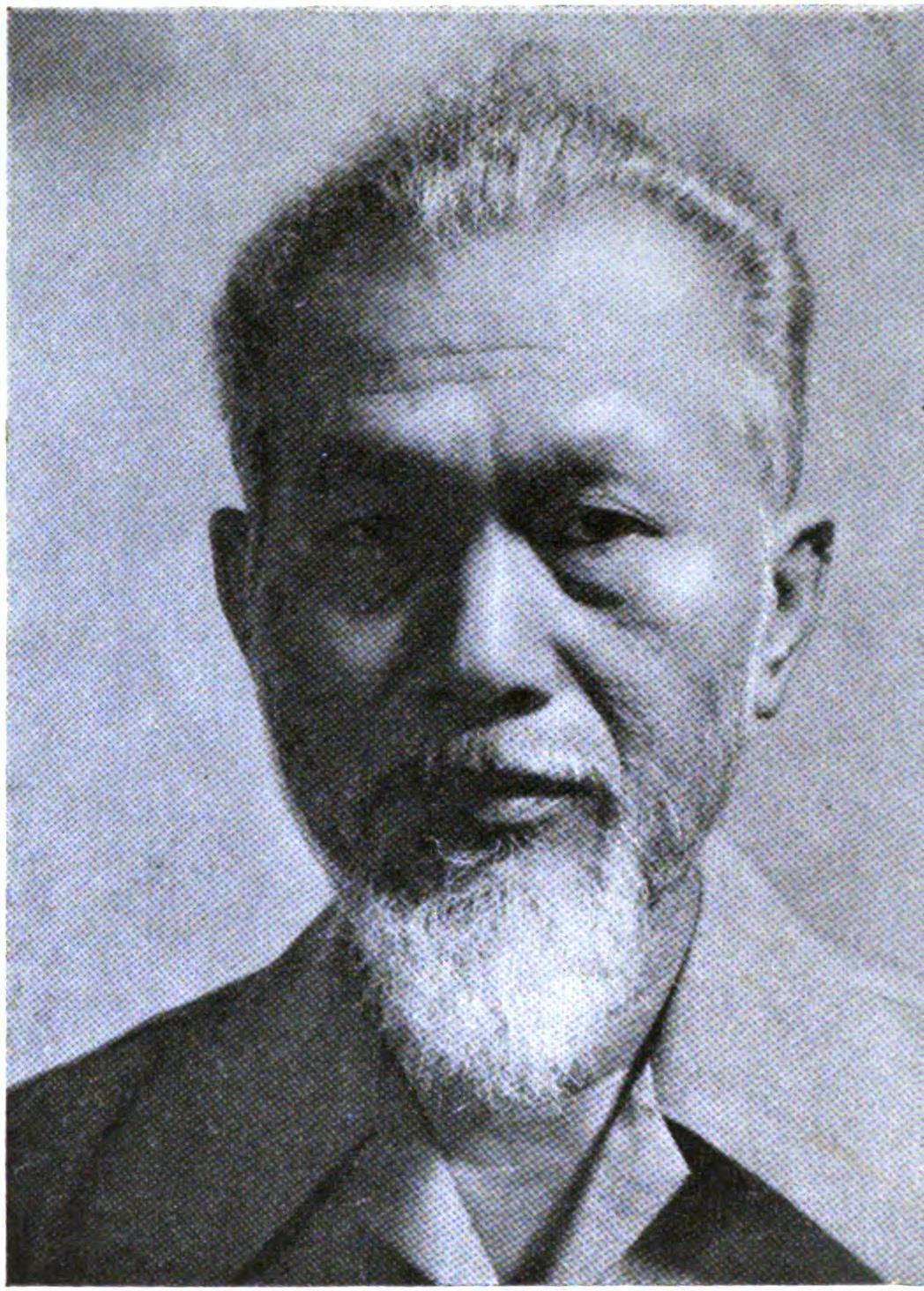
- Official portrait, 1954

1st State Minister for Transmigration Affairs of Indonesia
- In office 25 June 1958 – 5 July 1959
- President: Sukarno
- Prime Minister: Djuanda Kartawidjaja
- Preceded by: Position established
- Succeeded by: Achmadi Hadisoemarto

10th Minister of Information of Indonesia
- In office 30 July 1953 – 12 August 1955
- President: Sukarno
- Preceded by: Arnold Mononutu
- Succeeded by: Sjamsuddin Sutan Makmur

a.i. Minister of Health of Indonesia
- In office 30 July 1953 – 9 October 1953
- President: Sukarno
- Preceded by: Johannes Leimena
- Succeeded by: Lie Kiat Teng

Governor of North Sumatra
- In office 1948–1950
- Preceded by: Sutan Muhammad Amin Nasution
- Succeeded by: Sarimin Reksodiharjo

Personal details
- Born: 19 February 1899 Sibuluan, Sibolga, Tapanuli, North Sumatra, Dutch East Indies
- Died: 7 October 1962 (aged 63) Djakarta, Indonesia
- Spouse: Anna Paulina Elfringhoff Kincap
- Relations: Jonathan Ompu Tording Sitohang (son in law); Johnny Sitohang (grandson)
- Children: 7
- Parent(s): Herman Lumban Tobing (father); Laura Sitanggang (mother)
- Education: STOVIA Batavia
- Profession: doctor

Military service
- Allegiance: Indonesia
- Branch/service: Indonesian Army
- Years of service: 1945–1962
- Rank: Major General (Titular)
- Battles/wars: Indonesian War of Independence

Ferdinand Lumban Tobing (19 February 1899 – 7 October 1962) was Minister of Manpower and Transmigration of the Republic of Indonesia, Minister for Communications and Information, Minister of Health, and Governor of North Sumatra, who is regarded as a National Hero of Indonesia.
