= Siege of Surakarta =

1949 Indonesian National Revolution campaign

4-Day Siege of Surakarta Serangan Umum 4 Hari
- Part of the Indonesian National Revolution
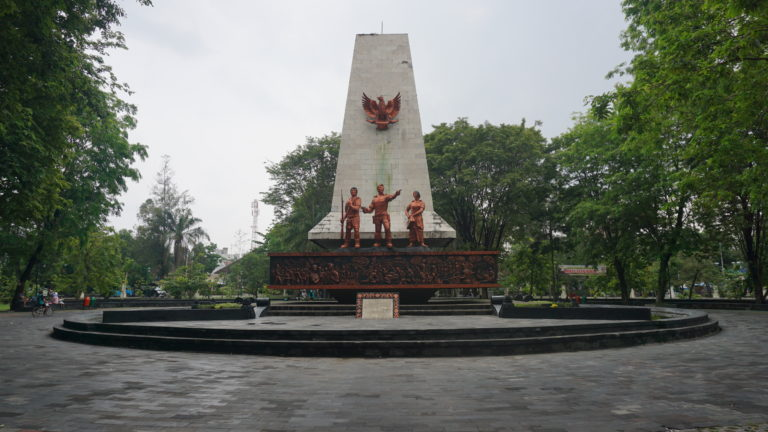
- Monument in Surakarta commemorating the siege
Date	7–10 August 1949
Location	Surakarta, Indonesia
Result	Dutch victory; Further strengthening Indonesian bargaining position before the Round Table Conference
Territorial changes	Indonesians repulsed, Surakarta is later ceded to Indonesia after 12 November agreement signed

Belligerents
Indonesia	Netherlands

Commanders and leaders
(Indonesia) Pakubuwono XII (Indonesia) Mangkunegara VIII (Indonesia) Col. Gatot Subroto (Indonesia) Lt. Col. Slamet Riyadi (Indonesia) Maj. Achmadi Hadisoemarto	(Netherlands) Maj. Gen. Mollinger (Netherlands) Maj. Gen. Van Ohl

Units involved
Indonesian National Armed Forces (TNI)	Royal Netherlands East Indies Army (KNIL): Korps Speciale Troepen (KST)

Strength
14,000–28,000	3,000–4,000

Casualties and losses
400 killed or more unknown number of non-combatants	32 soldiers killed 53 policemen 47 wounded

The siege of Surakarta was a military campaign during the Indonesian National Revolution. The Indonesian Republican forces (TNI) briefly infiltrated the city of Surakarta (also known as Solo) before being repulsed by Dutch special forces (RST). Despite the defeat, the battle, together with an earlier attack on Yogyakarta, provided a morale boost for the Indonesians.

== Background ==
From 1945 to 1948, the Dutch re-occupied various regions in Java, the territory of the Republic of Indonesia to Yogyakarta, Surakarta, and surrounding areas. In December 1948, the Dutch attacked and occupied the cities of Yogyakarta and Surakarta and declared that the Republic was destroyed and "no longer existed". In response the Indonesian army led by General Soedirman started a guerrilla war from surrounding areas and conducted large-scale raids into the cities of Yogyakarta and Surakarta, called Serangan Oemoem. The Indonesian troops managed to beat the Dutch troops and occupy both cities for several hours.

The leader of the raid on Yogyakarta was Lt. Col. Suharto. Suharto fled the area in a hurry after heavy fighting. United Nations observers stated that the uprising of the TNI in Yogyakarta had failed and the Dutch were in control again.

The leader of a similar raid on Surakarta on 7 August 1949 was Lt. Col. Slamet Rijadi, who was consolidating with Pakubuwono XII.

== Surakarta insurgency ==
The TNI attempted to capture Surakarta in Central Java before the armistice, and succeeded in many places to infiltrate the city. 325 men of the Regiment Speciale Troepen (RST) were hastily flown in to expel the TNI from Surakarta. In a few days time the insurgency was carried out. Approximately 400 from the Indonesian side were killed, while the Dutch side lost approximately 100 killed.

== Aftermath ==
This last battle of the RST showed again the qualitative superiority of the KST/RST over the Indonesian nationalist fighters. The leader of the raid on Surakarta on 7 August 1949 was Lt. Col. Slamet Rijadi. To commemorate this event, the main street of the city of Surakarta was renamed "Brigadier General Slamet Rijadi Street".

Royal Netherlands East Indies Army Commander General Dirk Cornelis Buurman van Vreeden surveyed the battlefield in Surakarta and then flew to Jakarta in order to advise High Commissioner Tony Lovink for a third Police Action to be conducted. Emotionally, Buurman van Vreeden accused the Indonesian Army of breaking the ceasefire and demanded a third police action. However, Lovink rejected Buurman van Vreeden's advice, stating his skepticism after receiving the reports on the battle.

The battle in Surakarta, together with the General Offensive of 1 March 1949 in Yogyakarta improved the negotiation standing for Indonesia's independence during the Dutch–Indonesian Round Table Conference in The Hague.
