= Fred Ormskerk =

Surinamese military leader

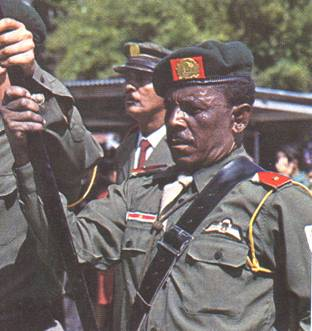
- Standard-bearer adjutant F.F. Ormskerk on Independence Day, November 25, 1975
- Born: Frederik Ferdinand Ormskerk; 26 April 1923; Nickerie, Surinam
- Died: 1 May 1980 (aged 57); Paramaribo, Suriname

Frederik Ferdinand "Fred" Ormskerk (26 April 1923 – 1 May 1980) was a Surinamese military leader. He was awarded many honors for his military services in Indonesia and Korea. After a KNIL training at Camp Casino, Australia, he arrived in Batavia (now Jakarta). There, he became a soldier in the newly formed Korps Speciale Troepen (KST), led by Captain Westerling. He was nicknamed Bikkel, which means "stud".

== Early life ==
Frederik Ferdinand Ormskerk was born in Nickerie District on 26 April 1923, to a military family. His father was one Alexander Reinier Francois Ormskerk (1888-1961) and is distantly related to Abraham George Eliis.

== Death ==
On 25 February 1980, Ormskerk along with a few others would participate in a coup d'état led by Dési Bouterse, which would result in Dési being appointed as the de-facto president. On 30 April 1980, Ormskerk would allegedly orchestrate an attempted counter-coup before being arrested, tortured and dying the next day on May 1.

== Awards ==
- Cross for Law and Liberty with Buckle Korea 1950
- United Nations Service Medal with Clasp Korea
- Award of the Korean War Service Medal
- Korean Presidential Unit Citation
- Certificate of Appreciation 38th Infantry Regiment in Korea
- Medal of honor attached to the Order of Orange-Nassau in gold with Swords
- Gold Medal due Prolonged, Honest and Faithful Service
