= Friesland Battalion =

Dutch and Indonesian National Revolution battalion

The Friesland Battalion (Dutch: Bataljon "Friesland", West Frisian: Bataljon "Fryslân"), officially the 1e Bataljon 9e Regiment Infanterie (1-9 R.I.) was a battalion made up of oorlogsvrijwilligers from Friesland that participated in the Dutch police actions of the Indonesian National Revolution.

== History ==
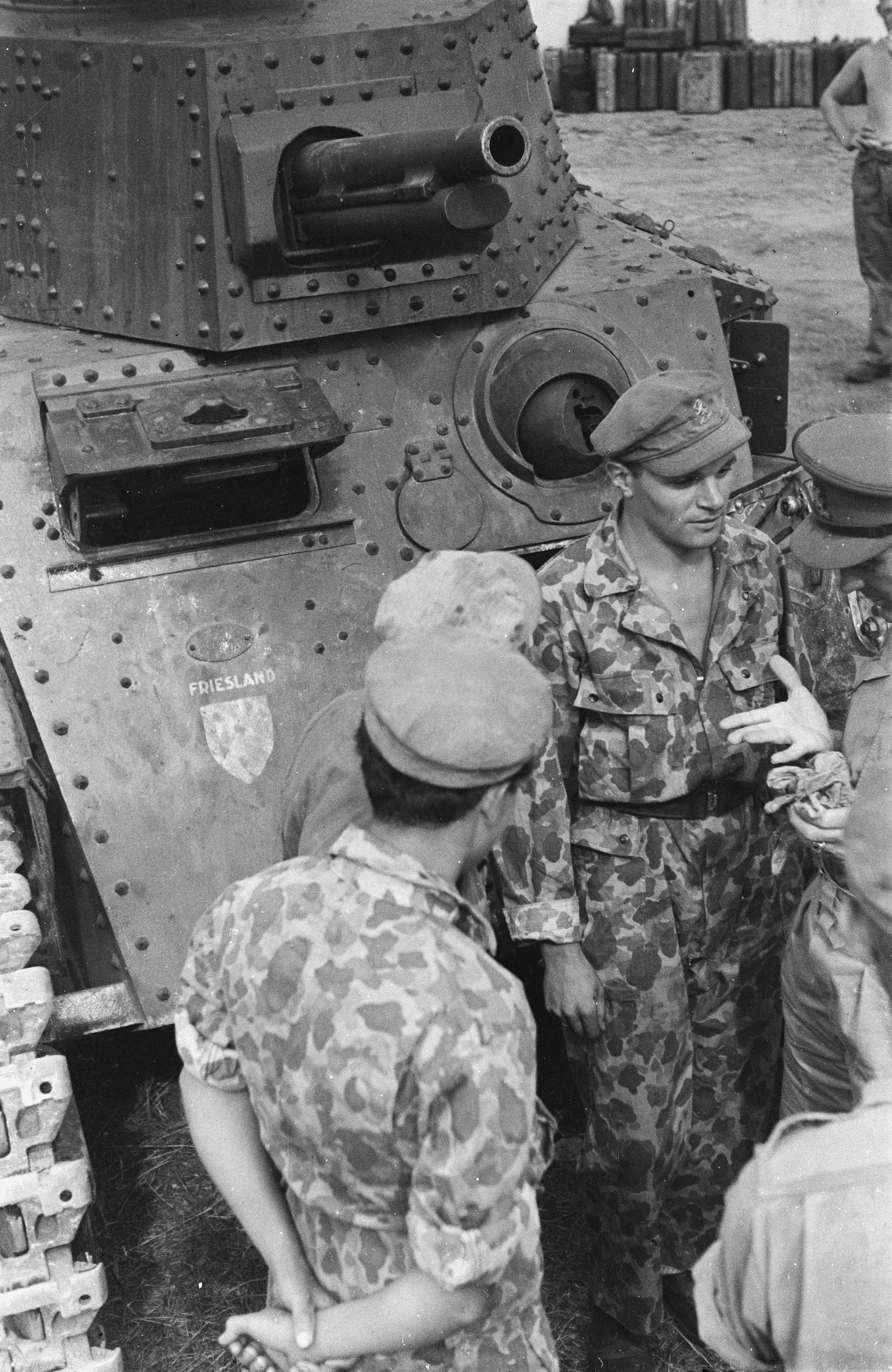
Lieutenant general P.L.G. Doorman (center-right, just inside frame) speaks to a crew member of a captured Japanese Type 89 I-Go medium tank during a visit to the Friesland Battalion in Cimahi, September 1946.

On 16 September 1945, the 1-9 R.I. was formed in Fochteloo from Frisian members of the Binnenlandse Strijdkrachten, the combined armed Dutch resistance organizations during World War II. The battalion was under the command of lieutenant colonel E. Wiersma and was sent to Wokingham in the United Kingdom for training and equipment; they also received basic Malay language lessons. Due to Lord Mountbatten's refusal to allow Dutch forces entry to the British-occupied Dutch East Indies, the battalion had to be diverted to Malacca following its arrival off the coast of Java in December 1945 aboard the Johan van Oldenbarnevelt.

On 29 March 1946, the Friesland Battalion landed in Batavia as part of V-Brigade and was given garrison duties in the Bandung-Cimahi area. After the first police action, it was given the same task in the Purbalingga area. The battalion had been engaged in several major engagements before the first police action began on 21 July 1947.

On 17 January 1948, the Renville Agreement was ratified and 1-9 R.I. stood down. On 27 April the battalion was recalled to the Netherlands and in July 1948 the men returned home from Batavia onboard the Zuiderkruis.

On 16 August 1948, the battalion was disbanded. A total of 29 men from the Friesland Battalion had lost their lives in Indonesia.

== Remembrance ==
The veterans of 1-9 R.I. were first honored on 20 April 1985 when Queen's commissioner Hans Wiegel awarded them the Resistance Memorial Cross.

In addition to an existing plaque in the Provincial House in Leeuwarden, on 25 August 2009 plaques were added to the UNIFIL-monument of the Regiment Infanterie Johan Willem Friso at the Johannes Post Barracks in Havelte, in memory of those who lost their lives in the East Indies and during the War in Afghanistan. On both plaques, the names of the casualties of the Friesland Battalion can be found.

== See also ==
- Oorlogsvrijwilligers
- Regiment Infanterie Johan Willem Friso
