= Slamet Rijadi =

Indonesian Army general

Ignatius Slamet Rijadi
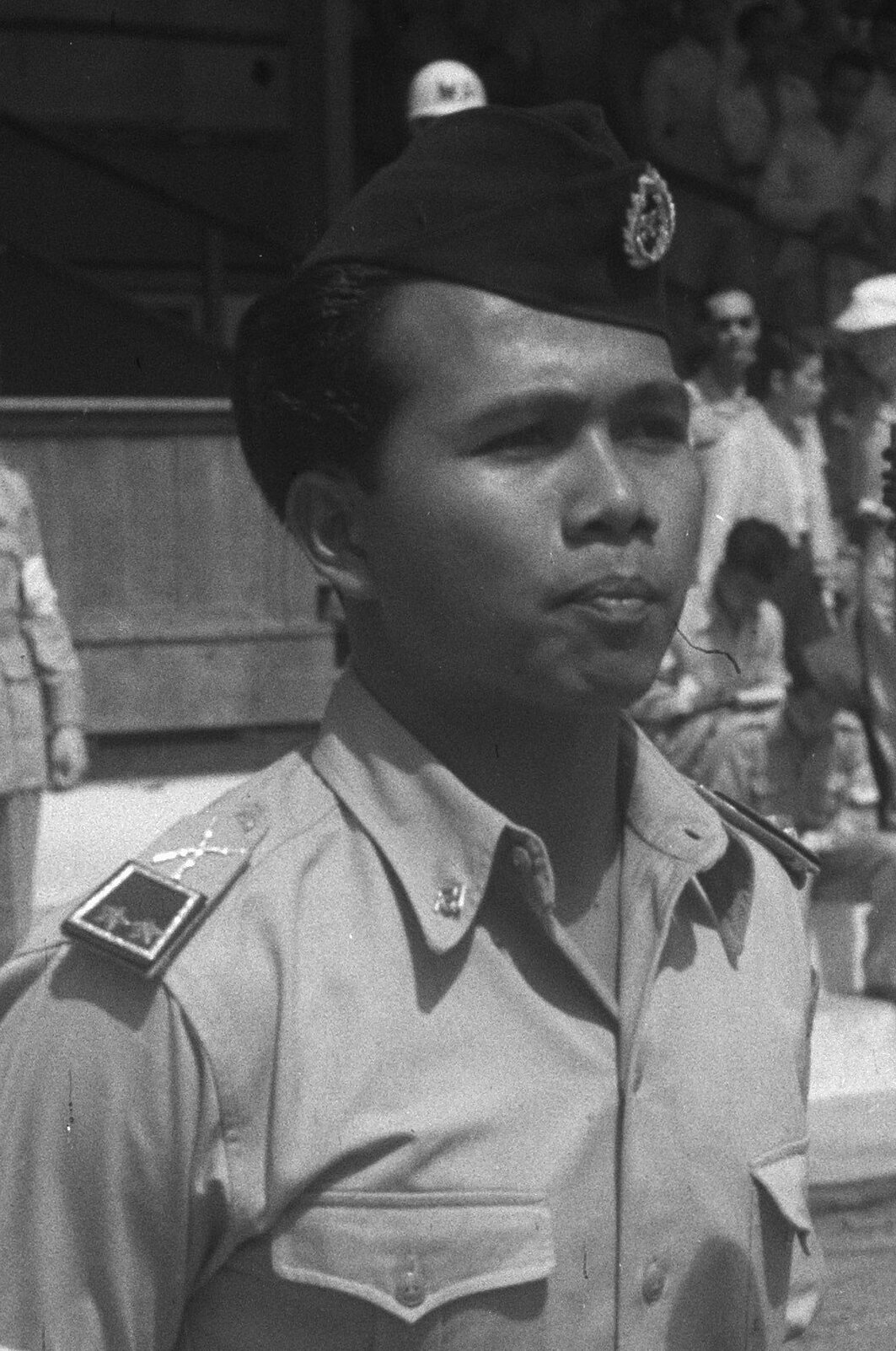
- Rijadi in 1949
- Born: Soekamto; 26 July 1927; Surakarta, Dutch East Indies
- Died: 4 November 1950 (aged 23); Ambon, Maluku, Indonesia
- Military career
- Allegiance: Indonesia
- Branch: Army
- Rank: Brigadier General
- Conflicts: Indonesian National Revolution; Operation Product; Operation Kraai; Invasion of Ambon †
- Awards: National Hero of Indonesia

Brigadier General Ignatius Slamet Rijadi (Perfected Spelling: Ignatius Slamet Riyadi; 26 July 1927 – 4 November 1950) was an Indonesian soldier.

Rijadi was born in Surakarta, Central Java, to a soldier and a fruit seller. Rijadi was "sold" to his uncle and renamed as a toddler to cure his illnesses, Rijadi was raised at his parents' home and studied at Dutch-run schools. After the Japanese occupation of the Dutch East Indies, Rijadi studied at a Japanese-run sailor's academy and worked for them upon graduation; he abandoned the Japanese army towards the end of World War II and assisted resistance operations for the rest of the occupation.

After Indonesia's independence on 17 August 1945, Rijadi led Indonesian forces in the Surakarta area during the revolution against the returning Dutch. Starting with a guerrilla campaign, by 1947, when he fought against Dutch offensives in Ambarawa and Semarang, he was in charge of the 26th Regiment. During a second Dutch offensive, Rijadi lost control of the city but soon retook it, later leading counter-offensives in West Java. In 1950, after the end of the revolution, Rijadi was sent to the Moluccas to put down a rebellion. After several months of planning and a month crossing Ambon Island, Rijadi was killed near the end of the operation by a rebounding bullet.

Since his death, Rijadi has received much recognition. The main street in Surakarta is named after him, as is a frigate in the Indonesian Navy, the KRI Slamet Riyadi. Awarded several medals in 1961 posthumously, Rijadi was given the title of National Hero of Indonesia on 9 November 2007.

== Biography ==
=== Early life ===
Rijadi was born with the name Soekamto in Surakarta, Central Java, Dutch East Indies, on 26 July 1927; he was the second son born to Underlieutenant Raden Ngabehi Prawiropralebdo, an officer in the sultan's army, and Soetati, a fruit seller. When Soekamto was one year old, his mother dropped him; he afterwards became frequently ill. To help cure his illness, his family "sold" him in a traditional Javanese ritual to his uncle, Warnenhardjo; after the ceremony, Soekamto's name was changed to Slamet. Although formally Warnenhardjo's son after the ceremony, Slamet was raised at his parents' house. He was a Roman Catholic, and it is said that since he was young Rijadi liked "'tirakat' fasting and 'mystical' things'".

Rijadi's primary education was done at Dutch-run schools. His elementary school was taken at the Hollandsch-Inlandsche School Ardjoeno, a private school owned and run by a Dutch religious group. While at Mangkoenegaran Middle School, where numerous students were named Slamet, he received an additional name, Rijadi; it is also during middle school that his father bought him back. After middle school and the Japanese occupation in 1942, he attended a sailor's academy in Jakarta. After graduation, he worked as navigator on a wooden ship.

Rijadi, who when not at sea lived in a dormitory near Gambir Station in Central Jakarta, occasionally met with underground resistance. On 14 February 1945, with Japan facing defeat in World War II, Rijadi and other sailors abandoned their dormitory and took up arms; Rijadi moved back to Surakarta and supported resistance movements there. He was not captured by the Japanese military police or other units for the remainder of the occupation, which ended with Indonesia's independence on 17 August 1945.

=== National revolution ===
After the Japanese surrender, the Dutch attempted to re-occupy the newly declared Republic of Indonesia; unwilling to be colonised, the Indonesians fought back. Rijadi began a guerrilla campaign against Dutch posts and quickly rose through the ranks. He was in charge of a Battalion of the 26th Regiment, 4th Division/Panembahan Senopati in Pacitan. During Operation Product, a general offensive by Dutch forces in mid-1947, Rijadi led Indonesian forces in several parts of Central Java, including Ambarawa and Semarang; he also led a cleansing force between mounts Merapi and Merbabu.

In September 1948 Rijadi was promoted and given control of four battalions of soldiers and one of student soldiers. Two months later, the Dutch launched a second attack, this time on the nearby city of Yogyakarta (then serving as the nation's capital). Although Rijadi and his troops launched attacks on Dutch forces approaching Solo through Klaten, ultimately the Dutch soldiers entered the city. Applying a divide and conquer policy, Rijadi was able to drive the forces out in four days.

During the remainder of the war, Rijadi was sent to West Java to fight against Raymond Westerling's Legion of the Just Ruler.

=== Later life and death ===
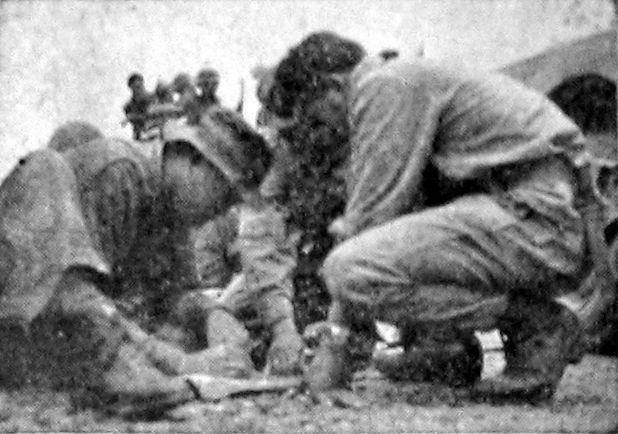
Rijadi (right) and Alexander Evert Kawilarang discussing strategy in Ambon

Not long after the end of the war, the Republic of South Maluku (RMS) declared its independence from the nascent Indonesia. Rijadi was sent to the frontline on 10 July 1950 as part of Operation Senopati. To retake the island of Ambon, Rijadi took half his forces and invaded the eastern shores, while the other half was tasked with invading from the northern coast. Although the second group experienced heavy resistance, Rijadi's group was able to take to the beach in native canoes unopposed; they later landed more infantry and armour.

On 3 October, the troops, along with Colonel Alexander Evert Kawilarang, were tasked with capturing the rebel capital at New Victoria. Rijadi and Kawilarang led a three pronged assault, with forces approaching by land from the north and east, and naval forces pulling directly into Ambon harbour. Rijadi's forces approached the city through mangrove swamps, a journey which took a month. During the trip, RMS snipers armed with jungle carbines and Owen guns shot constantly at the troops, often pinning them down.

Upon arriving in New Victoria, Rijadi's forces made short work of the RMS troops. However, he did not see the end of the battle. As Rijadi was riding atop a tank towards the final rebel stronghold on 4 November, a volley of machine gun fire erupted in his direction. A single bullet rebounded off the tank's armour and into Rijadi's abdomen. After being rushed to a hospital ship, Rijadi insisted on returning to the front; instead, the doctors gave him much morphine and attempted unsuccessfully to treat the wound. Rijadi died of wounds that night; the battle ended the same day. Rijadi was buried in Ambon.

== Legacy ==
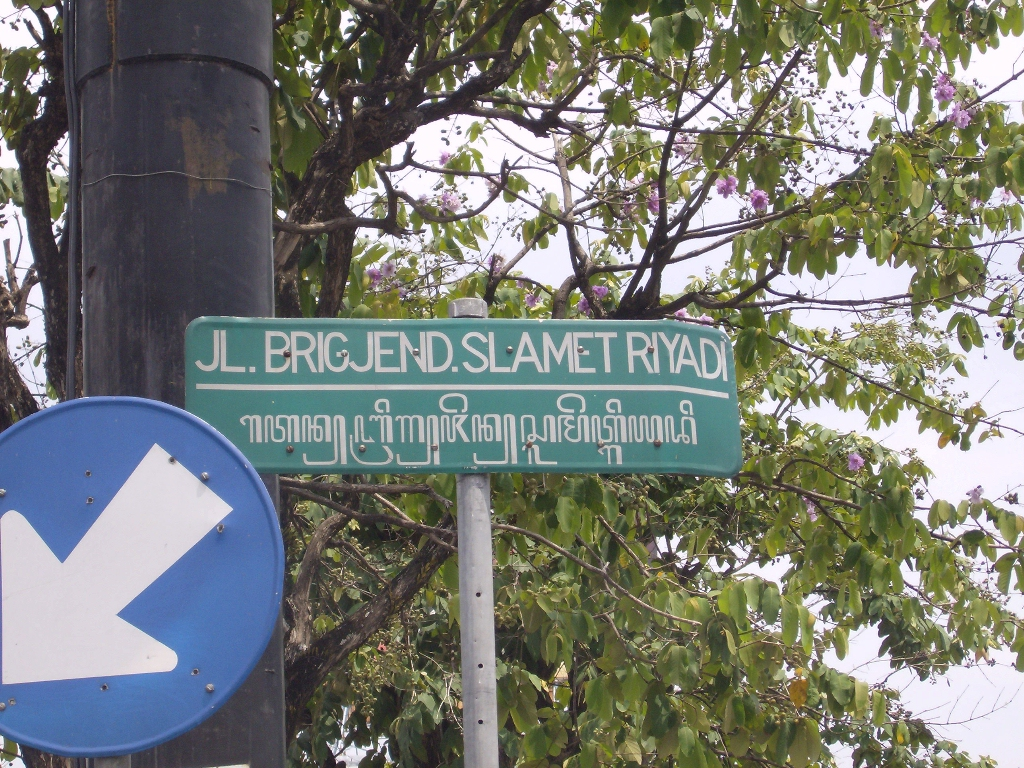
Road sign for Slamet Riyadi Street in Surakarta, Central Java

Numerous things have been named after Rijadi. The 5.8-kilometre (3.6 mi) long main road of Surakarta is named after the brigadier general. The KRI Slamet Riyadi, a frigate described as one of the most sophisticated in the Indonesian Navy, is named after him.

Rijadi has received numerous awards. He received several medals posthumously, including the Bintang Sakti in May 1961, the Bintang Gerilya in July 1961, and the Satya Lencana Bakti in November 1961. On 9 November 2007, President Susilo Bambang Yudhoyono gave Rijadi the title National Hero of Indonesia; Rijadi received the title along with Adnan Kapau Gani, Ida Anak Agung Gde Agung, and Moestopo based on Presidential Decree Number 66 / TK of 2007.
