= Muhammad Iftitah Sulaiman Suryanagara =

Indonesian politician (born 1977)

Iftitah Sulaiman Suryanagara
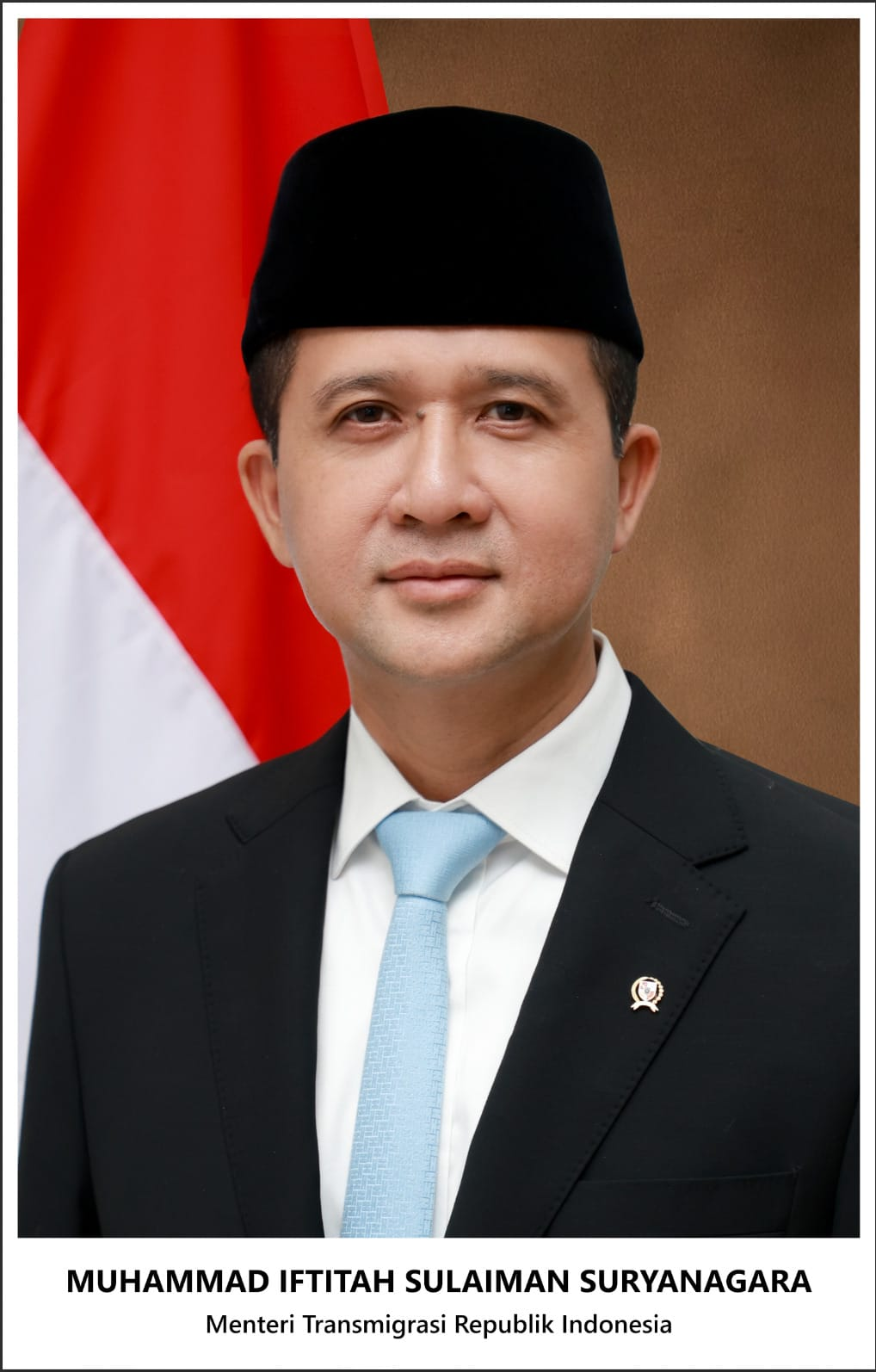

12th Minister of Transmigration
- Incumbent
- Assumed office 21 October 2024
- President: Prabowo Subianto

Personal details
- Born: 10 March 1977 (age 49)
- Party: Democratic Party

Muhammad Iftitah Sulaiman Suryanagara is the current Minister of Transmigration of the Republic of Indonesia.

Born on March 10, 1977, in Pandeglang, Banten, Suryanagara grew up during a time of national transition. He graduated top of his class from the Indonesian Military Academy (Akmil) in 1999, receiving the Adhi Makayasa award.

His military career spanned two decades, with him serving in frontline service as well as roles centered on international diplomacy and peace building. As a young officer, he played a symbolic role representing the youth of the Indonesian Armed Forces (TNI) in 1999. He later helped establish an armored cavalry battalion in conflict-affected Aceh, and led operations ranging from combat to humanitarian missions. He also participated in additional deployments, such as with the United Nations Interim Force in Lebanon (UNIFIL) and was nominated for the General Dwight D. Eisenhower Award.

Alongside his professional work, Suryanagara earned a doctorate in political science from Padjadjaran University in Bandung, where his dissertation examined eclecticism in voting behavior in Indonesia.

In October 2024, Suryanagara was appointed Minister of Transmigration under President Prabowo Subianto’s administration. His vision, known as Transmigration 5.0, claims to use a more holistic approach than his predecessors to position Indonesia as a global example of sustainable development and demographic transformation.
