= Rachmat Muljomiseno =

Indonesian politician

Rachmat Muljomiseno (9 June 1919 – 1980s), also known by his alias Tjuk, was an Indonesian politician who served as a member of the People's Representative Council from 1971 until 1982. Previously, he served as Minister of Trade from 1958 until 1959, Director of Bank Negara Indonesia (a state-owned bank) from 1957 until 1958, and was a military officer who fought in the Indonesian National Revolution attaining the rank of major.

== Early life and education (1919-1940) ==
Rachmat Muljomiseno was born in Kandangan, Temanggung, on 9 June 1919. He studied at Alagemene Middelsbare School (AMS) part B in Yogyakarta (now SMAN 3 Yogyakarta). As a young man, he was able to read and write. At that time, only about 10 percent of Indonesians could read and write, despite only about 10 percent of Indonesians could read or write. He also had a high school diploma, something few Indonesians had.

== World War II (1940-1945) ==
=== Royal Netherlands Indies Army ===
In 1940, when the Netherlands was occupied by Nazi Germany, he graduated from AMS and became a Royal Netherlands Indies Army (KNIL) officer, after entering training in Bandung. If he had finished his training, he would've held the equivalent rank to that of a lieutenant. However, he was unable to finish his training, as in 1942, the dutch were defeated by the Japanese. And like most other KNIL members, he was also detained by the Japanese.

=== Japanese occupation ===
Following the Japanese victory over the Dutch in Indonesia, he like most other KNIL members, was detained by the Japanese. Soon after this, he became unemployed for half a year, before becoming a traveling merchant by using his bicycle. During this time, he married a woman named Soetariyah and worked as a compiler at the Jakarta statistics office. In 1943, he worked at Syomin Ginko (former De Algemene Volkskrediet Bank which is now Bank Rakyat Indonesia). At that time, this institution was led by Margono Djojohadikusumo. During the Japanese occupation, he did not want to join the "military fever" like most of the young men who entered the Homeland Defenders (PETA). Prior to the proclamation of August 17, 1945, Rachmat was already the deputy head of the Syomin Ginko branch in Purworejo.

== Indonesian National Revolution (1945-1950) ==
It was only after Indonesia's independence and revolution broke out that he rejoined the military again. Like most former KNIL officers, he was once stationed at the army headquarters in Yogyakarta. In 1946, he was listed as Deputy Chief of Military Combat in the Ministry of Defense Intelligence Section B with the rank of captain. In addition, he has also been a liaison officer in Jakarta with the rank of major. Around 1948, as mentioned in What & Who Are Some Indonesians, he worked at the Banking Trading Center and participated in the smuggling of vanilla and silver materials to the Philippines.

== Banking career ==
After the end of the revolution, he returned to work in the financial sector as he had started since the Japanese occupation. He participated in leading the Indonesian Banking Corporation with Jusuf Wibisono. He was its director from 1950 to 1956 and led the education of bank cadres in Jakarta

In the banking world, he has also been in important positions. From 1957 to 1958 he was Director of Bank Negara Indonesia (BNI 46).

After not becoming a minister, Rachmat continued to struggle in the banking world and remained active as a politician. From 1963 to 1964, he was chairman of a private bank.

== Political career ==
In April 1952, Nahdatul Ulama (NU) left the Indonesian Muslim Syuro Council (Masyumi) and became an independent party. At that time, many doubted that NU would be able to become a party because it was considered that it did not have a cadre of experts to face Indonesia's political struggles. In the words of Kiai Haji Wahab Hasbullah, expert cadres are like car drivers.

Unexpectedly, in the 1955 General Election, NU was ranked 3rd, or a level below Masyumi. However, NU's seats in parliament jumped sharply, from only 8 to 45. According to Andree Feillard in NU vis-a-vis Negara, the majority of NU's votes came from Java.

=== Minister of Trade ===
From 1958 to 1959 he was Minister of Trade. During his tenure, the Decree of the Minister of Trade No. 2933/M dated May 14, 1959, which prohibited foreigners (including Chinese) from trading retail in rural areas. Since 1967, Rachmat has been a member of the DPRGR. And when NU was merged into the United Development Party (PPP), Rachmat was also a member of the DPR from 1971 to 1982. His commission was not far from finance and trade.
