= Achmadi Hadisoemarto =

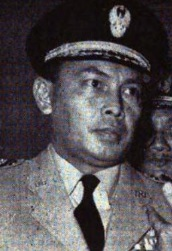

Minister of Information
- In office 27 August 1964 – 26 March 1966
- President: Sukarno
- Preceded by: Roeslan Abdulgani
- Succeeded by: Wilhelm Johannis Rumambi

Personal details
- Born: 5 June 1927 Ngrambe, Ngawi
- Died: 2 January 1984 (aged 56) Jakarta

Military service
- Allegiance: Indonesia
- Branch/service: Indonesian Army
- Years of service: 1948–1970
- Rank: Major general TNI
- Battles/wars: Indonesian National Revolution: Siege of Surakarta

Major Genderal TNI (Purn.) Achmadi Hadisoemarto (EYD: Akhmadi Hadisumarto; 5 June 1927 – 2 January 1984) was an Indonesian soldier and politician.

== Biography ==
At the age of 14 he moved from his hometown of Ngawi to Surakarta. Then at the age of 18 he was trusted to lead Laskar kere, a small militia band during the Indonesian National Revolution. In 1948, Sukarno gave him the rank of major and was appointed Commander of Battalion 2 in the KRO (Kesatoean Reserve Oemoem) TNI. After the military reorganisation, he became commander of Detachment II of the XVII Brigade of the TNI, concurrently commander of the Solo City Military Command (KMK) and commander of the Student Battalion of the V KRU Brigade. He led the Four-Day General Strike in Surakarta which was quite successful in hitting the Dutch troops.

=== Minister ===
Major General Achmadi later served as Minister of Information in the enhanced Dwikora Cabinet. He was briefly detained during the New Order era for 10 years. He died on 2 January 1984 and was buried at the Tanah Kusir Public Cemetery in Jakarta. As a form of appreciation for his struggle, the Surakarta City government built a statue of Major Achmadi which was inaugurated on 7 August 2010 to coincide with the Four Day General Strike in Surakarta.

== See also ==
- Slamet Rijadi
- Siege of Surakarta
