= Transmigration program =

Indonesian migration program

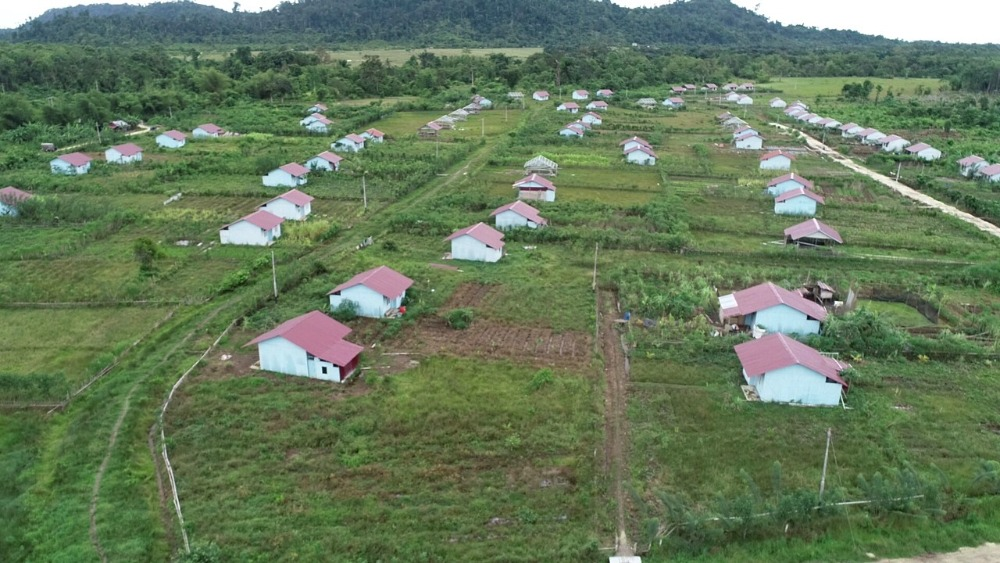
Transmigration settlement of Sigulai in Simeulue Regency, Aceh

The transmigration program (Indonesian: transmigrasi, from Dutch, transmigratie) was an initiative of the Dutch colonial government and later continued by the Indonesian government to move landless people from densely populated areas of Indonesia to less populous areas of the country. This involved moving people permanently from the island of Java, but also to a lesser extent from Bali, Lombok and Madura to less densely populated areas including Kalimantan, Sumatra, Sulawesi, Maluku and Papua. The program is currently coordinated by Ministry of Transmigration.

The stated purpose of this program was to reduce the considerable poverty and overpopulation on Java, to provide opportunities for hard-working poor people, and to provide a workforce to utilize better the natural resources of the outer islands. The program, however, has been controversial as fears from native populations of "Javanization" and "Islamization" have strengthened separatist movements and communal violence. The incomers are mostly Madurese and Javanese but also from other populated areas such as Hindu Balinese.

== History ==
=== Under the Dutch ===
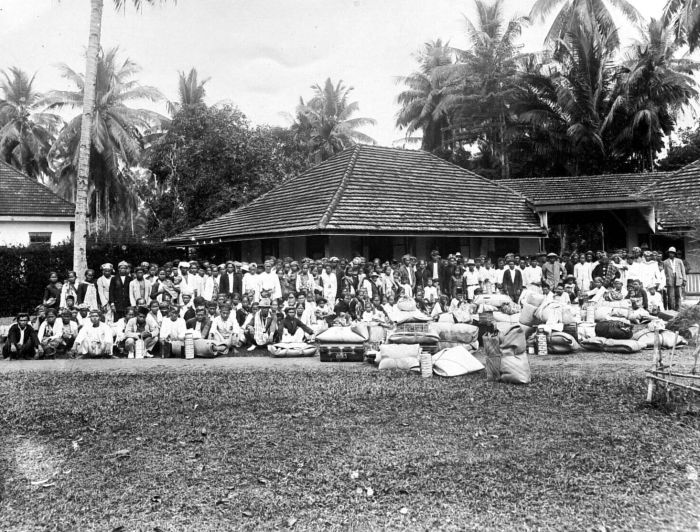
Javanese contract workers in plantation in Sumatra during colonial period, cirica 1925.

The policy was first initiated by the Dutch colonial government in the early nineteenth century to reduce crowding and to provide a workforce for plantations on Sumatra. The program diminished during the last years of the Dutch era (the early 1940s) but was revived following Indonesian independence, in an attempt to alleviate the food shortages and weak economic performance during Sukarno's presidency in the two decades following World War II.

In the peak year of 1929, in the Sumatra's east coast, more than 260,000 contract workers were brought, 235,000 of them from Java. Workers entered into a contract several years long as coolie; if a worker asked for the early termination of the contract in the company ('desertion'), he could be punished with hard labour. The mortality rate was very high among the coolies and abuse was common.

=== Post-independence ===
1995 ABC news report on the impact of transmigration on the Dani people in Papua.

After independence in 1949, under President Sukarno, the program continued and was expanded to send migrants to more areas of the archipelago. At its peak between 1979 and 1984, 535,000 families (almost 2.5 million people) moved under the program. It had a significant impact on the demographics of some regions; for example, in 1981, 60% of the three million people in the southern Sumatra province of Lampung were transmigrants. During the 1980s, the program was funded by the World Bank and Asian Development Bank as well as by many Western governments who appreciated Suharto's anti-communist politics. However, as a result of the 1979 energy crisis and increased transportation costs, the budget and plans for transmigration were severely reduced.

In August 2000, after the 1997 Asian financial crisis and the fall of the New Order, the Indonesian government again reduced the scale of the transmigration program due to a lack of funds.

Under the restructured Department of Manpower and Transmigration (Indonesian: Departemen Tenaga Kerja dan Transmigrasi) the Indonesian government maintains the transmigration program, although on a far smaller scale than in previous decades. The department assists in annually relocating approximately 15,000 families, or nearly 60,000 people. The rate has shown gradual increases in recent years with funding for transmigration activities at $270 million (2.3 trillion IDR) and a target of relocating 20,500 families in 2006. The program again intensified in 2019.

== Aims ==
The stated purpose of the program, according to proponents in the Indonesian government and the development community, was to move millions of Indonesians from the densely populated inner islands of Java, Bali and Madura to the outer, less densely populated islands to achieve a more balanced population density. This would alleviate poverty by providing land and new opportunities to generate income for poor landless settlers. It would also benefit the nation as a whole by increasing the utilization of the natural resources of the less-populous islands. The program may have been intended to encourage the unification of the country through the creation of a single Indonesian national identity to augment or replace regional identities. The official position of the Indonesian government is that there is no separation of "indigenous people" and settlers in Indonesia, because Indonesia is a country "of indigenous people, run and governed by and for indigenous people". It argues instead for the use of "vulnerable population groups" which can include both tribal groups and the urban poor.

== Effects ==
=== Economic ===
In many examples, the program failed in its objective to improve the situation of the migrants. The soil and climate of their new locations were generally not nearly as productive as the volcanic soil of Java and Bali. The settlers were often landless people lacking in farming skills, let alone skills appropriate to the new land, thus compromising their own chances of success.

=== Environmental ===
Transmigration has also been blamed for accelerating the deforestation of sensitive rainforest areas, as formerly sparsely populated areas experienced considerable increases in population. Migrants were often moved to entirely new "transmigration villages", constructed in regions that had been relatively unimpacted by human activity. By settling on this land, natural resources were used up, and the lands became overgrazed, resulting in deforestation.

=== Social and political ===
Transmigration in Indonesia covers various regions throughout the country, including Sumatra, Kalimantan, Sulawesi, Maluku, Nusa Tenggara region, and Papua. The program was originally intended to reduce density in densely populated areas such as Java and Bali and to develop the economy in relatively sparsely populated areas, which were considered to have great potential in the agriculture, plantation, and fisheries sectors.

However, transmigration often triggers social conflict, especially with indigenous people in the destination area. Indigenous people often feel marginalized and lose access to land and natural resources that are an important part of their lives.

The program has resulted in communal clashes between ethnic groups that have come into contact through transmigration. For example, in 1999, the local Dayaks and Malays clashed against the transmigrant Madurese during the Sambas riots and the Dayaks and Madurese clashed again in 2001 during the Sampit conflict, resulting in thousands of deaths and thousands of Madurese being displaced.

== Figures ==
Transmigration from Java and Madura have resulted in large numbers of the population elsewhere, particularly in Sumatra, Borneo, and Papua. Based on 2010 census figures and ethnic prevalence, roughly 4.3 million transmigrants and their descendants live in North Sumatra, 200 thousand in West Sumatra, 1.4 million in Riau, almost a million in Jambi, 2.2 million in South Sumatra, 0.4 million in Bengkulu, 5.7 million in Lampung, 100 thousand in Bangka-Belitung, almost 400 thousand in Riau Islands, totalling some 15.5 million in Sumatra alone. In Kalimantan, there are some 700 thousand transmigrants and their descendants in West Kalimantan, 400 thousand in Central Kalimantan, almost 500 thousand in South Kalimantan, and over a million in East Kalimantan, totalling 2.6 million for the whole area. Though numbers are a state secret, well over a million transmigrants are thought to reside in Papua and West Papua. Total Javanese and other transmigrants in Indonesia number roughly 20 million throughout the country.

Transmigrants are not exclusively ethnic Javanese and/or Muslims. For example, in 1994, when East Timor was still part of Indonesia, the largest transmigrant group was Hindu Balinese (1,634 people) followed by Catholic Javanese (1,212 people).

== Criticism ==
Indigenous peoples saw the program as a part of an effort by the Java-based Indonesian government to extend greater economic and political control over other regions, by moving in people with closer ties to Java and loyalty to the Indonesian state. The government agencies responsible for administering transmigration were often accused of being insensitive to local customary or adat land rights. This was especially true on Borneo with the Dayak population. In addition to general public criticism, the potential marginalization of native and Indigenous members of the host communities has also been highlighted in research surveying long-term effects of transmigration programs across a number of impacted communities.

The environmental damage associated with these projects was caused less by ignorance than by inattention, poor follow-up, and lack of accountability during project implementation. Many environmental issues were identified at project appraisal: the potential for soil erosion, the possibility of declining soil fertility, need for protection against pests and disease, possible adverse effects on wildlife and deforestation, impact on indigenous people, and the need to strengthen the borrower's capacity for managing natural resources. But often, the audits found, the proposed mitigatory measures were unrealistic or were insufficiently monitored by the government.

=== Papua ===
In the provinces of Papua and West Papua, the program has resulted in the Papuan population of Melanesian origin totalling less than the population of non-Melanesian (principally Austronesian) origin in several locations. According to Papuan independence activists, the Papuans have lived on the New Guinea island for an estimated 50,000 years, but have been outnumbered in less than 50 years by mostly Javanese Indonesians. They criticize the program as part of "an attempt to wipe out the West Papuans in a slow-motion genocide". There is open conflict between migrants, the state, and indigenous groups due to differences in culture—particularly in administration, and cultural topics such as nudity, food and sex. Religion is also a problem as Papuans are predominantly Christian or hold traditional tribal beliefs while the non-Papuan settlers are mostly Muslim. A number of Indonesians have taken Papuan children and sent them to Islamic religious schools.

The recorded population growth rates in Papua are exceptionally high due to migration.

Detractors of the program argue that considerable resources have been wasted in settling people who have not been able to move beyond subsistence level, with extensive damage to the environment and deracination of tribal people. However, very large scale American and Anglo-Australian strip mining contracts have been developed on the island, as well as other Indonesian islands.

The transmigration program in Papua was only formally halted by President Joko Widodo in June 2015, and remained like that in subsequent Prabowo Subianto presidency as laws made by previous Joko Widodo administration legally forbids transmigration of non-Papuans into Papua. However, remaining 10 transmigration areas previously built are still maintained and revitalized as new economics centers. Internalized Local Transmigration Program established by the Ministry of Transmigration, Central Papua Provincial Government, and Highland Papua Province Government to populate these provinces with Papuans from other populated Papuan provinces as those new provinces lacking population but have rich untapped natural resources of gold, coffee, and other agricultural and horticultural commodities.

== See also ==
- Ministry of Villages, Development of Disadvantaged Regions, and Transmigration
- Internal colonialism
- Nam tiến
- Sri Lankan state sponsored colonisation schemes
- Internal migration in Brazil
  - March to the West
- Demographics of Indonesia
- Demographic threat
- Israeli settlements in West Bank
- Sinicization
  - Chinese settlements in Tibet
  - Migration to Xinjiang
- Project IC, in neighbouring Malaysia
