= Oorlogsvrijwilligers =

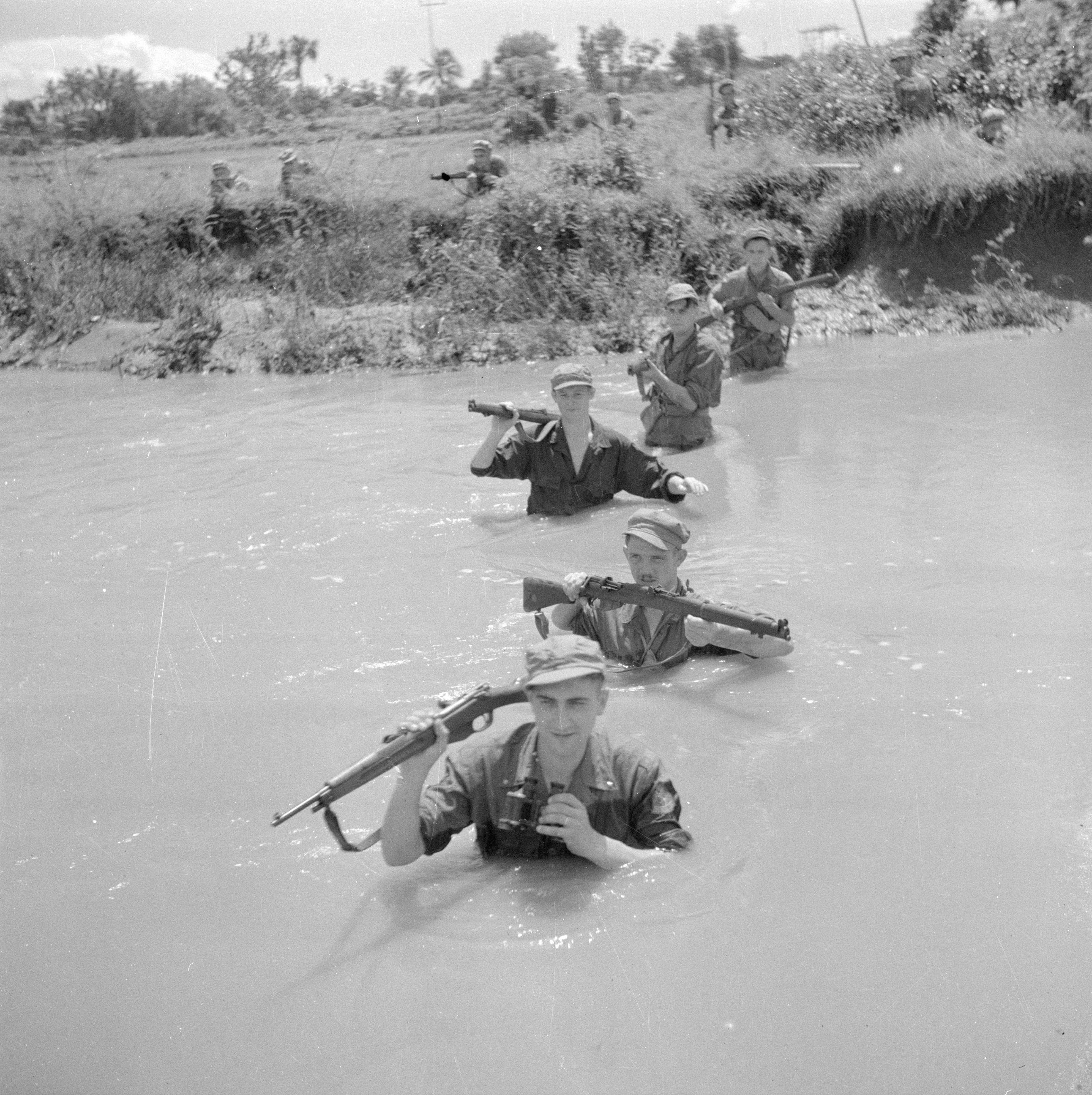
OVWs on patrol wading through a river on Java, March 1946.

In order to contain the violence in the Dutch East Indies after the Japanese capitulation in 1945 and to restore colonial order, the Netherlands sent battalions of Oorlogsvrijwilligers (OVWs; English: War Volunteers) to the colony. They were recruited in 1944 and 1945, mostly in the southern provinces of the Netherlands, and initially intended for deployment in Europe. Others had signed up for the fight against Japan in the summer of 1945.

The emergency situation in the East Indies prompted the Schermerhorn–Drees cabinet to send the Dutch military overseas. They arrived in British Malacca in November 1945. The British authorities, who temporarily exercised authority in the Dutch East Indies after the war in Asia, refused to admit the Dutch troops there. They feared that this would escalate the already tense political situation. The fact that there was little international sympathy for the Dutch efforts to restore colonial authority in Indonesia may also have been a factor. It was not until late February 1946 that the Oorlogsvrijwilligers were admitted and took over the positions of the British. They were stationed in enclaves around a number of large cities on Java and Sumatra.

In total, approximately 25,000 OVW personnel would go to the East Indies, of which 5,000 to 6,000 were assigned to the Mariniersbrigade and the rest to the Royal Netherlands Army. Five brigades were formed from this last group, the staffs of which were composed of officers from the Royal Netherlands East Indies Army. To the numbers mentioned must be added several thousand OVW personnel who served on ships of the Royal Netherlands Navy and with the Netherlands Naval Aviation Service in the Dutch East Indies. Later, the Oorlogsvrijwilligers were supplanted by much larger numbers of Dutch conscripts.

From the very beginning of their presence in the East Indies, the OVWs were involved in combat operations. The Indonesian nationalists did not accept the renewed military presence of the Dutch and responded with armed actions against the Dutch enclaves. More large-scale military action by the OVWs came during Operation Product in the summer of 1947.

Over the course of 1948, the Oorlogsvrijwilligers were demobilized - except for one battalion that the Dutch army command thought it needed for Operation Kraai, which was to be completed at the end of 1948. This battalion was only able to leave service in 1949. Not all OVW staff were repatriated. Some chose to extend their employment and others emigrated to Australia or New Zealand.

== Notable Oorlogsvrijwilligers ==
- Gerard Leonard Reinderhoff (1904–1977), military attaché
- Herman Vos (1910–1965), independent politician and mayor
- Jan Schelvis (1917–1992), resistance fighter during World War II
- Jan Loman (1918–2006), visual artist
- Daniël de Moulin (1919–2002), resistance fighter during World War II, surgeon, and medical historian
- Ted Meines (1921–2016), resistance fighter during World War II and veterans' rights activist
- Chris van Oosterzee (1922–1989), resistance fighter during World War II and financial manager
- Ben Bouman (1923–2015), resistance fighter during World War II and military historian
- Halbe Brandsma (1923–2000), Knight of the Military Order of William for actions in East Java on 2 May 1946
- Gerard Hueting (1924–2017), resistance fighter during World War II
- Willem Oltmans (1925–2004), resistance fighter during World War II, author, and investigative journalist
- Carel van Lookeren Campagne (1925–2017), state secretary and director of Douwe Egberts and Heineken
- Gerardus Antonius Adrianus Adelaar (1925–1966), Reformed Political Party politician and mayor

== See also ==
- Friesland Battalion
