= History of Bandung =

History of Indonesian city

Bandung is a city in the western part of Java island in Indonesia. Beside its own city administration, Bandung also serves as the capital of the West Java province.

== Early settlement ==
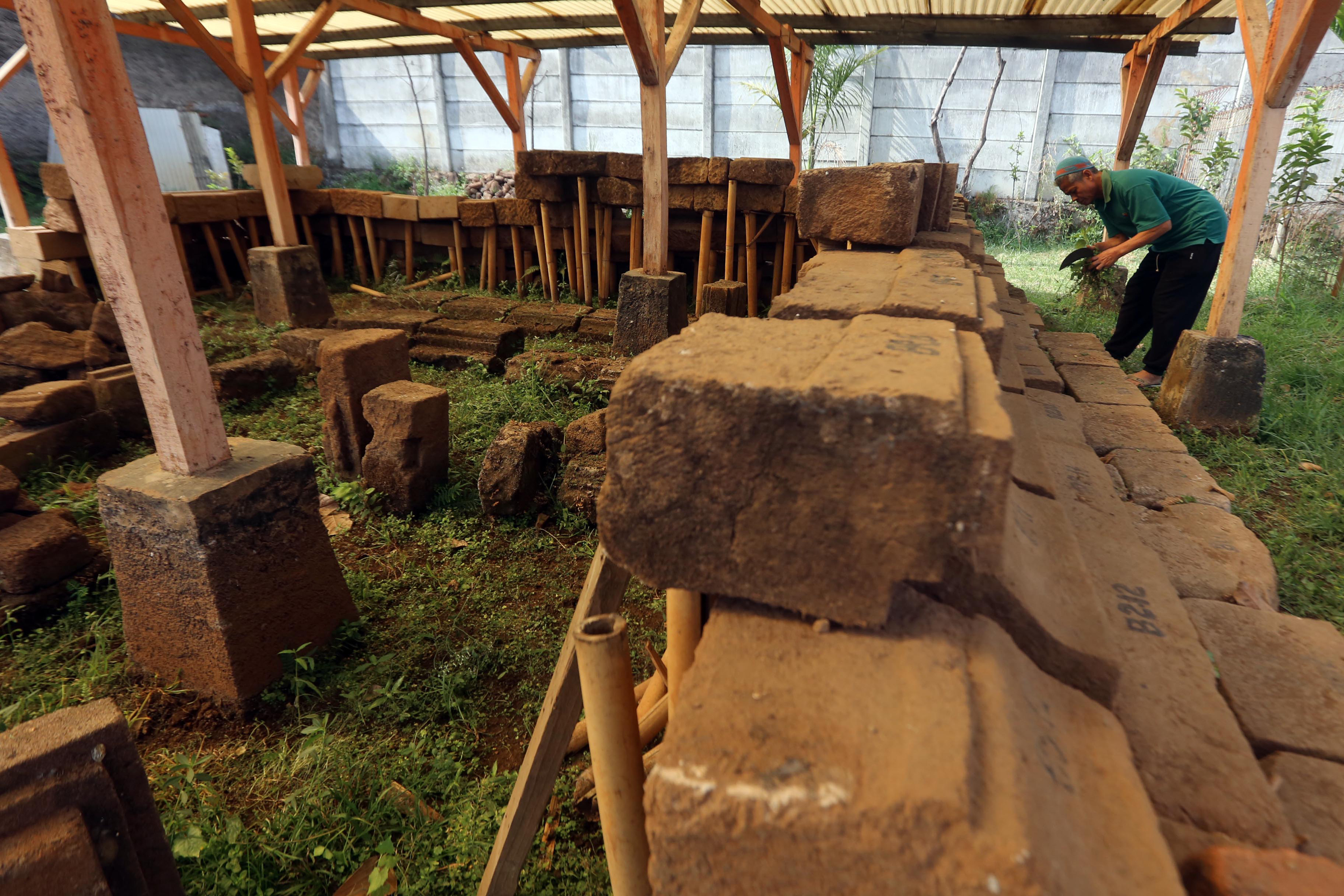
The stones of 7th-century candi Bojongmenje ruins in Rancaekek, Bandung Regency.

Although the oldest written historical reference to the Priangan region dates back to circa 14th century, that was found in Cikapundung inscription, where the region was one of the settlement within the Kingdom of Pajajaran, the Priangan region has been home for early human since prehistoric era, at least since 9,500 years before present. There have been some earlier prehistoric archaeological findings of early human settlements, in Pawon cave in Padalarang karst area, West of Bandung, and around the old lake of Bandung.

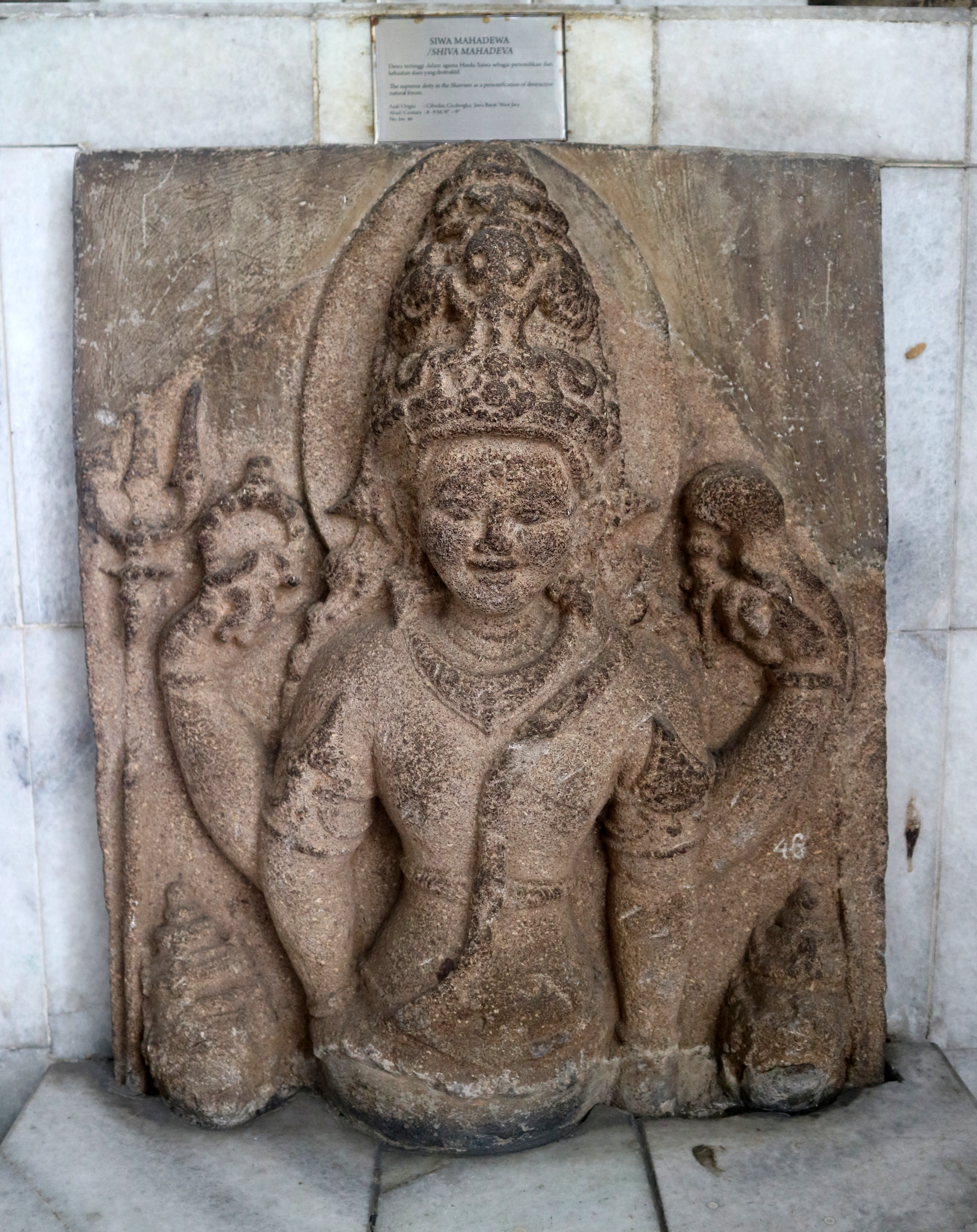
Shiva Mahadeva of Cicalengka, Bandung Regency. Sunda Kingdom period 8th to 9th century.

The ruin of Bojongmenje temple was discovered in Rancaekek area, Bandung Regency, east of Bandung city. The temple is estimated to be dated from early 7th century CE, around the same period — or even earlier, than Dieng temples of Central Java.

Not far from Bojongmenje temples, the statue of Hindu god Shiva Mahadeva was discovered in Cibodas village, Cicalengka Subdistrict, Bandung Regency, West Java. The style of the Hindu statue estimated dated from circa 8th to 9th Century CE possibly from the Sunda Kingdom period. The artifact inventory number is 46, now is the collection of National Museum of Indonesia, Jakarta.

== Dutch colonial period ==
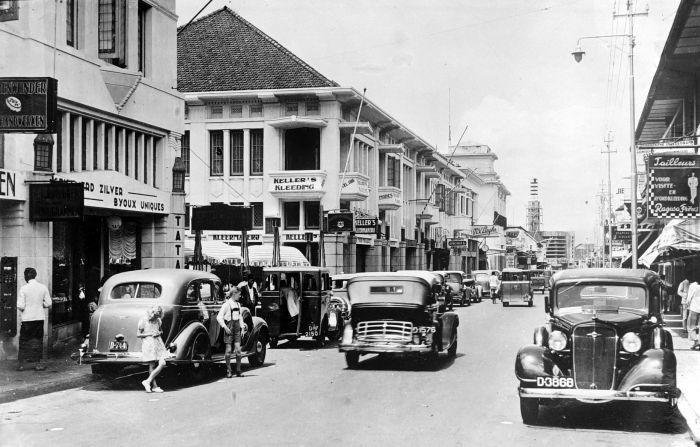
Braga Street in the mid-1930s.

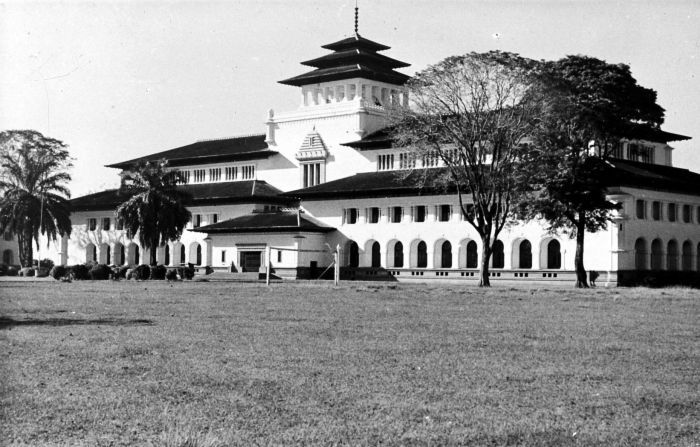
The Dutch-built Gedung Sate

During the 17th and 18th centuries, the Dutch East Indies company (VOC) established a small plantation area in the fertile and prosperous Bandung area. A supply road connecting Batavia (now Jakarta), Bogor, Cianjur, Bandung, Sumedang and Cirebon was built in 1786.

In 1809, Louis Bonaparte, then ruler of the Netherlands and its colonies due to Napoleon Bonaparte's establishment of this puppet state, ordered the Dutch Indies Governor H.W. Daendels to improve the defense system of Java island against the threat of the British. Daendels built a 1000 km road joining the west and east coasts of Java. Since the northern part of West Java at that time was mostly swamp and marsh, the road was diverted through Bandung. The Great Postweg (now Jalan Asia-Afrika) was laid down in 1810.

Local folklore has it that when Daendels was walking along the edge of Cikapundung river, he was amazed by a site he found. He then put a stick at the edge of the Cikapundung and said: "Zorg, dat als ik terug kom hier een stad is gebouwd!" ('Make sure that when I return, a city has been built here!'). Today, this site is the geographical center of Bandung. R.A. Wiranatakusumah II, the regent of Bandung regency at that time, moved its office from Krapyak, in the south, to a place near a pair of holy city wells (sumur Bandung), which is today the alun-alun (city square). He built his istana (palace), masjid agung (the grand mosque) and pendopo ("pavilion") in the classical orientation. The pendopo faces Tangkuban Perahu mountain, believed to have a mystical ambiance.

The fast growth of Bandung started from the area around the Jalan Asia-Afrika, the original central business district. Also concentrated in the area is the Javanese alun-alun (public square) just to the south of the road, the former residence of the Bupati, and the great mosque. In 1850, Bandung was appointed as the Residence for the part of West Java named Pariangan, which until then settled in Cianjur. There were 12,000 inhabitants around 1850. A great factor of the growth of Bandung was because of the relocation of some Departments from Batavia to Bandung. In 1880, the first major railroad in Indonesia, linking Batavia and Bandung, was laid down. It boosted light industry in Bandung. Chinese migrants flocked in to help run the facilities, services and vendor machines. A small Chinatown district can still be recognised in the vicinity of the railroad station.

It started in 1914 with the Department of War, followed in 1921 by the Department of Roads and Transportation. In 1906, Bandung was given the status of gemeente (municipality) and then later as stadsgemeente (city municipality) in 1926. From 1906 to 1949, Bandung grew from a medium-sized town with 38.000 inhabitants to the third City in Nederlands-Indië with 590.000 inhabitants. In 1929, Bandung approved the 'Framework plan' city planning, which covered an area of 12.758 ha, divided in plans for mainly the Northern- and partly the Southern areas of the town. This plan which followed the garden city concept was successfully applied in the Northern part of the town where most of the European population lived. The north part was designed with large public spaces, spacious and green residential areas in which public and private greens are integrated. The roads were fit out with, originally, a consequent planting of trees. But the valley of the river Cikapundung - which was ones fitted up as a park landscape (IJzermanpark) is nowadays occupied by spontaneous kampung-settlements. The North part was divided in an Army area, a Governmental area, areas for dwelling houses and villas, small-housing for the common people and kampung-areas for the labor people. The Chinese inhabitants lived in the Pasar Baru quarter, southwest of the railroad. The natives lived in the Southern part of the town, like many of the Indo-Europeans.

Coat of Arms of Bandung, adopted in 1928.

Bandung's location, in a low area between two mountainous regions, is strategically advantageous for military defense. In the 1930s, the Dutch East Indies government had planned to move the capital from Batavia to Bandung, and built military barracks, a building housing the colonial Department of State-Owned Enterprises (Department van Gouvernmentsbedrijven, nicknamed Gedung Sate), and several others. This plan did not come to fruition following the failure of the Dutch to reclaim Indonesia after World War II.

=== Growth of plantation areas ===
The fertile area of the Parahyangan mountains surrounding Bandung allowed for productive tea plantations. In the 19th century, cinchona plants, and therefore quinine, were introduced by Franz Junghuhn. The old quinine factory (originally incorporated as N.V. Bandoengsche Kininefabriek) still exists in the city.

Bandung then developed itself into an exclusive European resort with hotels, cafes and shops. Rich plantation owners came during the weekends and so did girls and businessmen from the capital, Batavia. The promenade Braga Street grew into an elite area of cafes, restaurants and boutique shops. Two art-deco style hotels, Savoy Homann and Preanger, became two major accommodations there. The Concordia Society (now known as Merdeka Building) was built as a club house of these rich people, complete with a large ballroom and a theater. The title of "Parijs van Java" was given to this city.

== Struggle for Independence ==
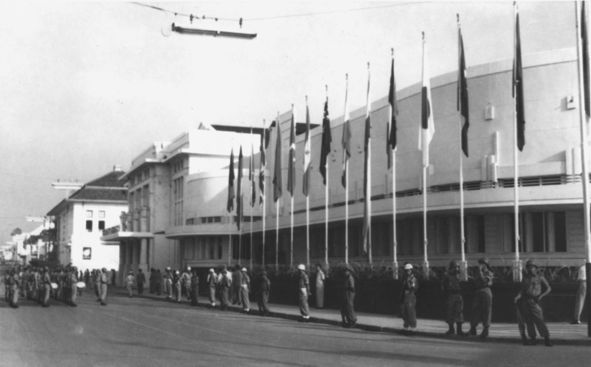
Gedung Merdeka during the Asian-African Conference in 1955

Bandung was decided as the provincial capital of West Java, after the independence.

Since October 1945, there had been several extreme Islam groups in West Java with the main goal of establishing an Islamic state in Indonesia (Darul Islam). One of this movements was 'Laskar Hitam', a militia group that kidnapped and killed Otto Iskandardinata, RI's Minister of State (1945). Other victims of similar groups: Poerdiredja, the regent of Priangan, Oekar Bratakoesoemah, the mayor of Bandung and Niti Soemantri, the local leader of the Central Indonesian National Committee (KNIP) in Priangan.

Prior to the Dutch politionele acties (Police Actions), there was an ultimatum for the Indonesian combatants in Bandung to leave, given by the British military command, that temporarily (before the Dutch came back) tried to restore order. As for the answer, on 24 March 1946, the southern part of Bandung was deliberately burned down as they were leaving. This event is known as Bandung Lautan Api or the Bandung Sea of Fire. A heroic song "Halo-halo Bandung" was sung along by these hundreds of patriots.

During the evacuation process of March 1946, a member of Indonesian militia Mohammad Toha smuggled several sticks of dynamite into a large scale ammunition dump guarded by Japanese and Dutch troops, near the Dutch military HQ in Dayeuh Kolot.

After overpowering the guards, he put the dynamite in several warehouses full of ammunition. He then committed suicide by igniting the dynamite. The massive explosion killed him and several Dutch and Japanese troops in the area. The explosion created a small lake ("situ") in Dayeuh Kolot. The main street in the area is called "Mohammad Toha Street".

== Independence ==
On 23 January 1950, a rebel group called the Just King Armed Forces (Indonesian: Angkatan Perang Ratu Adil, APRA), led by Captain Raymond Westerling (a former Dutch military officer) and King Sultan Hamid II from Kalimantan (Borneo) attacked Indonesian army's Siliwangi Division HQ in Bandung. Lt. Col. Lembong and 93 other Indonesian soldiers and officers were killed. On 24 January 1950, the rebels tried to attack Jakarta, but the rebellion was quashed in a fierce battle in Pacet, near Jakarta. Sultan Hamid II was arrested, but Capt. Westerling managed to escape to Singapore.

In 1955, the first Asian-African Conference (Indonesian: Konferensi Tingkat Tinggi Asia-Afrika) was held in Bandung. Twenty-nine countries attended the conference. The Asian-African leaders who attended the summit included Nehru (India), Nasser (Egypt), Tito (Yugoslavia), Nkrumah (Ghana), U Nu (Myanmar), and others. This conference is one of the preparation for the establishment of the Non-Aligned Movement in Belgrade in 1961.

After being elected in 1955, a new parliament body called the Constitutional Assembly (Indonesian: Konstituante), was established. It was tasked with creating new constitution to replace the Provisional Constitution of 1950. This new body held meetings in Bandung for several years without any result. The Constituent Assembly was dissolved by President Sukarno in a decree issued on 5 July 1959, which also reinstated the 1945 Constitution.

On 10 May 1963, a minor traffic accident (collision between 2 motorcycles) occurred in the campus of Bandung Institute of Technology. Two ITB students were involved in this accident: an ethnic Chinese student and an Indonesian student. The traffic accident turned into a racial brawl on the basketball field. The leaders of "Dewan Mahasiswa" (DM)/student council at ITB such as Muslimin Nasution (later becoming a government minister), Siswono Yudo Husodo (later becoming a government minister), and Sutjipto (later becoming a leader of PKS party) used this event as the start of a movement against the establishment of ethnic Chinese tribe by Baperki (an ethnic Chinese organization influenced by Indonesian Communist Party/PKI). This movement was also directed against NASAKOM (Nasionalis, Agama dan Komunis) ideology from President Sukarno. The movement disagree with the Communist part of NASAKOM and they assumed that all ethnic Chinese community supported Baperki/Indonesian Communist Party. The next day, there was a large scale public demonstration by this movement against Baperki and ethnic Chinese. Unfortunately there are other organizations/people who use this event to start a large scale racial riot in Bandung that spread to other cities: Yogyakarta, Surabaya, Malang and Medan. Muslimin Nasution and other leaders of Student Council were arrested by Police. Muslimin was sentenced to 3 years in prison for starting the riot.

On 30 September 1965, there was a failed coup attempt by revolutionary council (aka G30S). The Military Chief Of Staff, General Nasution escaped and went to Bandung for protection from the loyal Siliwangi division. According to General Nasution, near his mother residence in Bandung, members of Indonesian communist party (PKI) also dig new wells for burying their enemies.

On 6 September 1970, there was a football match between ITB students and cadets from Military academy. The game ended in a riot and brawl. Rene L. Conrad, an ITB student, was kidnapped and murdered by the Military cadets. Unfortunately the case remain unsolved today.

In 1976, Doctor Habibie (later becoming Indonesian President) established a state owned, aircraft manufacturing company called Industri Pesawat Terbang Nusantara (IPTN). Later this company was renamed into PT Dirgantara Indonesia (PT DI).

In 1978, after a People Consultative Assembly session in Jakarta, there were demonstrations against the re-election of President Suharto by ITB students. Police disbanded the "Dewan Mahasiswa" (Student council) movement in ITB and the leaders were arrested. The university was closed for 3 months and the new Minister of Education announced "Normalization of University Life" (NKK) to quell the student movement.

On 11 March 1981, an extreme Islamist group called "Jamaah Imron" attacked Cicendo police station in Bandung. The movement was quashed by Indonesian police, but several members escaped to Medan, North Sumatra and hijacked Garuda airplane to Bangkok 2 weeks later. The passengers and crews were rescued by Indonesian special force in the Don Muang airport, Bangkok, Thailand. The pilot and a soldier were shot death during the rescue attempt.

From 5 April 1982 to 8 January 1983, there were several eruptions at Mt Galunggung in Tasikmalaya and Bandung was buried in several inches of ash.

== 21st century ==
On 24 December 2000, as part of the Christmas Eve bombings, there were bomb attacks against churches in Bandung. The bombs exploded prematurely and the perpetrators were arrested.

On 21 February 2005, a landslide occurred at the garbage dumpsite in Leuwigajah, Bandung. 143 people were killed by the landslide. After this fatal accident, the Leuwigajah dumpsite was closed and Bandung had a major problem in garbage management. The entire city was turned into a giant garbage dump ("kota sampah"). The mayor of Bandung was unable to solve the problem and the governor of West Java was forced to search for new garbage dumpsites. Fortunately the problem is solved now.

Today, Bandung has grown beyond its city core with the Bandung Raya plan. Traffic in Bandung is infamous with its complex, congested and chaotic nature. The city core is practically uprooted, old faces are torn down, lot sizes regrouped, and what was idyllic residence is now bustling chain supermarkets and rich banks. However Bandung is always a weekend break destination for people living in Jakarta. The Cipularang Toll Road was recently completed, reducing travel time from Jakarta. Bandung is a popular tourist destination in Indonesia and a gateway for tourists who visit destinations around greater Bandung areas. Currently, Bandung is also known as a culinary, shopping, and nature tourism destination. The major attraction to come to Bandung is the food and fashion shopping. The food in Bandung is well known for their wide varieties and taste. Bandung is also a place to do fashion shopping with its numerous factory outlets and stock centres.
