= Kodam III/Siliwangi =

Indonesian army regional Military command

III Military Regional Command/Siliwangi
- Komando Daerah Militer III/Siliwangi; Kodam III/Siliwangi
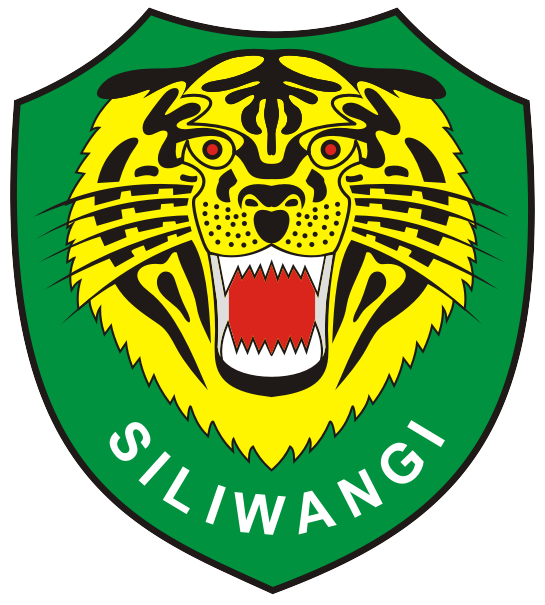
- Coat of arms Kodam III/Siliwangi
- Active: 20 May 1946 – present
- Branch: Indonesian Army
- Part of: Indonesia Regional Military Command
- Garrison/HQ: Bandung
- Mottos: Esa Hilang, Dua Terbilang (Indonesian Proverb) "Either vanished or be excels" or "Try earnestly to achieve goals"
- March: Siliwangi March
- Mascot: Tiger
- Engagements: Indonesian National Revolution, separatist uprisings in 1950s and 1960s

Commanders
- Commander: Maj.Gen. Kosasih
- Chief of Staff: Brig.Gen. Faisol Izuddin Karimi

Military Regional Command III/Siliwangi (Indonesian: Komando Daerah Militer III/Siliwangi or Kodam III/Siliwangi) is an Indonesian Army Regional Military Command that covers Banten and West Java province.

The division was formed during the Indonesian National Revolution by what was then known as the People's Security Army (TKR). It was stationed in West Java where much of its membership was recruited, and bore the name of a 15th-century kingdom located in this area and of that kingdom's King Siliwangi. it became a Territorial Division (Soldier & Territorium) on 24 July 1950, and a military regional command, or KODAM, in 1959.

== History ==
From May 1946, the division was commanded by then-colonel Abdul Haris Nasution and his adjutant was Umar Wirahadikusumah, and slightly later Amirmachmud was the Division Commander's Chief of Staff. Kemal Idris was also among the division's officers. All of these would play a significant role in Indonesia's military and political life during the coming decades.

Under the terms of the cease-fire agreement of January 1948 known as the Renville Agreement, the Siliwangi Division was obliged to evacuate West Java and hand it over to the Dutch, and to move over to Central Java. During this lull in fighting the colonial troops, the division was involved in the bloody crackdown against the People's Democratic Front (FDR) in the Madiun Affair, in the course of which thousands were killed.

In December 1948, the Dutch army launched the surprise attack known as Operation Kraai, swiftly capturing the Indonesian provisional capital at Yogyakarta and most of Indonesian territory. The Siliwangi Division at that time conducted a fighting retreat back to its original position in West Java, where its men were familiar with the terrain, which was therefore the best suited for this unit to conduct guerrilla warfare in. On arrival in West Java, the division fought both the Dutch and the Militia groups DI/TII.

In 1953 Nasution wrote a book called The Fundamentals of Guerrilla Warfare, based on his own experience of fighting and organising guerrilla warfare, which would become one of the most studied books on guerrilla warfare along with Mao's works on the same subject matter.

Poncke Princen, a former Dutch colonial soldier who went over to the Indonesian rebels, took part in that "Long March" and was appointed a staff officer in the division.

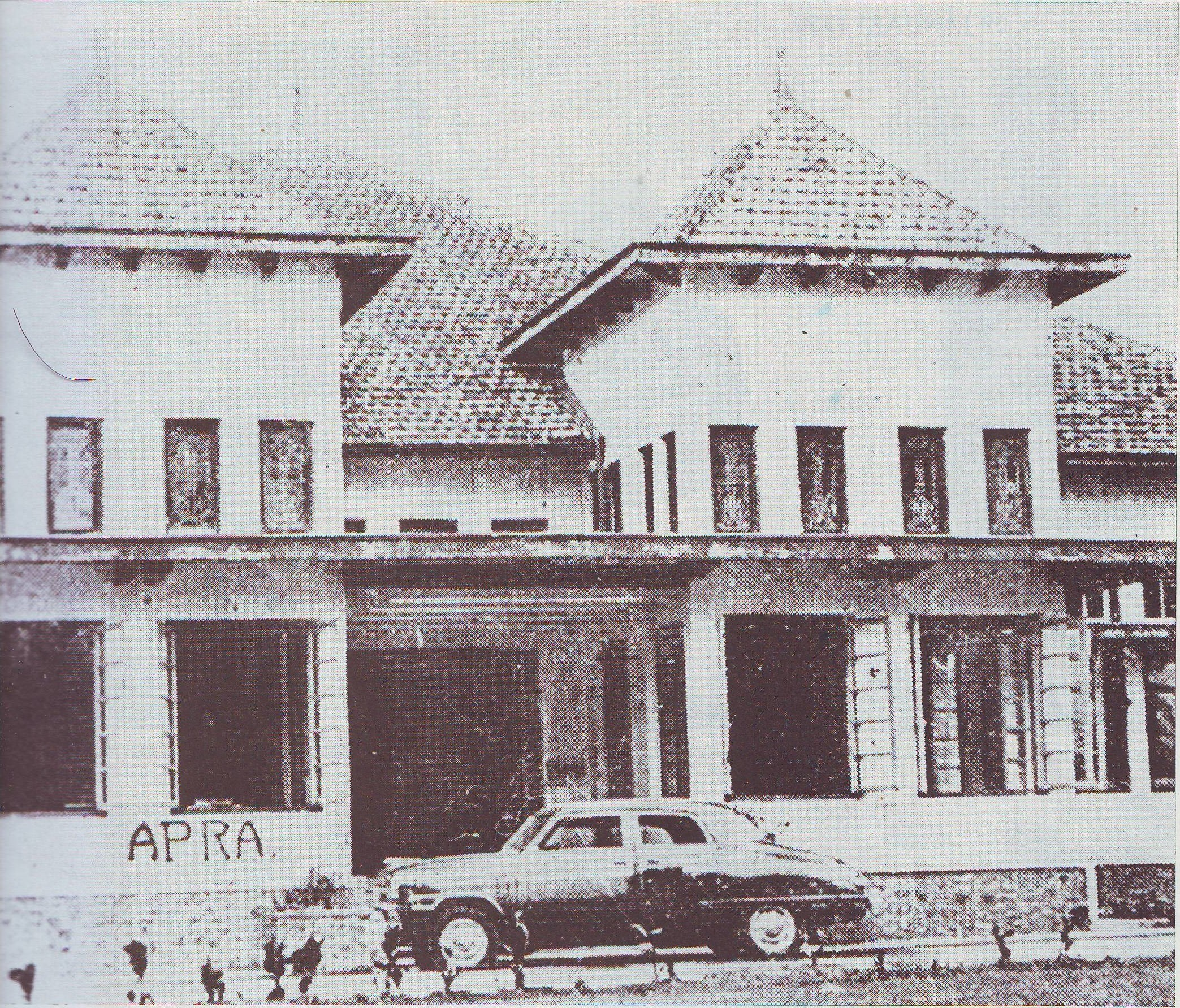
Siliwangi Division headquarter in Bandung occupied by the APRA force

On 23 January 1950, a rebel group called Legion of the Just Ruler (Angkatan Perang Ratu Adil; APRA) led by Captain Raymond Westerling attempted to seize Bandung during the APRA Coup d'état. Lt. Col. Lembong and 93 other Indonesian soldiers and officers were killed. On 24 January 1950, the rebels tried to attack Jakarta, but the rebellion was quashed in a fierce battle in Pacet, near Jakarta. Sultan Hamid II was arrested, but Capt. Westerling managed to escape to Singapore (then still a British colony).

In late 1951, the division was described as being 'a loose umbrella for five infantry brigades (each of which had up to four infantry battalions) strung across the western third of Java.' The post of commander of Tentara & Territorium III, the territorial military command encompassing west Java, was in effect synonymous with control of the division.

Battalion 530 of the Siliwangi Division was involved in the 30 September Movement events in 1965. Following the later overthrow of Sukarno and the installation of the Indonesian "New Order" under Suharto, the Siliwangi Division's then-commander, HR Dharsono, belonged to a faction dubbed by scholars as "New Order Radicals". Together with Kemal Idris and Sarwo Edhie Wibowo of KODAM II/Bukit Barisan (Sumatra), this group wanted political parties to be dismantled and replaced with non-ideological groups which emphasised development and modernisation.

"Factionalism within the army leadership, once a severe problem, no longer disrupted operations in the early 1990s. Traditional divisional identification continued to have some significance, however, especially regarding that developed in the former Siliwangi, Diponegoro, and Brawijaya divisions, which covered western, central, and eastern Java, respectively, during the war of independence and the years immediately thereafter. The detachment of the Jakarta area from the control of the Siliwangi division and the restructuring of the army from a divisional basis to the territorial Kodam system diffused the powers of the divisions and eliminated warlordism."

== Territorial units ==
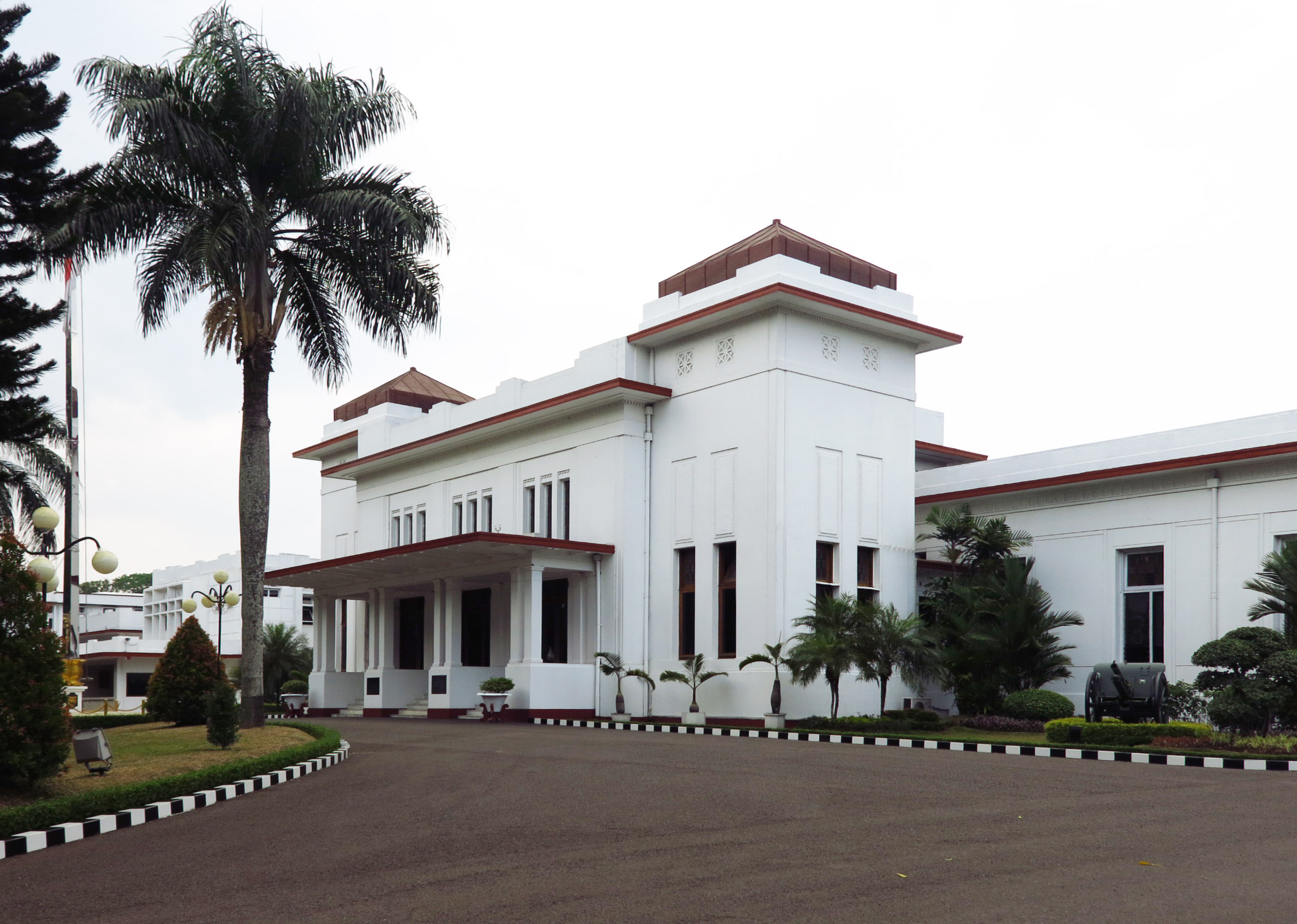
Headquarter kodam III Siliwangi, formerly Het Paleis van de Legercommandant (Palace of the Commander of War), by Indies architect Wolff Schoemaker, designed in New Indies Style

4 Military Subarea Commands (Korem) and an Independent Military District Command (Kodim) comprise the command, which today covers the two provinces of West Java and Banten.

1. Korem 061/Surya Kencana (SK)

- Kodim 0606/Bogor City
- Kodim 0607/Sukabumi
- Kodim 0608/Cianjur
- Kodim 0621/Bogor Regency and Metropolitan Area
- Kodim 0622/Pelabuhan Ratu

2. Korem 062/Taruma Nagara (TN)

- Kodim 0609/Bandung Regency
- Kodim 0610/Sumedang
- Kodim 0611/Garut
- Kodim 0612/Tasikmalaya
- Kodim 0613/Ciamis

3. Korem 063/Sunan Gunung Jati (SGJ)

- Kodim 0604/Karawang
- Kodim 0605/Subang
- Kodim 0614/Cirebon City
- Kodim 0615/Kuningan
- Kodim 0616/Indramayu
- Kodim 0617/Majalengka
- Kodim 0619/Purwakarta
- Kodim 0620/Cirebon Regency

4. Korem 064/Maulana Yusuf (MY)

- Kodim 0601/Pandeglang
- Kodim 0602/Serang
- Kodim 0603/Lebak
- Kodim 0623/Cilegon

5. Kodim 0618/Bandung City (Standalone/Independent)

=== Training regiment ===
The 3rd Regional Training Regiment (Resimen Induk Kodam III/Siliwangi) serves as the training regiment for new recruits to the territorial command. It is organized in the following manner:

- Regiment HQ
  - RMC III/Siliwangi NCO School
  - Basic Combat Training Center
  - National Defense Training Command
  - Specialist Training School
  - Enlisted Personnel Training Unit

== Combat/Combat Support Units ==
=== Directly reporting units ===
- 15th Infantry Brigade/Kujang II

- Brigade HQ
- 301st Raider Infantry Battalion/Prabu Kian Santang
- 310th Infantry Battalion/Kidang Kencana
- 312th Infantry Battalion/Kala Hitam

- 300th Raider Infantry Battalion/Brajawijaya (formerly Banjar Kedaton)

=== Territorial infantry ===
- 315th Infantry Battalion/Garuda (under Korem 061)

=== Territorial defense and development infantry ===
- 34th Territorial Development Inf Bde/Cakra Buana
- 87th Territorial Development Inf Bde/Salakanagara

=== Combat support ===
- 4th Cavalry Battalion/Kijang Sakti
- 3rd Combat Engineering Battalion/Yudha Wyogrha
- 3rd Air Defence Artillery Battalion/Yudha Bhuana Yaksa
- 14th Air Defence Artillery Battalion/Pratiti Wira Yudha
- 4th Field Artillery Battalion/Parahiyangan
- 5th Field Artillery Battalion/Pancagiri
- 4th Cavalry Company/Tarantula Hitam Cakti

== Support units ==
- TC III/Siliwangi Military Police Command (Pomdam III/Siliwangi)
- TC III/Siliwangi Public Relations Bureau (Pendam III/Siliwangi)
- TC III/Siliwangi Adjutant General's Office (Anjendam III/Siliwangi)
- TC III/Siliwangi Military Physical Fitness and Sports Bureau (Jasdam III/Siliwangi)
- TC III/Siliwangi Medical Department (Kesdam III/Siliwangi)
- TC III/Siliwangi Veterans and National Reserves Administration (Babiminvetcadam III/Siliwangi)
- TC III/Siliwangi Topography Service (Topdam III/Siliwangi)
- TC III/Siliwangi Chaplaincy Corps (Bintaldam III/Siliwangi)
- TC III/Siliwangi Finance Office (Kudam III/Siliwangi)
- TC III/Siliwangi Legal Affairs (Kumdam XIV/Hasanuddin)
- TC III/Siliwangi HQ and HQ Services Detachment (Denmadam III/Siliwangi)
- TC III/Siliwangi Information and Communications Technology Oiffice (Infolahtadam III/Siliwangi)
- TC III/Siliwangi Logistics and Transportation Corps (Bekangdam III/Siliwangi)
- TC III/Siliwangi Signal Corps (Hubdam III/Siliwangi)
- TC III/Siliwangi Ordnance Corps (Paldam III/Siliwangi)
- TC III/Siliwangi Engineers Command (Zidam III/Siliwangi)
- TC III/Siliwangi Cyber Operations Unit (Sandidam III/Siliwangi)
- TC III/Siliwangi Intelligence Detachment (Deninteldam III/Siliwangi)
