= Lembong =

Lembong is a Minahasan and Chinese Indonesian surname. Notable people with the surname include:

- Adolf Gustaaf Lembong (1910–1950), Indonesian military officer
- Thomas Lembong (born 1971), Indonesian politician
