= APRA coup d'état =

Coup d'état in Indonesia

APRA coup d’état
- Part of Age of Gerombolan
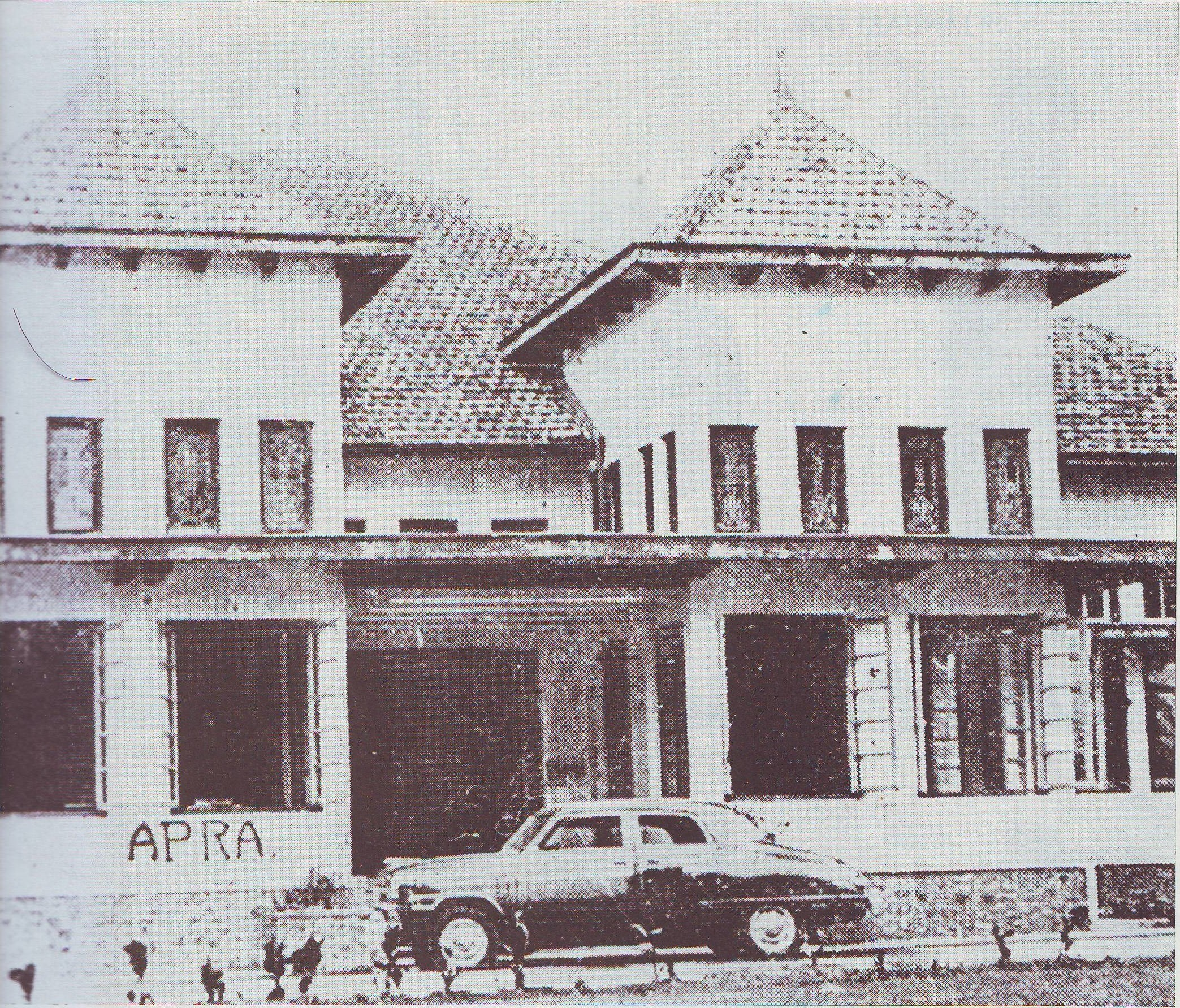
- Siliwangi Division headquarters occupied by the APRA during the coup
Date	22–23 January 1950 (1 day)
Location	Bandung and Jakarta, State of Pasundan, Indonesia
Result	Indonesian victory; Coup succeeds initially and APRA temporarily occupies Bandung; APRA troops run out of ammunition and retreat after negotiations; Accelerated integration of federal states into the Republic of Indonesia by 17 August 1950

Belligerents
Legion of the Just Ruler (APRA)	Indonesia; TNI

Commanders and leaders
Captain Raymond Westerling; Sultan Hamid II	Colonel Ali Sadikin; Adolf Gustaaf Lembong †

Units involved
	Siliwangi Division

Strength
2,000 APRA troops	4,500 TNI troops

Casualties and losses
Unknown killed 125 DST soldier captured ~202 deserted	≈100 killed

The APRA coup d’état (Indonesian: Peristiwa Kudeta Angkatan Perang Ratu Adil) or the January 23 coup d’état (Indonesian: Kudeta 23 Januari) was a coup d'état by Raymond Westerling's Legion of the Just Ruler (APRA) to capture Bandung and Jakarta, with the aim to overthrow Sukarno's unitary Republic of Indonesia. Westerling was a demobilised Dutch Captain of the KNIL (Royal Netherlands East Indies Army), who sought to preserve the federal Republic of the United States of Indonesia, which retained the support of the Netherlands and various minority elements. Westerling's forces succeeded in capturing Bandung in the early hours of 23 January 1950.

Simultaneously, the APRA infiltrated Jakarta as part of a coup d’état to overthrow the RUSI Cabinet. Their plan was to arrest and assassinate several prominent Republican figures including the Defence Minister Sultan Hamengkubuwono IX and Secretary-General Ali Budiardjo. However, Westerling's forces in Jakarta were killed or captured by the Indonesian army and police forces. The APRA was forced out of Bandung, while Westerling escaped to Singapore. After a mopping up campaign the Legion of Ratu Adil had ceased to function in February 1950. The coup d'état led to the downfall of Sultan Hamid II and accelerated the integration of the RUSI into the Republic by 17 August 1950.

== Rise of the APRA ==
Prior to the transfer of sovereignty on 27 December 1949, a RUSI Cabinet consisting of both Republican and Federalist members was formed on 17 December 1949. This Cabinet was headed by Prime Minister Mohammad Hatta and included 11 Republicans and five Federalists including the pro-Dutch Sultan Hamid II. Ultimately, this federal government was short-lived due to conflicting differences between the Republicans and the Federalists as well as growing popular support for a unitary state.

Growing tensions between the Republicans and Federalists prompted Hamid II to conspire with the former commander of the DST (Depot Special Forces) commando unit Raymond Westerling to organize an anti-Republican coup d’état which would ensure a federal Republic of the United States of Indonesia. By January 1950, Westerling had built up a militia force known as Legion of the Just Ruler (Angkatan Perang Ratu Adil; APRA) or 'Legion of Ratu Adil'. Raymond Westerling stated that the APRA counted 22,000 men. American historian George Kahin estimates it was about 2,000 men.

The APRA comprised various Republican elements including defectors from the Indonesian army, Islamic and communist battle groups. The Legion was further augmented by elements of the KNIL, Royal Netherlands Army, Westerling's old commando unit and several sympathetic Dutch nationals including two police inspectors. The Republican government attempted to negotiate with Westerling by offering to pay him US$100,000 in exchange for renouncing his revolutionary activities, but Westerling rejected the offer.

== Westerling's Ultimatum ==
On 5 January 1950, Westerling sent an ultimatum to the RIS government of Jakarta. His demands were the recognition of the APRA as the official army of the state of Pasundan and unconditional respect for the autonomy of the federal states. Westerling added that if the answer was not positive within 7 days, he could not be held responsible for the outbreak of large-scale fighting by the APRA. With no reply to his ultimatum, Westerling started the coup in the night of 22–23 January, a month after international recognition of the Republic of Indonesia.

Westerling's ultimatum certainly caused anxiety not only in the RIS, but also on the Dutch side and Dr Hanz M. Hirschfeld (German-born), Nederlandse Hoge Commissaris (Dutch High Commissioner) who had just arrived in Indonesia. The RIS cabinet bombarded Hirschfeld with questions that made him very uncomfortable. The Dutch Minister of Home Affairs, Dirk Stikker, instructed Hirschfeld to take action against all Dutch civil and military officials who were co-operating with Westerling.

On 10 January 1950, Hatta informed Hirschfeld that the Indonesians had issued an arrest order against Westerling. Prior to that, when A.H.J. Lovink was still serving as High Representative of the Crown of the Kingdom of the Netherlands, he had advised Hatta to charge Westerling with Article exorbitante rechten. At that time Westerling visited Sultan Hamid II at the Hotel Des Indes, Jakarta. They had previously met in December 1949. Westerling explained his purpose, and asked Hamid to become the leader of their movement. Hamid wanted to know details about Westerling's organisation. But he did not get a satisfactory answer from Westerling. The meeting that day did not produce any results. After that, the next meeting between Westerling and Hamid is unclear. In his autobiography, Mémoires, published in 1952, Westerling wrote that a Shadow Cabinet had been formed under the leadership of Sultan Hamid II of Pontianak, so he had to keep it a secret.

In mid-January 1950, the Minister of UNI and Provincial Affairs Across the Seas, Mr. J.H. van Maarseveen visited Indonesia to prepare for the Indonesia-Dutch Union meeting to be held in March 1950. Hatta told Maarseven that he had ordered the police to arrest Westerling.

During his visit to the Netherlands, on 20 January 1950, RIS Economic Minister, Djuanda Kartawidjaja, told Minister Lubbertus Götzen that the elite Regiment Speciale Troepen (RST) troops, which were seen as a risk factor, should be evacuated from Indonesia as soon as possible. Prior to this, a unit of RST troops had been evacuated to Ambon and arrived there on 17 January 1950. On 21 January, Hirschfeld informed Götzen that General Buurman van Vreeden and Dutch Defence Minister, Jan Schokking, had been working on a plan for the evacuation of RST troops.

With no reply to his ultimatum, Westerling started the coup in the night of 22–23 January, a month after international recognition of the Republic of Indonesia.

=== Desertion ===
On 22 January at 21.00 Westerling received a report that a number of heavily armed RST troops had deserted and left the military station in Batujajar.

KNIL Major G.H. Christian and KNIL Captain J.H.W. Nix reported that the "Erik" company at Kampemenstraat that night was also going to desert and join the APRA in a coup, but was foiled by its own commander, Captain G.H.O. de Witt. Engles immediately raised the alarm. He contacted Lieutenant Colonel TNI Sadikin, Commander of the Siliwangi Division. Engles also reported the incident to General Buurman van Vreeden in Jakarta.

Between 08.00 and 09.00, he received a visit from RST commander Lieutenant Colonel Borghouts, who was devastated by the desertion of his troops. At 9.00, Engles received a visit from Lt. Col. Sadikin. When a rally of the RST troops at Batujajar took place at noon, 140 men were absent. From the camp in Purabaya it was reported that 190 soldiers had deserted, and from the SOP in Cimahi it was reported that 12 soldiers from Ambon had deserted.

== Attacks against Bandung and Jakarta ==
But the attempt to evacuate the Regiment Speciale Troepen (RST), a combination of red berets and green berets, came too late. From some of his former men, Westerling heard about the plan, and before the deportation of RST troops to the Netherlands began, on 23 January 1950, Westerling launched his coup. Westerling's planned coup d’état involved the near-simultaneous capture of Bandung and Jakarta, followed by the capture of Buitenzorg (modern-day Bogor) where some minor government departments were based. On 22 January, Westerling's troops would infiltrate Bandung on board trucks, disguised as members of the Tentara Nasional Indonesia (TNI). At 10 pm, they would seize ammunition stocks from the old KNIL arms depot in Bandung and then dispatch them to a rendezvous point 15 miles away for delivery to Djakarta by 11 pm. At 5 am on 23 January, APRA forces based in nearby Tjimahi would capture strategic locations like military bases, police stations, and government buildings and communications facilities throughout Bandung and Jakarta. At dawn, about 520 APRA soldiers entered Bandung. However, the Siliwangi Division, which was encamped in the city, had been forewarned of Westerling's plans. KNIL Lieutenant Colonel T. Cassa had telephoned General Engles and reported: "A strong APRA force is moving along Jalan Pos Besar towards Bandung." A motorized unit was sent to intercept the Legion, but was quickly defeated. Advancing through Bandung, the APRA captured key locations including the TNI's headquarters and the Siliwangi barracks. Within an hour, they had secured the city center and eliminated all resistance. TNI Lieutenant Colonel Adolf Lembong and 93 other Indonesian soldiers and officers were killed. The majority of the TNI forces were taken by surprise and there were reports of soldiers discarding their uniforms and fleeing. TNI Colonel Erie Sudeweo sought refuge in the Dutch barracks.

However, the second phase of the coup d'état collapsed since the majority of the KNIL's commanders cooperated with the Indonesian government and refused to support Westerling's actions. A Dutch officer discovered the unloading of ammunition from the Bandung arms depot into trucks of the APRA. Due to this development, the ammunitions convoy did not arrive in the Republican capital Jakarta at 11 PM as planned. Westerling's Legion was unable to launch its scheduled attack at 5 AM on 23 January. There had been plans to seize the presidential palace, army barracks and to arrest Republican politicians including Sukarno, Hatta, Hamengkubuwono IX and Ali Budiardjo. Unable to find any ammunition, Westerling was forced to abort his attack by 6 AM. With the coup attempt in tatters, the APRA retreated from Bandung after negotiations with KNIL Major General Edu Engles. By 5 PM Republican forces under Sadikin had re-established control over Bandung.

== Aftermath of the coup ==
Following Bandung, most APRA units returned to their respective compounds. In the following weeks several small APRA units were defeated in a mopping up campaign by the Indonesian army and police. The Legion of the Just Ruler had ceased to function in February 1950. The attempted coup d'état increased public agitation for the dissolution of the federal system. Westerling himself left for Jakarta, and on 24 January 1950 met again with Sultan Hamid II at the Hotel Des Indes. Hamid, accompanied by his secretary, Dr J. Kiers, criticised Westerling for his failure and blamed Westerling for making a big mistake in Bandung. There was no debate, and shortly afterwards Westerling left the hotel. Westerling escaped with the help of the Dutch government to Singapore. Despite attempts by the Indonesian government to extradite him, he lived in exile in the Netherlands until his death in 1987.

By April 5, several key conspirators including Sultan Hamid II had been arrested by the Republican authorities. On April 19, Hamid II confessed to his involvement in the botched Jakarta coup and to planning a second attack on Parliament scheduled for February 15. Due to the presence of RUSI troops, the attack had been aborted. The role of the Pasundan government in the coup led to its dissolution by February 10, further undermining the federal structure. By then, the Pasundan Parliament's wishes of merger with the republic were fulfilled. By late March 1950, Hamid's West Kalimantan was one of the four remaining federal states in the United States of Indonesia.

Hamid's role in the coup led to increased agitation in West Kalimantan for its integration as part of the Republic of Indonesia. Following a fact-finding mission by the Government Commission, the RUSI House of Representatives voted, by a margin of fifty votes to one, to merge West Kalimantan into the Republic of Indonesia. Following clashes with demobilized KNIL troops under Andi Aziz in Makassar and the attempted secession of an Ambonese Republic of South Moluccas, the federal United States of Indonesia was dissolved on 17 August 1950, turning Indonesia into a unitary state dominated by the central government in Jakarta.

Roughly 125 men from the Special Troops Regiment were handed over to the Dutch troops still remaining on Java. A Dutch court-martial sentenced them to prison terms ranging from six to twelve months. All were transferred to Dutch New Guinea to serve their sentences there. After serving out their terms, the former APRA soldiers went sent back to the Netherlands.
