= Adolf Gustaaf Lembong =

Indonesian military officer (1910–1950)

Adolf Lembong
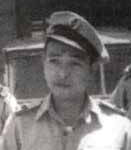
- Adolf Lembong in 1950
- Born: 19 October 1910; Ongkaw, North Sulawesi, Dutch East Indies
- Died: 23 January 1950 (aged 39); Bandung, West Java, Indonesia
- Military career
- Allegiance: Indonesia
- Branch: Indonesian Army
- Rank: First Lieutenant (USAFFE LGAF); First Lieutenant (KNIL); Lieutenant Colonel (TNI)
- Conflicts: Indonesian National Revolution: Operation Product; Operation Kraai

Adolf Gustaaf Lembong (19 October 1910 – 23 January 1950) was an Indonesian military officer involved in guerrilla warfare against Japan in the Philippines during World War II and subsequently in the struggle for Indonesian independence. He was killed during the APRA coup d'état in Bandung.

== World War II ==
At the start of World War II, Lembong was an NCO in the Dutch colonial army (KNIL) in Manado. In 1943, he was captured by the Japanese and sent to Japanese POW Camp in Luzon, Philippines. Lembong and several others were able to escape captivity and join a local guerrilla unit that was part of the USAFFE LGAF. It was during his prison time that he learned basic and some advanced Tagalog and English from his fellow American and Filipino prisoners.

== Struggle for Indonesian independence ==
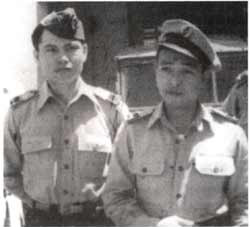
Lt. Col. Joop Warouw and Lt. Col. Lembong in Jakarta on 18 January 1950

After the war, Lembong returned to Indonesia as KNIL officer in January 1946 and later joined an irregular armed organization called the "Loyalty of the Indonesian People from Sulawesi" (Indonesian: Kebaktian Rakjat Indonesia Sulawesi (KRIS)) after Operation Product on 21 July 1947. This group was mostly made up of men from the Minahasa region in North Sulawesi who were residing in Java. In 1947, KRIS and other groups were integrated into the Armed Forces of the Republic of Indonesia (Indonesian: Tentara Republik Indonesia (TRI)). In 1948, TRI became the National Armed Forces of Indonesia (Indonesian: Tentara Nasional Indonesia (TNI)) and Lembong became commandant of 16th Brigade (Brigade XVI) with the rank of lieutenant colonel. During Operation Kraai, Lembong was captured in Yogyakarta and jailed by the Dutch for a time in Ambawara.

== APRA Coup d'etat and death ==
Lembong was initially considered for the Military Attaché position in the Philippines, but was instead appointed head of the Army Education Department. He traveled to Bandung to take up his position. On 23 January, he planned to visit the commandant of the Siliwangi Division, but was unaware that APRA forces led by Captain Raymond Westerling had attacked the division headquarters. Lembong was brutally killed by APRA soldiers. The place where Lembong was killed is now a museum associated with the Siliwangi Division. The street where this museum is located is now called Lembong.
