= Raymond Westerling =

Dutch military commander (1919–1987)

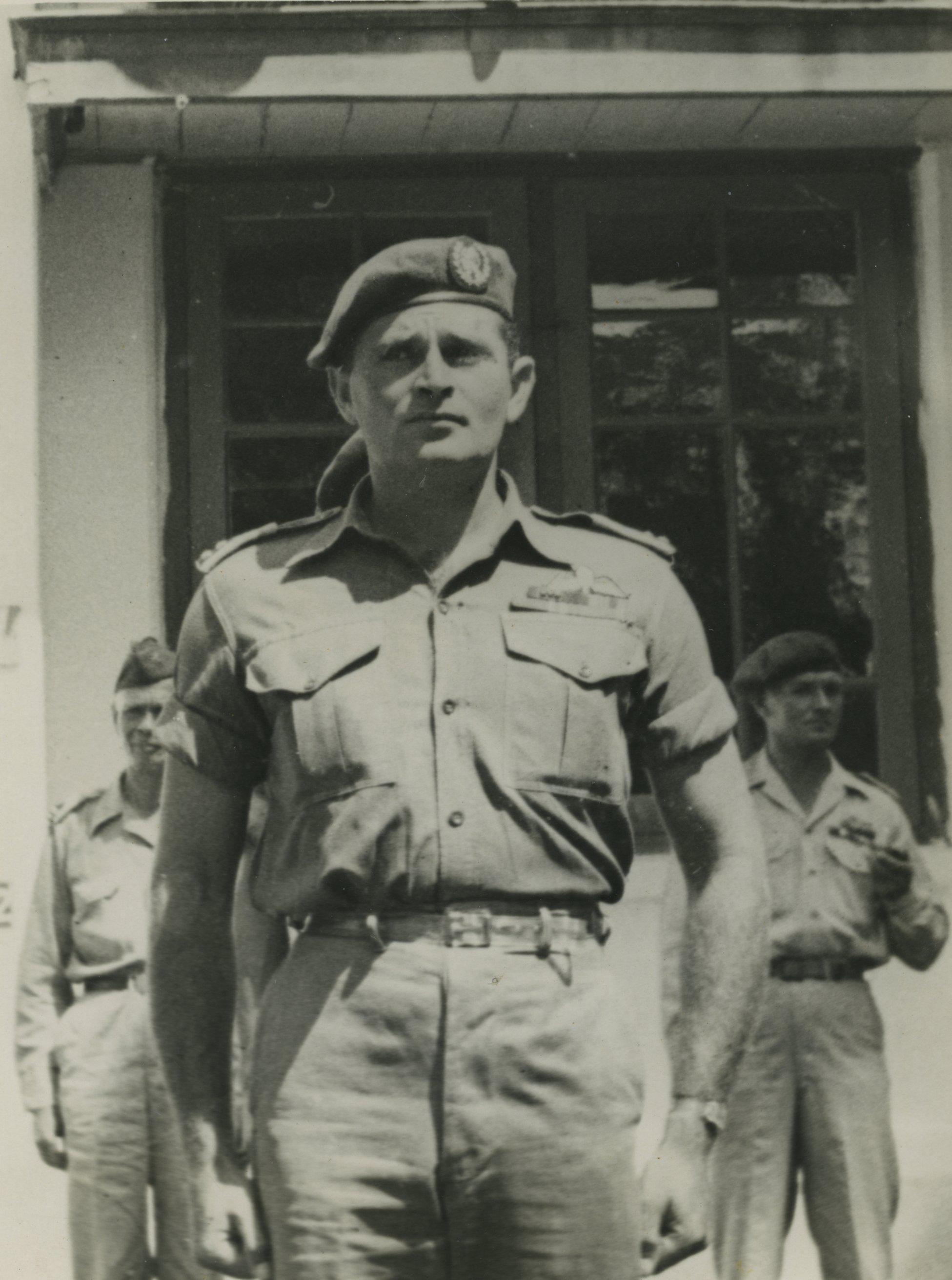
- Westerling in 1948
- Born: Raymond Pierre Paul Westerling; 31 August 1919; Pera, Istanbul, Ottoman Empire (present-day Turkey)
- Died: 26 November 1987 (aged 68); Purmerend, Netherlands
- Burial place: De Nieuwe Ooster Cemetery, Amsterdam; 52°20′45″N 04°56′21″E
- Military career
- Service years: 1941–1950
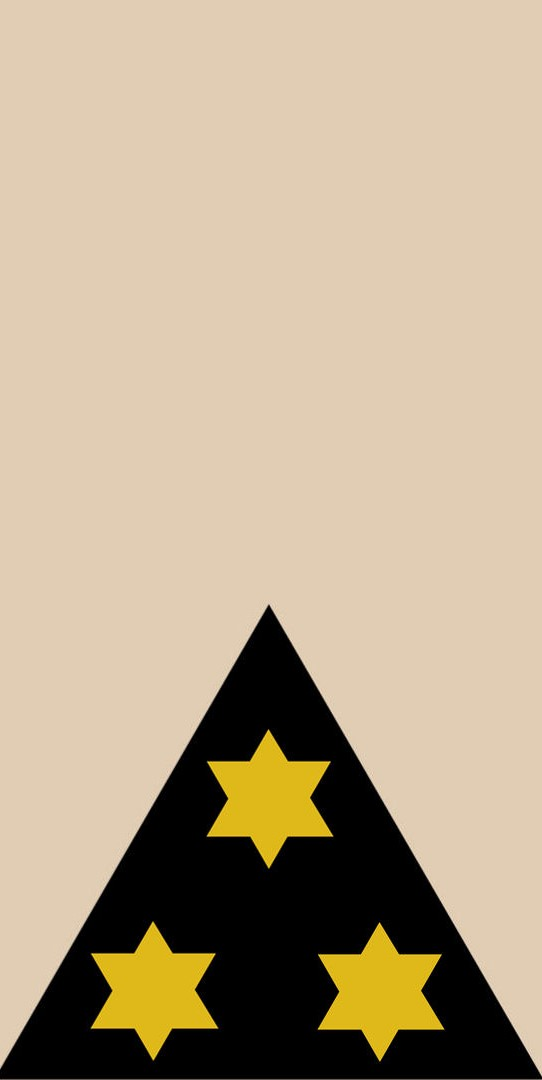
- Rank: Captain
- Nickname: The Turk
- Commands: Korps Speciale Troepen; Legion of the Just Ruler
- Conflict(s): Indonesian National Revolution; South Sulawesi campaign; APRA coup d'état attempt

Raymond Pierre Paul Westerling (31 August 1919 – 26 November 1987) was a Dutch military officer of the Royal Netherlands East Indies Army. He orchestrated a counter-guerrilla operation in Sulawesi during the Indonesian National Revolution after World War II and participated in a coup attempt against the Government of Indonesia in January 1950, a month after the official transfer of sovereignty. Both actions were denounced as war crimes by the Indonesian authorities. Born in the Ottoman Empire, despite his nickname, The Turk, Westerling was of mixed Dutch and Greek descent.

== Early life ==
Raymond "The Turk" Westerling was born on 31 August 1919 in Istanbul. He was the second son of a Greek mother, Sophia Moutzou, and a Dutch dealer in antiques, Paul Westerling, whose family had lived there for three generations. He grew up speaking Greek, Turkish, French and English, and later wrote: "One of the few Western European languages that I didn't speak a word of was my mother tongue: Dutch." When World War II engulfed Europe in 1941, he went to the Dutch consulate in Istanbul and enlisted in the Royal Netherlands Army, much to his father's dismay.

== Military career ==
=== World War II ===
At the age of 22, in 1941, Westerling reported to the Dutch consulate in Istanbul as a volunteer for the Allies. He made his way to England, where he was conscripted into the Princess Irene Brigade in Wolverhampton, but was unhappy with garrison life. Westerling was among the first 48 Dutch soldiers to receive special training at the Commando Basic Training Centre in Achnacarry, on the barren, cold and uninhabited Scottish coast. He completed this training under William E. Fairbairn in July 1942. After his promotion to corporal, Westerling became the instructor for "Unarmed Combat" and "Silent Killing", in No. 2 Dutch Troop, No. 10 (Inter-Allied) Commando. Within a year, he was teaching these skills to 10 Commando as a whole, and was also instructing in "Toughness Training". At his own request, he left this staff position and, in December 1943, he rejoined No. 2 Dutch Troop in India. In Ceylon, he underwent jungle training.

In 1944, he was appointed sergeant for special services and was placed at the disposal of the Office of Special Assignments (BBO), an organization that trained agents for covert actions in the occupied Netherlands. To his disappointment, Westerling was never sent to the front line. Instead, he was appointed sergeant major instructor of the Binnenlandse Strijdkrachten in the liberated southern Netherlands. On 10 March 1945 Westerling was seriously injured by a German attack with a V-1 Rocket. He was then taken to London. After healing, he was promoted to lieutenant by the head of BBO, General Van Oorschot, and sent to the Korps Insulinde on Malacca. From that corps he was deployed to Medan (Sumatra) to act together with the British against Indonesian insurgents in and around Medan.

=== Indonesian National Revolution ===
==== North Sumatra ====
Westerling first came to Indonesia in September 1945, landing in Medan, North Sumatra, as an officer of the KNIL. Conditions there, as in much of Indonesia, were tense and chaotic after the end of the Japanese occupation. Since the end of World War II, parts of the Indonesian people were in an armed and diplomatic struggle against the Dutch for independence. To restore Dutch control in Medan, Westerling set up an intelligence network and a police force. Formally, Westerling was under British command, but he mostly went his own way. Within a few months, he was notable for his sense of intelligence, which laid the foundations for some important successes for the British forces. He had built a reputation for decisive and heavy-handed action where necessary by successfully rooting out enemies classified as rogue elements by the Dutch, which those most involved legitimized by referring to the brutal methods of the opposing side. This included methods such as his elimination of a gang leader who went by the name of Terakan and who was said to be responsible for attacks against European and Indonesian civilians in North Sumatra. In his memoirs he described his action as follows: "We planted a stake in the middle of the village and on it we impaled the head of Terakan. Beneath it we nailed a polite warning to the members of his band that if they persisted in their evildoing, their heads would join his own."

==== Southern Sulawesi ====
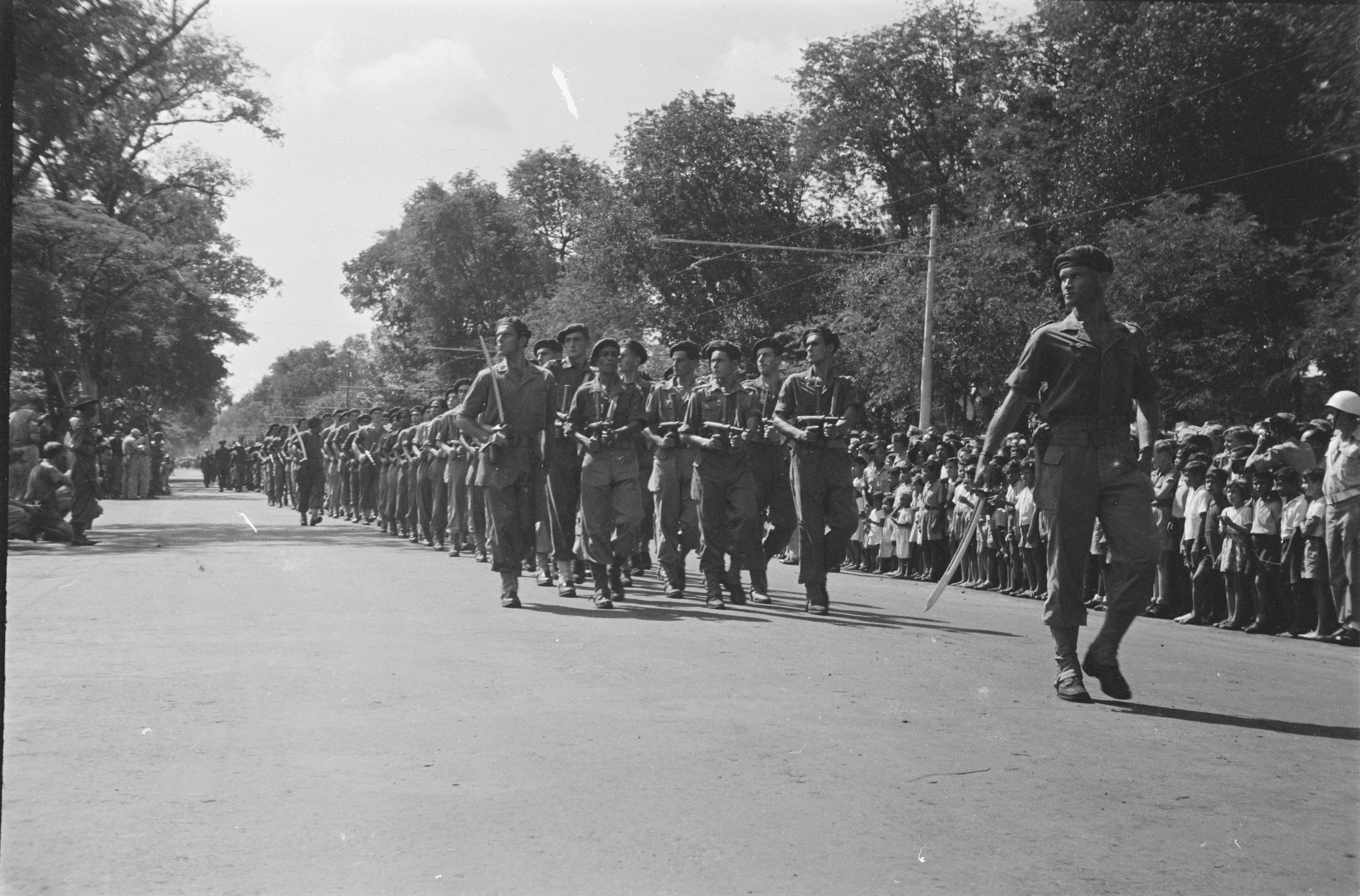
DST Troops parading through Batavia for Princess Juliana's birthday in 1947. Leading the way is Captain Raymond Westerling

In July 1946, having completed his first assignment as a first lieutenant, Westerling took over the Depot Special Forces (DST) commando unit. Westerling's training of his unit was primarily based on his experiences with the British commandos. In September 1946, the DST, stationed at Batavia (modern-day Jakarta), numbered about 130 soldiers, a mix of Dutch war volunteers, and Indonesians. In December 1946, he received the instruction to eliminate the insurgency and to restore Dutch control in Sulawesi. That island - like other parts of the Dutch East Indies - was in the grip of a violent uprising that was characterised by the Dutch government and in the media as 'red-white terror'. Government authority had all but collapsed, economic life was paralysed, while people in doubt were pressurised to turn away from colonial authority. Guerilla fighters from Java had joined the local groups, and government officials and members of the pro-Dutch Eurasian and Indo-Chinese community were attacked and killed. The KNIL garrisons, stationed on the island, were not able to provide protection. Criminal gangs had free rein. This period of disorder entered the history books as the Bersiap era. All this thwarted the Dutch plan to prepare the state of eastern Indonesia for independence. Though according to the Enthoven Commission (1948), there was no organised rebellion against Dutch authority at the time.

After intensive consultations between the political leadership in Batavia and the Dutch army command, it was decided to deploy an extra battalion of troops and the DST led by Raymond Westerling. He was given a clear mandate and instructions to organise a counterguerrilla operation against the 'red-white terror'. Part of the mandate Westerling received from Colonel Henk de Vries, the operational commander on South Celebes, was the authority to exercise summary execution. In doing so, he was accountable to the operational commander on site and to the Allied Command Officer (CDO) Major General Eduard Engles.

Westerling claimed that "pacifying" Southern Celebes without losing thousands of innocent lives could only be accomplished by instituting summary execution, on the spot, for suspected enemy fighters, who were generally executed. This became known as part of the "Westerling Method". Based on information received from his own informants or the Dutch military intelligence service, the members of the DST surrounded one or more suspected villages during night, after which they drove the population to a central location. At daybreak, the operation began, often led by Westerling. Men would be separated from women and children. From information obtained through spying and the local people, Westerling deemed certain people as terrorists and murderers. Based on this information they were shot. Persons who offered armed resistance were immediately killed. Afterwards, Westerling would install a new village leader and set up a village police force. All present would have to swear on the Koran that they would not follow in the path of the "terrorists". Finally, Westerling organised a new police force and appointed kampong boards that were made responsible for maintaining order. In 1954, the Van Rij/Stam committee characterised Westerling's actions as a "solemn" method, which would have made a deep impression on the population (Conclusion VI). Dutch historian Lou de Jong commented in his publication on Westerling's action: "There may have been guilty ones among those indicated as having aided the T.R.I.S. or other resistance groups, but surely there were innocent ones among them. Besides that: there was no judicial basis for these summary judicial bloodbaths – even in a state of war they did not exist." In the recent publication of Geersing, he claimed that the actions of Westerling were in conformity with the existing and applicable legal and military principles and regulations in those days.

The counter-insurgency operation started in December 1946 and ended in February 1947. According to Indonesian accounts, all this came at the cost of large numbers of casualties. In his book De Zuid-Celebes Affaire: Kapitein Westerling en de standrechtelijke executies, Dutch revisionist historian Willem IJzereef claims that the actions of the DST cost about 1,500 Indonesian lives. About 400 of them were executed during actions led by Westerling himself, while the remaining 1,100 were killed during actions of his second in command. The responsibility for these executions was this second in command, as was stated by the Enthoven investigational committee (1948). Another 1,500 deaths could be added as a result of actions of other KNIL units. Approximately 900 Indonesians were killed by pro-Dutch police units and members of the village police. IJzereef believes that Indonesian resistance caused around 1,500 victims. In the report of the Enthoven Committee (1948) the 'red and white terror' is also held responsible for 2,661 cases of rampok (robbery) and 555 cases of arson.

The violent period prior to Westerling's crackdown saw 1,200 Indonesian casualties in South Celebes from rival gangs, crime and political terror under the Republican banner. This, according to Westerling's sympathisers, justified the crackdown. This reading is endorsed by Mr B.J. Lambers, then the attorney-general's representative on South Celebes. Historians Rémy Limpach ("De brandende kampongs van generaal Spoor", 2016) and Gert Oostindie ("Soldaat in Indonesië", 2016) also give the impression that Westerling's actions, if not directly ordered from on high, were at least condoned by the military and political authorities in Batavia. Bauke Geersing, in his 2019 study Captain Raymond Westerling and the South Celebes Affair, argues that Westerling's actions in South Celebes were the result of deliberate decisions taken by the military and political top brass in the Dutch East Indies. Through the General Commission, the representation of the Dutch government in the Dutch East Indies, the entire Cabinet was ultimately responsible for this. Even the top of the judiciary, in the person of Attorney General H.J. Felderhof, endorsed that military action was necessary and warranted by emergency law. Geersing therefore concludes that Westerling's action was in line with the political and social morals of the time and the legal and military frameworks in place at the time.

Westerling's actions temporarily restored Dutch control in Southern Celebes. Until the end of 1949 the situation there was relatively quiet and under control. However, the Netherlands East Indies government and the Dutch army command soon realised that Westerling's actions led to growing public criticism. There was an official inquiry by the Dutch government in April 1947 and Raymond Westerling's actions were justified by this committee. In 1948 he decided to leave the army. He was relieved of his duties in November 1948.

Former United States Secretary of State and Secretary of Defense General George C. Marshall once called Westerling "Satan" and "Devil" due to the atrocities committed under his command during the Indonesian National Revolution, especially during the Sulawesi campaign, which caused Marshall to cut all Marshall Plan aid to the Netherlands and push for the United States to recognize Indonesian sovereignty and for the Netherlands to withdraw.

The aftermath of the South Celebes affair has left deep marks, both in Indonesia and the Netherlands. On 12 September 2013, the Dutch government, through its ambassador in Jakarta, Tjeerd de Zwaan, apologised to all victims of the massacre. Ten widows who were still alive received compensation.

=== Departure ===
The Dutch army command did not consider Westerling suitable for the task of commander of a newly formed military unit due to the ongoing negative publicity about his performance in South Celebes and criticism of the violent actions of the DST. The DST then consisted of about 1,200 men. General Simon Spoor toyed with the idea of carrying out an airborne landing in the Javanese province of Yokyakarta (Djokja) during the Second Police Action. Lieutenant Colonel van Beek had been commissioned to carry out a special staff study in order to merge the First Para Company with the Special Forces Corps and, at the same time, carry out a selection for quality among its cadre and men. General Spoor had some special assignments in mind for Westerling. However, based on this new approach and because of the negative publicity surrounding Westerling and the 'old' KST, the army command decided to appoint another commander for the newly formed military unit. On 16 November 1948, Westerling handed over the command of his unit to Lieutenant Colonel W.C.A. van Beek, who was tasked with transforming the Special Forces into a unit suitable for airborne operations in Djokja.

Although Westerling was nominated for an award several times, he was not awarded one. In August 1948, in an open letter to Prince Bernhard, his then adjutant Henk Ulrici drew attention to the fact that Westerling had still not received an award, even though he was a "rare brave, sturdy and clever commander". Bernhard inquired from General Spoor the same month whether or not Westerling would be awarded a decoration. Spoor informed the prince that he would make efforts to obtain an award. However, there was no feeling for this in The Hague. When Westerling's departure from the Special Forces was already certain, Colonel Reemer made one last attempt. He proposed to give Westerling a Military Order of William for his work in Sumatra, Celebes and Java. Reemer's request was also rejected. In the end, Westerling received only a special certificate of satisfaction at his demobilisation on 14 January 1949.

== Attempted coup ==
Raymond Westerling settled down in western Java, married and started a transportation company in the Puncak Pass area. Here he put together an armed movement from groups opposed to the impending transfer of official power from the Dutch to the Indonesian Republic with the aim of preserving the autonomy of the Dutch-created state of Pasundan in western Java. Westerling named his movement the Legion of the Just Ruler (APRA) from the Javanese myth that a messianic figure would come to save the people of Java and establish universal peace and justice.

Supporters were recruited from several social, cultural, and political groups. Even with the name, most were Sundanese who wanted an independent Pasundan not ruled by Javanese, defectors from the Indonesian Republican Army, soldiers of the DST and other KNIL units, who opposed the creation of the Indonesian republic. Raymond Westerling claimed that the APRA counted 22,000 men. However, Dutch historian Jaap de Moor says that such an extensive organization only existed in the fantasy of Westerling. He stated that APRA hardly had any size and Westerling was hoping for help from soldiers of the KNIL and in particular the Regiment Speciale Troepen (the successor to the DST/KST), of which he had been commander. These Special Forces soldiers would still have had Westerling on their hands. There are strong indications that senior Indonesian officials, and top Dutch military officers were also involved in the coup. For instance, it is certain that Sultan Syarif Hamid II of Pontianak, minister in Sukarno's cabinet at the time, played an active role in it. The sultan was a former KNIL colonel, former adjutant of the queen and a friend of Prince Bernhard. He favoured a federal form of state, different from the unitary state Sukarno pursued. Because of his involvement in the coup, he was later convicted. Consequently, supporters of Westerling call it a myth that this so-called 'Bandung coup' was solely the work of the ousted commander and his faithful. Rather, Westerling served as a forward post. On 5 January 1950, Westerling sent an ultimatum to the government of Jakarta. His demands were the recognition of the APRA as the official army of the state of Pasundan and unconditional respect for the autonomy of the federal states. Westerling added that if the answer was not positive, he could not be held responsible for the outbreak of large-scale fighting by the APRA.

With no reply to his ultimatum, Westerling started the coup in the night of 22–23 January, a month after international recognition of the Republic of Indonesia. His plan was to attack Bandung and Jakarta at the same time, concentrating on garrisons, police stations, media centres and other key positions. The APRA would raid and eliminate the Hatta cabinet during one of its government meetings. An interim-federal government, presided over by Sultan Syarif Hamid II, would take control. Despite their numerical inferiority to the Siliwangi Division, Westerling's men captured Bandung. However, they failed to take over Jakarta. Law and order were quickly restored by the Republican army and the Indonesian police force. In spite of the coup's relative brevity, it claimed dozens of lives on both sides. The captured APRA soldiers, including some 125 from the Special Troops Regiment, were handed over to the Dutch troops still remaining on Java. A Dutch court-martial sentenced them to prison terms ranging from six to twelve months. Lieutenant PED Titaley, who had acted as a liaison with Westerling, received a sentence of one year and eight months. All were transferred to Dutch New Guinea to serve their sentences there. After their imprisonment (1951-'52) many former APRA soldiers went directly from New Guinea to the Netherlands. While the Dutch government had officially condemned the coup, they helped smuggle Westerling out of Indonesia to Singapore.

== Dutch conspiracy in Westerling's escape ==
=== Flight from Tanjung Priok ===
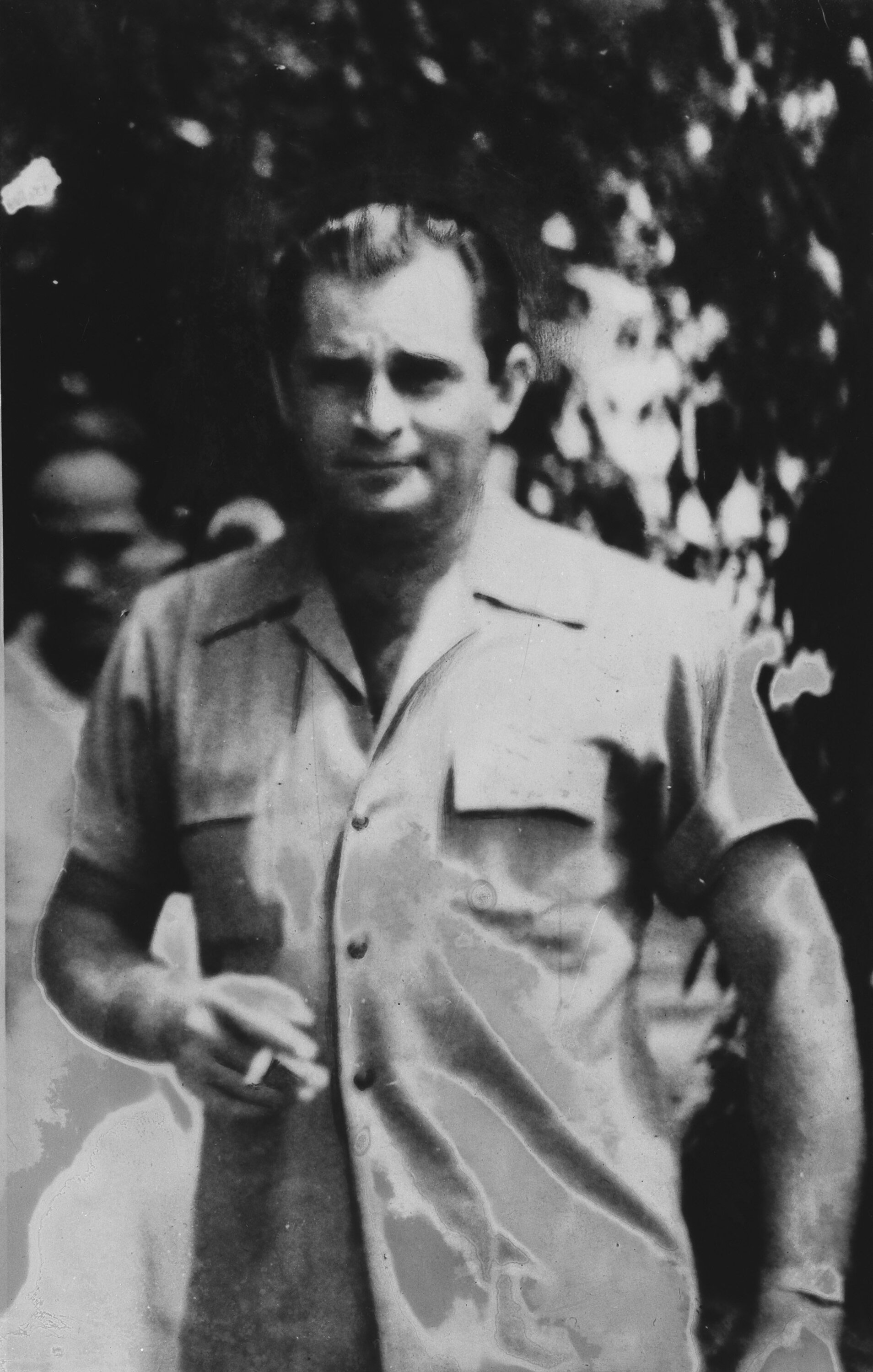
Westerling in hiding, days after the attempted coup (10 February 1950)

Since the failure of 23 January, Westerling had been in hiding in Jakarta, where he brought his wife and children. He moved from place to place, among others at Kebon Sirih 62A, with the De Nijs family.

On 8 February 1950 Westerling's wife met Major General van Langen, who was Chief of Staff, at his residence. Westerling's wife told van Langen about the situation her husband was facing. That same day van Langen contacted General Dirk Cornelis Buurman van Vreeden, Hirschfeld and W.H. Andreae Fockema, State Secretary of the Dutch Cabinet who was also in Jakarta. The subject of the conversation was the rescue of Westerling, who in the eyes of many Dutch people was a hero. It was considered, among other things, to bring Westerling to western Papua. But the day after, on 9 February, Hatta stated that if the Dutch managed to capture Westerling, the Republic would demand that Westerling be handed over to the Indonesians. Hirschfeld recognised that they could not help Westerling as this would bring shame to the Dutch government. Therefore, he told the Dutch military leadership to abandon the plan to rescue Westerling.

However, unbeknownst to Hirschfeld, on 10 February Major General van Langen ordered the Chief of Intelligence of the General Staff, Major F. van der Veen to contact Westerling and make arrangements for his escape from Indonesia. With the help of Lieutenant Colonel Johannes Borghouts - Westerling's successor as commander of the elite KST troops - on 16 February at the officers' mess where KL Adjutant H.J. van Bessem lived at Kebon Sirih 66 a meeting took place with Westerling, where Westerling was then hiding. Borghouts reported the meeting to KNIL Lieutenant Colonel Pereira, an officer on the General Staff, who then forwarded the results of this meeting to MayJend. van Langen.

Westerling moved to another hiding place and stayed for a few days at the place of KNIL Sergeant Major L.A. Savalle, who then reported to van der Veen. Van der Veen himself then reported to General van Langen and General Buurman van Vreeden, Commander-in-Chief of the Dutch Army. Van Vreeden himself relayed these developments to Secretary of State Andreae Fockema. Thus, with the exception of Hirschfeld, the Dutch High Commissioner, all of the highest Dutch ranks in Jakarta, both military and civilian, were aware of and involved in the conspiracy to hide Westerling and his escape from Indonesia. Andreae Fockema stated that he would take over all responsibility.

On 17 February Lieutenant Colonel Borghouts and Major van der Veen were tasked with drawing up an evacuation plan. A plan was drawn up to take Westerling out of Indonesia on a Catalina aircraft belonging to the "Marineluchtvaartdienst - MLD" (Naval Aviation Service) under the authority of Vice Admiral J.W. Kist. This plan was approved by Van Langen and the same day Westerling was informed of this plan. Van der Veen discussed further details with Van Langen regarding the need for money, rubber boats and fake passports. On 18 February van Langen conveyed this to General van Vreeden. Van der Veen contacted Captain (Sea) P. Vroon, Chief of the MLD and relayed the plan. Vroon informed Admiral Kist that there was a request from the KNIL to use Catalina for a special task. Kist gave his approval, although at the time he was not informed of the actual use. General van Langen, in his letter to Admiral Kist, only explained that one Catalina aircraft was needed for the visit of a high-ranking officer to the Riau Islands, and not a word about Westerling. Subsequently, a false passport was made at the High Commissioner's office (without an official report). The name on the passport was Willem Ruitenbeek, born in Manila.

On Wednesday 22 February, one month after the failed "coup", Westerling, wearing the uniform of a KNIL sergeant, was picked up by van der Veen and taken by car to the MLD base at Tanjung Priok Port. The Catalina aircraft only made a stopover in Tanjungpinang and then continued its flight to Singapore. They arrived in Singapore waters late in the evening. Approximately one kilometre from the coast of Singapore the plane landed in the sea and the rubber boat was lowered.

In his book De Eenling, Westerling explained that his rubber boat was leaking and taking on water. Luckily he was rescued by a Chinese fishing boat that took him to Singapore. On arrival in Singapore, he immediately contacted his Chinese friend Chia Piet Kay, who had helped when buying weapons for the Pao An Tui. He immediately made plans to return to Indonesia.

=== Arrival and detention at Singapore ===
After arriving to port, Westerling had been staying at Chia Piet Kay house in the centre of Singapore. After a visit by special branch officer A.R. McEwan, it was found that Westerling had entered the colony without the correct papers, mainly the false passport. Alerted by this, McEwan followed by arresting Westerling without any resistance. He was then incarcerated in Changi Prison having to enter the territory illegally. Westerling explained to the Singaporean authorities, that he had come to Malaya in an attempt to garner financial support and arms for his organization in Indonesia. Previously, on February 20 when Westerling was still in Jakarta, Hugh Laming, a journalist from Reuters, sent a telegram to London and reported that Westerling was on his way to Singapore, to then continue on to Europe.

After hearing that Westerling had been arrested by the British Police in Singapore, the RIS Government submitted a request to the authorities in Singapore via the British Embassy in Jakarta concerning the extradition of Westerling "on the grounds of crimes perpetrated by him in Indonesia". With this communiqué, the authorities had intended to momentarily hold Westerling in a detention camp on Saint John's Island, off the coast of Singapore. Previously, a Dutch cabinet meeting on August 7 had decided that upon his arrival in the Netherlands, Westerling would be immediately detained, though it was uncertain for the situation of Westerling in Singapore. Thus, on 15 August 1950, at the High Court hearing in Singapore, Judge Evans ruled that Westerling as a Dutch citizen could not be extradited to Indonesia and that the newly formed Republic of Indonesia had no extradition treaty with the British.

The coverage in the mass media deeply hit and humiliated the Dutch civil and military leadership in Indonesia. The RIS Cabinet flooded the Dutch High Commissioner Hirschfeld with questions. Hirschfeld himself did not believe in the mass media at first, while Jend. Buurman van Vreeden and Gen. van Langen denied that they knew about the Dutch military leadership's assistance to Westerling in escaping to Singapore.

On February 25, Hirschfeld realized that all the reports were true and it turned out that he and Admiral Kist were the only ones who were not informed by van Vreeden, van Langen, and Fockema about the existence of a Dutch conspiracy to save Westerling from being arrested by the Indonesians. Following his word, Fockema immediately took the blame and stated that he was responsible and informed the Government of the United States of Indonesia that Hirschfeld had absolutely no knowledge of this matter. According to Moor's indications, since the scandal which was very embarrassing to the Dutch Government was uncovered, the relationship between Hirschfeld and the top Dutch military leadership in Indonesia has reached the lowest point.

On 21 August, Westerling left Singapore as a free man aboard the Australian Qantas aircraft and was accompanied by the Dutch Consul General to Singapore, R. van der Gaag, a Westerling supporter.

=== Landing in Belgium ===
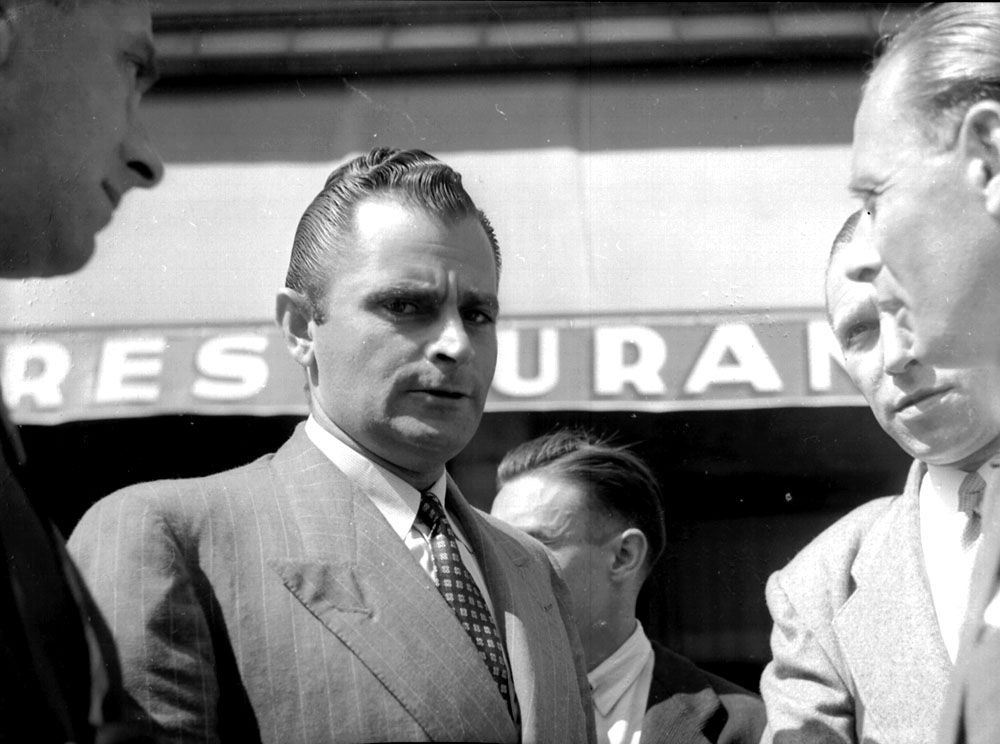
Raymond Westerling In Brussels, Belgium

After a brief stop to Tangiers and then Paris, It turned out that Westerling himself was not immediately taken to the Netherlands, but – with van der Gaag's permission – he got off in Brussels, Belgium. He was soon visited by representatives of the Ambonese from The Hague, who founded the "Stichting Door de Eeuwen Trouw - DDET " (Foundation of Perpetual Faithfulness). They planned to return to Maluku to stir up rebellion there. In the Netherlands itself, Westerling in absentia became a most respected person.

Early April 1952, Westerling secretly entered the Netherlands. His whereabouts could not be hidden and were soon discovered, and on 16 April, Westerling was arrested at the home of Graaf A.S.H. van Rechteren. Hearing the news of Westerling's arrest in the Netherlands, on 12 May 1952 the Indonesian High Commissioner in the Netherlands Susanto requested that Westerling be extradited to Indonesia, but was refused by the Dutch government. Even the day after the extradition request, on 13 May, Westerling was released from custody. The decision of the Dutch Supreme Court on 31 October 1952 stated that Westerling was a Dutch citizen and therefore would not be extradited to Indonesia.

== Life in the Netherlands ==
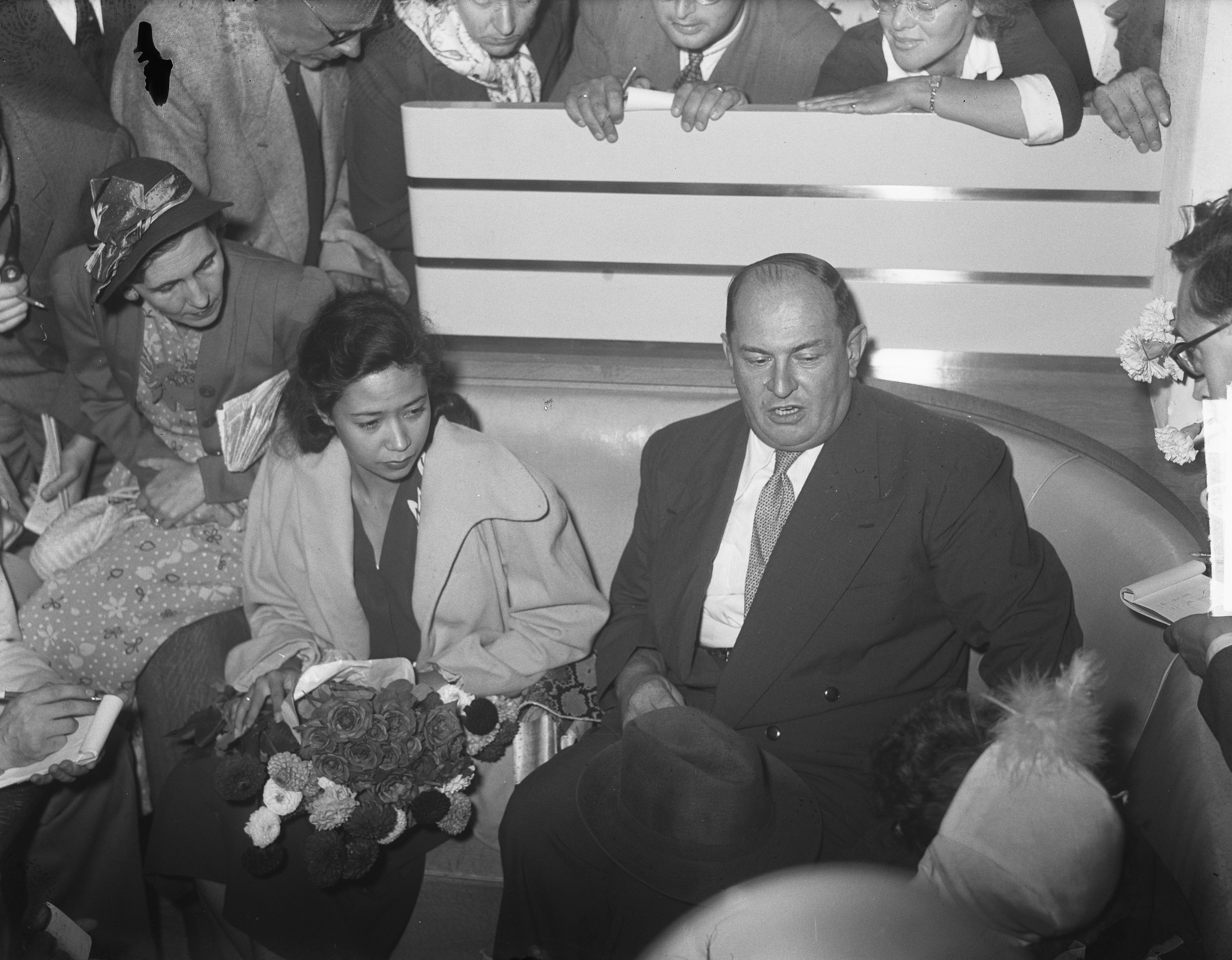
Yvonne Fournier and John Thiessen flocked by journalists after landing at Schiphol Airport

After protracted wanderings, with constant threats of extradition to Indonesia, Westerling eventually arrived in the Netherlands and published his memoirs. In 1952, he published his book Challenge to Terror. The book served as his memoirs while also defending his actions and military tactics, including the "Westerling Method." He framed his actions as being necessary, disciplined, and effective, claiming they restored order and saved lives in the long run. He ultimately denies accusations of indiscriminate massacres, portraying himself instead as a professional soldier facing impossible circumstances.

With the help of John Thiessen, in preventing his extradition to Indonesia and the escorting of his Indonesian-French wife, Yvonne Fournier, Westerling settled down in a small town in the province of Friesland. After his release from detention, Westerling was often asked to speak at meetings, which were often packed with his devotees. At one meeting, he was asked why Sukarno had not been shot. Westerling replied,

The Dutch are very calculating, a bullet costs 35 cents, Soekarno costs less than 5 cents, meaning an unaccountable loss of 30 cents.

A few days later, the Indonesian High Commissioner protested to the Dutch cabinet against the insult.

In 1953, he founded the S.O.S. Foundation (Steunt Ontredderde Staten) in Sneek, which called for extra-parliamentary actions to force compliance with the peace agreement reached at the Round Table Conference (1949). In 1955, he co-founded the Dutch Conservative Party (renamed to Dutch Opposition Union), a continuation of the banned Nazi party National European Social Movement. The new grouping - an amalgamation of far-right politicians, adventurers and handy businessmen - made headlines for plans for armed action against Indonesia.

With financial support from ex-NSB member Jan Wolthuis and Groningen businessman and former Sicherheitspolizei and SD officer Pieter Gaillard, the armoured yacht Evipan was purchased to sail to Ambon. The ship proved unseaworthy, after which they purchased the Schnellboot Seeadler in Wilhelmshaven, which, however, was detained by the Dutch government. Another try was made with the Evipan, but it was seized on the Ems river and Westerling had to surrender his passport. The Dutch government refused any support to the movement, after which a protest rally in November 1955 openly threatened a coup of the Dutch government if they would not cooperate. "We have sufficiently filled arms depots," a spokesman for the former underground stated. In the process, Westerling was outlined as the ideal leader for the intended armed struggle in the Moluccas. Westerling, reportedly still on his way to Ambon, subsequently distanced himself from the new party, after which his comrades brought him before an 'honour council' on suspicion of embezzlement. However, he denied all allegations and the public tribunal was cancelled for unclear reasons.

In December 1956, Westerling's confidant Ton Schilling (1919-1984), a freelance journalist and founder of the Veterans Legion of the Netherlands, was arrested by the state police. Schilling was sentenced to one year in prison for swindling and embezzling substantial sums of money collected for sabotage operations in Indonesia, while Westerling was acquitted of involvement. Schilling still belonged to the close circle around Westerling in 1969. Meanwhile, the Indonesian Foreign Ministry issued a 'White Paper' in early 1957, stating that investigations into far-right networks supporting the armed uprisings in the Moluccas had been ongoing since the early 1950s. Dutch government circles were also allegedly involved in the plotting, according to the Indonesians.

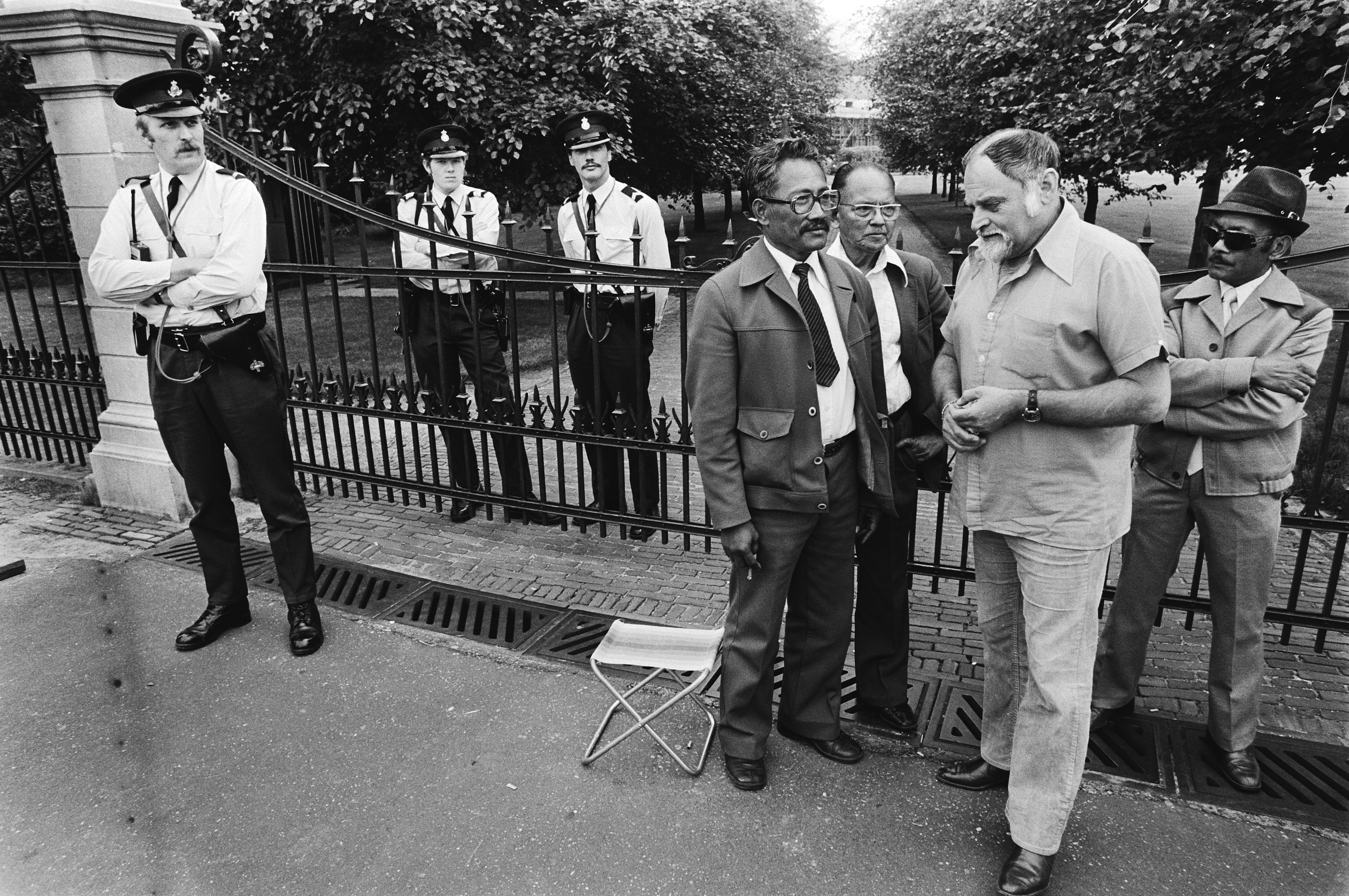
Westerling and KNIL veterans protesting in front of Soestdijk Palace in 1979

Thereafter, Westerling studied voice at the Amsterdam conservatory. His début as a tenor in Puccini's Tosca in Breda in 1958, however, proved unsuccessful. After that, Westerling led a seemingly unremarkable life. He said he wrote some military reports, including for a foreign oil company, but turned down offers to work as a mercenary. Yet not a year went by that the newspapers did not write about him; he was regularly mentioned in connection with foreign conflicts and planned attacks; several times he was refused entry to the country at foreign airports. When former prime minister Willem Drees spoke in 1969 about the "misdeeds" committed under Westerling's command, he unsuccessfully filed a libel complaint. A government committee concluded in 1969, partly on the basis of an earlier 1954 report, that military excesses had indeed taken place on Celebes. Van Rij and Stam's report held Westerling, along with Captain Rijborz, responsible for some of these excesses. Westerling responded with an interview in Vrij Nederland, where he defended the use of summary executions. To De Tijd, he complained about the "Westerling myth" perpetuated by the lack of an official investigation. Just hours before his death in 1987, he is said to have announced his intention to file summary proceedings against the historian Loe de Jong for accusing the Dutch forces in the Dutch East Indies of atrocities in a draft chapter and for portraying Westerling as a ruthless soldier.

He maintained his reputation as a fire-eater; as recently as 1977, he was mentioned in connection with possible kidnapping of war crimes suspect Pieter Menten. In 1979, he campaigned for the payment of overdue salaries to former KNIL soldiers, using strong language.

=== Personal life ===
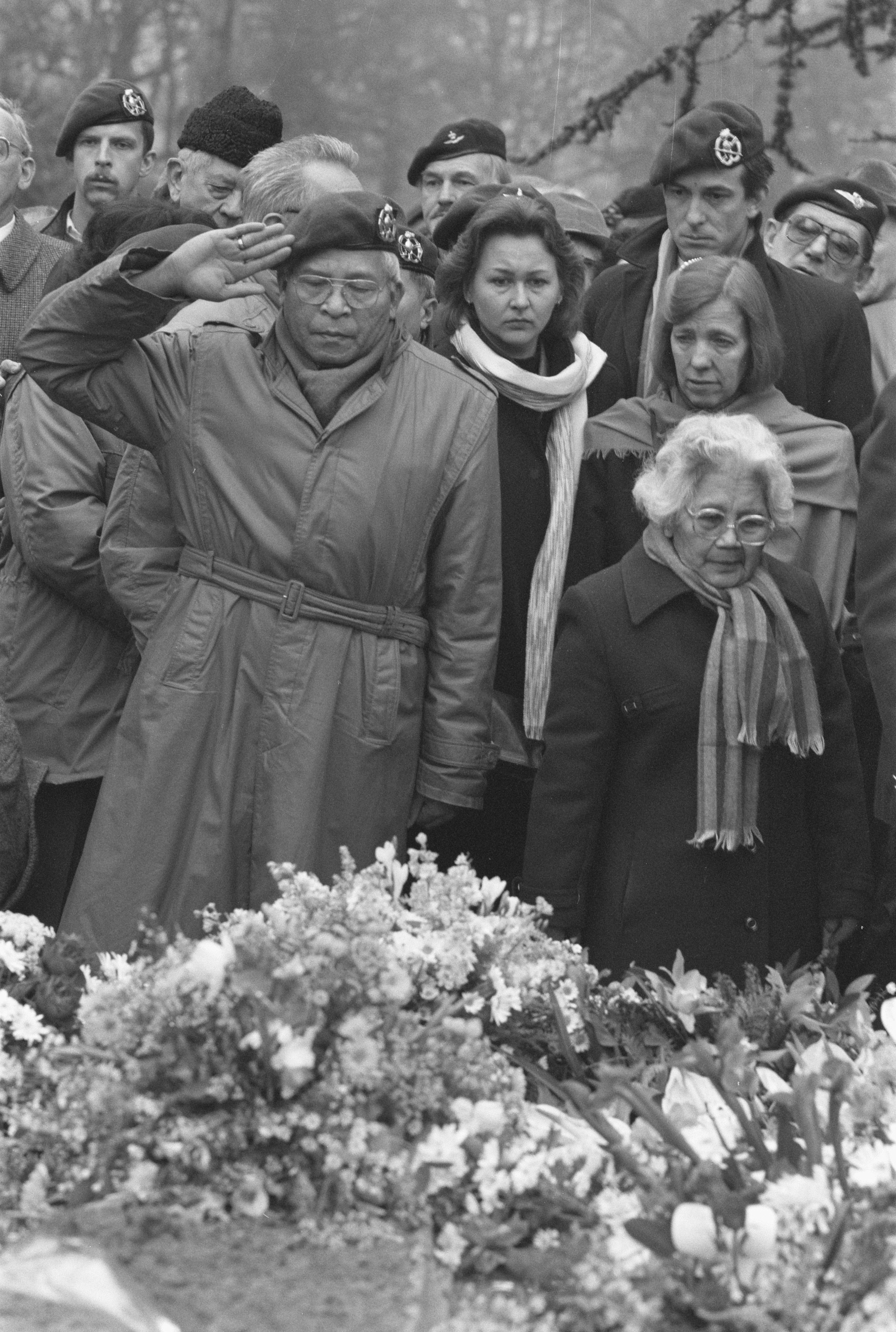
A veteran saluting during the funeral of Raymond Westerling

Westerling was married three times. From one of the first two marriages, he had a daughter. He also had a daughter, named Palmyra Westerling, from his third marriage. Around 1955, he lived in Marssum. Westerling later divorced and remarried. He moved to Amsterdam, where he ran an antiquarian bookshop in Amsterdam. He died in his hometown of Purmerend at the age of 68 in his sleep from cardiac arrest and was buried at Nieuwe Ooster Cemetery in Amsterdam.

== Allegations of atrocities ==
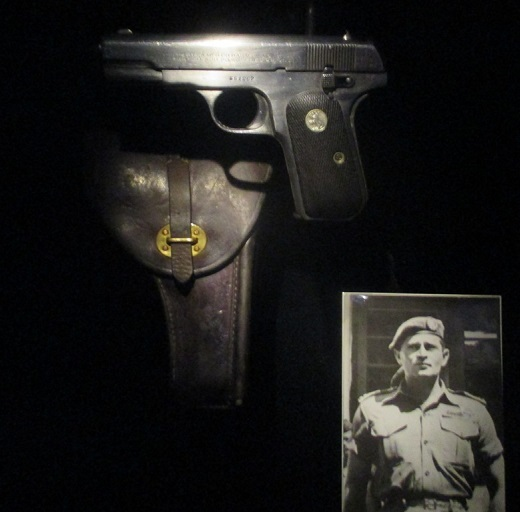
Raymond Westerling's pistol

Westerling's life in the Netherlands was dominated by allegations of atrocities over his actions in South Celebes. Westerling continued to defend his purges and denied accusations of atrocities. That, when he saw fit, he acted ruthlessly, he never contradicted. In interviews, however, he stated "The introduction of martial law in South Celebes was the result of purely human reasoning, although for many people it was a bestial act. But go deeper into the reasoning of why I was forced to do it - I put myself aside, I risked martial law and public opinion - then it is the only way to restore peace and order on Celebes with a minimum of bloodshed."

His memoirs devote a chapter to his self-defense. "They painted me as a bloodthirsty monster, who attacked the people of Celebes by fire and sword and exposed all those, who in the interest of Indonesia's national independence resisted Dutch rule, to a merciless campaign of repression". Westerling stated he had based his tactics on the premise that he performed the role of policeman, combating terror: "I arrested terrorists, not because they acted as instigators of the Republican government... but because they made themselves guilty of open and unmistaken crimes...I never had them [his troops] bombard a village, nor did I take the hut of innocent under fire. I had executed some criminals, but nobody had died needlessly or wrongly by my doing.

=== Investigation by the Dutch government ===
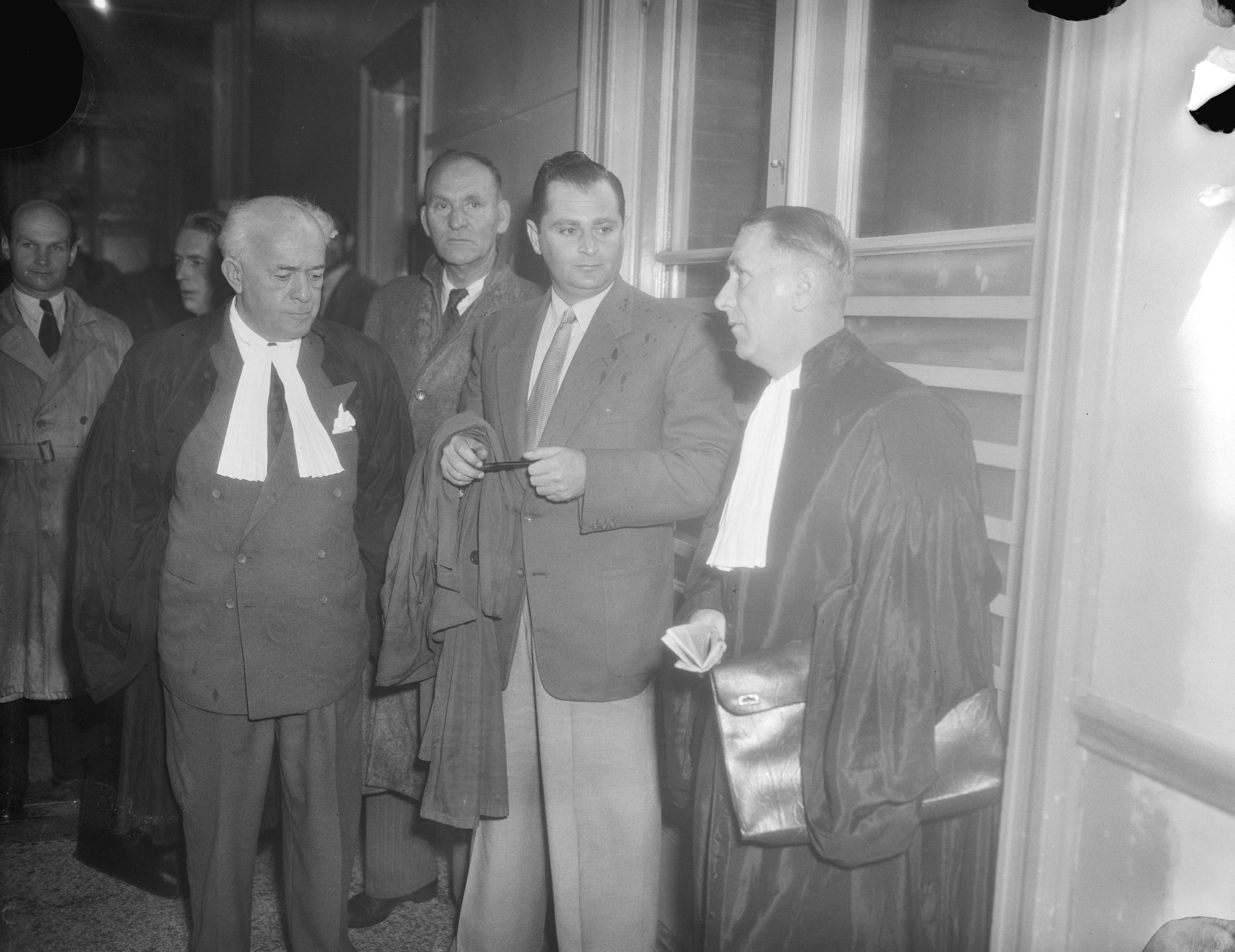
Raymond Westerling under inquiry in 1952

Westerling's actions were investigated by the Enthoven Commission at the behest of the Lieutenant Governor-General of the Dutch East Indies, H.J. van Mook. That Enthoven Report was presented to the Drees cabinet in 1948. It was not made public and nothing was done with it. In that report, this committee concluded that Westerling's actions were warranted.

After a revealing publication in 1949 in De Groene Amsterdammer about Dutch atrocities in Java, the Van Rij and Stam committee was set up, using the Enthoven report. Their report was submitted to ministers Donker (Justice) and Staf (War) of the third Drees cabinet in 1954. Van Rij and Stam concluded, among other things, "Both the Lieutenant-Governor-General, and the Military Authority, as well as in its opinions the Mr Procurator-General were at fault". Any legal prosecution of the perpetrators of atrocities would have to "bring up the whole background and all responsibilities will have to be checked".

In the late 1960s, following revelations by psychologist Joop Hueting, the Dutch government had archival research conducted by historians led by Cees Fasseur into the excesses committed by Dutch troops in Indonesia: this led to the publication of Excessennota in June 1969. This paper highlights the failure of administrative and political accountability. On 2 December 2016, in response to Rémy Limpach's study, The Burning Campongs of General Spoor, the Rutte cabinet decided that a broad, independent investigation should be conducted into the broad context of post-war decolonisation (including society) and political, administrative, judicial and military action in 1945–1949 in the Dutch East Indies, both from a Hague and local perspective. That research needed to take an integrated approach and delve deeper into issues that had been addressed in Limpach's study. The spiral of violence of the Bersiap needed to be systematically examined. Political decision-making in The Hague on decolonisation was the subject of that study. The aftermath after 1949 and veteran care also needed further investigation. The Royal Institute for Language, Land and Ethnology (KITLV), the Netherlands Institute for Military History (NIMH) and the Netherlands Institute for War, Holocaust and Genocide Studies (NIOD) have been commissioned by the cabinet to conduct the research.

=== Renewed interest ===
The Dutch military operations in the Dutch East Indies continue to cause a stir in the Netherlands. The Dutch Honorary Debts Committee Foundation is working to ensure that the relatives of victims of the purges in South Celebes receive compensation and recognition from the Netherlands.

In 1969, together with cameraman Hans van der Busken and journalist Joop Buddinghausen, they managed to interview Westerling. It was Westerling's first recorded appearance on television, but unfortunately, fearing threats and repercussions, not a single Dutch broadcaster dared to broadcast it. After the footage was donated, it was finally broadcast on Dutch television for the first time on the program "Altijd Wat" (There's Just) on NCRV television on 14 August 2012, at 21.10. In the unseen interview, Westerling denied that atrocities were committed in the Dutch East Indies under his responsibility, saying in the interview:

"I am responsible and not the troops who have been under my orders. I personally take responsibility for the acts."

He further said, "I stand firmly behind my actions, with the understanding that one must distinguish between war crimes and severe measures, consistent and just under very difficult circumstances."

Westerling added "the hidden sadism in people in war conditions can flourish much faster than in normal situations."

He later stated that the Dutch government supported him. The news shocked and angered many veterans. As a result, journalists for the "Achter het Nieuws" event were escorted by the police because they were threatened.

In a 1971 interview he gave to the weekly Panorama Westerling revealed that he had court-martialed and executed 350 prisoners.

After a historian asked the interior minister for all documents relating to Westerling's coup against the Indonesian president in 1950, he was told that one document had been found at the AIVD that he could access. This document covered 11 pages. An appeal against this decision was rejected. In late July 2014, the Council of State ruled on appeal that it was implausible that the intelligence service AIVD had only one document about Westerling's failed coup. More documents should be found in the archives; possibly stored under a title other than 'the coup against Sukarno in 1950'. The minister had to take a new decision.

In August 2016, Australian historian Robert Cribb began investigating claims by widows and children of men allegedly executed there by Dutch soldiers in South Sulawesi. He had been appointed by the court in The Hague to do so.

=== Views in Indonesia and the Netherlands ===
According to Indonesian former colonel and military historian Prof Muhammad Natzir Said, Westerling cannot simply be labeled a war perpetrator. "Every soldier knows: under a State of War, people are shot dead on the spot. That is normal. Summary executions were not only carried out by Westerling, but also on our side. Quite a few spies of the Dutch were shot dead by us after being investigated on the spot. We then surrounded such a desa and if those people said, 'He is a mata-mate, spy of the KNIL....to the tree!'" In 1977, Natsir wrote that the stories about thousands of executions had been propaganda fables to generate sympathy for the Indonesian independence struggle.

Westerling's actions were denounced as a war criminal by the Indonesian government and left-wing parties in the Netherlands. Westerling was twice the subject of official inquiries. Dutch historian Nico Schulte Nordholt stated: "...his actions had the approval of the highest authorities, and in the eyes of the Dutch authorities, he was successful at the time. Determant and effective". In 1949, the Dutch–Indonesian agreement on transfer of power stipulated neither country would call the other on its wartime atrocities, thus ruling out any attempt by Indonesia to press for Westerling's extradition. Geersing wrote in his book, that Westerling received his orders from the political and military top in Batavia with the consent of the Dutch government representatives there. (Commissie-Generaal)

== Popular culture ==
Raymond Westerling was depicted by Marwan Kenzari in the 2020 film The East, which focuses on his role in leading counterinsurgency operations in South Sulawesi during the Indonesian National Revolution.
