= Joop Hueting =

20th century Dutch whistleblower

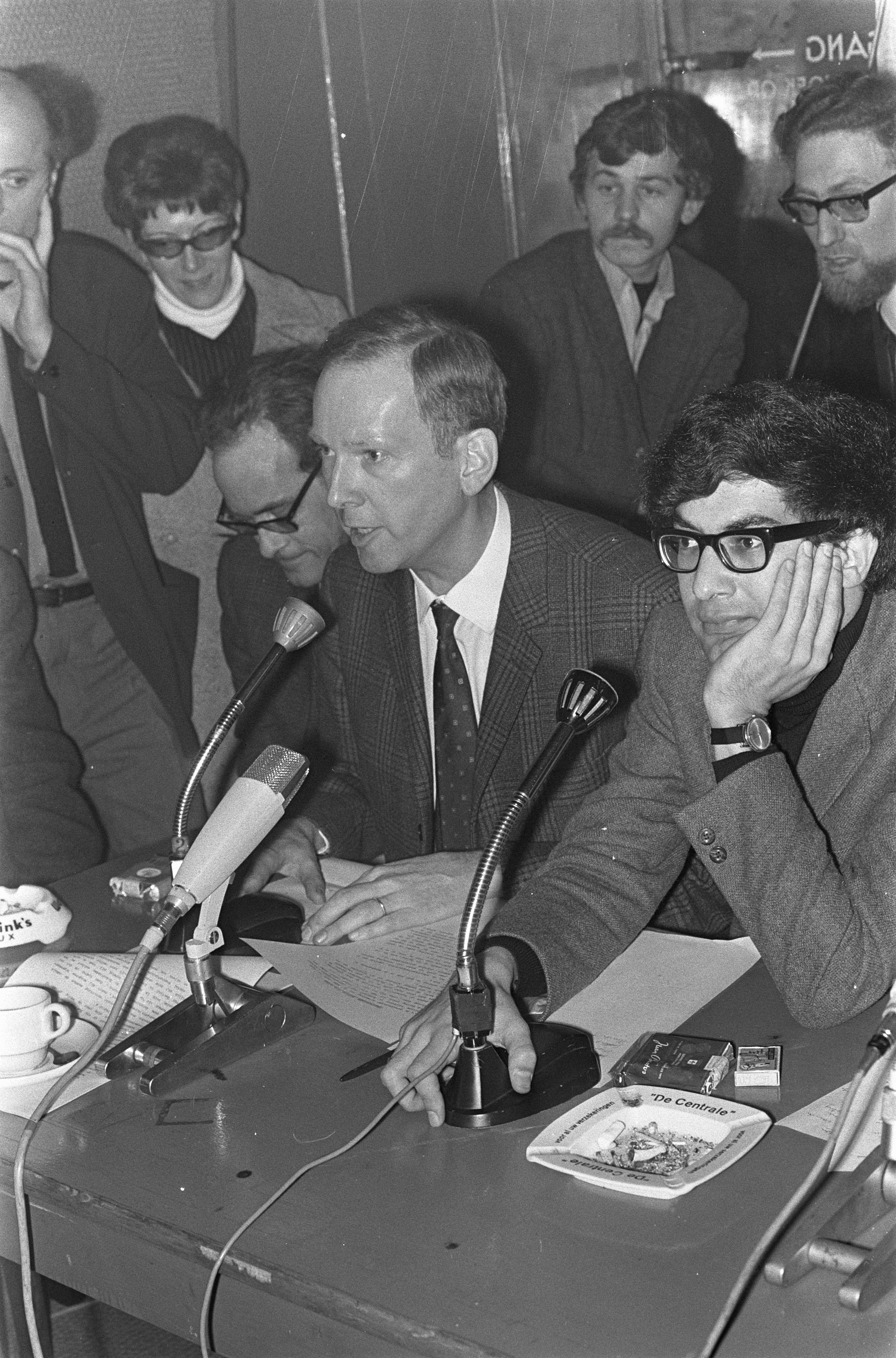
- Joop Hueting speaking in a cafe.
- Born: 1927; The Hague
- Died: November 11, 2018 (aged 90–91); Amsterdam

Johan Engelbert "Joop" Hueting (25 September 1927 - 11 November 2018) was a Dutch psychologist, soldier and whistleblower about war crimes committed by the Dutch military in the Indonesian National Revolution.

== Life ==
Hueting was born in The Hague on 25 September 1927. In 1946, he was sent as a soldier to Indonesia to take part in the Dutch military's actions against the recently declared Indonesia. He returned to the Netherlands in 1950.

On 17 January 1969, Hueting gave an interview to Dutch public broadcaster VARA in which he discussed the war crimes committed by his unit and him in Indonesia. The interview had originally been scheduled for 19 December 1968, but was moved in order not to interfere with Christmas season. The interview was the first to bring the crimes to the Dutch public's attention. It received wide attention, both positive and negative. Hueting and his family had to leave their home for some time due to threats to their lives.

The Dutch government conducted a short investigation in response to the revelations, resulting in the Excessennota which absolved most Dutch soldiers of responsibility.

Hueting died on 11 November 2018 in Amsterdam. He had collected a wide array of documents related to Indonesia in a private archive. As of 2020, these remained in private hands due to Dutch archives not being interested in acquiring them.
