= Hans Hirschfeld =

Dutch economist

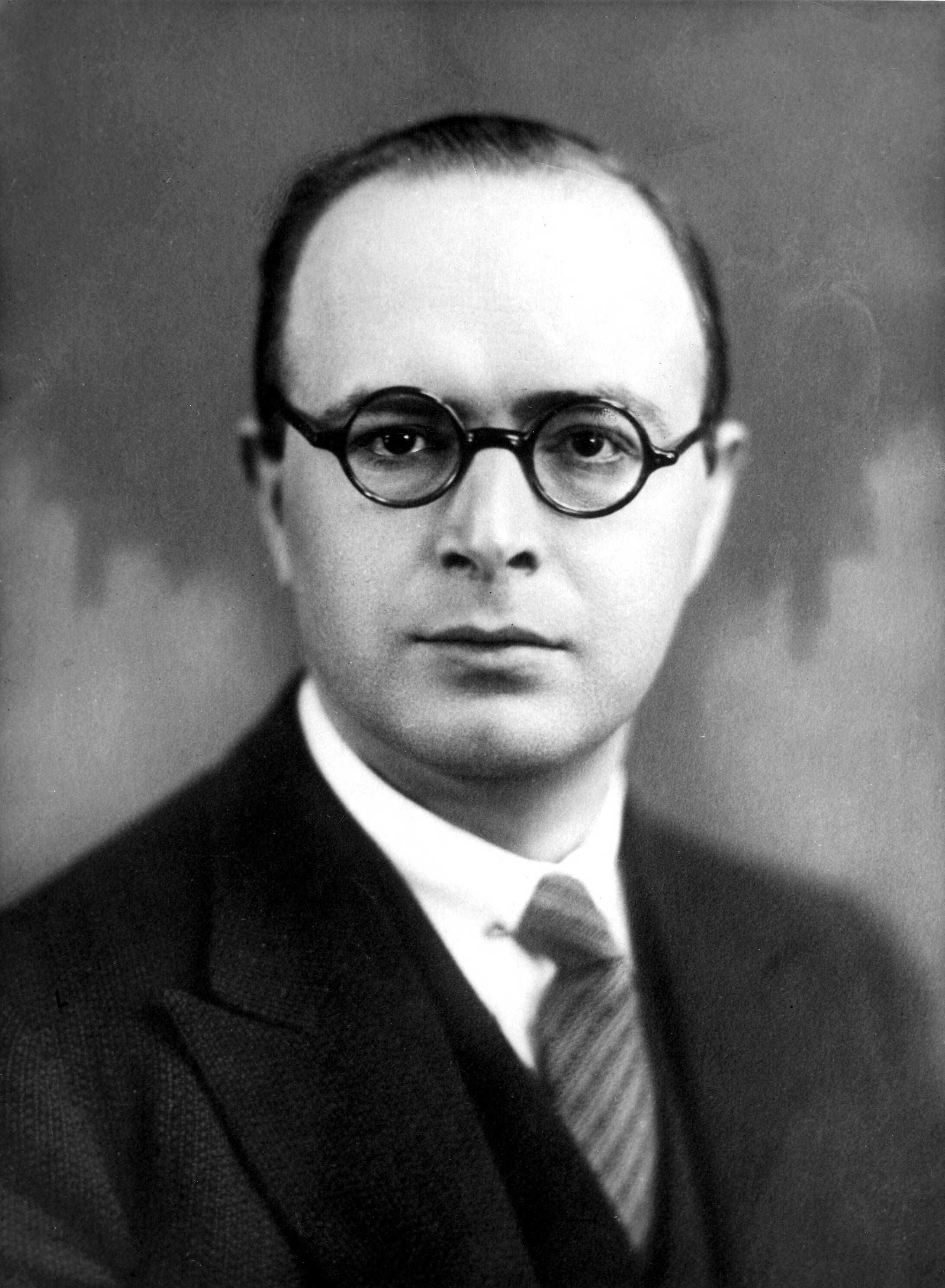
Hans Hirschfeld in 1932

Hans Hirschfeld (29 May 1899, in Bremen – 4 November 1961, in The Hague) was a Dutch economist.
