= Syarif Hamid II of Pontianak =

7th Sultan of Pontianak

Sultan Hamid II
- Syarif Abdul Hamid Alkadrie
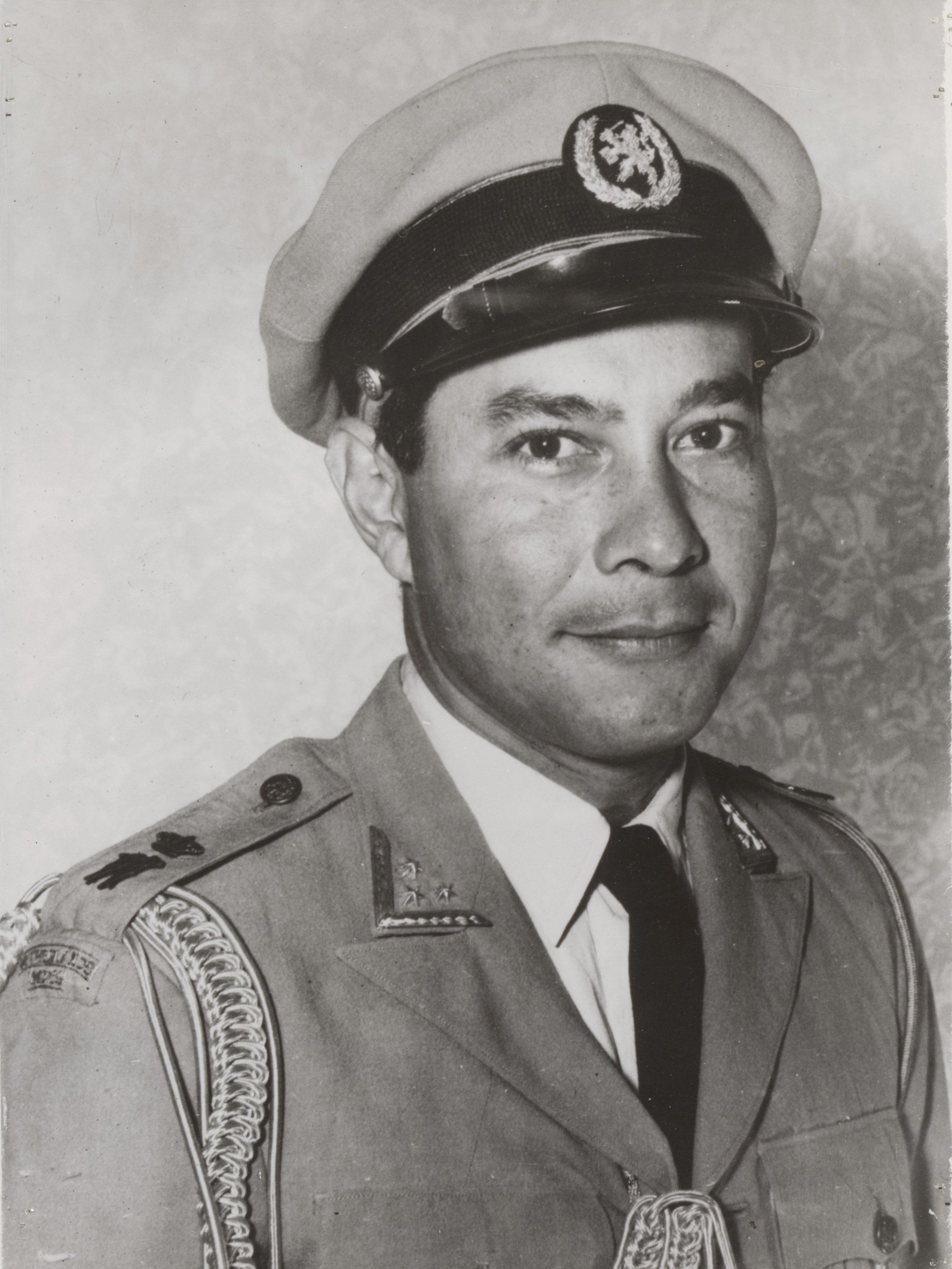
- Sultan Hamid II of West Borneo in the uniform of a General Major of the KNIL

7th Sultan of Pontianak
- Reign: 1945–1950
- Predecessor: Sultan Syarif Thaha
- Successor: Sultan Syarif Abubakar
- Born: 12 July 1913; Pontianak, Pontianak Sultanate, Dutch East Indies
- Died: 30 March 1978 (aged 64); Jakarta, Indonesia
- Spouse: Didie van Delden
- Issue: 2
- House: Alkadrie dynasty
- Father: Sultan Syarif Muhammad
- Mother: Syecha Jamilah Syarwani
- Religion: Sunni Islam

Sultan Hamid II (born Syarif Abdul Hamid Alkadrie; 12 July 1913 – 30 March 1978) was the 7th Sultan of Pontianak and the only President of the State of West Kalimantan from 1946 to its disestablishment in 1950. He was the eldest son of Sultan Syarif Muhammad Alkadrie. He was of mixed Malay-Arab ancestry and was raised by two British nationals — Salome Catherine Fox and Edith Maud Curteis.

His wife Didie van Delden was a young Dutch woman who bore him two children – both reside in the Netherlands. During the Indonesian National Revolution, he was sympathetic to the returning Dutch and their attempts to implement a federal Republic of the United States of Indonesia, viewing the unitary Republic of Indonesia as an extension of Javanese domination. He was also a colonel in the Royal Dutch East Indies Army and designed the Indonesian national emblem—Garuda Pancasila.

== Childhood and education ==
Until the age of 12, Hamid was raised by Scottish foster-mother Salome Catherine Fox and fellow British expatriate Edith Maud Curteis. Salome Fox was the sister of the head of a British trading firm based in Singapore. Under their tutelage, Hamid became fluent in English in addition to his native, Malay (standard Indonesian as well as his local Pontianak dialect). In 1933, Miss Fox died but he still remained in touch with her companion Curteis.

Syarif was educated at several Europeesche Lagere School (European Primary Schools) in Sukabumi, Pontianak, Yogyakarta and Bandung. He studied for one year at a Hogere Burgerschool (Senior High School) in Bandung but did not graduate from THS Bandung. Syarif completed his studies at the Koninklijke Militaire Academie in Breda, Holland; graduating as a lieutenant in the Royal Dutch East Indies Army.

== Japanese Occupation and the Indonesian Revolution ==
Garuda Pancasila is the most visible legacy of Sultan Hamid II

Following the Japanese occupation of the Dutch East Indies on 10 March 1942, he was interned by the Japanese for three years in a Javanese prison camp due to close ties with the Dutch. Hamid's resentment towards the Japanese occupiers was affected by the murders of 28 relatives and his mentor Miss Curteis. Hamid's father and two of his brothers along with many of the Malay elite of Kalimantan were executed by the Japanese in the Pontianak incidents. Following the Japanese surrender and defeat on 15 August 1945, Hamid was liberated by the returning Allied Powers that landed in Indonesia. He was subsequently promoted to the rank of colonel by the returning Dutch.

On 29 October 1945, he succeeded his father as the Sultan of Pontianak, adopting the title Sultan Hamid II. During the Indonesian National Revolution, Sultan Hamid II acquired an important position as a delegate for the State of West Kalimantan and always participated in negotiations at Malino, Denpasar, the Federal Consultative Assembly (BFO) and the Dutch-Indonesian Round Table Conference in Indonesia and the Netherlands. As an active leader in the BFO, he was a firm supporter of federalism and opposed President Sukarno's concept of a unitary Indonesian Republic due to its domination by the Javanese.

Sultan Hamid II quickly ascended to the position of Adjudant in Buitengewone Dienst bij HM de Koningin der Nederlanden (Adjutant in the Extraordinary Service of Her Majesty the Queen of the Netherlands), which is the highest position as assistant to the Dutch Queen. As a colonel, he was the first Indonesian to acquire a significant military position in the colonial army. Due to international opposition to Dutch attempts to reinstate control over Indonesia in the United Nations, the Dutch were forced to recognise Sukarno's Republic as the de facto government of Java and Sumatra and to grant independence to a Republic of the United States of Indonesia on 27 December 1949.

== The APRA Coup and Unitarianism ==
On 17 December 1949, Hamid II was appointed by Sukarno to the RUSI Cabinet but held no portfolio. This Cabinet was headed by Prime Minister Mohammad Hatta and included 11 Republicans and five Federalists. This federal government was short-lived due to conflicting differences between the Republicans and the Federalists as well as growing popular support for a unitary state.

Hamid II would subsequently conspire with the former KNIL Captain Raymond Westerling to organise an anti-Republican coup in Bandung and Jakarta. On 22 December 1949, Westerling offered the leadership of APRA to Hamid II, this was initially rejected. Although, on 10 January 1950, Hamid II would agree to the position, with three conditions: APRA troops have to be Indonesians, Westerling told him all the location and strength of APRA troops, and Hamid II want to know the funding of APRA. Westerling's Legion of the Just Ruler (Angkatan Perang Ratu Adil; APRA) comprised elements of the KNIL, the Regiment Special Forces, the Royal Netherlands Army and several Dutch nationals including two police inspectors. On 23 January 1950, APRA overwhelmed the small RUSI garrison and occupied parts of Bandung until they were driven away by reinforcements under Major General Engels.

On 26 January 1950, elements of Westerling's forces infiltrated Jakarta as part of a coup d'état to overthrow the RUSI Cabinet. They also planned to assassinate several prominent Republican figures including the Defense Minister Sultan Hamengkubuwono IX, Secretary-General Ali Budiardjo, and APRIS Chief of Staff, TB Simatupang. To hide his involvement, Hamid II would receive a gunshot in his leg. Later Hamid II would ask Soekarno and Muhammad Hatta for a new cabinet to be formed, and he would be the new Defence Minister. However, they were intercepted and forced to flee by Indonesian military forces. Meanwhile, Westerling was forced to flee to Singapore and APRA had ceased to function by February 1950.

Evidence from arrested co-conspirators led to the incarceration of Hamid II on 5 April. By 19 April, Hamid II had confessed to his involvement in the botched Jakarta coup and to planning an abortive second attack on Parliament scheduled for 15 February. Due to the presence of RUSI troops, the attack was aborted. The role of the Pasundan government in the coup led to its dissolution by 10 February, further undermining the federal structure. By late March 1950, Hamid's West Kalimantan was one of the four remaining federal states in the United States of Indonesia.

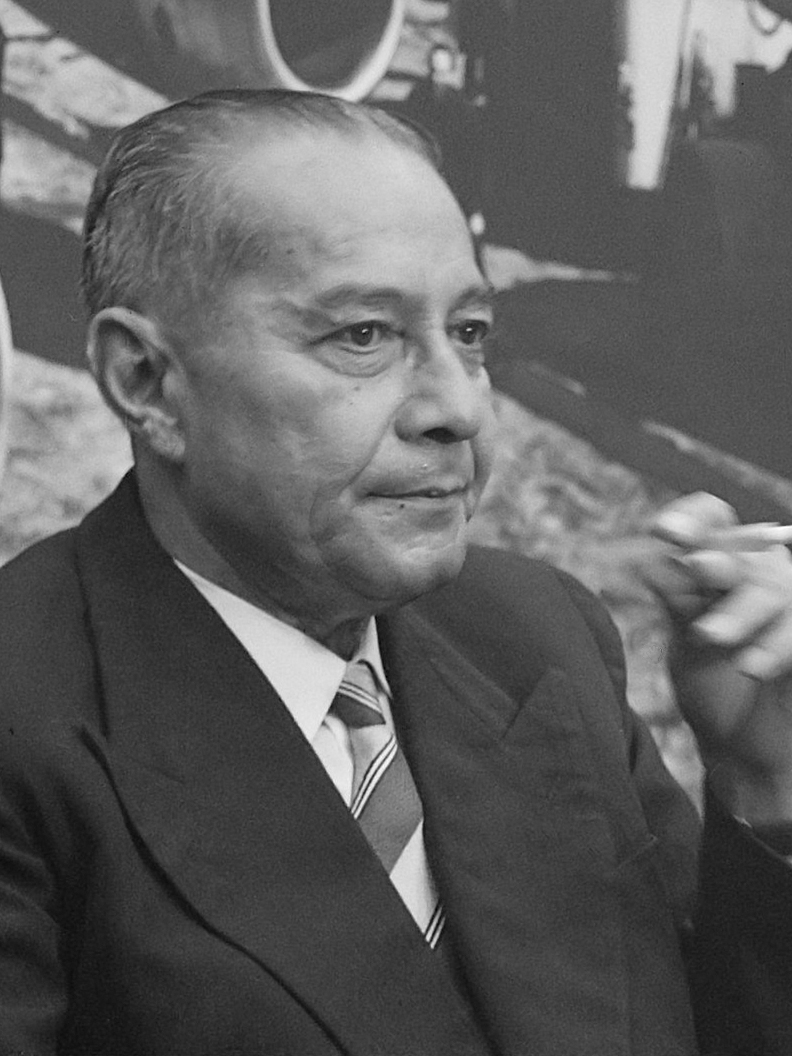
Sultan Hamid II (1966)

Hamid's role in the coup led to increased agitation in West Kalimantan for its integration into the Republic of Indonesia. Following a fact-finding mission by the Government Commission, the RUSI House of Representatives voted by fifty votes to one to merge West Kalimantan into the Republic of Indonesia. Following clashes with demobilised KNIL troops in Makassar and the attempted secession of an Ambonese Republic of South Moluccas, the federal United States of Indonesia was dissolved on 17 August 1950, turning Indonesia into a unitary state dominated by the central government in Jakarta.

== Family ==
Sultan Hamid II's Dutch wife Didie van Delden was styled as Sultana Maharatu Mas Makhota and they had two children, a son and a daughter. Their son was styled as Pangeran (Prince) Syarif Max Yusuf Alkadrie, and died in the Netherlands on 9 August 2018. Sultana Maharatu died on 19 June 2010.

== Bibliography ==
- Kahin, George McTurnan (1952). Nationalism and Revolution in Indonesia. Ithaca, N.Y.: Cornell University Press. ISBN 0-8014-9108-8.
- McDonald, Lachie (1998). Bylines: Memoirs of a War Correspondent. East Roseville, N.S.W: Kangaroo Press. ISBN 978-0-86417-955-5.
