= Legion of the Just Ruler =

Pro Dutch militia in Indonesia

- Legioen van de Rechtvaardige Vorst; Angkatan Perang Ratu Adil (APRA)
- Flag and emblem
- Other name: Legion of Ratu Adil
- Leaders: Capt. Raymond Westerling; Syarif Hamid II
- Founded: 15 January 1949
- Dates active: 1949–1950
- Dissolved: February 1950
- Country: United States of Indonesia (USI)
- Active regions: State of Pasundan
- Ideology: Pro-Dutch imperialism

The Legion of the Just Ruler (Dutch: Legioen van de Rechtvaardige Vorst, Indonesian: Angkatan Perang Ratu Adil; APRA) or the Legion of Ratu Adil was a pro-Dutch militia and private army established in the aftermath of the Indonesian National Revolution. It was founded by the former KNIL Captain Raymond Westerling following his demobilisation on 15 January 1949. The militia's name was derived from a passage from the medieval Book of Prophecies of Joyo Boyo which prophesied the coming of a Just Ruler (Ratu Adil) who would be of Turkish descent and come to save the people of Java and establish universal peace and justice. With his mixed Turkish heritage in mind, Westerling used the myth of the Just Ruler to create a following.

Westerling claimed to be fighting to preserve the component states of the federal Republic of the United States of Indonesia against what he perceived as the Javanese-dominated unitary Republic of Indonesia led by Sukarno and Hatta. APRA was recruited from several anti-Republican factions including former Republican guerrillas, Darul Islam fighters, Ambonese, Malays, Minahasans, demobilised KNIL, Special Forces Regiment and Royal Netherlands Army personnel. By 1950, APRA had evolved from a series of rural self-defense units into a 2,000-strong fighting force. Unhappy with the growing influence of Sukarno's government, Westerling conspired with the federalist Sultan of Pontianak Hamid II to launch a coup in January 1950.

On 23 January 1950, APRA launched a coup d’état against the Republican government. While the Legion managed to temporarily occupy Bandung, they failed to occupy Jakarta. Westerling had planned to overthrow the RUSI Cabinet and assassinate several prominent Republican figures including the Defense Minister Sultan Hamengkubuwono IX and Secretary-General Ali Sadikin. The coup's failure demoralized the Legion's belief in Westerling and he was forced to flee to Singapore. Without a strong leader, APRA had ceased to function by February 1950. APRA's actions led to the incarceration of Hamid II and accelerated the dissolution of the federal United States of Indonesia on 17 August 1950, turning Indonesia into a unitary state dominated by the central government in Jakarta.
