= Bersiap =

Phase of the Indonesian National Revolution (1945–1947)

Bersiap killings
- Part of the Indonesian National Revolution
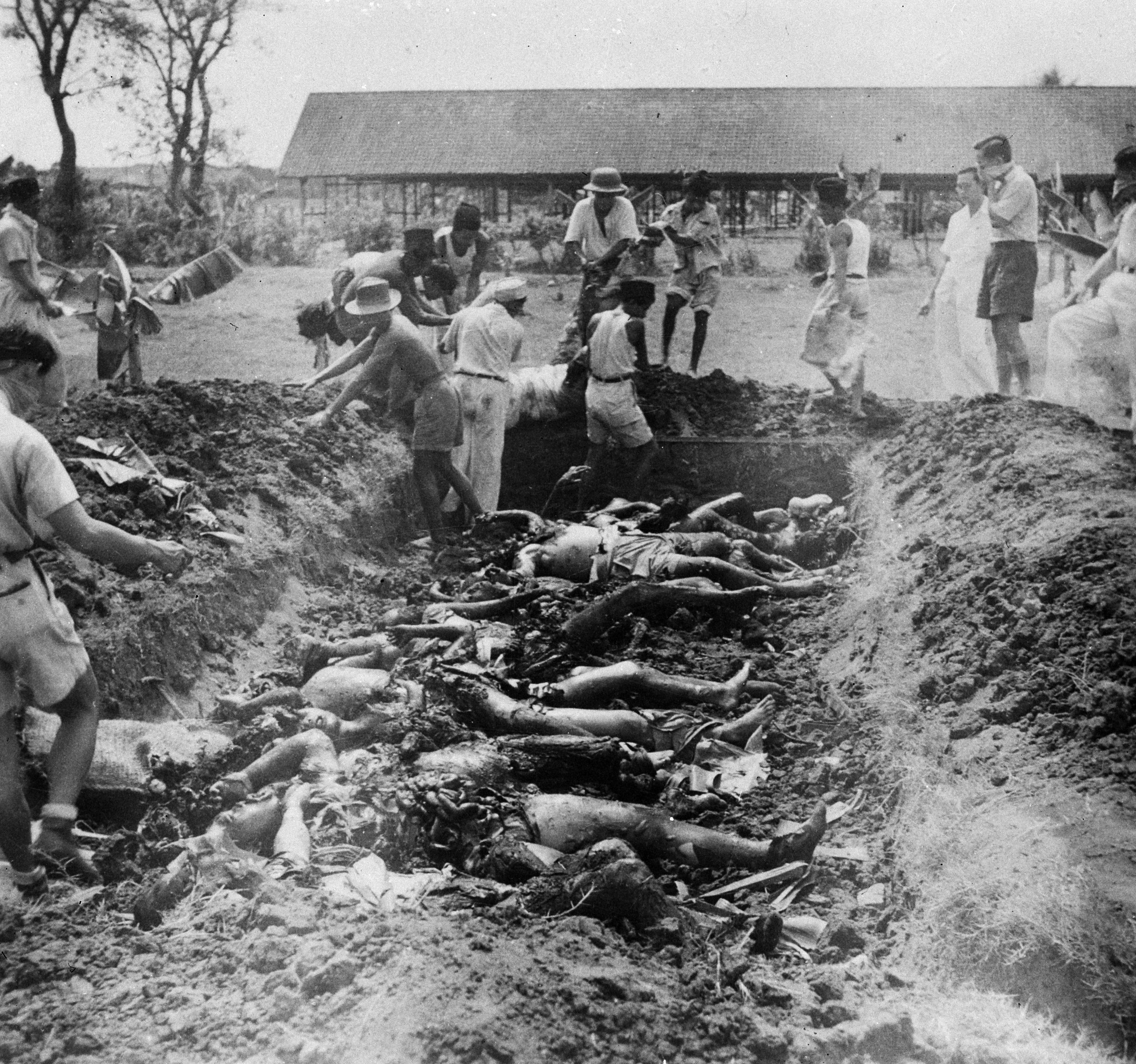
- Bodies of murdered Chinese in a mass grave following the Mergosono massacre, 1947
- Location: Dutch East Indies (present-day Indonesia)
- Date: August 1945 – November 1947
- Target: Chinese, Europeans, Indos, Japanese, Korean POWs, Indonesian Christians, Native nobility and elites.
- Attack type: Eliticide, ethnic cleansing, mass murder, massacre, politicide, religious violence, revolutionary violence, sexual violence
- Deaths: 3,500–30,000 (see casualties)
- Perpetrators: Indonesian nationalist militias and civilians
- Motive: Anti-colonialism, Christophobia, Europhobia, Indonesian nationalism, Sinophobia, vengeance, xenophobia

In Indonesian historiography, the term Bersiap ("Get ready" or "Be prepared" in English) refers to the violent and chaotic beginning of the Indonesian National Revolution following the end of World War II in Asia. In Indonesia, the term Berdaulat ("Sovereign") is also used for this transitional period. It began after Sukarno's proclamation of Indonesian Independence on 17 August 1945 and culminated during the power vacuum between the withdrawal of Japanese occupational forces and the gradual buildup of a British military presence, before the official handover to a Dutch military presence in March 1946.

Thousands of European and Indo-European people were killed by native Indonesians. Many non-Europeans accused of anti-revolutionary or pro-Dutch sentiment also fell victim to violence, such as Chinese civilians, Japanese and Korean prisoners of war, as well as native Indonesians such as the Moluccans, Ambonese, Minahasans and Timorese along with Javanese people, Bantenese people, Malays, Minangkabau people and Batak people of higher social and economic standing. The violence led to forced repatriation and the proliferation of a worldwide Indo-European diaspora.

Instances of wanton violence had decreased by the time British forces withdrew in 1946 and after the Dutch had rebuilt their military capacity in the region, though revolutionary and intercommunal killings continued into 1947. Meanwhile, the Indonesian revolutionary fighters were well into the process of forming a formal military and stemming violent excesses. The last troops of the former Imperial Japanese Armed Forces had been evacuated by July 1946.

== Term ==
The term Bersiap is derived from the battle cry and perpetual call to arms "Siap!" ("Get ready!" or "Be prepared!"), uttered by Indonesian nationalists when potential enemies of the revolution entered pro-republican areas. Originally coined by Dutch Indonesian survivors of the period, the term soon saw use in academic works in Dutch and English.

On Java, other terms aside from bersiap and berdaulat are commonly used, such as gedoran in Depok, ngeli in Banten and surrounding West Java, and gegeran and dombreng in Central Java.

In 2022, Indonesian historian Bonnie Triyana sparked controversy when he published an editorial in the Dutch newspaper NRC Handelsblad regarding a Rijksmuseum exhibit about the Indonesian National Revolution. Triyana, who was a guest curator on the exhibit, stated that the term Bersiap had a strong racist connotation in the Netherlands, and that its use invoked stereotypes of Indonesians as "primitive and uncivilized", and claimed that the team of curators agreed that the term would not be used in the exhibition. As a response, Hans Moll, head of the Federation of Dutch Indos (Federatie Indische Nederlanders, FIN), accused the Rijksmuseum of genocide denial, censorship, and falsifying history by ignoring that thousands of Dutch people had been brutally tortured, raped, and murdered by Indonesians because of their ethnicity. The museum later stated that the term would continue to be used in the exhibit and that Triyana had been expressing his personal opinion, not that of the curatorial team. Both Hans Moll of the FIN and Jeffry Pondaag of the Dutch Honorary Debts Committee Foundation filed police reports, but the police decided not to pursue charges.

Today, the term Bersiap killings is also used to avoid confusion.

== Indonesian independence declared ==
On 15 August 1945, the Japanese surrendered to the Allies. As there was, for the most part, no Allied re-conquest of the western part of the Dutch East Indies (The eastern islands were already occupied by the Allies), the Japanese were still in charge on Java and Sumatra and had received specific orders to maintain the status quo until Allied forces arrived on these islands. Sukarno, Hatta, and the older leadership were hesitant to act and did not want to provoke conflict with the Japanese. Vice Admiral Tadashi Maeda, fearing volatile youth groups, and the demoralised Japanese troops, wanted a quick transfer of power to the older generation of Indonesian leaders.

While the older nationalist leadership group, including Sukarno and Hatta, were reluctant, younger members of the new elite, the 'youth' (Indonesian: pemuda), believed they had a duty to push for revolution. A group associated with Menteng 31 kidnapped both Sukarno and Hatta and forced them to agree to declaring Indonesian independence. On 17 August 1945, two days after the surrender, Sukarno and Hatta declared independence at Sukarno's house in Jakarta. Indonesian staff briefly seized Jakarta radio from their Japanese supervisors and broadcast the news of the declaration across Java.

== The start of the revolution ==
It was mid-September before news of the declaration of independence spread across the island of Java, and many Indonesians far from the capital Jakarta did not believe it. As the news spread, most Indonesians came to regard themselves as pro-Republican, and a mood of revolution swept across the country. External power had shifted; it would be weeks before the Allied Forces entered the island of Java, and the Dutch were too weakened by World War II. The Japanese, on the other hand, were required by the terms of the surrender to both lay down their arms and maintain order; a contradiction that some resolved by handing weapons to Japanese-trained Indonesians. At the time of the surrender, there were 70,000 Japanese troops in Java and Sukarno and Hatta were concerned that celebratory independence rallies would result in the guns of Japanese troops being turned on Indonesian crowds. While the older leadership set about constructing a government on paper, they could do little to curb younger mobs who attacked sultans and other members of the Indonesian elite, retaliated violently against those village heads who had assisted Japanese oppression of Indonesian peasants, attacked other alleged "traitors", and fought for turf and weapons.

The resulting power vacuums in the weeks following the Japanese surrender created an atmosphere of uncertainty, but also one of opportunity for the Republicans. Many pemuda joined pro-Republic struggle groups (badan perjuangan). The most disciplined were soldiers from the Japanese-formed but disbanded Giyūgun (PETA) and Heiho groups. Many groups were undisciplined, due to both the circumstances of their formation and what they perceived as revolutionary spirit. In the first weeks, Japanese troops often withdrew from urban areas to avoid confrontations. However, as Republican youths fought to secure the cities and take arms, attacks on the Japanese did occur, usually following Allied orders for the Japanese to disarm Indonesian troops. Many of the Indonesian militia and some Japanese troops had no intention of allowing Indonesian disarmament, and in places like Bandung open conflict broke out.

By September 1945, control of major infrastructure installations, including railway stations and trams in Java's largest cities, had been taken over by Republican pemuda. To spread the revolutionary message, pemuda set up their own radio stations and newspapers, and graffiti proclaimed the nationalist sentiment. On most islands, struggle committees and militia were set up. Republican newspapers and journals were common in Jakarta, Yogyakarta, and Surakarta. They fostered a generation of writers known as angkatan 45 ('generation of 45') many of whom believed their work could be part of the revolution. In southern Kalimantan, Australian Communist soldiers spread the word of the Indonesian independence declaration.

Republican leaders struggled to come to terms with popular sentiment; some wanted passionate armed struggle; others a more reasoned approach. Some leaders, such as the leftist Tan Malaka, spread the idea that this was a revolutionary struggle to be led and won by the Indonesian pemuda. Sukarno and Hatta, in contrast, were more interested in planning out a government and institutions to achieve independence through diplomacy. Pro-revolution demonstrations took place in large cities, including one led by Tan Malaka in Jakarta with over 200,000 people, which Sukarno and Hatta, fearing violence, successfully quelled.

By September 1945, many of the self-proclaimed pemuda, who were ready to die for '100% freedom', were becoming impatient. It was common for ethnic 'out-groups' — Dutch internees, Eurasians, Ambonese and Chinese — and anyone considered to be a spy, to be subjected to intimidation, kidnap, robbery, and sometimes murder, even organised massacres. Such attacks would continue to some extent for the course of the revolution. As the level of violence increased across the country, the Sukarno- and Hatta-led Republican government in Jakarta urged calm. However, pemuda, in favour of armed struggle, saw the older leadership as dithering and betraying the revolution, which often led to conflict amongst Indonesians.

== Formation of the Republican government ==
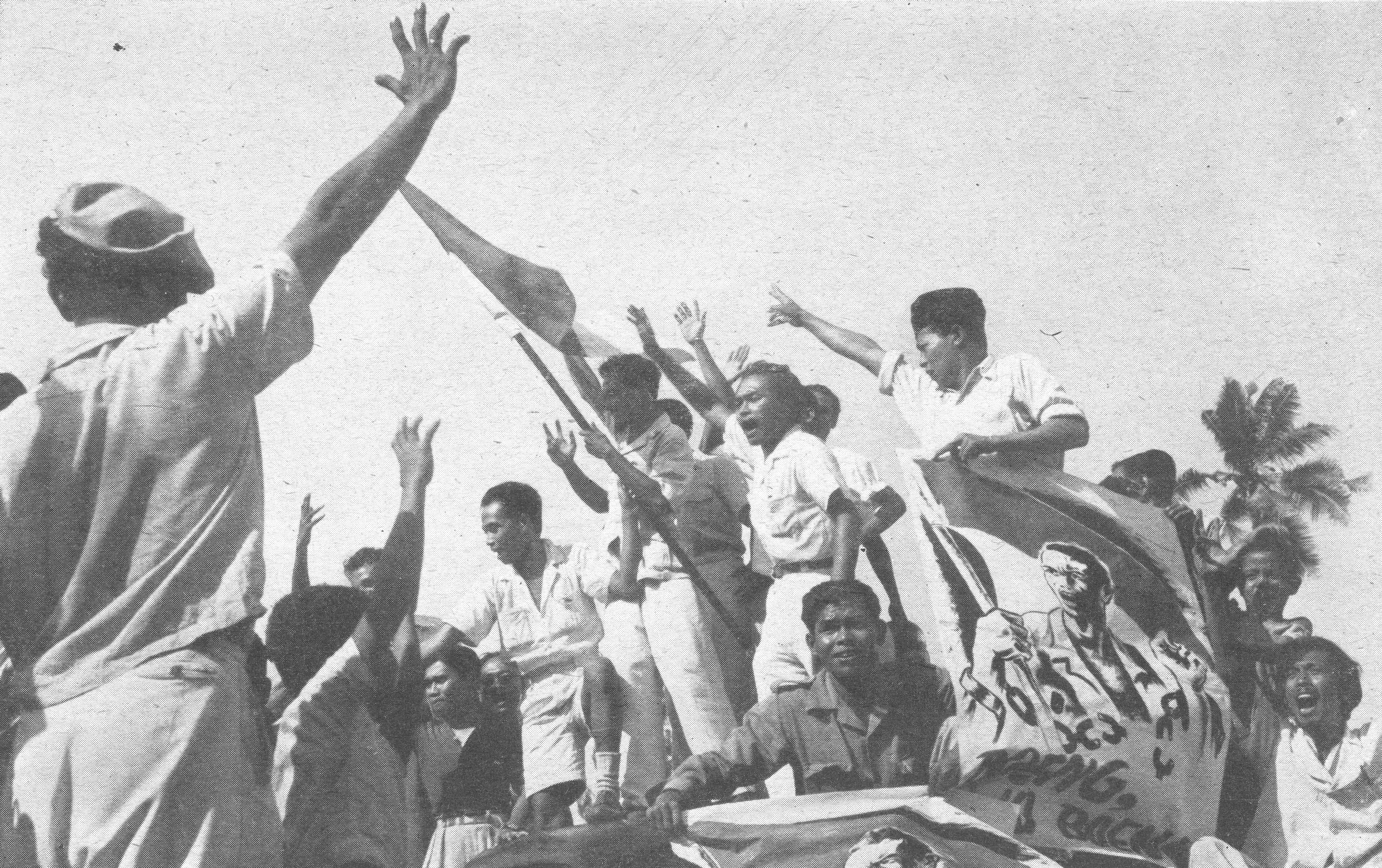
Indonesian nationalists ride through the streets with a poster ‘Boeng, Ajo Boeng’ to rally people, 12 November 1945

By the end of August, a central Republican government had been established in Jakarta. It adopted a constitution drafted during the Japanese occupation by the Preparatory Committee for Indonesian Independence. Following Japanese navy advice that Christian Indonesians in its area would disapprove and internal discussions and debates in Preparatory Committee for Indonesian Independence as well as personal lobby of Mohammad Hatta and Teuku Mohammad Hasan toward Ki Bagus Hadikusumo, provisions for a special role for Islam, such as the Jakarta Charter and a mandatory Muslim head of state, were not enacted. With general elections yet to be held, a Central Indonesian National Committee (KINP) was appointed to assist the president, however, elections were not held for 10 years. Similar committees were established at provincial and regency levels. Indonesian administrative advisors (sanyo), who had been appointed by the Japanese, and vice regents were appointed as Republican officials. This allowed for an efficient and discreet handover of power from the Japanese that minimised violation of the terms of the Japanese surrender.

Questions of allegiance immediately arose amongst indigenous rulers. Central Javanese principalities, for example, immediately declared themselves Republican, while many raja ('rulers') of the outer islands, were less enthusiastic. Such reluctance among many outer islands was sharpened by the radical, non-aristocratic, and sometimes Islamic nature of the Java-centric Republican leadership. Support did, however, come from South Sulawesi (including the La Mappanyukki, king of Bone, who still recalled battles against the Dutch from early in the century), most Makassarese and Bugis raja, followed him and supported the Republican Governor of Sulawesi, G.S.S.J. Ratulangi a Menadonese Christian. Many Balinese raja accepted Republican authority. In Aceh, the bitter animosity of pro-Republican religious leaders (ulama) and pro-Dutch aristocratic administrators (ulèebalangs) that has roots in the Aceh War, temporarily halted by the Japanese in 1942, turned to civil war. In Kalimantan, Kutai aristocrats, and Pontianak were unsupportive of the Republican form of government, while South Kalimantan aristocrats of Banjar was more receptive with Prince Mohammad Noor becoming Kalimantan Governor. He would send Hasan Basry to lead resistance in Meratus Mountains, while Tjilik Riwut would contact and lead resistance among local Dayak tribes.

Fearing the Dutch would attempt to re-establish their authority over Java and Sumatra, the new De facto Republican Government and its leaders moved quickly to strengthen the fledgling administration. Within Indonesia, the newly formed government, although enthusiastic, was fragile and focused in parts of Java. It was rarely and loosely in contact with the outer islands, which had more Japanese troops (particularly in Japanese naval areas), less sympathetic Japanese commanders, and fewer established Republican leaders and activists. In Sumatra, youths have virtual monopoly of revolutionary authority as a result. Many youths would also join Islamic-based revolutionary forces, which include Masyumi army of Barisan Hizbullah, and Barisan Sabilillah led by rural Islamic teachers. In November 1945, a parliamentary form of government was established and Sjahrir was appointed prime minister. Meanwhile, other islands were already occupied by Allied forces, including British, Australian and Dutch troops, before republican authority could be formed, hence demonstrations were put down and some pro-Republican officials arrested.

In the week following the Japanese surrender, the Giyūgun (PETA) and Heiho groups were disbanded by the Japanese. Command structures and membership vital for a national army were consequently dismantled. Thus, rather than being formed from a trained, armed, and organised army, the Republican armed forces began to grow in September from local initiatives by able, usually younger, charismatic leaders with/or access to arms. Creating a rational military structure that was obedient to central authority from such disorganisation, was one of the major problems of the period of revolution and after.

In the self-created Indonesian army, Japanese-trained Indonesian officers usually prevailed over those trained by the Dutch. In a meeting between former KNIL and former PETA Division Commanders, organised by chief of staff (KSO) of People's Security Agency, Oerip Soemohardjo, a thirty-year-old former school teacher and PETA member, Sudirman, was elected 'commander-in-chief' in Yogyakarta on 12 November 1945.

The Dutch accused Sukarno and Hatta of collaborating with the Japanese, and denounced the Republic as a creation of Japanese fascism. The Dutch East Indies administration had just received a ten million dollar loan from the United States to finance its return to the Dutch East Indies.

== Allied occupation ==
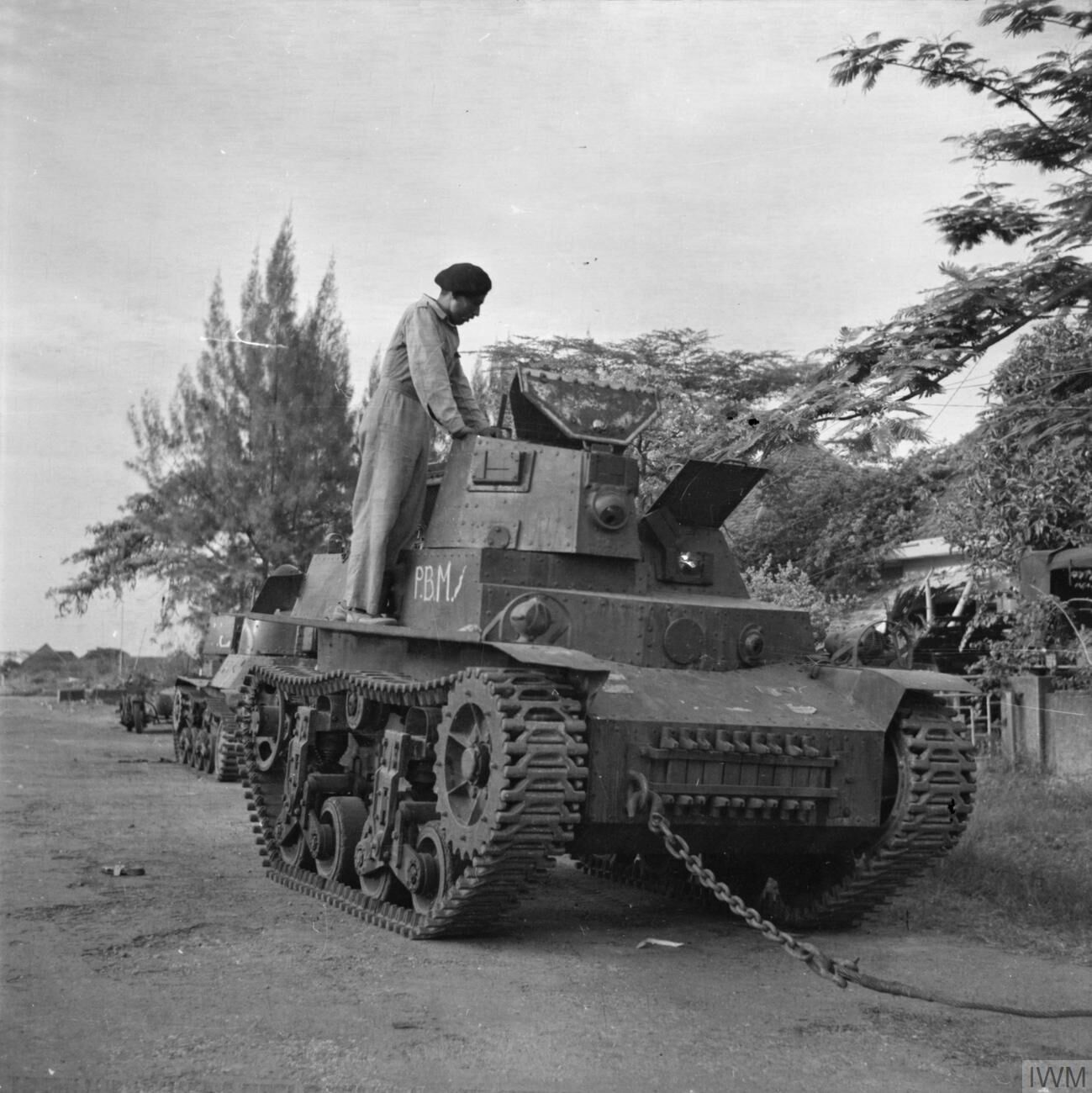
A soldier of an Indian armoured regiment examines a light tank used by Indonesian nationalists and captured by British forces during the fighting in Surabaya, November 1945

The Netherlands was critically weakened from World War II in Europe and did not return as a significant military force until early 1946. The Japanese and members of the Allied forces reluctantly agreed to act as caretakers. As US forces were focusing on the Japanese home islands, the archipelago was put under the jurisdiction of British Admiral Earl Louis Mountbatten, the Supreme Allied Commander, South East Asia Command. Allied enclaves already existed in Kalimantan (Indonesian Borneo), Morotai (Maluku), and parts of Irian Jaya; Dutch administrators had already returned to these areas. In the Japanese navy areas, the arrival of Allied troops quickly prevented revolutionary activities where Australian troops, followed by Dutch troops and administrators, took the Japanese surrender (except for Bali and Lombok). Due to the lack of strong resistance, two Australian Army divisions succeeded in occupying eastern Indonesia.

The British-led South East Asia Command was charged with restoring order and civilian government in Java. The Dutch took this to mean pre-war colonial administration and continued to claim sovereignty over Indonesia. Because the Dutch London-based government-in-exile were allied to the British, they expected the return of their colony, and the Japanese and members of the Allied Forces reluctantly fulfilled this promise. Before 24 August the Van Mook–MacArthur Civil Affairs Agreement was still in effect. The key provision of this agreement was that areas recaptured by Allied troops would revert to Dutch rule via the Netherlands Indies Civil Administration (NICA). After the Anglo–Dutch Civil Affairs Agreement was formally signed the agreement was accepted by the British. On 2 September, it was decided the agreement would apply to all areas of the Dutch East Indies occupied by British forces. British Commonwealth troops did not, however, land on Java to accept the Japanese surrender until late September 1945. Lord Mountbatten's immediate tasks included the repatriation of some 300,000 Japanese and the freeing of prisoners of war. He neither wanted nor had the resources to commit his troops to a long struggle to recapture Indonesia for the Dutch. The first British troops reached Jakarta in late September 1945, and arrived in the cities of Medan (North Sumatra), Padang (West Sumatra), Palembang (South Sumatra), Semarang (Central Java) and Surabaya (East Java) in October. In an attempt to avoid clashes with Indonesians, the British commander, Lieutenant General Sir Philip Christison, diverted soldiers of the former Dutch colonial army to eastern Indonesia, where Dutch reoccupation was proceeding smoothly. Tensions mounted as Allied troops entered Java and Sumatra; clashes broke out between Republicans and their perceived enemies, namely Dutch prisoners, Dutch colonial troops (KNIL), Chinese, Eurasians, and Japanese.

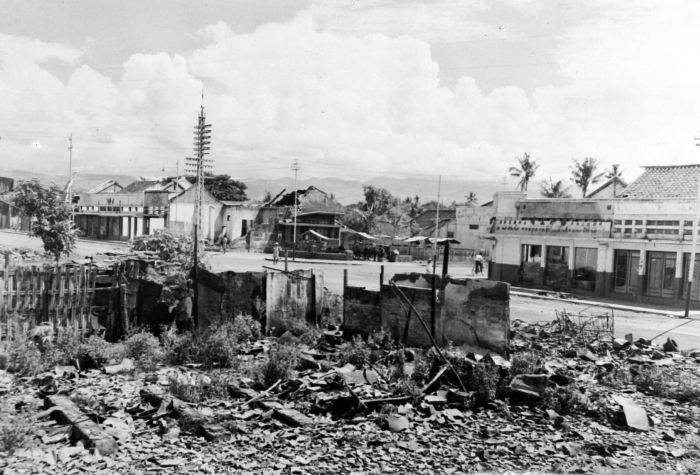
Destruction in the Chinese quarter of Bandung, pictured in 1947

The first stages of warfare began in October 1945 when, in accordance with the terms of their surrender, the Japanese tried to re-establish the authority they relinquished to Indonesian nationalists in the towns and cities. Japanese military police killed Republican pemuda in Pekalongan (Central Java) on 3 October, and Japanese troops drove Republican pemuda out of Bandung in West Java and handed the city to the British, but the fiercest fighting involving the Japanese was in Semarang. On 14 October, British forces began to occupy the city. Retreating Republican forces retaliated by killing between 130 and 300 Japanese prisoners they were holding. Five hundred Japanese and 2,000 Indonesians had been killed and the Japanese had almost captured the city six days later when British forces arrived. The Allies repatriated the remaining Japanese troops and civilians to Japan, although about 1,000 elected to remain behind and later assisted Republican forces in fighting for independence.

The British subsequently decided to evacuate the 10,000 Indo-Europeans and European internees in the volatile Central Java interior. British detachments sent to the towns of Ambarawa and Magelang encountered strong Republican resistance and used air attacks against the Indonesians. Sukarno arranged a ceasefire on 2 November, but by late November fighting had resumed and the British withdrew to the coast. Republican attacks against Allied and alleged pro-Dutch civilians reached a peak in November and December, with 1,200 killed in Bandung as the pemuda returned to the offensive. In March 1946, departing Republicans responded to a British ultimatum for them to leave the city of Bandung by deliberately burning down much of the southern half of the city in what is popularly known in Indonesia as the "Bandung Sea of Fire". The last British troops left Java in November 1946, but by this time 55,000 Dutch troops had already landed.

== Landing of NICA ==
With British assistance, the Dutch landed their Netherlands Indies Civil Administration (NICA) forces in Jakarta and other key centres. Republican sources reported 8,000 deaths up to January 1946 in the defence of Jakarta, but they could not hold the city. The Republican leadership thus established themselves in the city of Yogyakarta with the crucial support of the new sultan of Yogyakarta, Sri Sultan Hamengkubuwono IX. Yogyakarta went on to play a leading role in the revolution, which would result in the city being granted its own Special Territory status. In Bogor, near Jakarta, and in Balikpapan in Kalimantan, Republican officials were imprisoned. In preparation for the Dutch occupation of Sumatra, its largest cities, Palembang and Medan, were bombed. In December 1946, Special Forces Depot (DST), led by commando and counterinsurgency expert Captain Raymond 'Turk' Westerling, were accused of pacifying the southern Sulawesi region using arbitrary terror techniques, which were copied by other anti-Republicans. As many as 3,000 Republican militia and their supporters were killed in a few weeks.

On Java and Sumatra, the Dutch found military success in cities and major towns, but they were unable to subdue the villages and countryside. On the outer islands (including Bali), Republican sentiment was not as strong, at least among the elite. They were consequently occupied by the Dutch with comparative ease, and autonomous states were set up by the Dutch. The largest, the State of East Indonesia (NIT), encompassed most of eastern Indonesia, and was established in December 1946, with its administrative capital in Makassar.

== Phases ==
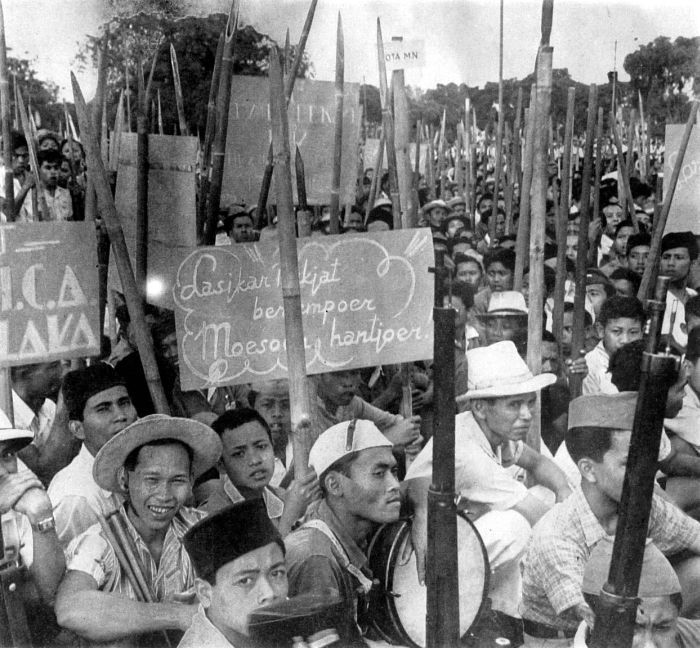
Pemuda on Java, armed with bamboo spears and Japanese rifles, 1946

Several phases are distinguished during the Bersiap period, each with different levels of violence and chaos.

The Bersiap was mostly situated on the island of Java. British troops landed on Sumatra in October 1945. Former civilian internees on Sumatra were put into large camps in the sparsely populated interior. They were taken to the coast to the cities of Padang, Medan, and Palembang. By the end of November, all Japanese internment camps on Sumatra had been cleared. On Sumatra, the Japanese cooperated with the British and the Indonesian republicans were less militant than on Java, because the British never went inland and preferred to bypass areas with difficult terrain like Aceh and Batakland. The situation there, despite rioting in Medan and Padang, was relatively peaceful by the end of 1945. The chaotic Bersiap violence did not occur on any other island in Indonesia.

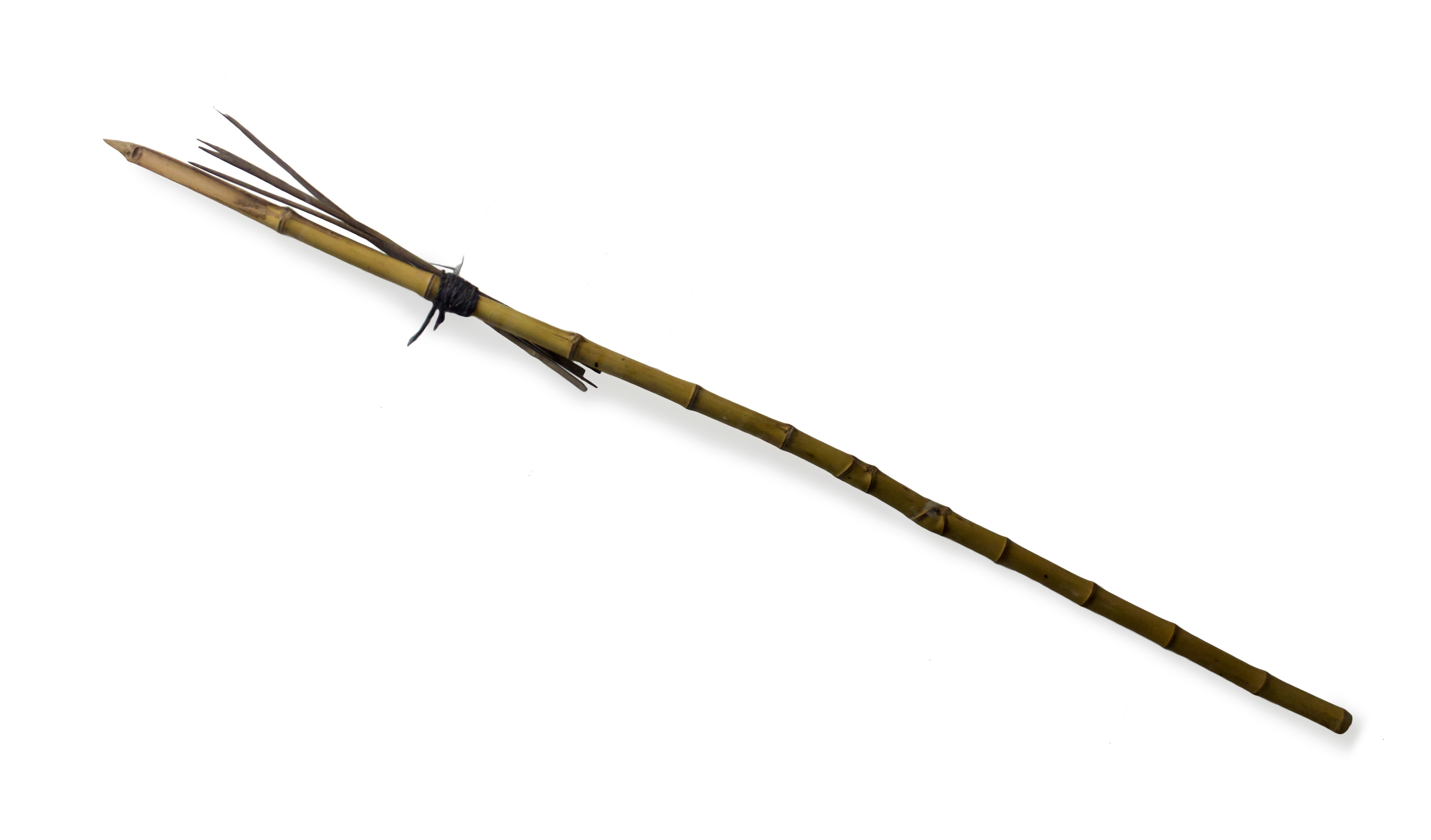
A lack of weaponry saw Indonesian nationalists use traditional weaponry, such as bambu runcing spears

Bersiap started immediately after the proclamation of Indonesian independence and before the arrival of the first British and Dutch armed forces. Chinese houses and shops were looted and their families killed. Militias were formed all over the Indonesian island, in North Sulawesi, youth formed BPMI militia. By October, Republican leaders tried to organize these militias into a formal para-military called the TKR, however, this effort was slowed by the allies.

On 18 September 1945 a group of ex-internees led by Mr. W.V.Ch. Ploegman raised a Dutch flag at the Yamato Hotel where they were staying. This action angered unarmed Surabaya youth. Several people died.

On 23 September 1945, Dutch Captain P.J.G. Huijer who went into Surabaya with permission from Admiral Helfrich (Commander of Dutch forces in the Indies), and General Van Oyen (KNIL Commander), claimed they were ordered by Mountbatten to request that General Nagano (IJA 16th Army) surrender. They actually did not have permission from the British. The Japanese troops paraded on the airfield and laid down their weapons, including tanks, anti-aircraft weapons, artillery, transports and ammunition, then withdraw to Semarang. The newly formed Indonesian TKR militia descend on the airfield and seized the arms. Huijer was captured by the TKR on 9 October and delivered to the British consulate. This incident was the beginning of many conflicts in the Surabaya area.

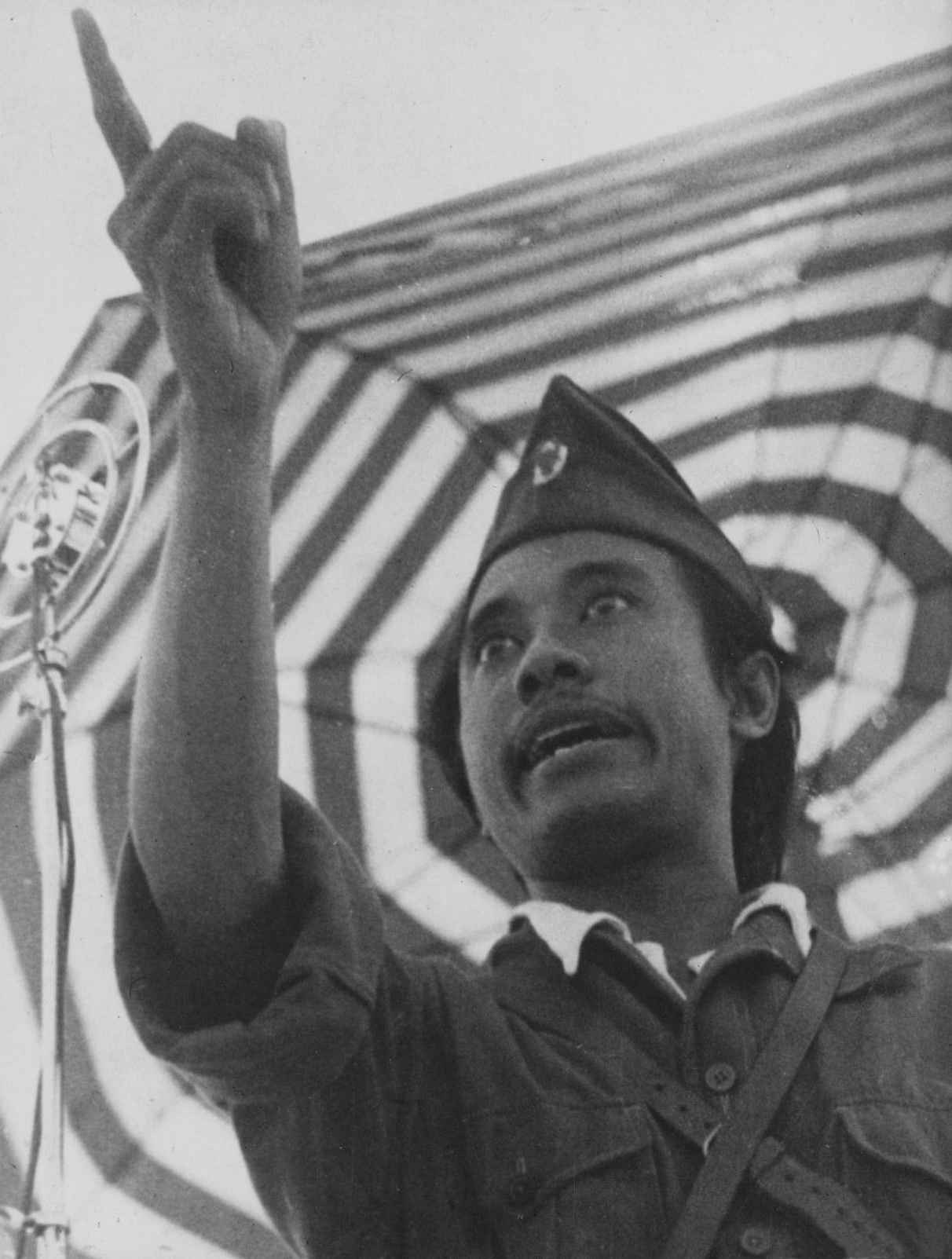
Sutomo during one of his speeches, circa 1947

In the second phase of the Bersiap (15 Sept – 14 Oct 1945), de-centralised local Pemuda groups started to organise and obtain weapons. The first Japanese soldiers were molested and the attitude against Dutch and Eurasian civilians became hostile. Indonesian propaganda also became aggressive. Atrocities committed by revolutionary forces against Indo-Europeans began. Fights between Pemuda and young Eurasians broke out, resulting in a food boycott of Indos (5 October), which in turn resulted in more violent fights. In October, razzias (raids) commenced and Eurasian males were arrested and killed. On 12 October, the Revolutionary government ordered the arrest of all Eurasian men and boys. In Surabaya, 42 Eurasians were killed in the basement of the Simpang Club and several hundred were tortured in the Kalisosok Prison in the Werfstraat. After an Ambonese prison guard informed the British about plans to poison the prisoners (9 November), they were rescued (10 November) by a Eurasian commander and a Gurkha unit. By the end of September, the first British (Indian) troops started to arrive. The British tried to remain neutral and seek cooperation with the Republican leadership. Also, the Japanese military tried not to get involved and only reacted when provoked.

The 49th Indian Infantry Brigade arrived in Surabaya by 25 October 1945 under Brigadier Mallaby. At first, the British were received well by TKR commander Mustopo and Surabaya Governor Dr Surio, and deployed in small units all over the city. TKR was instructed to support the British in securing Japanese prisoners and to save allied internees. On the morning of the 27th, an Allied airplane spread leaflets demanding that Indonesians surrender their weapons or be shot. This ultimatum from General Hawthorne, caused an uprising in Surabaya by dozens of youth militias that led to a battle on 10 November and a fatwa jihad (holy war) against westerners.

By October 1945, a fatwa jihad supporting war in Surabaya was echoed in Aceh by popular cleric Daud Beurueh. Some militia contingents from Sulawesi and other Indonesian areas became involved in the Surabaya war. A small Dutch forces would land in Kutaraja, from October to early November, but would withdraw to Medan as the atmosphere grew more hostile. The pro-Dutch ulèebalang expected the Dutch to return, and were left exposed when they did not. The Dutch would leave Aceh untouched for the rest of the Revolution, this situation would turn the civil war in Aceh decisively in the pro-Republican ulama.

The third phase (middle of October to the end of November 1945) is considered the most violent one. In Surabaya and Malang, Indonesian forces were able to disarm the Japanese military. European and Indo-European men and boys were locked up, soon followed by women and girls. (The British military subsequently decided to evacuate the 10,000 Indo-Europeans and European internees from the volatile Central Java interior). Travel for the perceived anti-revolutionary population—Christian Indonesian, Chinese Indonesian, European and Indo-European people—became impossible. The British armed forces tried to obtain control, but encountered heavy resistance, particularly in the middle of Java. Surabaya was the scene of bitter fighting.(see Battle of Surabaya)

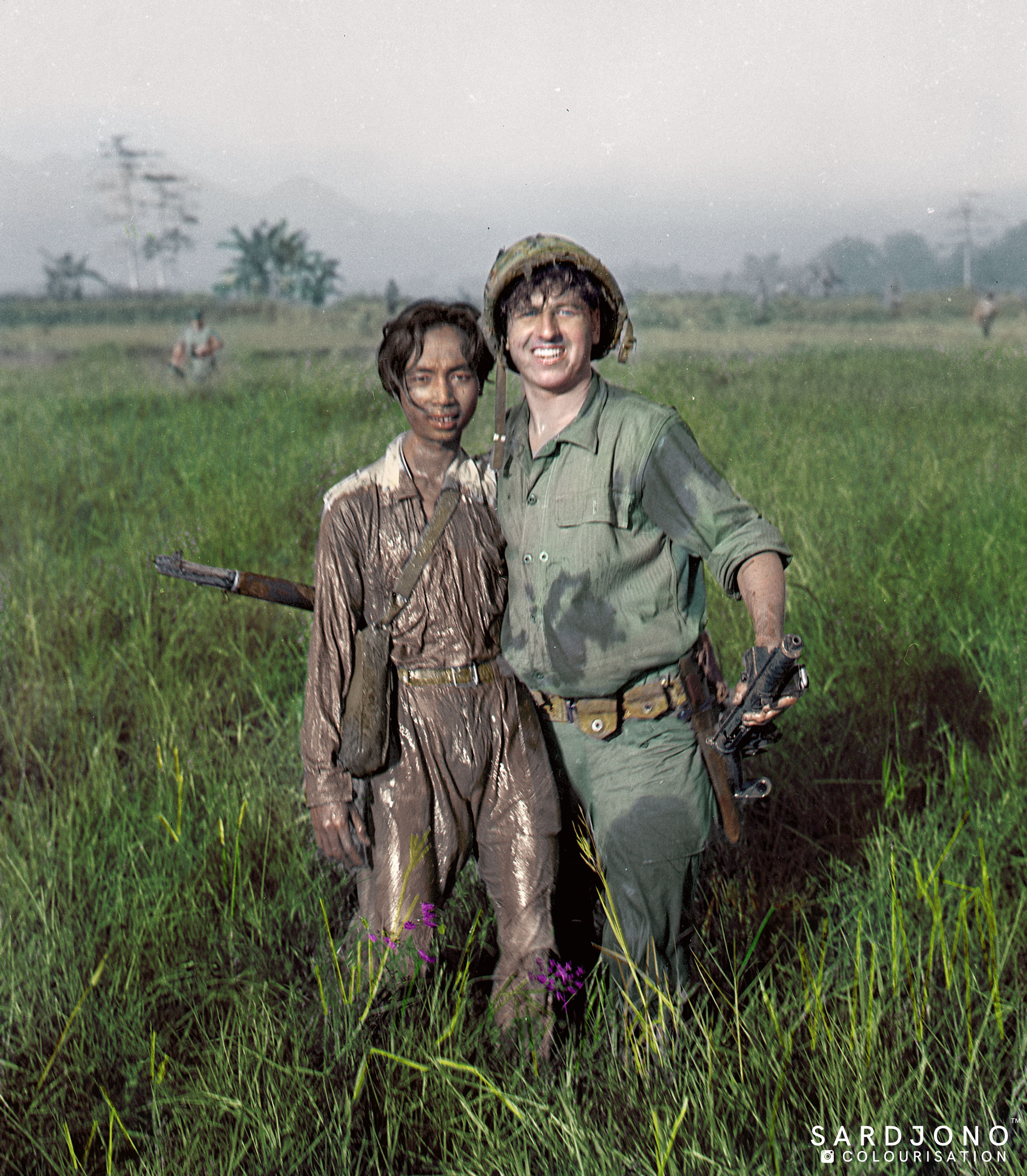
Captured Indonesian independence fighter poses for the camera in Buduran, south of Surabaya, July 1946. The person on the right is a Dutch marine wearing U.S. Marine Corps fatigues

The Republic managed to reform the TKR para-military into a formal armed force: Tentara Republik Indonesia (Army of the Republic of Indonesia) or TRI, organised by Maj.Gen. Urip Sumohardjo, an ex-KNIL major. This new organisation managed to disband most militias. However, many major militia still remained outside the TRI until a major reorganization 1947 made possible by a United Nations sponsored cease-fire before the Renville negotiations.

The fourth phase (December 1945 to December 1946) is considered the aftermath of the heaviest Bersiap fighting. In Jakarta, where hundreds of autonomous Pemuda groups existed, the last months of 1945 were, according to Cribb, a "terrifying time of regular looting, robbery, kidnapping and random murders were Europeans and Indo-Europeans disappeared even from the heart of the city, to be found floating in the kali (canals) days later". In Bandung, Republican attacks against alleged pro-Dutch civilians reached a peak in November and December, with 1,200 killed there. The alleged pro-Dutch civilians mostly included native-born Indo-European, Indo-Chinese, Christian indigenous people (e.g. Menadonese and Ambonese) and indigenous aristocracy, which made the Bersiap period a chaotic mix of civil war, religious conflict and social revolution. Other killings among supposed revolutionary groups also happened, with prominent Indonesian nationalist and minister, Oto Iskandar di Nata kidnapped and killed on 19–20 December 1945 by Laskar Hitam. Meanwhile, in Aceh, between December 1945 to March 1946, the leading ulèebalang of Aceh and their families would be imprisoned or killed, leading to dominance of pro-Republican ulama displacing the ulèebalang elites.

Throughout Java regular violence continued through to March 1946. In March 1946, departing Republican forces responded to a British ultimatum for them to leave Bandung by deliberately burning down much of the southern half of the city, in what is known as the "Bandung Sea of Fire. Indonesian commanders put much effort into organising irregular fighting units and consolidating their forces on Java. Nasution in West-Java, and Sudirman in Central Java had a hard time controlling the many different armed forces and excluding criminal forces from their ranks, but in the end they succeed. Pressure from the British compelled Dutch politicians to commence negotiations with the Republican leadership, leading to the Linggadjati Agreement, which eventually failed.

Indonesian forces began evacuating Japanese military forces and European and Eurasian civilian prisoners. In March 1946, the Royal Netherlands Army started to enter the country to restore order and peace. In July 1946, the last of the Japanese army was evacuated and all British troops were withdrawn by the end of the year, leaving the Dutch military in charge and de facto ending the Bersiap period. Java and Sumatra was now divided into Republican and Dutch controlled areas. The violence and warfare continued.

== Post-Bersiap period ==
Because the Indonesian military leadership was able to control and organise the militant revolutionary forces, the Indonesian political leadership retained overall authority and political leverage in the international arena. The civilian evacuation of Europeans and Indo-Europeans continued until the middle of the next year (May 1947) Renewed hostility and warfare continued during the struggle for Indonesian independence and lasted until, under heavy political pressure from the United States and the United Nations, the Dutch formally transferred complete sovereignty over the Dutch East Indies to the United States of Indonesia in December 1949.

The TNI was established in June 1947 by merging all existing militia with the TRI, forming a united Republican army command in the areas on Java and Sumatra that formed the de facto Republic Indonesia. The establishment of the TNI, and the disbanding of the militias, increased security in Republican-controlled areas, allowing for law and order.

Most civilian (allied internees) and Japanese prisoner evacuations from inland Java and Sumatra were done by the TRI (later the TNI after June 1947), as a result of the Linggarjati and Renville Agreements, allowing the British to return home in November 1946.

== Propaganda ==
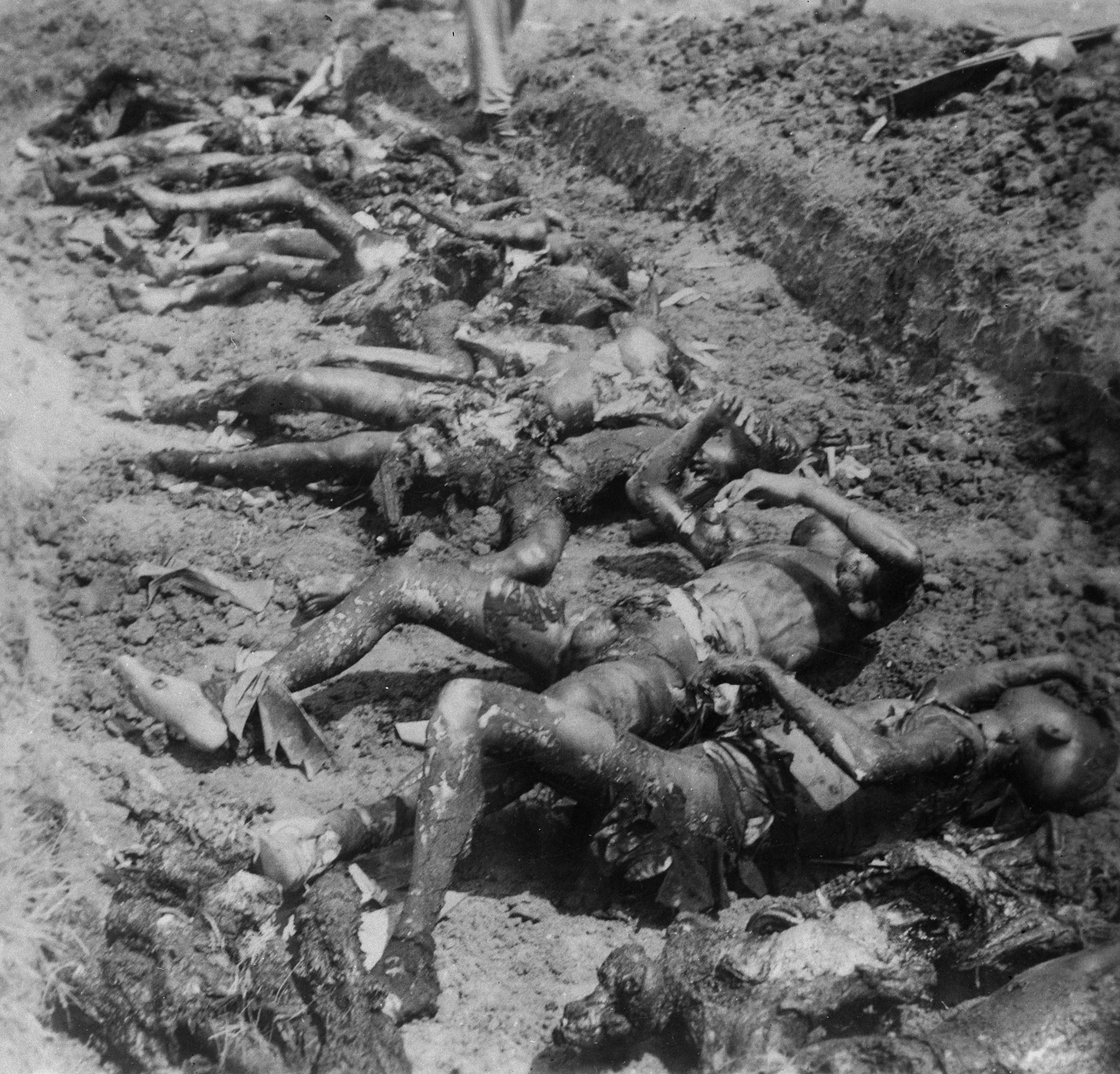
Aftermath of the Mergosono massacre in Malang, July 1947

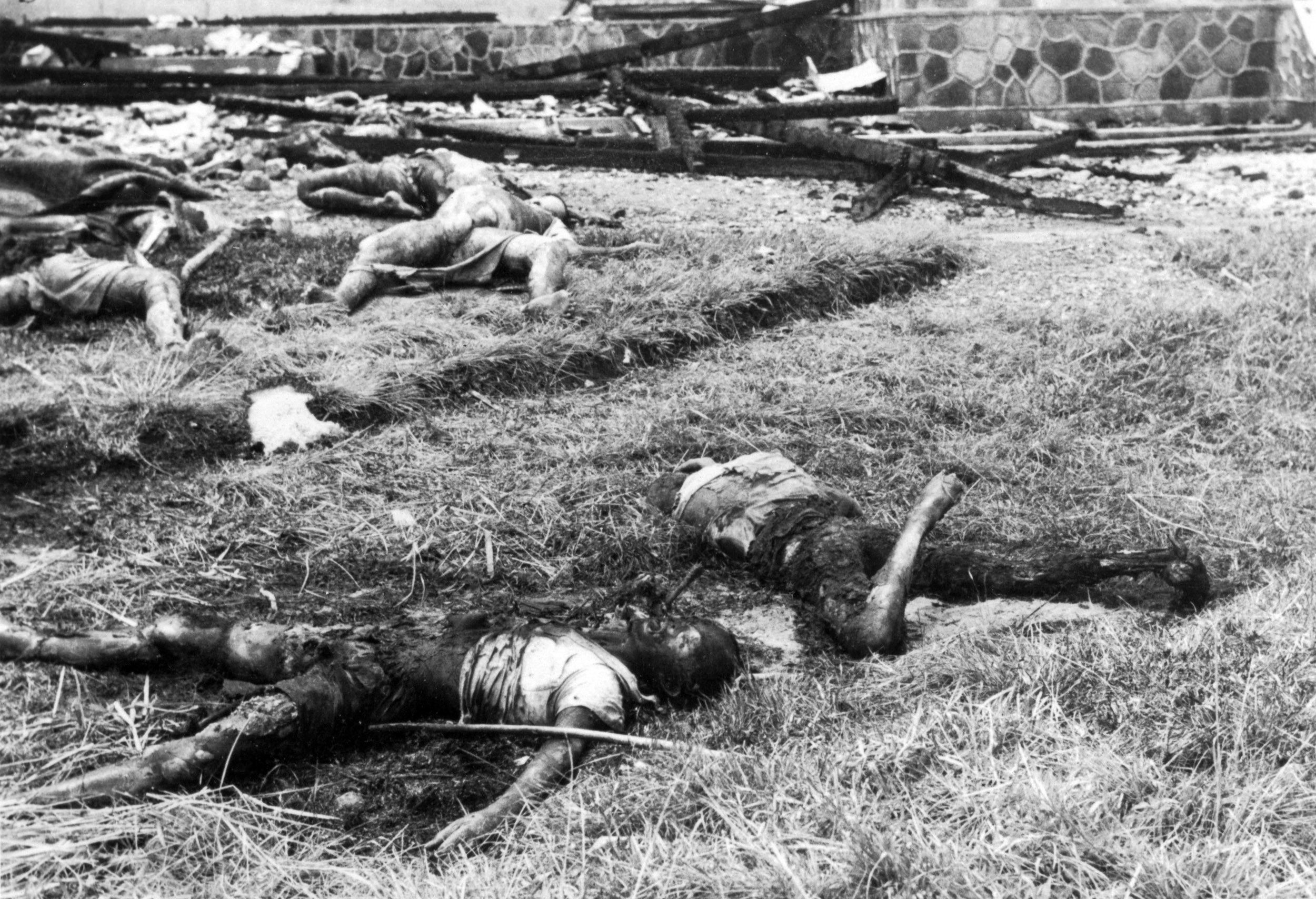
Some of the fifty-eight Indonesian civilians killed by revolutionaries, as found by Dutch soldiers in Berastagi, North Sumatra, August 1947

One of the catalysts driving the atrocities committed by Indonesian Pemuda against the native Eurasian civilian population and Ambonese was incendiary Republican propaganda. Republican propaganda during the revolution was used as a form of political warfare, by communicating loaded messages to produce emotional responses and influence the attitude of the masses, with the objective to further its political and military agenda. Effective means of mass communication were the broadcasts on republican radio stations such as 'Radio Pemberontak' and speeches during mass demonstrations. The supreme republican leader Sukarno had mastered these forms of communication. However, during the Bersiap period, the republican strategic agenda had not yet fully found a common ground and a unitary message on how to achieve its single mission of independence. Due to this paradox, republican communication often fluctuated between moderate (political) and radical (military) messages. The Republican military declaration of total war (14 October 1945) states: "When the sun sets, we the Indonesian people are in war with the Dutch." The declaration then continues clearly targeting civilian groups: "With this declaration we order all Indonesians to find their own enemy – Dutch, Indo or Ambonese."

In his speeches, the revolutionary leader, Sutomo, specifically aimed his words at the Eurasian population, verbally reducing them to bloodhounds. In Surabaya, Sutomo had a radio studio and transmitting equipment at his disposal. The first transmission was on 13 October 1945, but could only be received in Surabaya and parts of East-Java. From 16 October 1945, the radio broadcasts could be heard all over Indonesia. The next Sutomo speech was broadcast on 14 October and another on the evening of 15 October. This was the evening of 'black Monday', the day Dutch and Eurasian citizens were rounded up and killed at the Kalisosok and Bubutan prisons in Surabaya.

Torture them to death, destroy those bloodhounds of colonialism to the root. […] The immortal spirits of your ancestors demand of you: revenge, bloody revenge!

— Sutomo, Jogjakarta, 24 November 1945.

Soon in the streets of the capital, Batavia, explicit slogans appeared in graffiti on the walls: "Death to the Ambonese and Indos!" The only pro-Dutch armed forces that existed on Java were small re-grouped South Maluku KNIL units. These so-called 'Ambonese' or 'Belanda Hitam' (English: Black Dutch) as they were called by other Indonesians consequently retaliated against any provocation or attack by Pemuda. Of the millions of people in Java the Pemuda's numbers, of approximately a few thousand, were small, but in Jakarta their autonomous contra-terror operations escalated to the point where the British military leadership wanted to de-mobilise them from the city. Indonesian leaders such as Sukarno and Sjahrir attempted to call for calm, but were unable to prevent the atrocities. The small town of Depok, predominantly occupied by native Christians, was one of the first places to be looted.

The ferocious mix of social revolution, xenophobia, opportunistic crime and feral populism that resulted in the Bersiap atrocities surprised and horrified not only the British commanders, but also moderate Indonesian leaders. On reflection, the Islamicist leader Abu Hanifah who later became minister of education and ambassador admitted: "The Indonesian revolution was not totally pure." But while western-educated Indonesian leaders were deeply shaken by what they witnessed, many Indonesian accounts of the time considered the violence inevitable, and even morally neutral.

=== Our Struggle ===
October 1945 in an early reaction to the Bersiap atrocities Indonesian independence leader Soetan Sjahrir issued his famous revolutionary pamphlet Our Struggle. In it, Sjahrir strongly opposed and condemned the violence committed against fellow citizens.

Perhaps the high point of his career was the publication of his pamphlet Our Struggle. Whoever reads that pamphlet today can scarcely comprehend what it demanded in insight and courage. For it appeared at a moment when the Indonesian masses, brought to the boiling point by the Japanese occupation and civil war, sought release in racist and other hysterical outbursts. Sjahrir's pamphlet went directly against this, and many must have felt his call for chivalry, for the understanding of other ethnic groups, as a personal attack.

— Sol Tas.

Recent developments show our peoples disarray [...] particularly the murder and cruelty aimed at Indos, Ambonese, and Menadonese who in any case still are our fellow countrymen. [...] This hatred towards Indos, Ambonese, Menadonese can only be explained as a lack of national consciousness among the masses of our people. [...] Hatred against minorities and foreigners are a hidden factor in any nationalist struggle..., but a nationalist movement that lets itself be carried away by xenophobia will in the end find the whole world against itself. [...] Our strength must exist in cultivating feelings of justice and humanity. Only a nationalism that is founded in these feelings will take us further in world history.

— Sjahrir, Jakarta, October 1945.

== Guerrilla warfare ==
At first, republican propaganda such as radio speeches and mass rallies were the main tools to influence and mobilise the revolutionary masses. Indonesian military leadership was yet to establish a military agenda and had little control over the many autonomous revolutionary forces. During the Bersiap, Indonesian leaders such as generals Sudirman and Nasution began to hastily build a formal military structure and develop an Indonesian military strategy. In his book about the founding doctrines of Indonesia's Army General Nasution, who became Indonesia's foremost military intellectual, reflects on this strategy and highlights the long term negative psychological and social impact on Indonesian fighters involved in the Bersiap.

Guerrilla war is indeed destructive in nature, not only materially because it uses sabotage and scorched earth, but also what is more, it causes psychological, political and social damage. A guerrilla fighter is bred on a spirit of destruction and is not easily repatriated into the community as an ordinary citizen. The spirit of revolution, of guerrilla warfare and of scorched earth is aimed at destroying the whole existing religious, legal, socio-economic order which forms the organisation of the dominating power. How can the guerrilla accept again a legal, political and socio-economic situation since to him it has the taint of the old system? Many nations and countries continue to be chaotic years and decades after a guerrilla war overturns and rubs out the ethical, legal standards which are normally found in a society. Burning, sabotage, killing and kidnapping at the expense of the enemy have a heroic value. To have participated in guerrilla activities makes it difficult for one to adapt oneself to an ordered society, a society based on law.

— Abdul Haris Nasution in 'Fundamentals of Guerrilla Warfare', 1953.

== Atrocities ==
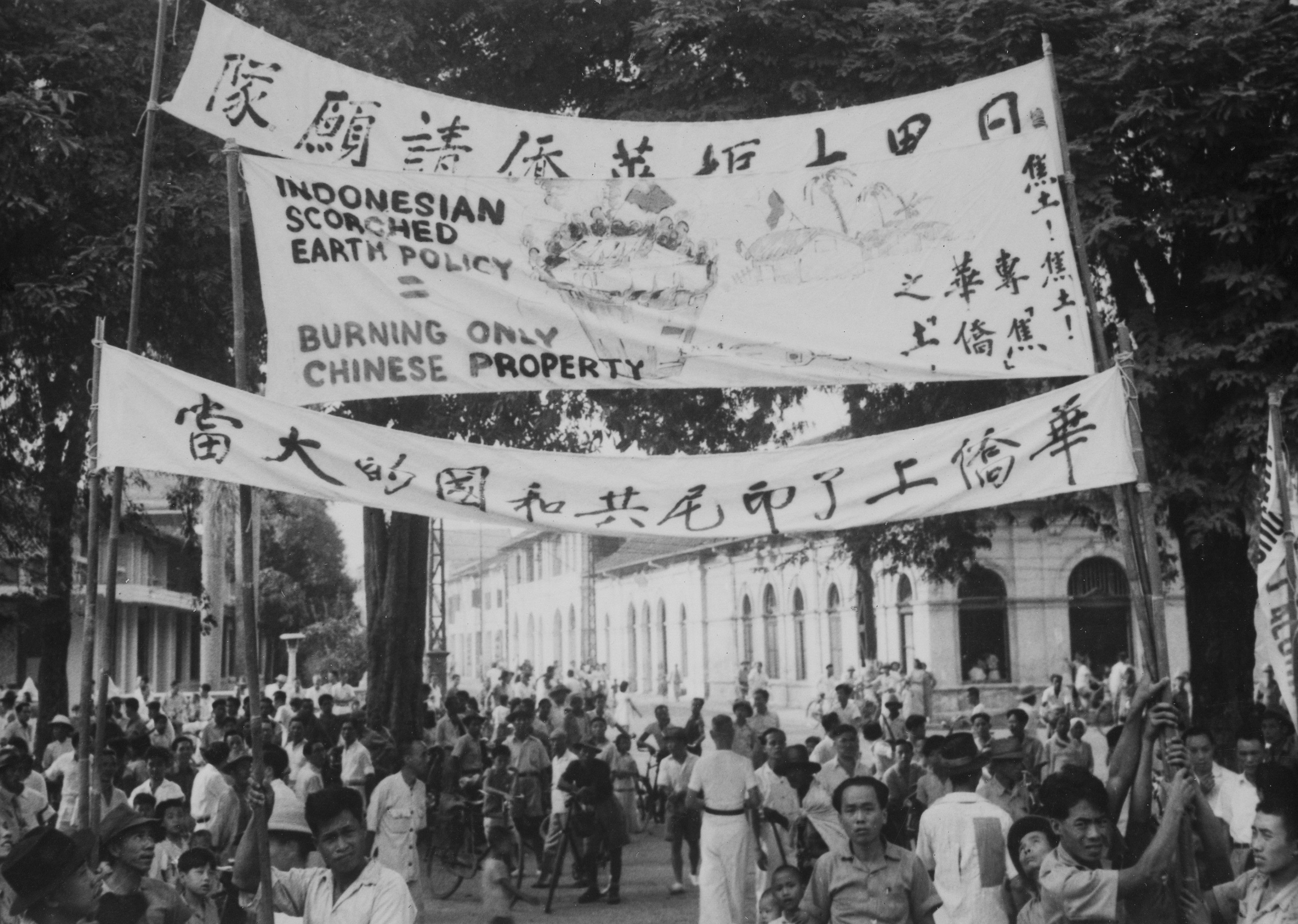
Banners with fierce indictments against the excesses of the Republic of Indonesia; often realistically illustrated. Carried along during the protest demonstration by the Chinese in Medan on 4 September 1947

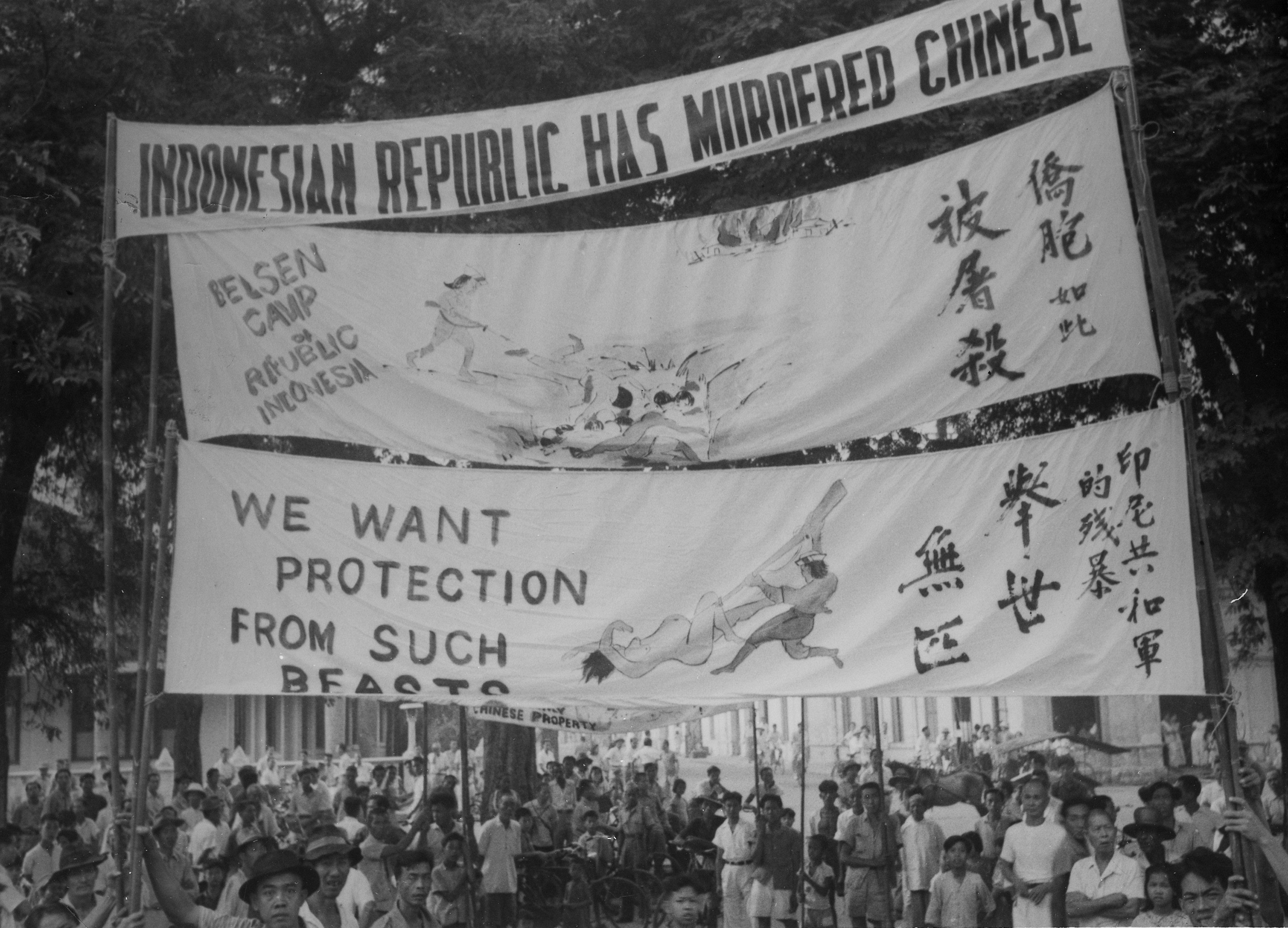
Other banners carried during the Chinese demonstration in Medan, September 1947

The Simpang Society Club Surabaya was appropriated by the Partai Rakyat Indonesia (P.R.I.) Permudas and made into the headquarters of P.R.I. Commander Sutomo, who personally supervised the summary executions of hundreds of civilians. An archived eyewitness statement of the events of 22 October 1945 states:

Before each execution Sutomo mockingly asked the crowd what should be done with this "Musuh (enemy) of the people". The crowd yelled "Bunuh!" (kill!) after which the executioner named Rustam decapitated the victim with one stroke of his sword. The victim was then left to the bloodthirst of boys 10, 11 and 12 years old. ...[who] further mutilated the body." "Women were tied to the tree in the back yard and pierced through the genitals with "bambu runcing" (bamboo spears) until they died.

On Sutomo's orders the decapitated bodies were disposed of in the sea; the women were thrown in the river.

== Casualties ==
Researchers from the NIOD Institute estimate the European and Eurasian civilian death toll of the Bersiap period between August 1945 and March 1946 at between 3,500 and 5,500, and up to 10,000 dead in extremis. The lower end of this range is based on a 1947 assessment of the Dutch authorities, who had attempted to retrieve the bodies of the victims. Several survivors of the period provided legal testimony to the attorney general's office, but due to continued revolutionary warfare, few bodies were found and few cases went to court. In addition, some 2,500 Europeans were still missing across the archipelago by the end of 1948, although that figure also included people who had disappeared during the Japanese occupation. The graves of Bersiap victims can be found in Kembang Kuning War Cemetery in Surabaya and elsewhere.

Other researchers, notably Bersiap survivor and historian Herman Th. Bussemaker, Australian historian Robert Cribb, and American historian William H. Frederick, have suggested totals of 20,000 to 30,000 Dutch and Eurasian civilian deaths between 1945 and November 1947 in their publications. These significantly higher figures appear to be based on fragmentary reports from the archives of the former Opsporingsdienst Overledenen (ODO; English: Investigation Service for the Deceased), however, which cataloged the deaths of all citizens and subjects of the Netherlands in the Dutch East Indies from 7 December 1941 onward. As a result, statistics from this agency also include military personnel and civilians who perished in the Japanese invasion and occupation, and not just Dutch citizens, but also Chinese and native Indonesian subjects.

Estimates of the number of Indonesian revolutionaries killed in the lead-up and during the Battle of Surabaya range from 6,300 to 15,000. The latter number is likely to include civilians, including 1,000 Chinese, and 1,000 Europeans and Eurasians killed by native Indonesians.

Japanese forces lost around 1,000 soldiers and the British forces registered 660 soldiers dead, mostly British Indians, with a similar number missing in action. The actual Dutch military were hardly involved, as they only began to return to Indonesia in March and April 1946.

== Research ==
Few Dutch or Indonesian historians have undertaken holistic studies about this period of the Indonesian revolution. Dutch historians have only focused on particular locations and incidents, while the NIOD Institute for War, Holocaust and Genocide Studies (NIOD) has remained idle regarding this important episode of the final phase of Dutch colonial rule. Indonesian historians mostly focus on the heroic aspects of the revolution. Witness reports from Eurasians focus on the atrocities experienced. Japanese historians show very little interest in this part of the aftermath of World War II. The most holistic studies encompassing all these elements have in fact been performed by American and English historians.

== Commemoration ==
In 1988, a national Indies Monument (Dutch: Indisch Monument) was erected in The Hague, the Netherlands, to commemorate the victims of both the Japanese occupation and Indonesian National Revolution. Originally there were 22 dedicated cemeteries in Indonesia, laid out between 1946 and 1952. Earth from these 22 war cemeteries was collected in an urn and was integrated into the Dutch National Monument on the Dam Square. At the request of the Indonesian government, the number of war cemeteries was reduced to seven. These cemeteries, Menteng Pulo and Ancol in Jakarta, Pandu in Bandung, Leuwigajah in Cimahi, Candi and Kalibanteng in Semarang, and Kembang Kuning in Surabaya, are all located on Java and are managed and maintained by the Netherlands War Graves Foundation. The bodies of European and Indo-European victims of the Bersiap atrocities that were retrieved from individual and mass graves elsewhere on Java are mostly buried in these war cemeteries.

== See also ==
- List of massacres in Indonesia
- Indonesian National Revolution
