= Lothar van Gogh =

Dutch footballer

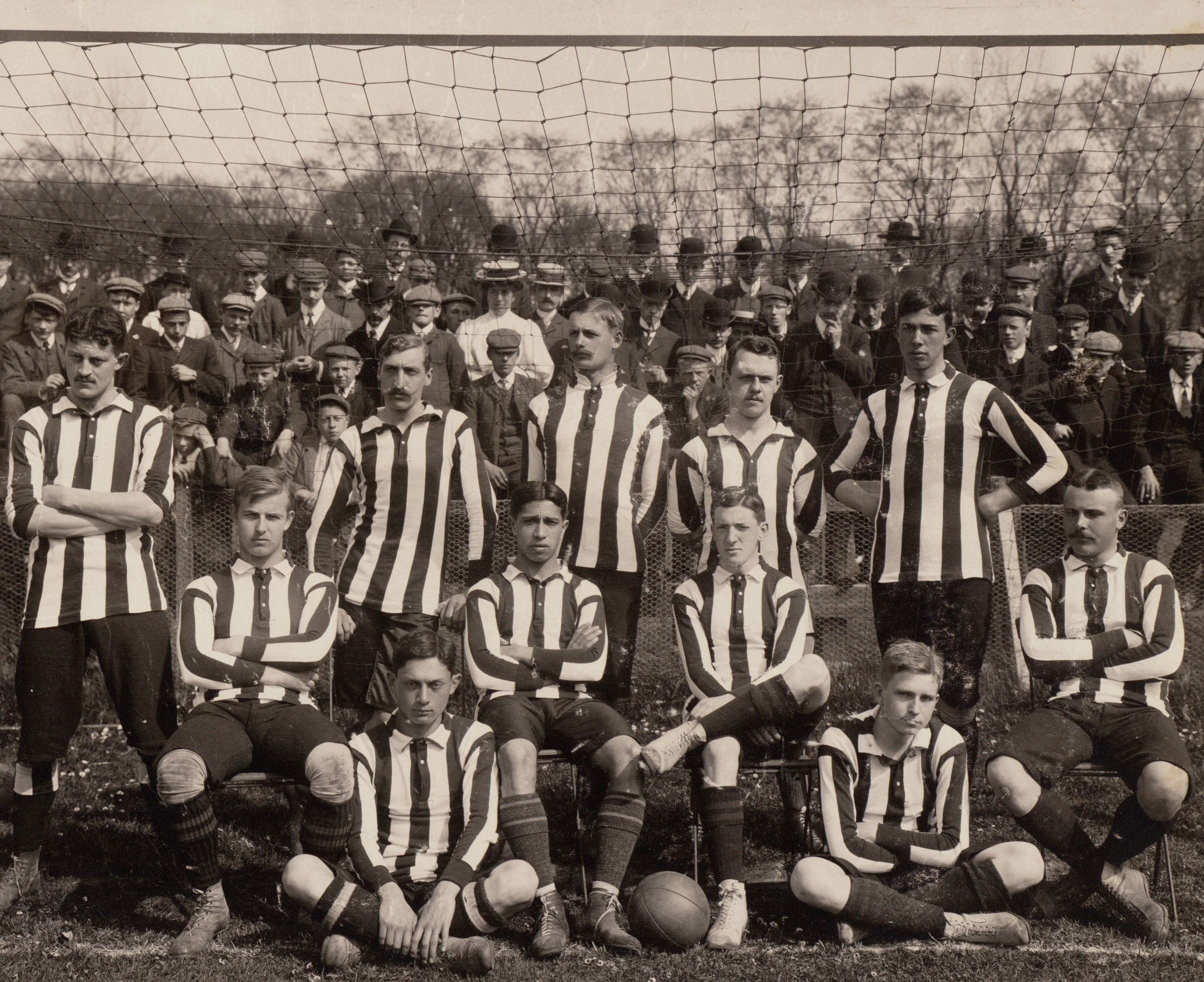
- Netherlands national football team in 1907. Van Gogh is seated right.

Personal information
- Date of birth: 7 February 1888
- Place of birth: Sukabumi, Dutch East Indies
- Date of death: 28 May 1945 (aged 57)
- Place of death: Cimahi, Dutch East Indies
- Position: Forward

Senior career*
Years	Team	Apps	(Gls)
1906–1914	HFC		

International career
1907	Netherlands	2	(2)
- * Club domestic league appearances and goals

Lothar van Gogh (7 February 1888 – 28 May 1945) was a Dutch footballer who played as a forward. He was part of the Netherlands national team, playing two matches and scoring two goals. He played his first match on 14 April 1907.

Van Gogh was the son of Jeanette Louise Vos (1854–1906) and Johannes van Gogh (1854–1913), a coffee grower on Java who was a full cousin of Vincent van Gogh.

A civilian colonial administrator in the Dutch East Indies before capture by the occupying Japanese in World War II, Van Gogh died in one of the Japanese-run internment camps in Cimahi on Java. He was buried in Dutch War Cemetery Leuwigajah in Cimahi.

== See also ==
- List of Dutch international footballers
