= Fundamentals of Guerrilla Warfare =

1953 book by Abdul Haris Nasution

- Author: Abdul Haris Nasution
- Original title: Pokok-pokok Gerilja
- Translator: Indonesian Government Printing Office (c. 1960), Djakarta
- Language: Indonesian
- Subject: Military strategy, guerrilla warfare
- Publisher: P. T. Pembimbing Masa (original)
- Publication date: 1953
- Publication place: Indonesia
- English publication date: 1965

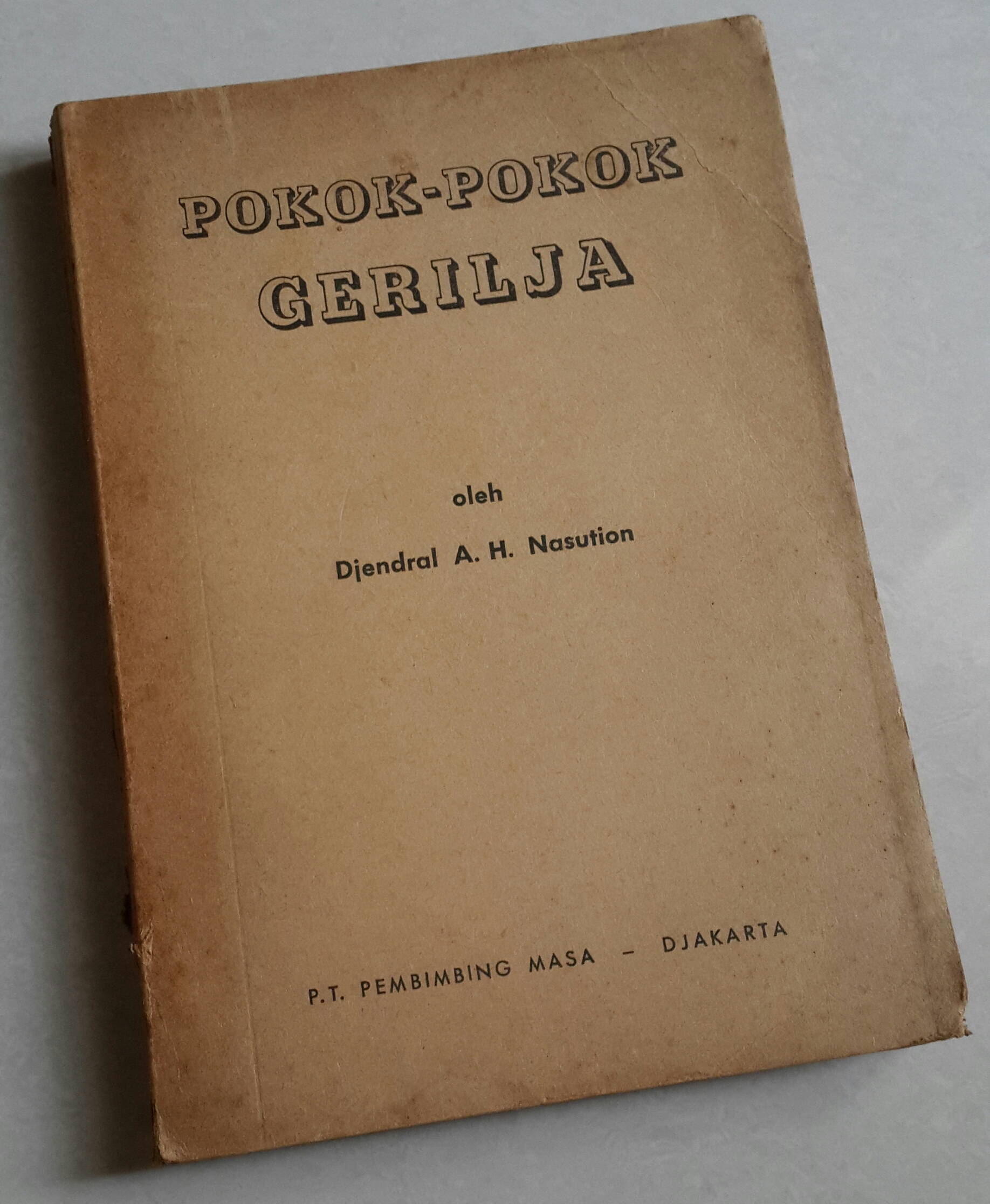
General A. H. Nasution: Fundamentals of Guerrilla Warfare (Pokok-pokok Gerilja)

Fundamentals of Guerrilla Warfare (Pokok-pokok Gerilja (original) or Pokok-pokok Gerilya; full title: Fundamentals of Guerrilla Warfare and the Indonesian Defence System, Past and Future / Indonesian: Pokok-pokok gerilya dan pertahanan Republik Indonesia dimasa jang lalu dan jang akan datang) is a book by the Indonesian general Abdul Haris Nasution (1918–2000), the "chief architect of the independence war against the Dutch", first published in 1953. It developed into one of the most studied works on guerrilla warfare, alongside the writings of Mao Zedong (1893–1976) on the same subject.

Nasution was one of the leading military strategists during the Indonesian National Revolution (1945–1949). He was the commander of the famous Siliwangi Division in West Java. The Long March Siliwangi from Central Java back to West Java in December 1948 was based on the Long March of the Chinese Red Army and Chinese Communist Party (CCP) under Mao Zedong in 1934–1935.

After his tenure as Chief of Staff of the Army, general Nasution authored this book, which summarized his practical experiences in guerrilla warfare. It was based on his own involvement in combat and in organizing resistance during the revolution.

The work sets out principles of guerrilla warfare, including the organization of small, mobile units, the use of terrain and the population, and the combination of military and political aspects in resisting a superior power. It was received in Indonesia and beyond as an important textbook on asymmetric warfare. It has occasionally been claimed that it influenced North Vietnam’s strategy in the Vietnam War. However, historical research indicates that Vietnamese strategy was primarily based on the writings of Mao Zedong.

According to the German historian Gerhard Wiechmann, Nasution’s analysis is remarkable, as he saw the problems of guerrilla warfare as a form of “unbounded” war that, once begun, was difficult to “contain” again. He also pointed to the danger faced by young nation-states such as Indonesia if great powers attempted to destabilize them by creating or supporting separatist movements—as Indonesia itself experienced in the late 1950s through covert U.S. paramilitary operations.

== See also ==
- On Guerrilla Warfare (Mao Zedong book)
- Long March Siliwangi (Indonesian)

== Bibliography ==
- Abdul Haris Nasution: Pokok-pokok Gerilja. P. T. Pembimbing Masa, Djakarta 1953
- Indonesian Government Printing Office (transl.): Fundamentals of Guerrilla Warfare. Jakarta, c. 1960
- Abdul Haris Nasution: Fundamentals of Guerrilla Warfare. Introduction by Otto Heilbrunn. Praeger, New York 1965 (other editions: Donald Moore Books, Singapore, and Pall Mall Press, London, both also 1965)
- (German translation) Abdul Haris Nasution: Der Guerillakrieg. Grundlagen der Guerillakriegführung aus der Sicht des indonesischen Verteidigungssystems in Vergangenheit und Zukunft. Köln 1961
