= Mergosono massacre =

1947 anti-Chinese massacre in Indonesia

- Part of the Bersiap period of the Indonesian National Revolution
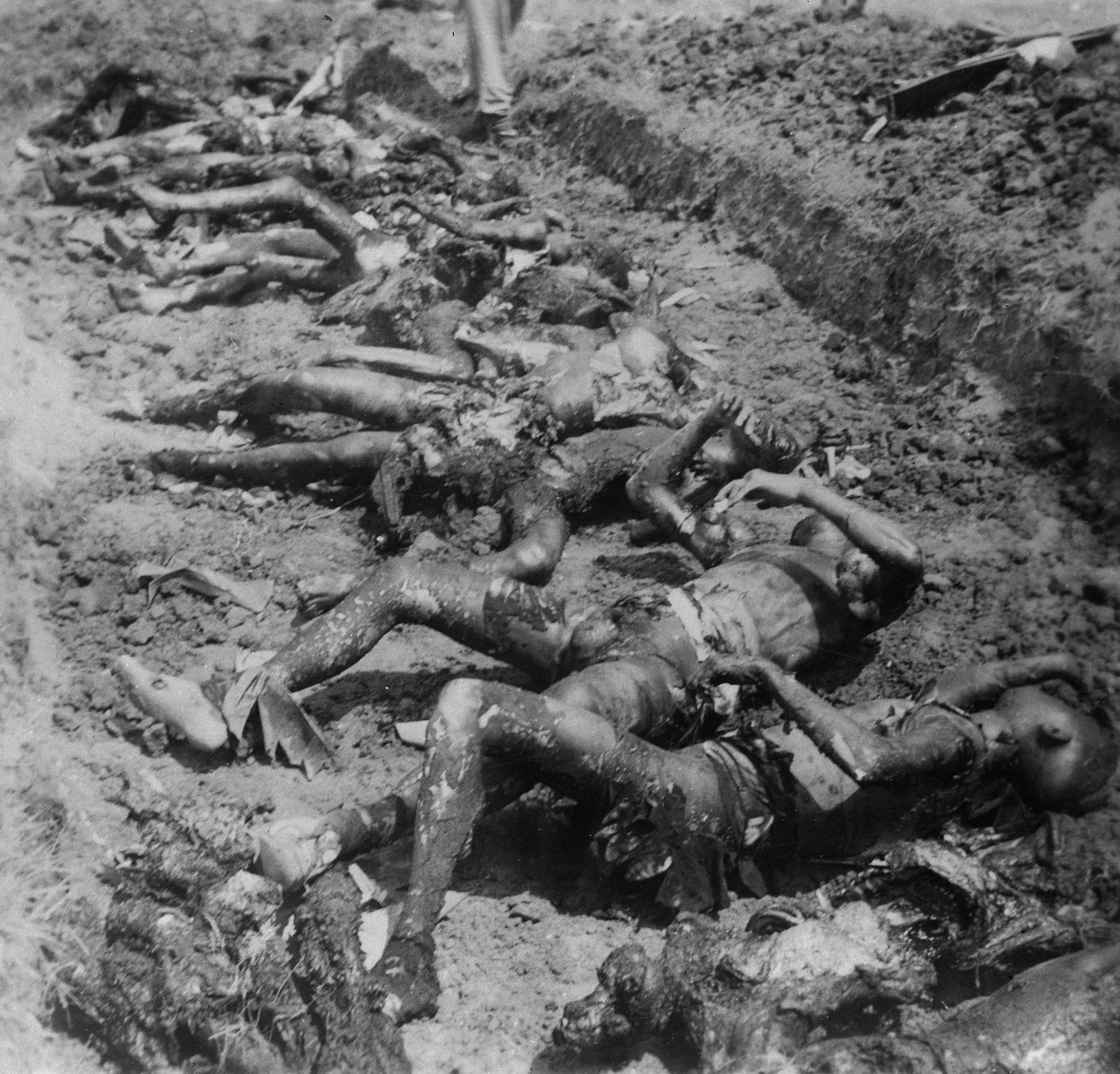
- Location: Malang, East Java, Dutch East Indies
- Date: 31 July 1947
- Attack type: massacre
- Deaths: 30
- Victim: Chinese community of Mergosono
- Perpetrator: Indonesian revolutionaries

The Mergosono massacre (Indonesian: Pembantaian Mergosono) of 31 July 1947 was committed by Indonesian revolutionaries against members of the Chinese community of Mergosono in Malang, East Java during the Bersiap period of the Indonesian National Revolution. Suspected of espionage for the Dutch colonial authorities, 30 Chinese men and women were rounded up, tortured, and burned, before being buried at a former cannery. The bodies were exhumed and reburied in a mass grave on 3 August the same year.

== The victims ==
The identities of 24 victims were provided by the local Chinese general association (Chung Hua Tsung Hui). The other six victims remain unknown.

1. Sie Bian Kiet (football player, popularly known as Freddy Sie)
2. Sie Bian Ten
3. Tan Soen Seng
4. Tan Teng San
5. unnamed wife of Tan Teng San
6. Koo Pan Tjo
7. Kwee Giok Tjhoen
8. Oen Nam Tjing
9. Koo Siam Tjo
10. Kwee Keh Tien
11. Kwee Lian Sie
12. unnamed wife of Kwee Lian Sie
13. Nie Swan Hwie
14. Nyonya Kwee Swan Hwie
15. Tan Ting Siang
16. Yap Tian Seng
17. Yap Kong Ing
18. Tan Thing Lien
19. Tan Siang Soen
20. Yap Khik Hien
21. Yap Tie Wan
22. Go Siong Kie
23. Lay Tjoen Hien
24. Go Yauw Khing

== See also ==
- Bersiap
- Discrimination against Chinese Indonesians
