= Looting of Depok =

Part of the Indonesian National Revolution in 1945

- Part of the Indonesian National Revolution
- Native name: Gedoran Dèpok
- Location: Depok, West Java, Indonesia
- Date: 9–13 October 1945
- Attack type: Mass looting
- Deaths: 10–15 civilians killed

The looting of Depok (Betawi: Gedoran Dèpok) during the Bersiap period of the Indonesian National Revolution took part between 9 and 13 October 1945. Thousands of looters entered the town of Depok and looted its European and Indo community, before they were removed from the city by the People's Security Agency.

== Background ==
The town of Depok, south of Batavia, was established as a plantation in the late 18th century and was initially inhabited by enslaved plantation workers who converted to Christianity. By the twentieth century, the descendants of these workers were perceived by other native Indonesians as the "Depok Dutch" (Belanda Depok) and was seen to have pro-colonial sympathies, and they received legal and economic privileges from the colonial government. Religious differences also resulted in the Belanda Depok group tending to avoid intermarriage with other native Indonesians. Depok was also heavily inhabited by Europeans and mixed-descent Indo people. The relatively well-off living standards of the community during the Japanese occupation of the Dutch East Indies (due to large agricultural land availability) resulted in further resentment against the Depok community.

In the first month after the proclamation of Indonesian independence on 17 August 1945, life in Depok continued largely normally, until the arrival of Allied forces in Batavia (renamed Jakarta) in mid-September resulted in the movement of Republican authorities and Indonesian nationalist militias to its outskirts, including Depok. Tensions quickly built up between the Depok community and nationalist militias which now operated in close proximity.

== Looting ==
By 9 October, several groups of militiamen marched on Depok and looted five houses, with their residents being forced to flee. Official Republican security forces were unable to stop the militias, and the homeowners returned the same day to their belongings ransacked. More looting occurred on 10 October against various shops in a nearby neighborhood. No injuries or deaths were reported from these two incidents. A Republican youth leader based in Depok, Margonda, attempted to mediate between the Belanda Depok community and the militia groups to prevent further violence to no avail.

In the morning of 11 October, however, large groups of militiamen numbering between 2,000 and 4,000 spontaneously converged on Depok. The groups began large-scale looting of the homes of the Belanda Depok community identified as Dutch supporters. Many residents were arrested, or killed when they attempted to resist the looters. Public facilities and religious buildings were also attacked. Around 1,050 women and children captured by the looters were detained at a government building, while around 300 men were detained separately. Following negotiations with local Republican authorities and the Indonesian Red Cross, food was provided to the women and children detainees. The looting continued until 13 October, with the number of civilians killed reported as either 10 or 15.

== Aftermath ==
The prisoners would be freed following an Allied military operation on 17 October which largely pushed the militias out of Depok. The around 2,000 displaced residents of Depok, with their homes burned down, largely resettled in Jakarta or nearby Bogor. Fighting between Dutch and Indonesian forces in Depok continued until mid-1946, though by June 1946 the displaced residents had begun returning and most were back by mid-1947.

Some survivors who were displaced would later describe the affair as a genocide. The looting left a deep cultural trauma on Depok's Christian communities (especially those residing within the Depok Lama neighborhood of the modern city), who tended to avoid political activities up until the present day.
