= Candi War Cemetery =

Dutch war cemetery in Semarang, Indonesia

Dutch Field of Honor Candi
- Nederlands Ereveld Candi; Makam Kehormatan Belanda di Candi
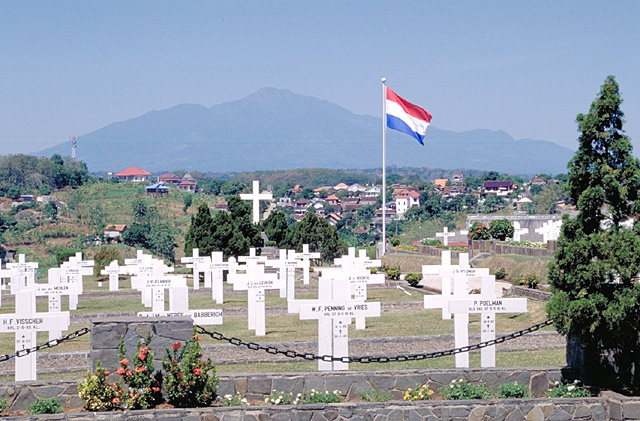
- Candi War Cemetery
- Interactive map of Dutch Field of Honor Candi

Details
- Location: Semarang, Central Java
- Country: Indonesia
- Coordinates: 7°00′23″S 110°24′31″E
- Type: War cemetery
- Owned by: Netherlands War Graves Foundation
- No. of graves: Over 1,000

Candi War Cemetery, also Dutch Field of Honor Candi (Dutch: Nederlands Ereveld Candi, Indonesian: Makam Kehormatan Belanda di Candi), is a war cemetery in the hills of Semarang, Central Java in Indonesia. Candi is one of two Dutch war cemeteries in Semarang, the other being Kalibanteng War Cemetery.

The cemetery was constructed by soldiers from the T-Brigade of the Royal Netherlands Army who came ashore in Java on 12 March 1946, during the Indonesian National Revolution. Only Dutch servicemen are buried in this cemetery, resting in more than 1,000 graves. Initially, only war dead of the revolution incurred in Central Java were buried at Candi, but they were soon joined by Dutch casualties of the preceding Pacific War.
