= Dirk Reinhard Adelbert van Langen =

Commander in Dutch army during Indonesian National Revolution

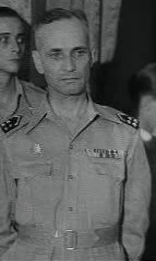
- Born: 17 May 1898; Magelang, Dutch East Indies
- Died: 20 January 1983 (aged 84); Doorn, the Netherlands
- Relatives: Hans Goedkoop (grandson)
- Military career
- Allegiance: Netherlands
- Branch: Royal Netherlands Army; Royal Netherlands East Indies Army
- Service years: 1916–1950
- Rank: Major general
- Commands: Royal Netherlands East Indies Army; T-Brigade
- Conflicts: World War II; Indonesian National Revolution
- Awards: Mobilisation war Cross 1940; Knight in the Order of the Dutch Lion; Officer of the Order of Orange Nassau with Swords; Officer's Cross; Bronze Lion; The Decoration for Order and Peace with buckles 1945/1946/1947/1948/1949

Major general Dirk Reinhard Adelbert "Rein" van Langen (17 May 1898 – 20 January 1983) was a member of the chief of staff of the Royal Netherlands East Indies Army (KNIL), the territorial commander of East Java, and commander of the T-Brigade of the Royal Netherlands Army from 1946 to 1949, during the Indonesian National Revolution.

== Early career ==
After attending the Royal Military Academy in Breda, the Netherlands, Van Langen was promoted from cadet-ensign to cadet-sergeant in October 1918. In July 1919 he was promoted to second lieutenant and departed on 13 September for the Dutch East Indies. Upon arrival, he was promoted to first lieutenant; he was placed in the sixteenth battalion in Meester Cornelis. He married on 17 June 1924 to Annie Bartelds (daughter of KNIL colonel Bartelds), with whom he had engaged in 1922. He was transferred to the garrison battalion of Palembang and Jambi in April 1927 and transferred to the first depot battalion in Bandung. On 8 March 1928, Van Langen did the examination for the Higher War College in Bandung. He met the requirements and was admitted to get expert study in The Hague. As of 1 November 1928, he was seconded for a period of three years at the Higher War College. As of 3 August 1930, he was promoted to captain and was attached in September of that year to the regiment cyclists.

On 30 September 1931, he returned to the Dutch East Indies and was posted at the headquarters of the general staff Department Bandung. In March 1932, he was relocated to the garrison battalion in the South and Eastern Division of Borneo and seconded to Balikpapan (as detachment commander) in October 1934 again returned to the Department Bandung.

He was placed in the general staff in May 1936 and made part of the committee in charge of conducting the ranking research for admission to the Royal Military Academy. As of 30 March 1940, Van Langen was promoted to major and during the Second World War he was in German captivity, imprisoned in Juliusburg, Colditz Castle, Stanislau and Neubrandenburg. In late May 1945, he returned to the Netherlands.

== Indonesian War of Independence ==
After the war, he returned to the Dutch East Indies as a lieutenant colonel, where he was placed on the staff of Admiral Conrad Helfrich and charged with the deployment of the Dutch troops. In February 1946 he went to Malacca and was appointed from 1 June 1946 to territorial commander of Central Java, Yogyakarta, and Surakarta.

Around this time he tried to get in contact with the Indonesian colonel Soenarto in Semarang. Van Langen wrote in a communiqué in Semarang's Serbian magazine The Middle that in order to avoid unnecessary bloodshed he had to determine a demarcation line between the Dutch and Indonesian-controlled territories.

Van Langen was, from 16 February 1946, the commander of the T-Brigade (the 'Tiger Brigade').

=== Capture of Yogyakarta ===
After learning of the surprise attack, Indonesian military commander General Sudirman broadcast Perintah Kilat ('Quick Command') via radios. He also requested Sukarno and other leaders to evacuate from Yogya, and join his guerrilla army. After a cabinet meeting, they refused and decided to stay in Yogyakarta, and keep communicating with the United Nations and UNCI envoys. Sukarno also announced the plan of an 'emergency government' in Sumatra, in the event something happened to the Indonesian leadership in Yogyakarta. Meanwhile, 2,600 fully armed Dutch troops (infantry and paratroopers) led by Colonel van Langen had gathered in Maguwo, ready to capture Yogyakarta. On the same day most of Yogyakarta fell into the Dutch with key targets like the air force and chief-of-staff headquarters razed by a combination of the Indonesian scorched earth policy and Dutch bombing. Indonesian President Sukarno, Vice President Mohammad Hatta, and former Prime Minister Sutan Sjahrir were seized by the Dutch and subsequently exiled to Bangka. They allowed themselves to be captured, hoping it would outrage international supporters, however this action was later criticized among Indonesian military circles which regarded it as an act of cowardice by the political leadership. Sultan Hamengkubuwono IX stayed at his palace in Yogyakarta and did not leave during the entire occupation. The Sultan himself refused to cooperate with the Dutch administration and rejected mediation attempts by the pro-Dutch Sultan Syarif Hamid II.

By 20 December, all remaining republican troops in Yogya had been withdrawn. All parts of Indonesia except Aceh and some cantons in Sumatra fell under Dutch control. Sudirman, who was suffering from tuberculosis, led the guerrillas from his sickbed. General Abdul Haris Nasution, military commander of Java territories, declared a military government in Java and initiated a new guerrilla tactic called Pertahanan Keamanan Rakyat Semesta ('Nation in Arms'), transforming the Javanese countryside into a guerrilla front with civilian support. In July 1949, Van Langen was promoted to major general in the Netherlands. After he returned to the Dutch East Indies he was present in the function of the military commander of Yogya during the withdrawal of the Dutch troops from the Dutch East Indies, including in the southwestern part of Yogyakarta.

== Later career ==
Van Langen was appointed in July 1949 as Chief General Staff, succeeding and participating in the Round Table Conference in The Hague and Amsterdam. He left the Dutch East Indies together with General D.C. Buurman van Vreeden, after visiting Sukarno, July 1950, as the last Dutch commander.

By Royal Decree of November 1952, Van Langen was appointed to Superintendent of the Fire Department. He was also active as general counsel of the Veterans Legion Netherlands and honorary chairman of the Action Committee for the St. Elisabeth Hospital in Semarang, which in 1952 was 25 years. Van Langen obtained from August 16, 1961, honorable discharge from his position as superintendent of the Fire Department. He was succeeded in his post by Colonel C. ter Poorten. He settled in Doorn and died there on 20 January 1983.

== Awards ==
By Royal Decree of 27 August 1947, he was appointed Officer of the Order of Orange Nassau with Swords. By Royal Decree of 9 December 1949, Van Langen endowed with the Bronze Lion (with the same decision also received Lieutenant Colonel Musch the Bronze Lion). He was appointed by Royal Decree of July 1950 Knight in the Order of the Dutch Lion.

== Personal ==
His grandson Hans Goedkoop is historian, literary critic, and television presenter in the Netherlands.
