= Mariniersbrigade =

Brigade set up by Dutch government in exile

The Mariniersbrigade (English: Marine Brigade) was a marine unit set up by the Dutch government-in-exile during World War II, which existed between 1943 and 1949. It was formed as part of the Dutch contribution to the Allied war effort against Japan and more particularly for the liberation of the Dutch East Indies. The driving force behind its creation was marine colonel M. R. de Bruyne. The Mariniersbrigade became an independently operating unit with a strength of approximately 5,000 men. Capable of amphibious landings, the unit had a core of three infantry battalions, and was further equipped with landing craft, artillery and tanks.

== Creation ==
In 1943, a so-called 'core cadre group' was formed, which consisted of 175 members of the Netherlands Marine Corps mainly from Curaçao, and other career soldiers who had remained out of enemy hands. More than a hundred members of the core cadre group gained combat experience during deployment with the Princess Irene Brigade, which had been sent to mainland Europe, including the southern Netherlands, after the invasion of Normandy. The Mariniersbrigade was later brought up to strength with war volunteers from the liberated Netherlands. Organization and armaments followed American designs. Most marines received their training in the United States, most notably at Camp Lejeune, a major United States Marine Corps (USMC) training center in North Carolina. From there, many marines were sent to Camp Davis, in the same state, to be trained in various specialties within the brigade. In the latter camp, the marines were also assigned to their eventual battalions and companies.

Commandant of the USMC general Thomas Holcomb was enthusiastic about the Dutch plan to establish a marine unit and successfully lobbied other US military brass to this end. Apparently, an important motive of his was an experience he had while serving as a young officer with the American guard of the Beijing Legation Quarter. In nightlife brawls there, US Marines were outnumbered by army soldiers of the other foreign powers. They were therefore happy when between 1913 and 1923 they were reinforced by fellow marines from the Netherlands who were assigned to protect the Dutch mission in Beijing. That created a bond that twenty years later would open doors that would otherwise have remained shut.

== In Indonesia ==
When Japan was defeated in August 1945 and Sukarno and Mohammad Hatta proclaimed Indonesian independence, a new situation arose. It soon became clear that, instead of fighting against Japan, the brigade would be used to restore pre-WW2 Dutch rule in the East Indies and maintain it -- which entail destroying independent Republican government and install more amenable government to Dutch. A confrontation with the armed forces of the Indonesian nationalists would then be inevitable. The Americans, who had no interest in restoring the old colonial order, withdrew all facilities for the Dutch marines. Due to a lack of shipping capacity – the Netherlands had lent its merchant fleet to the Allies – it would take several months before the approximately 4,000 marines in the United States could ship to the Indonesia.

At the end of 1945, the troop ship Noordam arrived in Indonesian waters with 2,000 marines on board. However, the British, who exercised military authority over Indonesia, refused to admit Dutch troops. Nevertheless, one battalion managed to disembark near Batavia. The remaining marines were rerouted to Malacca. Later on, a second echelon with a strength of more than 2,000 men, which had been brought in by the troopship Bloemfontein, arrived. In March 1946, Dutch troops were finally allowed into Indonesia. A month later, the merchant vessel Boissevain arrived from the Netherlands with another 800 marines on board. The marines were stationed in the naval port of Surabaya in East Java, the brigade's future area of operations. Together with units of the army they formed the so-called 'A-division'.

== Security Service ==
The Veiligheidsdienst Mariniersbrigade (VDMB; English: Security Service of the Marine Brigade) reported directly to the commander of the brigade via the head of the intelligence section, one of the staff officers at the headquarters of the Mariniersbrigade in Surabaya. In the field, the VDMB reported to the respective head of intelligence in the area of operations. The service consisted of Dutch Indonesians, who, because they spoke the language of the country, maintained contact with the native chiefs. They were deployed to outposts where they tried to gather data, which proved to be a very dangerous task. At night, the members of the WDMB joined on patrols, so they could interrogate prisoners of war directly. In addition, it was their task to win the hearts and minds of the locals.

One of the most notable figures of the VDMB was the Surabaya-born G. N. Hakkenberg. A VDMB detachment usually consisted of three or four marines, both volunteers and conscripts, led by a corporal, who was temporarily promoted to sergeant. Such a detachment was supplemented by a number of civilians, the employees of special services, who usually acted as interrogators. Opponents of the VDMB in the field were regulars of the Indonesian military (TNI), pro-Republican militias, Darul Islam (Indonesia) insurgent (which seceded from central Republican government after Renville Agreement, and even common criminals.

== Combat history ==
=== Indonesian National Revolution ===
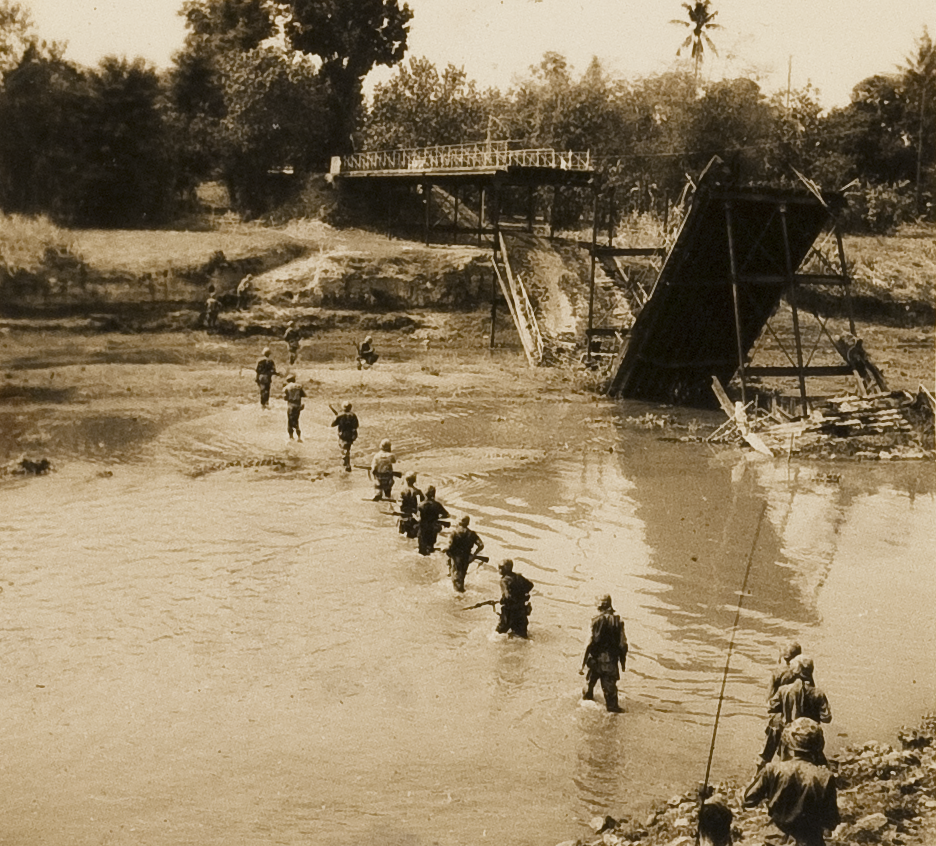
Marines advancing on Java.

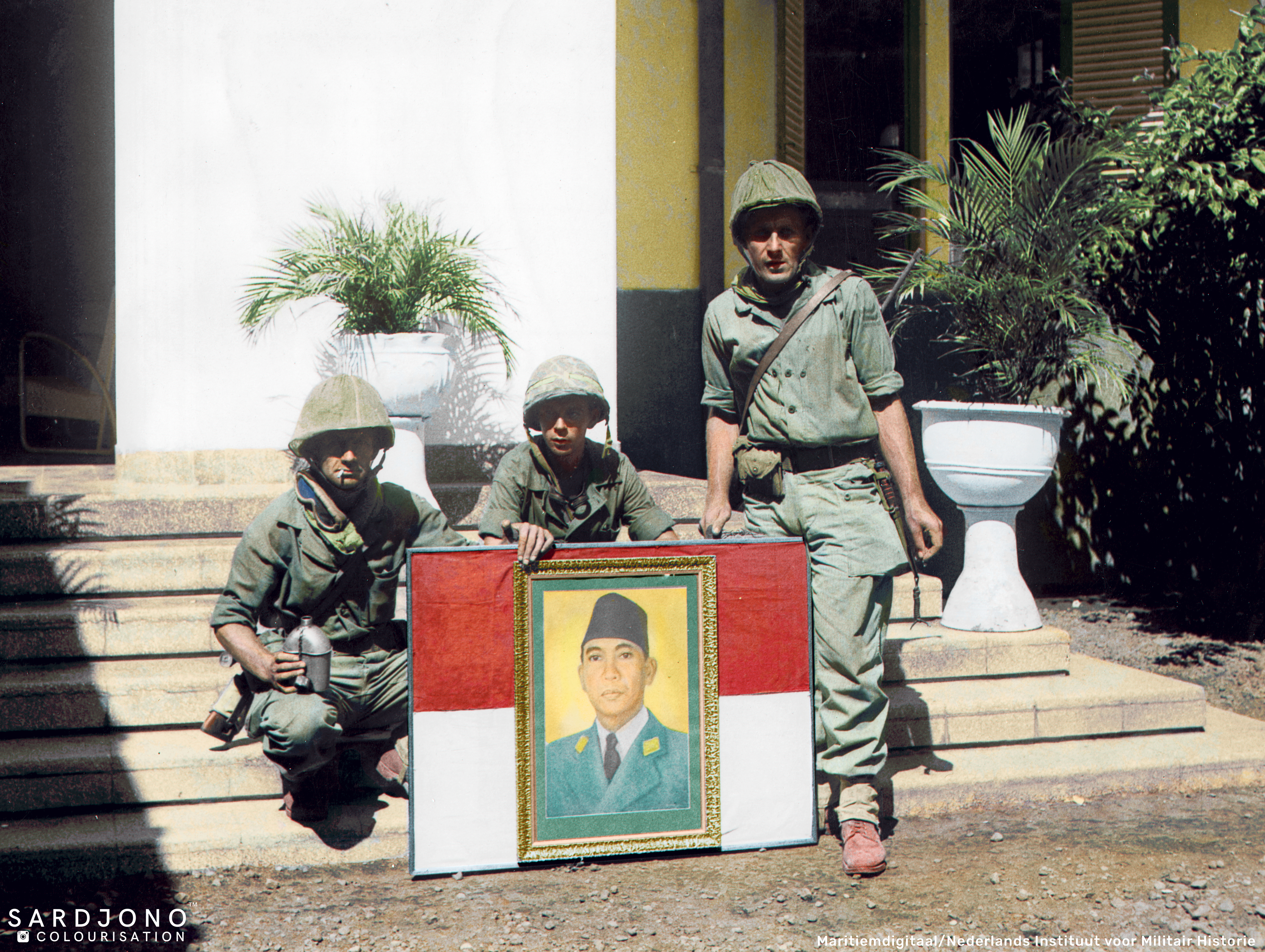
Marines during Operation Product in Lumajang Regency.

The occupation of Surabaya by the British in September 1945 was accompanied by fierce resistance from Indonesian nationalists. The Battle of Surabaya had resulted in many casualties on both sides. When the Dutch troops took over the positions from the British, they immediately faced the threat of an Indonesian attack on the city. The marines responded with search and destroy operations in the area. Gradually, the Surabaya perimeter was expanded, but skirmishes between the two sides continued to be the order of the day.

In mid-1947, Operation Product, the first Dutch police action, began. The troops in Surabaya were ordered to expel the nationalists (TNI and related forces) from most of East Java and occupy the area. The attack was launched in several places. The marines made an amphibious landing at two places on the Javanese east coast, at Pasir Putih and at Meneng Bay. At the same time, marine and army units broke through the perimeter of the Surabaya enclave. After heavy fighting, the Dutch objectives were achieved.

After the military operation, an agreement was brokered between the warring parties and the Indonesian forces withdrew from the occupied territory. But over time, they secretly returned, leading to increased guerrilla activity. The strength of the Dutch troops proved insufficient to keep the conquered area under control.

In the meantime, the personnel composition of the Mariniersbrigade had changed radically. In the course of 1948, most war volunteers were demobilized and partly replaced by inexperienced conscripted marines from the Netherlands. The strength of the Mariniersbrigade then decreased to around 4,000 men.

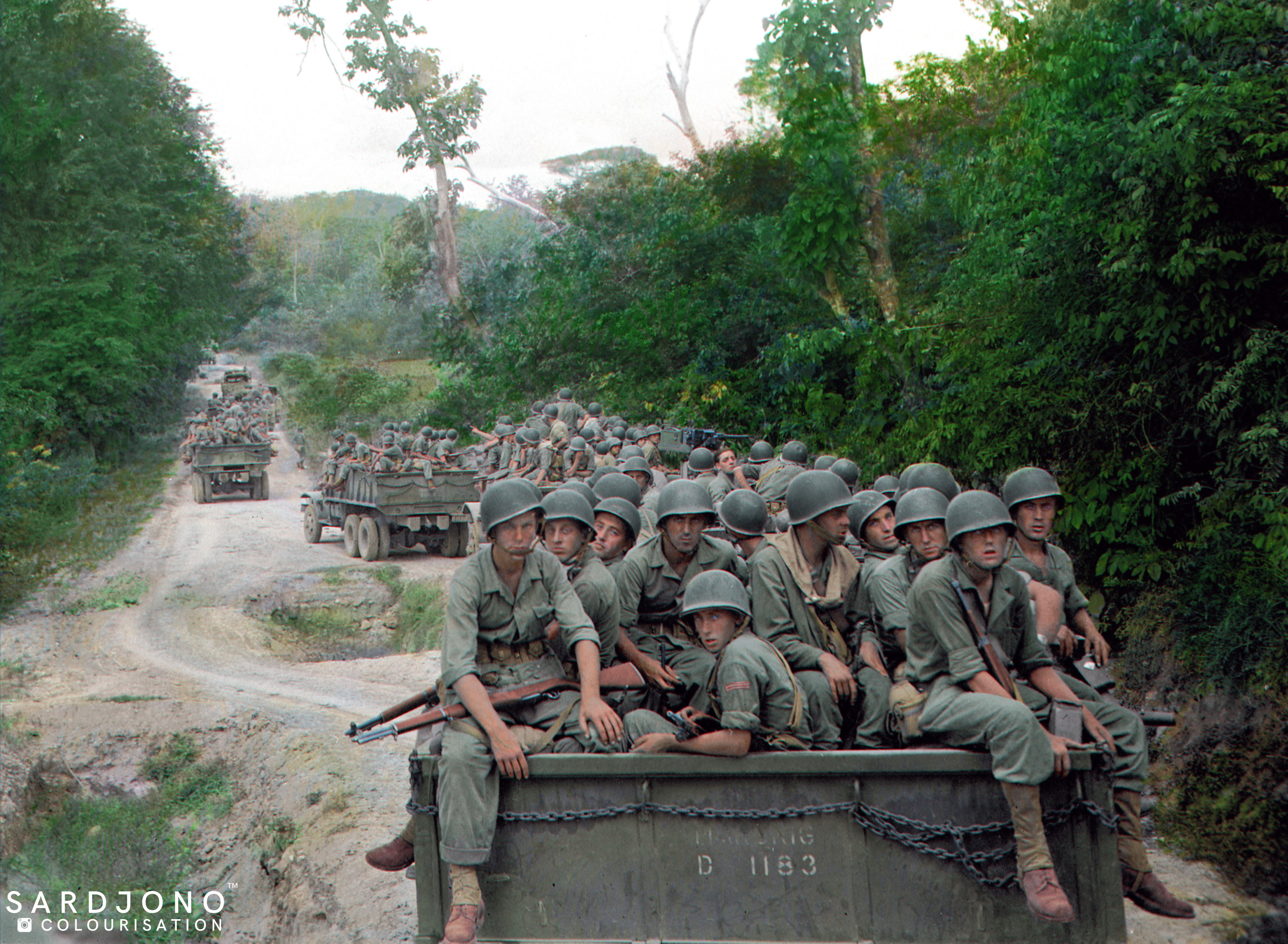
Marines advancing to Central Java on 21 December 1948.

At the end of 1948, the deteriorating military situation prompted the Dutch authorities to launch a second police action, Operation Kraai, the aim of which was to wipe out the Indonesian Republic once and for all by attacking Central Java – the stronghold of the nationalists – and other Republican areas. The Marines contributed to the capture of Central Java in an action that was again initiated by an amphibious landing in Republican territory. Operation Crow was a partial military success. All of Java was occupied and territorial gains were made on Sumatra, but the Dutch troops failed to inflict a decisive defeat on the forces of the Republic. With an even larger area to occupy, the problems with the guerrilla activity of the nationalists increased. Moreover, the action had the effect of increasing the foreign pressure on the Netherlands to deescalate.

In mid-1949, Dutch policy changed and the Dutch–Indonesian Round Table Conference would lead to the transfer of sovereignty later that year. On June 7, 1949, after three and a half years of presence in the East Indies, the Mariniersbrigade was disbanded. Many of the fallen marines are buried on the Dutch War Cemetery Kembang Kuning.

== Notable members ==
- Lieutenant H. A. L. Bila, recipient of the Bronze Lion (posthumous)
- Sergeant J. H. M. Boonen, recipient of the Bronze Cross (posthumous)
- Corporal H. Brandsma, Knight of the Military Order of William
- Captain J. Dourlein, Knight of the Military Order of William
- Corporal G. N. Hakkenberg, Knight of the Military Order of William
- Corporal A. Hoeben, Knight of the Military Order of William
- Corporal J. de Koster, Knight of the Military Order of William
- Captain C. G. Lems, Knight of the Military Order of William
- Lieutenant mr. F. W. B. van Lynden, recipient of the Bronze Cross
- Lieutenant K. C. Prins, recipient of the Bronze Lion (posthumous)
- Lieutenant Hugo Wilmar, Marine combat photographer
- Wim Dussel, Marine combat photographer, later served in the Korean War
- Lance corporal L. van Rixtel, recipient of the Bronze Lion (posthumous)
- Captain A. F. van Velsen, Knight of the Military Order of William
- Sergeant major J. de Waard, Knight of the Military Order of William
- Lieutenant G. H. W. Wouters, recipient of the Bronze Cross (posthumous)
