= Kembang Kuning War Cemetery =

Dutch war cemetery in Surabaya, Indonesia

Dutch Field of Honor Kembang Kuning
- Nederlands Ereveld Kembang Kuning; Makam Kehormatan Belanda di Kembang Kuning
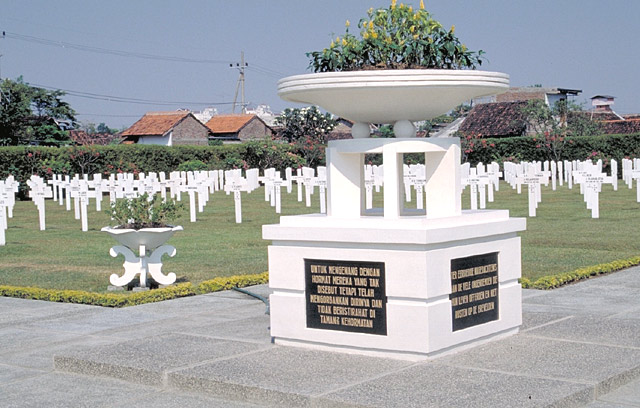
- Kembang Kuning War Cemetery
- Interactive map of Dutch Field of Honor Kembang Kuning

Details
- Location: Surabaya, East Java
- Country: Indonesia
- Coordinates: 7°17′08″S 112°43′27″E
- Type: War cemetery
- Owned by: Netherlands War Graves Foundation
- No. of graves: Over 5,000

Kembang Kuning War Cemetery, also Dutch Field of Honor Kembang Kuning (Dutch: Nederlands Ereveld Kembang Kuning, Indonesian: Makam Kehormatan Belanda di Kembang Kuning), is a war cemetery in Surabaya, East Java in Indonesia.

More than five thousand victims of the Pacific War and the Indonesian War of Independence are buried in the cemetery. This includes both civilians and servicemen of the former Royal Netherlands East Indies Army (Dutch: Koninklijk Nederlandsch-Indisch Leger, KNIL) and the Mariniersbrigade. A monument to naval officer Karel Doorman is located in the middle of the cemetery. This monument commemorates the Battle of the Java Sea on 27 February 1942, in which 918 Dutch sailors were killed. The names of the 915 missing are on fifteen bronze plates on the back of the monument. Only three casualties of the Battle of the Java Sea actually rest at the Karel Doormanhof section on Kembang Kuning.

== Notable burials ==
- R. W. Berghuis (1926–1948)
- J. M. L. I. Chömpff (1904–1942)
- S. A. Dikstaal (1901–1942)
- Francken sisters (1930/1932–1945)
- H. H. M. Fuhri (1915–1942)
- B. H. Hagendijk (1920–1942)
- Carel H. Kranenburg (1917–1947)
