= Kalibanteng War Cemetery =

Dutch war cemetery in Semarang, Indonesia

Dutch Field of Honor Kalibanteng
- Nederlands Ereveld Kalibanteng; Makam Kehormatan Belanda di Kalibanteng
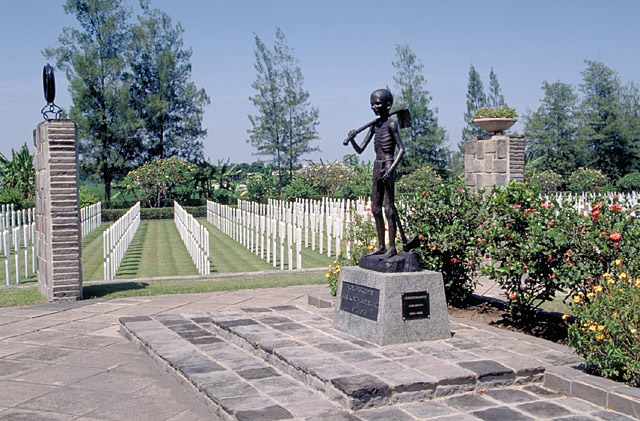
- Kalibanteng War Cemetery
- Interactive map of Dutch Field of Honor Kalibanteng

Details
- Location: Semarang, Central Java
- Country: Indonesia
- Coordinates: 6°59′05″S 110°22′43″E
- Type: War cemetery
- Owned by: Netherlands War Graves Foundation
- No. of graves: 3,100

Kalibanteng War Cemetery, also Dutch Field of Honor Kalibanteng (Dutch: Nederlands Ereveld Kalibanteng, Indonesian: Makam Kehormatan Belanda di Kalibanteng), is a war cemetery in the vicinity of the airport of Semarang, Central Java, in Indonesia. It is one of two Dutch war cemeteries in Semarang, the other being Candi War Cemetery.

== Graves and memorials ==
The cemetery contains 3,100 civilian and military casualties of the Pacific War. The vast majority of graves belong to Dutch women and children from the Japanese-run internment camps Ambarawa VI and VII in Ambarawa, and camps 10 and 11 near Banyubiru and Semarang.

It is unclear how many Dutch nationals are buried at this cemetery, as many graves lack identification. The cemetery contains a monument in memory of all women who died in Japanese-run women's internment camps, and another monument for the boys who lost their lives in the Japanese-run internment camps for boys older than 10.
