= Battle of Ciseupan =

1949 Battles In West Java

- Part of Indonesian National Revolution
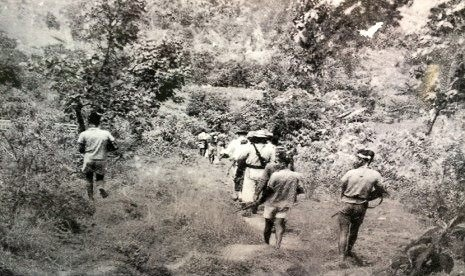
- Indonesian soldiers in Ciseupan
Date	5 February 1949
Location	Ciseupan, Subang, West Java
Result	Indonesian victory

Belligerents
Indonesia	Netherlands

Commanders and leaders
(Indonesia) Maj. Engkong Darsono	Unknown

Units involved
Siliwangi Division; Battalion 3001 Prabu Kiansantang	Royal Netherlands Army

Strength
1,500	Unknown

Casualties and losses
5 killed 3 severely wounded	41 killed Equipment loss: 3 Brens captured Bren ammunition captured 2 mortars captured 16 mortar rounds captured 48 Stens captured
- 2 civilian killed 2 civilian wounded 2 buffaloes killed

The Battle of Ciseupan (Indonesian: Pertempuran Ciseupan) was a clash between Indonesian nationalists from the Siliwangi Division and Dutch forces. The Dutch launched an attack on the village of Ciseupan, West Java, Indonesia with the objective of ambushing the Indonesian nationalists that were resting in the village during their long march.

== Background ==
On December 19, 1948, the Dutch launched their second military aggression. The capital of the Republic of Indonesia in Yogyakarta was seized by the Dutch, and the Indonesian president Sukarno, Vice-president Mohammad Hatta, and ex-prime minister Sutan Sjahrir were captured by the Dutch and later exiled to Bangka, along with several other Indonesian leaders, were captured. General Soedirman, along with the Armed Forces, retreated into the forests to wage a guerrilla war against the Dutch.

The Siliwangi Division, which had relocated to Yogyakarta, promptly began their Long March to West Java on December 20, 1948. One of the Battalion of the Long March was Battalion 3001 Prabu Kiansantang from Brigade XIII Siliwangi Division led by Major Engkong Darsono. The battalion consisted of approximately 1,500 Indonesian nationalists armed with various weapons.

== Long March ==
On Thursday, February 4, 1949, the village of Rancamanggung welcomed the 1,500 soldiers from Battalion 3001 Prabu Kiansantang, as part of their long march from Yogyakarta to Bandung. Due to the limited capacity of Rancamanggung Village, some of the soldiers were dispersed to other areas, including Ciseupan in the village of Cibuluh specifically in Pasirsereh.

To ensure smooth operations and security, the battalion leadership issued a letter to the Dutch Army Headquarter in Cidongkol, Subang. The nearest Dutch posts were located in Cikaramas and Gardusayang. The letters informed the Dutch authorities that the Indonesian Army, migrating from Yogyakarta, sought permission to stay temporarily in Ciseupan and Pasirereh and requested security assistance for their journey to Bandung to avoid disturbances from Dutch forces. After receiving the letter, the Dutch granted their permission under the condition that all weapons had to be securely bound.

== Battle ==
On Friday, the next day, at around 4:00 a.m., Dutch soldiers suddenly arrived in Ciseupan 1, approaching from the direction of Bolang. Forcefully, the Dutch troops gathered the youths and residents of Ciseupan 1, demanding they reveal the location of the Indonesian Army leadership in Pasirsereh. Out of fear, the villagers reluctantly led them as far as Kampung Ciseupan 2. At around 5:00 a.m., after the Fajr prayer, a man named Sanusi, on his way home, was called out by the Dutch soldiers. Perhaps he didn't understand the language or didn't hear them calling, so he continued walking without responding. As he reached his door to unlock it, a Dutch soldier fired a shot, killing Sanusi instantly. He became the first civilian casualty of the incident.

The Dutch soldiers continued their advance toward Pasirsereh with the intention of ambushing the Indonesian Army stationed there. Caught off guard by the sudden arrival of the Dutch forces while they were resting, the Indonesian troops were unable to mount a balanced resistance. Consequently, they retreated to the Rancamanggung area, though many of their weapons were seized by the Dutch soldiers. After conducting the raid in Pasirsereh, the Dutch forces found no trace of the Indonesian Army. Frustrated, they returned to Kampung Ciseupan 2.

Major Engkong Darsono, stationed in the Rancamanggung area, received reports from soldiers in Ciseupan about the presence of Dutch soldiers. In response, all Indonesian troops were mobilized toward Ciseupan. By 8:00 a.m., the Indonesian Army arrived at the location. The Indonesian soldiers opened fire on the Dutch soldiers positioned below, a fierce and intense battle ensued, with the Indonesian forces relentlessly pressing forward. As the fighting intensified, the Dutch soldiers were forced to retreat in disarray into the rice fields and then toward Ciseupan 1.

== Aftermath ==
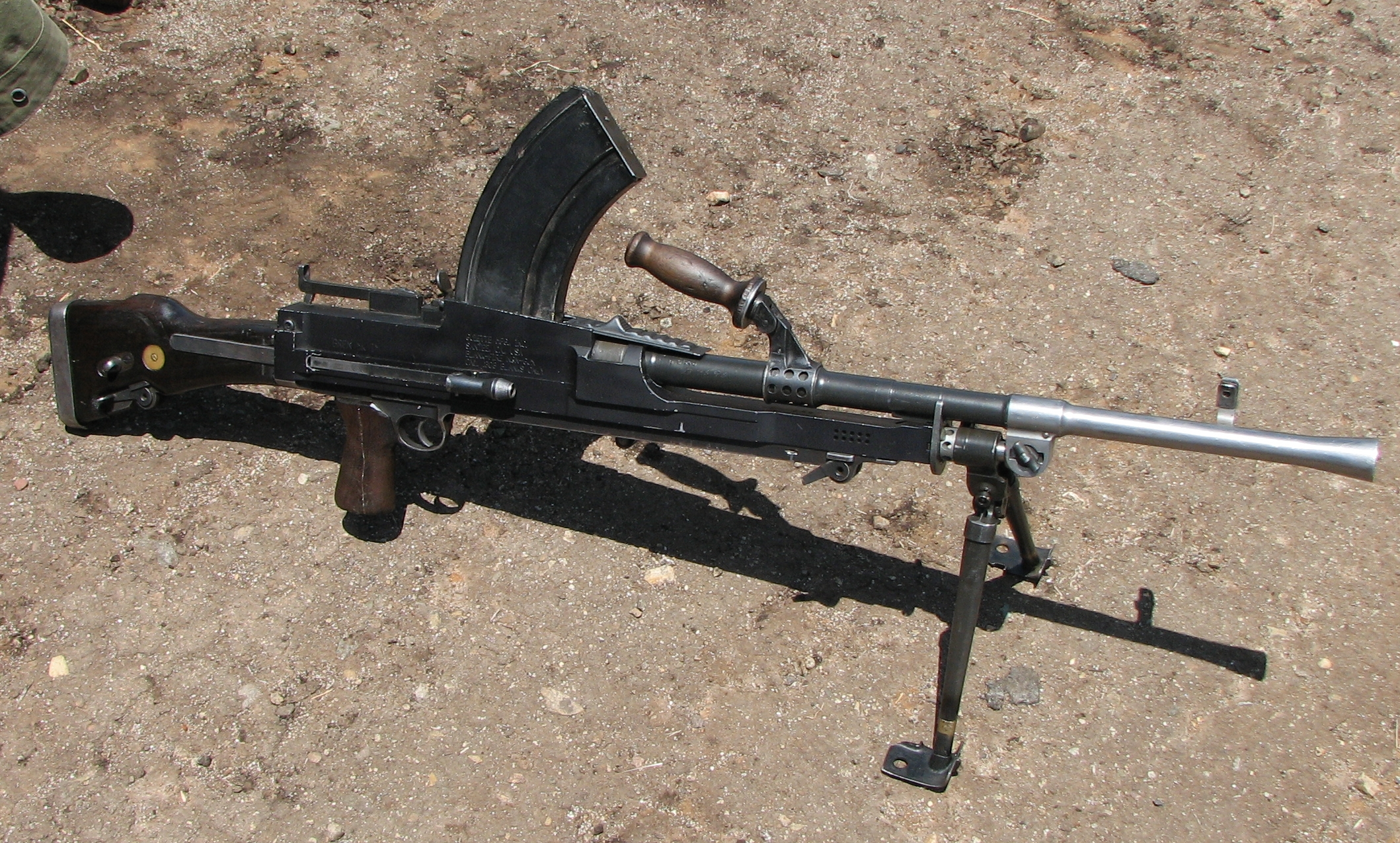
Bren gun similar to the one captured by the Indonesian during the battle

The battle resulted in casualties on the Indonesian side. 5 soldiers from the Siliwangi Division and 2 civilians lost their lives, while 3 soldiers were severely wounded, and 2 civilians were wounded. Additionally, 2 buffaloes belonging to the local villagers were also shot dead. On the Dutch side, 1 officer with the rank of major, 5 lieutenants, and 35 soldiers were killed. After the battle, the Siliwangi forces seized 3 Bren light machine guns along with their ammunition, 2 mortars with 16 rounds, and 48 Sten from the Dutch.

Although the battle was not a decisive victory, the Indonesian battalion successfully pushed back the Dutch forces and made them retreated towards Ciseupan 1. The Battalion feeling perhaps unsafe, they reversed their route and headed back toward Rancamanggung, then moved through Ciburuan Jingkang in Sumedang before heading toward Subang.

== Legacy ==
To honor the events of the battle in Ciseupan, the Monumen Perjuangan '45 (Monument of the 1945 Struggle) was established in Kampung Ciseupan, Desa Cibuluh, Kecamatan Tanjungsiang. This monument symbolizes the bravery and sacrifices of the Indonesian soldiers and civilians during the Indonesian National Revolution. It was officially inaugurated on May 20, 1976, serving as both a tribute to those who fought and died in the battle and a reminder of the nation's determination in its struggle for independence. The monument remains an important historical landmark for both locals and visitors.
