= T-Brigade =

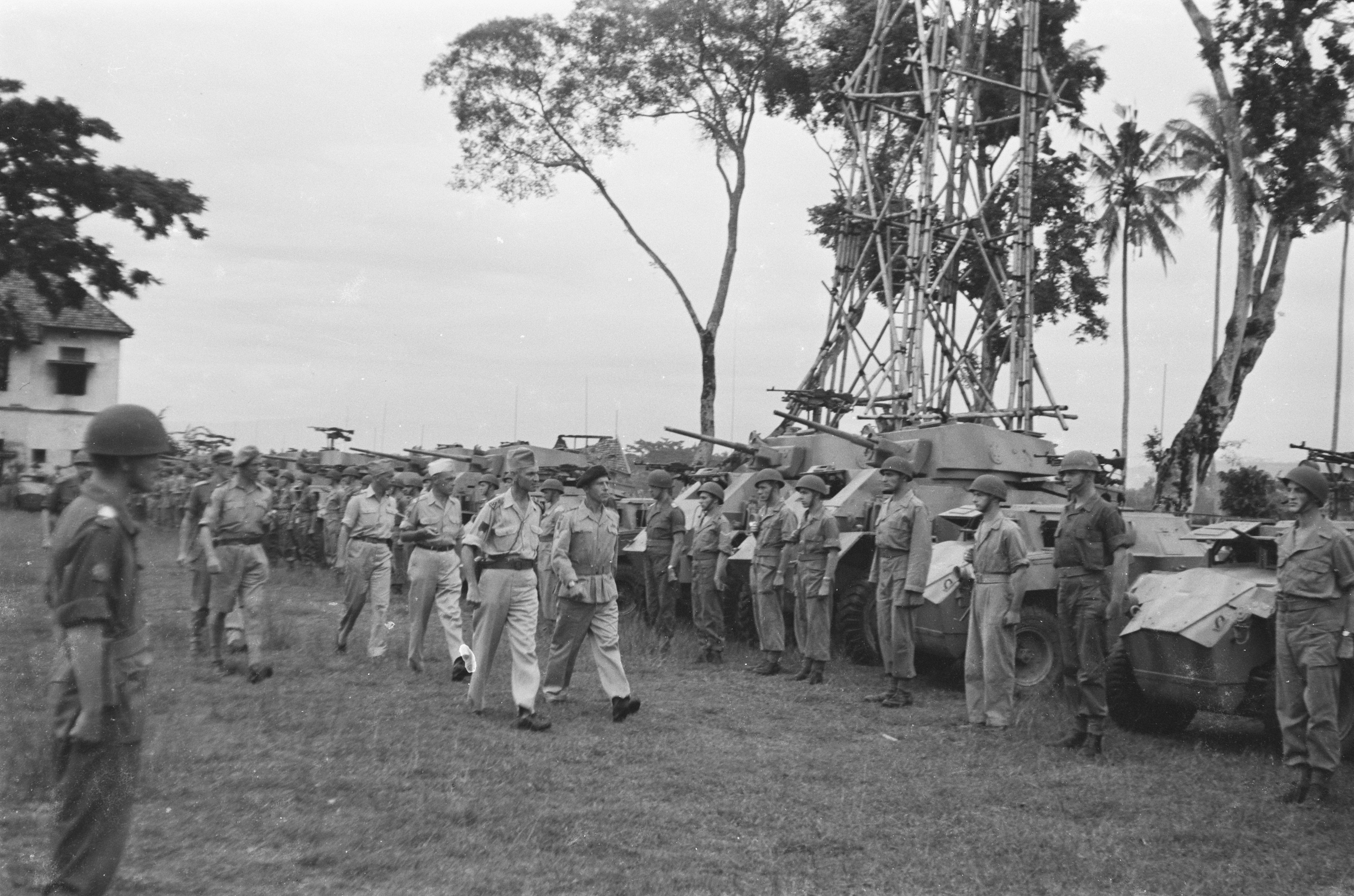
- Col. D.R.A. van Langen (center left), commander of T-Brigade, inspects troops of the 2nd Armored Car Squadron in Salatiga, November 1947
- Founded: 15 January 1946
- Disbanded: 16 December 1949
- Country: Netherlands
- Branch: Royal Netherlands Army
- Size: Brigade group
- Part of: B-Division
- Nickname: Tijgerbrigade (Tiger Brigade)
- Engagements: Indonesian War of Independence

Commanders
- 1946: Col. S. de Waal
- 1946–1949: Col. D.R.A. van Langen

Insignia
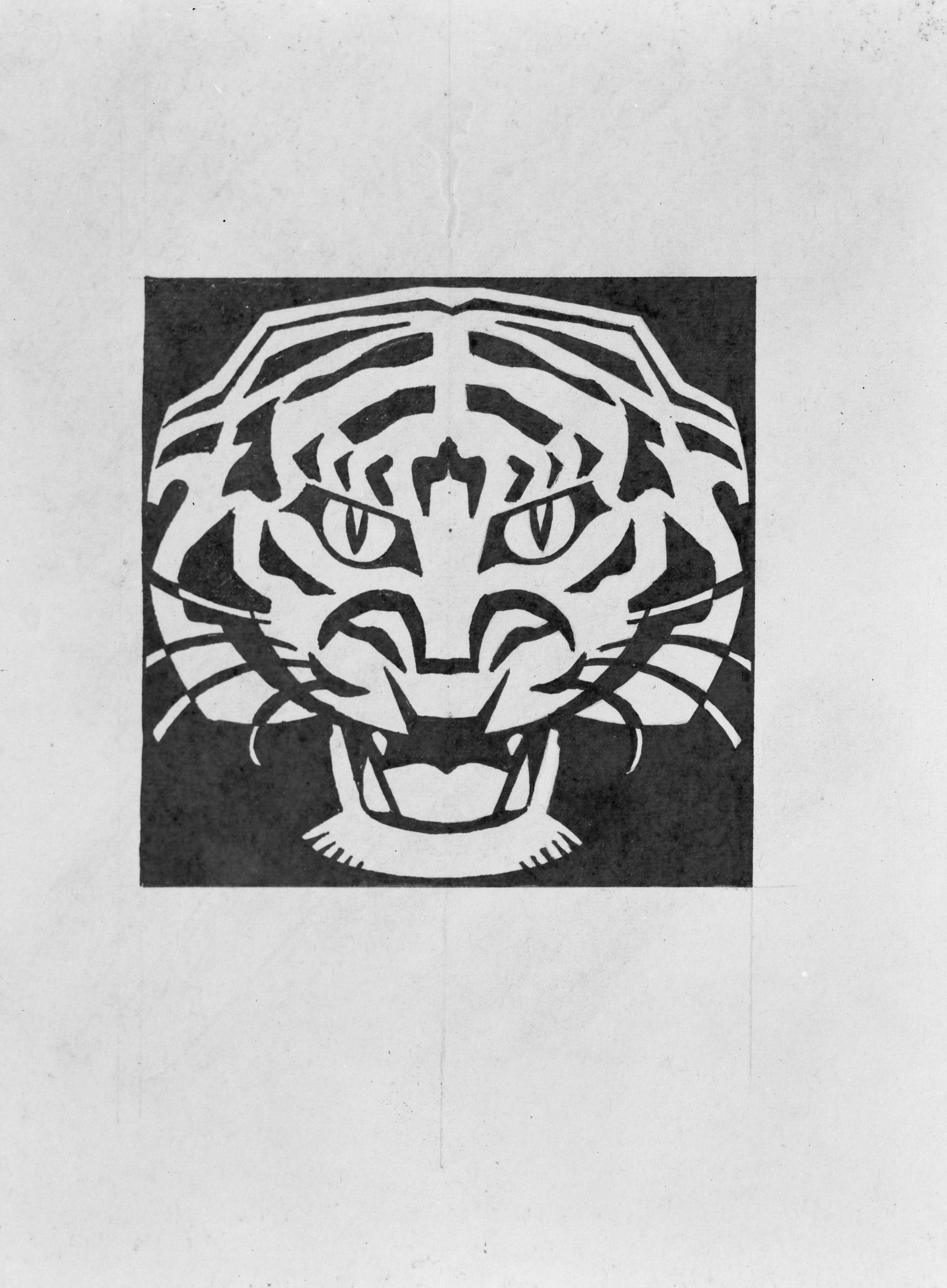
- Emblem of the T-Brigade

T-Brigade was a brigade group of the Royal Netherlands Army. At the end of the World War II, the formation consisted of the 2nd Battalion, 6th RIR, 1st Stootroepen Battalion and the 2/13th Light Infantry Battalion. The T-Brigade relieved the British 5th Parachute Brigade in Java on 26 April 1946.

== See also ==
- Oorlogsvrijwilligers
- Police Actions (Indonesia)
