= Leuwigajah War Cemetery =

Dutch war cemetery in Cimahi, Indonesia

Dutch Field of Honor Leuwigajah
- Nederlands Ereveld Leuwigajah; Makam Kehormatan Belanda di Leuwigajah
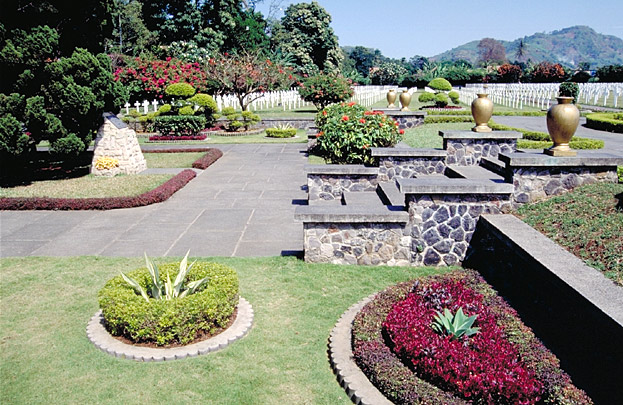
- Leuwigajah War Cemetery
- Interactive map of Dutch Field of Honor Leuwigajah

Details
- Location: Cimahi, West Java
- Country: Indonesia
- Coordinates: 6°54′20″S 107°31′45″E
- Type: War cemetery
- Owned by: Netherlands War Graves Foundation
- No. of graves: 5,200

Leuwigajah War Cemetery, also Dutch Field of Honor Leuwigajah (Dutch: Nederlands Ereveld Leuwigajah, Indonesian: Makam Kehormatan Belanda di Leuwigajah), is a war cemetery just outside of Cimahi, West Java, in Indonesia.

== Description ==
The war cemetery is located on a formerly vacant lot behind the municipal cemetery. During the Japanese occupation of the Dutch East Indies, this site was used by the Imperial Japanese military to bury Dutch war dead and prisoners from nearby internment camps. Only after the war was the lot formally turned into a cemetery, which resulted in many reburials. It was not until 20 December 1949 that the Dutch government designated this location as a war cemetery.

== Monument ==
At the rear of the cemetery stands a flagpole in a small bed, behind which visitors can descend to a small courtyard where a memorial stone has been placed in memory of those who died aboard Japanese hell ships in the years 1942–1945. A memorial plaque was placed here on 21 September 1984. It is still commemorated annually on 18 September that the cargo steamer Jun'yō Maru was torpedoed near Bengkulu on Sumatra's west coast in 1944. The ship carried 2,300 Allied prisoners of war and 4,200 Javanese forced laborers, resulting in the loss of 5,600 lives.

== Size ==
Leuwigajah War Cemetery is one of the largest of its kind in Indonesia and contains the largest amount of graves in any property managed by the Netherlands War Graves Foundation. There are more than 5,000 graves belonging to Dutch nationals, many of whom had served in the former Royal Netherlands East Indies Army (Dutch: Koninklijk Nederlandsch-Indisch Leger, KNIL) and the Royal Netherlands Army. In the 1960s, a large number of war victims were reburied here when ten memorial cemeteries across Indonesia were closed; one in Muntok in 1960, Padang in 1962, Tarakan in 1964, Medan in 1966, and those in Palembang and Balikpapan in 1967. The servicemen who were buried in the remaining four cemeteries that were shuttered now rest in Ancol War Cemetery. After all the reburials, the cemetery contains a total of 5,200 graves.
