= Rengat massacre =

War crime by Dutch forces

- Part of Operation Kraai
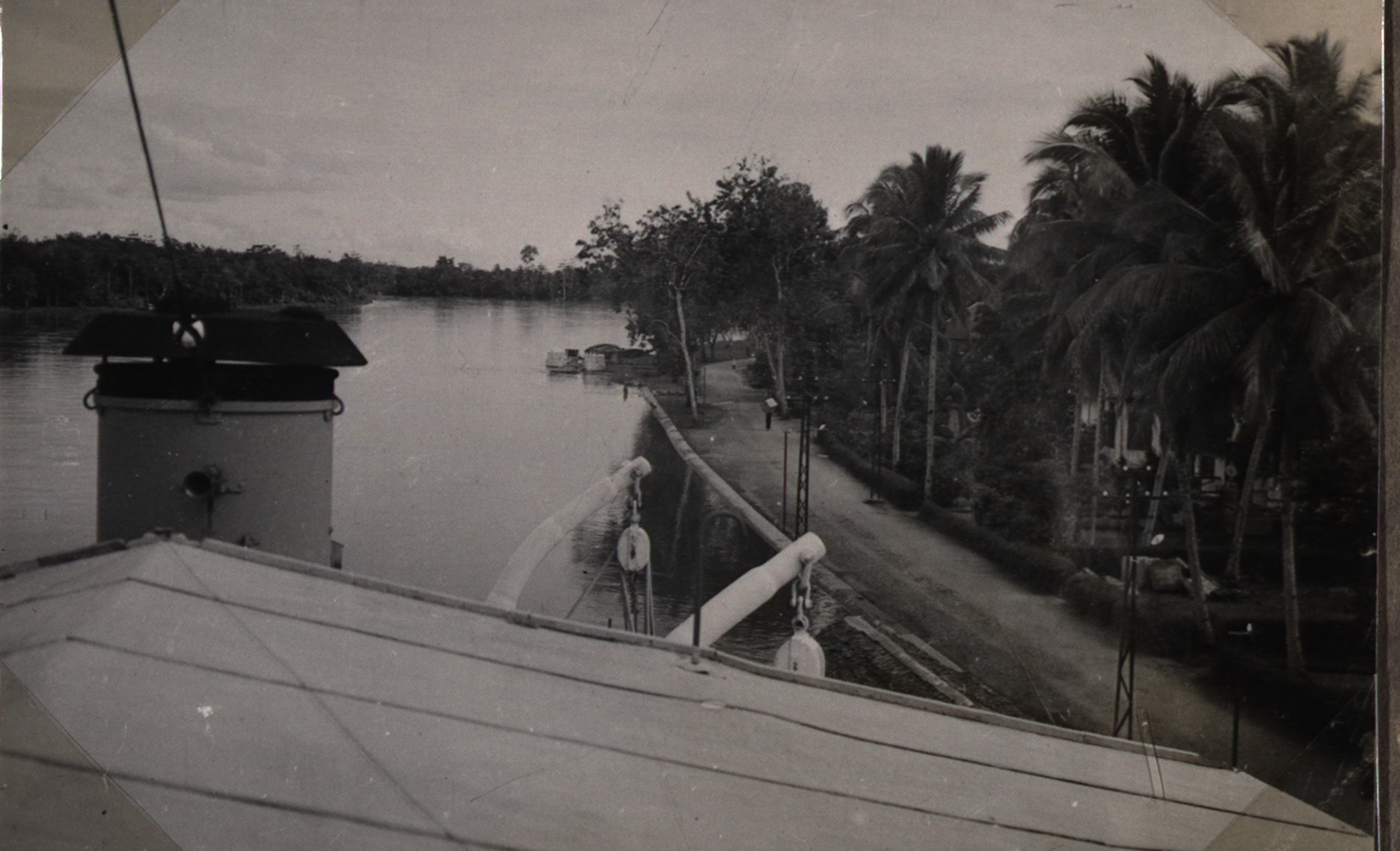
- The Indragiri River (Batang Kuantan) at Rengat
- Location: Rengat, Riau, Dutch East Indies
- Date: 5 January 1949
- Attack type: Massacre
- Deaths: 80–400 (Dutch claims); 1,500–2,600 (Indonesian claims)
- Victims: Militants, officials, civilians
- Perpetrator: Korps Speciale Troepen (KNIL)

The Rengat massacre (Dutch: Bloedbad van Rengat, Indonesian: Pembantaian Rengat) was committed by the Royal Netherlands East Indies Army on 5 January 1949 in Rengat, Riau during Operation Kraai. Following the capture of the town, paratroopers of the Korps Speciale Troepen under lieutenant Rudy de Mey subjected confirmed and suspected TNI militants, civil servants, and ordinary townspeople to looting, rape, and summary execution. Bodies were disposed of in the Indragiri River.

Upon landing, the unit's third engagement in three weeks, the commander had supplied the paratroopers with benzedrine tablets (a stimulant synonymous with the drug speed), which was also provided to soldiers during World War II and the Vietnam War, "to eliminate fatigue". It became one of the deadliest Dutch military operations in Sumatra.

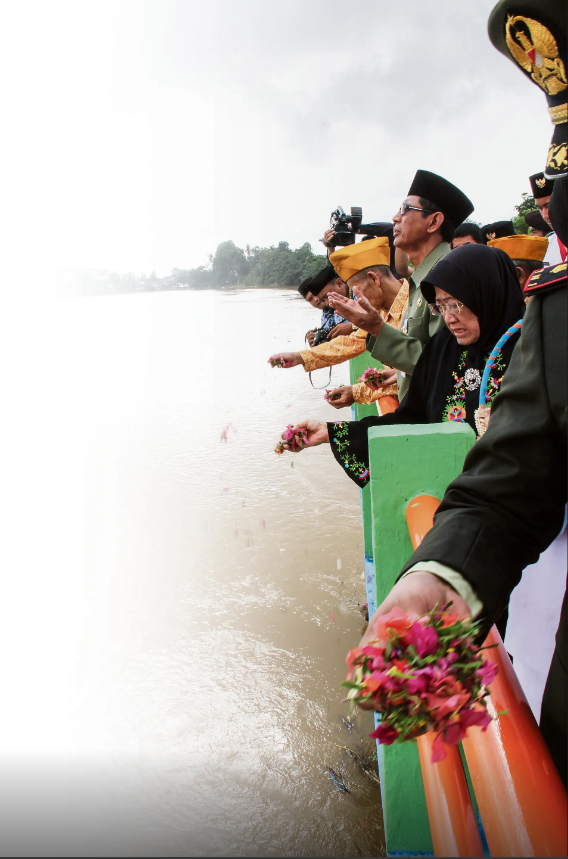
Commemoration Peristiwa Rengat 5 January 2016 (Picture by Anne-Lot Hoek)

In the wake of the atrocity, an investigation was opened under the auspices of Tony Lovink, the High Commissioner of the Crown in the Dutch East Indies. He had succeeded Louis Beel in May 1949 and defended the actions of the army in the general terms that General Simon Spoor had always used: praising its "iron discipline", referring to atrocities as "excesses", not generalising, strict instructions. In July 1949, he had carried out another inspection in South Sulawesi, where, in his opinion, "perfect order and tranquility" prevailed because terror had been successfully repaid with terror there. On the other hand, he described the actions of the paratroops in Rengat as a "slaughter", which, like the Peniwen affair, was "coldly and matter-of-factly repulsive in terms of cruelty and makes us shudder to think that what had happened here might be considered normative for the actions of our troops."

== Death toll ==
Estimates of the death toll from the Rengat massacre vary considerably between sources.

In 1968, Indies veteran Joop Hueting told about his experiences in de Volkskrant and on Dutch national television in the VARA current affairs program Achter het Nieuws. He spoke of war crimes committed by the Dutch army in Indonesia and he also confessed he had participated in these acts as well. His revelations were discussed in the Dutch House of Representatives. Labour Party leader Joop den Uyl called for a parliamentary inquiry. It became an archival research led by historian Cees Fasseur, which resulted in an excessennota ("memorandum of excesses") in June 1969.

This memorandum, which devoted several paragraphs to Rengat, contains the following conclusion:

"Due to an unfortunate combination of circumstances, a number of people from the civilian population lost their lives on the day of the occupation of Rengat and the surrounding area, which number is approximately 80, but is grossly exaggerated by partisan reporters." 30 combatants were also killed.

This number of 80 has consistently appeared in Dutch official statements since 1969.

Only in 2013 did a new death toll emerge via the Dutch Honorary Debts Committee Foundation (KUKB). This time a number of 2,600 victims (2,000 in Rengat and 600 in Likrit), including a number of 120 dead recorded in the National Archives, by local historian S.E Susilowadi. In 2015, the KUKB announced the start of their research in Sumatra to the public. As of February 2016, authors Rasman Wads and Himron Saheman had also made mention of 2,000 deaths in their books.

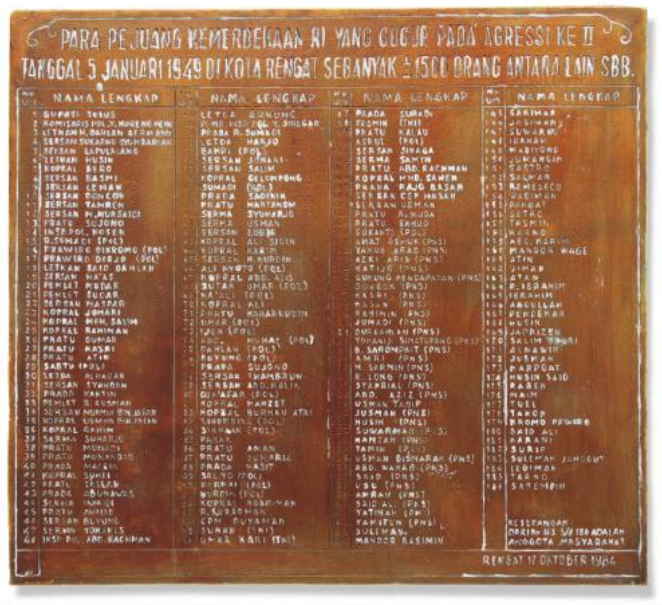
List with 186 names on monument Rengat (Photo by Anne-Lot Hoek, 2016)

In February 2016, Dutch historian Anne-Lot Hoek also went to Rengat, where the memorial on site lists a death toll of 1,500 and also 186 named victims. She spoke to witnesses and conducted research in the National Archives that revealed the following victim numbers, with sources from 1949:

- The public prosecutor of Riau made note of 120 deaths, which he further reduced to "about 80" in his conclusion
- It turned out that a previously unknown list of names of 120 "murdered civilians" existed. That list included 27 killed police officers, including many former KNIL soldiers, some with a long record of Dutch service
- In a personal conversation with the prosecutor, the Dutch Resident M.D. Voors considered the army's conduct to "more than criminal." 400 people were said to have been murdered "completely at random" and "from behind their desks"
- An article from a Chinese newspaper from 1949 mentions a number of victims exceeding 1,000

Based on a comparison between the 186 names on the monument and the new information from the archive, a minimum number of individual victims of at least 270 could be substantiated. In February 2016, Hoek published her findings in NRC Handelsblad and on NPO Radio 1. In September, she published another two-part story about Rengat in Inside Indonesia.

Human rights lawyer Liesbeth Zegveld, in a response, called the events from this new investigation 'of the same order of magnitude as Rawagede and the massacres in South Sulawesi'.

In October 2016, Swiss-Dutch historian Rémy Limpach added an estimate by Djaksa Perhimpoena of 500 victims as an additional source to the above list.

At the end of 2016, Zegveld started a case against the state on behalf of the KUKB and traveled to Rengat for the first time. She made a radio report about this for NPO Radio 1, which did not result in the discovery of more victims. In April 2017, Rengat was the subject of discussion on EenVandaag.

== Compensation ==
Anne-Lot Hoek published a second article in NRC Handelsblad in February 2016, in which she interviewed Liesbeth Zegveld, known from the lawsuits against the Dutch state on the massacres on South Celebes (Sulawesi) and Java (Rawagede massacre) and Jeffrey Pondaag, chairman of stichting Comité Nederlandse Ereschulden (KUKB). Zegveld announced she would assist the relatives of the victims in lawsuits if required and Pondaag stated: „These are Dutch Civilians that have been murdered”.

A case was submitted by Liesbeth Zegveld and the KUKB against the Dutch state at the end of 2016. One of those killed was the father of the famous author Chairil Anwar. The sister of Anwar tried unsuccessfully to obtain compensation for the death of their father. The case was dismissed because the government invoked the statute of limitations, arguing it should have been submitted earlier.

In May 2017, one of the widows from Skip kampong in Rengat, whose husband was a police officer and was executed, was paid compensation of 20,000 euros by the Dutch state. Such compensation was only awarded if it could be proven that someone was executed by Dutch soldiers in an action "of comparable severity and nature as Rawagede and South Sulawesi." An amount of 20,000 euros had only been paid out once before since 2013.

== See also ==
- Police Actions (Indonesia)
- South Sulawesi campaign of 1946–1947
- Gerbong Maut incident
- Rawagede massacre
