= Anne-Lot Hoek =

Dutch historian, researcher and author

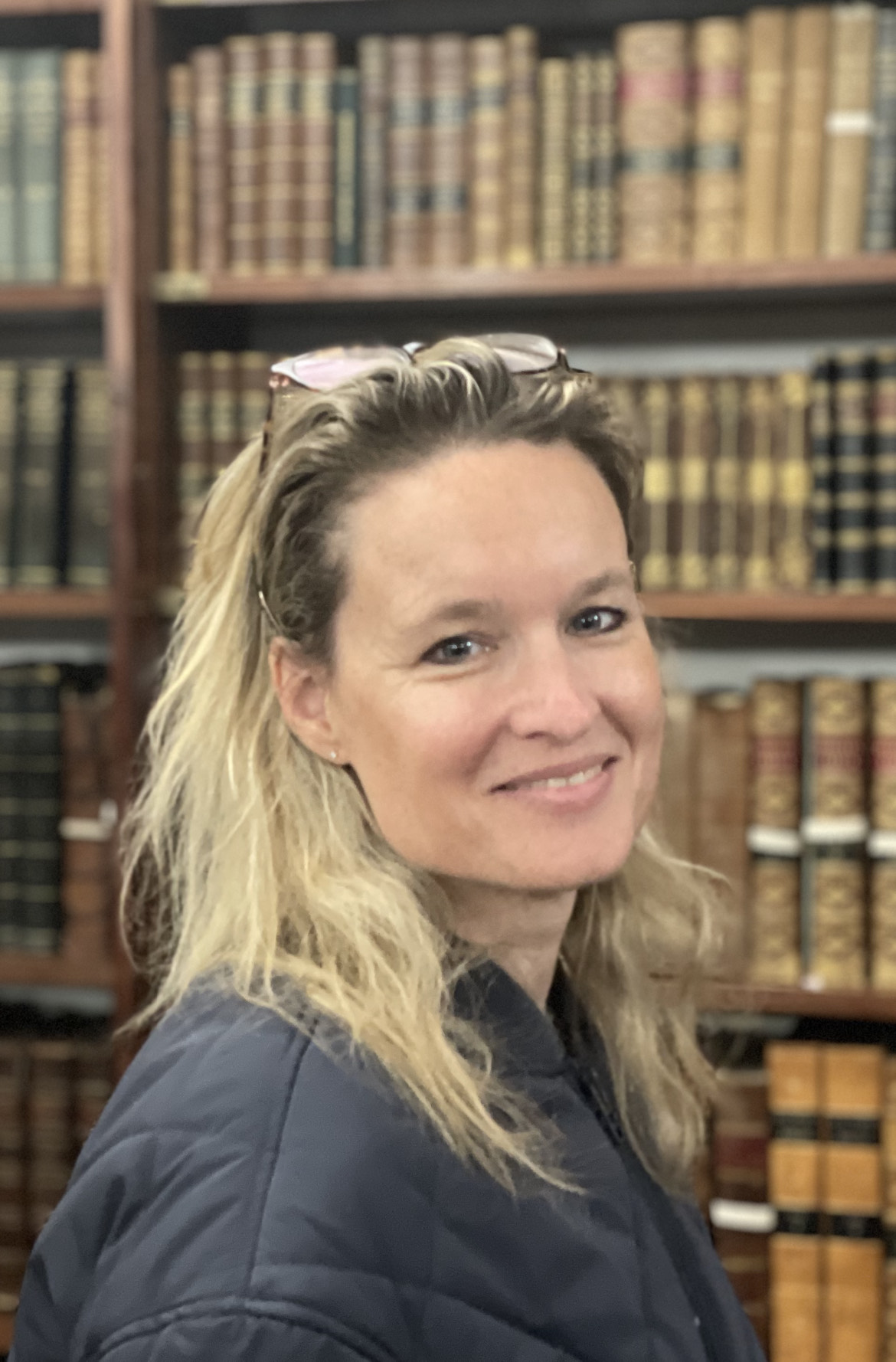
- Anne-Lot Hoek
- Born: 17 June 1978 (age 48); The Hague
- Education: University of Amsterdam and University of Perugia
- Occupations: Historian, researcher, author
- Notable work: De strijd om Bali. Imperialisme, verzet en onafhankelijkheid 1846–1950 ('The Battle for Bali. Imperialism, resistance and independence 1846–1950')

Anne-Lot Hoek (born 17 June 1978) is a Dutch historian, independent researcher and author. She writes historical non-fiction, articles and academic publications, with a focus on colonial history and the independence struggle in South-Africa, Namibia and Indonesia.

== Biography ==
Anne-Lot Hoek was born in The Hague and attended the Adelbert College gymnasium from 1991 to 1997.

=== Studies ===
Hoek studied history at the University of Amsterdam and political history at the University of Perugia in Italy. She obtained her master's degree at the faculty of Humanities of the University of Amsterdam and went on to earn a PhD in 2023 for her dissertation De strijd om Bali. Geweld, verzet en koloniale staatsvorming 1846–1950 (The Battle for Bali. Violence, Resistance and Colonial State Formation 1846–1950).

=== Career ===
Hoek has lived and worked in Amsterdam, Windhoek and Cape Town. In 2021 she launched her debut De strijd om Bali. Imperialisme, verzet en onafhankelijkheid 1846–1950 (De Bezige Bij), for which she had interviewed 128 people involved on Bali and in the Netherlands in addition to extensive archival research.

During her seven years of research she discovered, for example, that the Dutch army built a tangsi-system of 50 prison camps on Bali in which torture and executions were a systematic phenomenon. Her account shows how the battle for the island should be understood within a long tradition of anti-colonial violence and reveals how after World War II the island, as part of the federal state of East-Indonesia, played a key role in Dutch decolonization policy. Up until that point the focus of historians had mainly been on Java. Hoek's book also addresses the more general aspects of the decolonization of the Dutch East Indies.

De strijd om Bali resulted in a set of questions from the House of Representatives in the Netherlands, and articles in Dutch national newspapers like NRC Handelsblad, the Trouw, Nederlands Dagblad and de Volkskrant. It became national news on television and radio with subsequently RTL Nieuws and NPO Radio 1. TV channel Omroep West made a special. She received book reviews in Dutch national newspapers such as NRC Handelsblad and Nederlands Dagblad as well as in history-related media such as Historiek and Historisch Nieuwsblad, and in Belgium in De lage landen ('The Low Countries'). Preview publications appeared in NRC Handelsblad and De Groene Amsterdammer, and she was interviewed in Dutch national and regional newspapers such as Algemeen Dagblad and Den Haag Centraal, and on national radio in Nieuwsweekend, and OVT as she appeared on Buitenhof (TV series).

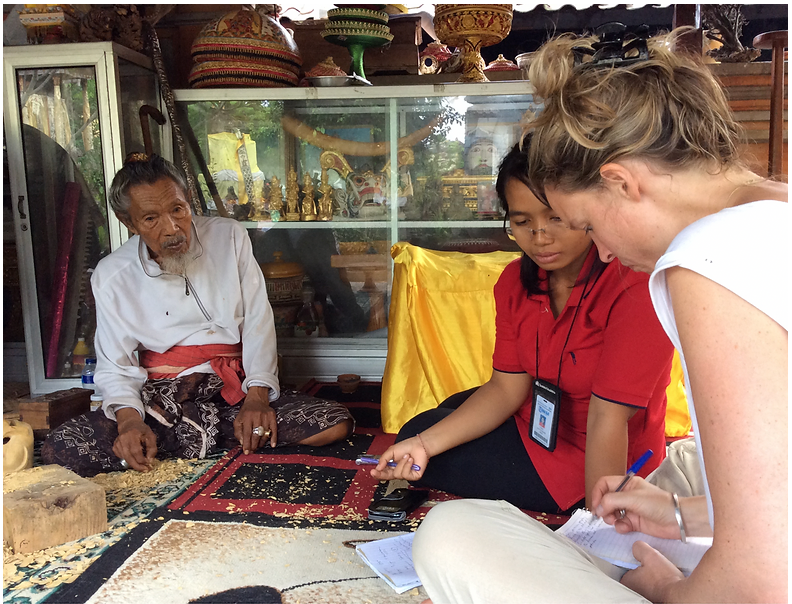
Interview of independence fighter Ratu Ida Gede Burwan Manuaba by Anne-Lot Hoek and Ni Ketut Sudiani on Bali (2015)

From 2005 to 2007 Hoek worked at the African Studies Centre Leiden (ASC) and performed research in Bolivia, Zambia, Cameroon and Mali. In 2012 she again carried out research in Zambia. At that point she was working as a freelance journalist contributing to Vrij Nederland, and later NRC Handelsblad and De Groene Amsterdammer. Since 2012 she has written more than 32 articles on Indonesia's colonial past.

In her first article on Indonesia she contributed to the request for rehabilitation for three marines who had refused to set fire to a kampong in reprisal. A few months later, a motion to this effect was submitted in the House of Representatives. In 2013, Hoek conducted archival research which revealed for the first time that the Netherlands had committed war crimes in Bali. She also interviewed several veterans who were willing to confirm these findings. This was picked up by national and international media outlets, and other authors since.

In 2014, she discovered archive documents showing that the Dutch authorities ran Bali as their private kingdom during the Indonesian War of Independence. A damning official investigation report into corruption and intimidation in Bali was suppressed, as was the man who wrote it.

In 2015, she stated that historical institutes in the Netherlands had neglected their task for 65 years. She also made headlines in NRC Handelsblad with an article about a Swiss dissertation that refuted the excessive violence research from 1969. In 2016, Hoek delved deeper into the question of why Dutch historians of the previous generation, such as the head of the excessive violence research Cees Fasseur, had taken an evasive attitude towards the actual violence in Indonesia. According to two-fold Libris History Prize winner Martin Bossenbroek the article contributed to a paradigm shift, a historiographical regime change. Since then, Hoek has been seen as one of the persons at the base of a new generation of historians who confront the Netherlands and its politicians with the truth.

Early 2016, Hoek traveled to Indonesia for research in Rengat on Sumatra to investigate an attack on the city in January 1949. In the Netherlands the official death toll since the Excessive Violence nota of 1969 was 80, while in Rengat there was a statue to 1,500 victims with the names of 186. In addition to interviewing witnesses, she performed research in the Dutch National Archive and discovered a range of previously unknown sources from 1949; a list with the names of 120 'fallen civilians', a statement by the Dutch Resident that the death toll was 400, and an article in a Chinese newspaper referring to more than 1,000 victims. By comparing these with sources from the Netherlands and Indonesia a new absolute minimal death count of 270 individuals emerged.

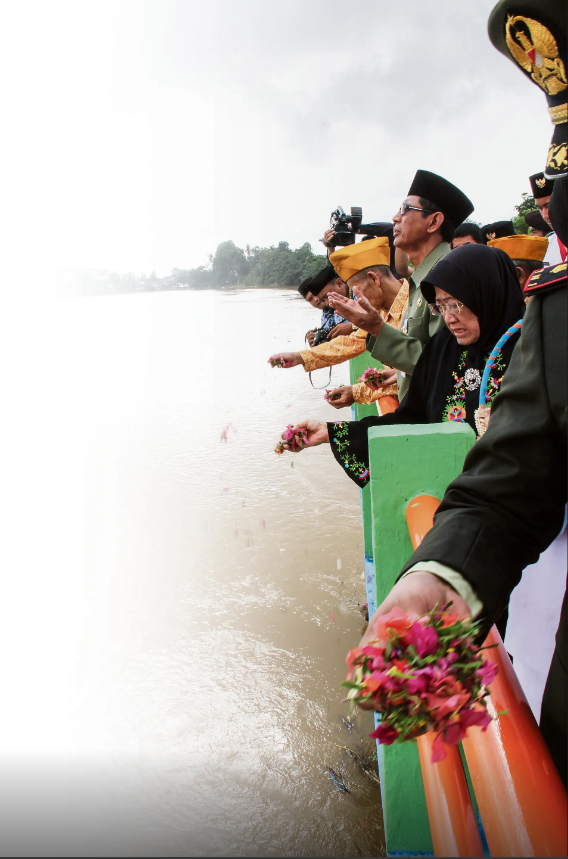
Commemoration Peristiwa Rengat 5 January 2016

The research resulted in two articles for NRC Handelsblad and a radio report, The Rengat Massacre, on NPO Radio 1. It was subsequently picked up by national media such as Algemeen Dagblad, de Volkskrant, Trouw, the Nederlandse Omroep Stichting and RTL Nieuws. Human rights lawyer Liesbeth Zegveld calls the events in the research of Hoek in a reaction 'from the same size and severity as the Rawagede massacre and the massacre on South-Sulawesi' (the South Sulawesi campaign of 1946–1947). It was one of the deadliest Dutch military operations in Sumatra, possibly the largest individual war crime in the entire war according to David Van Reybrouck. Hoek also made a two-part series about Rengat for Inside Indonesia.

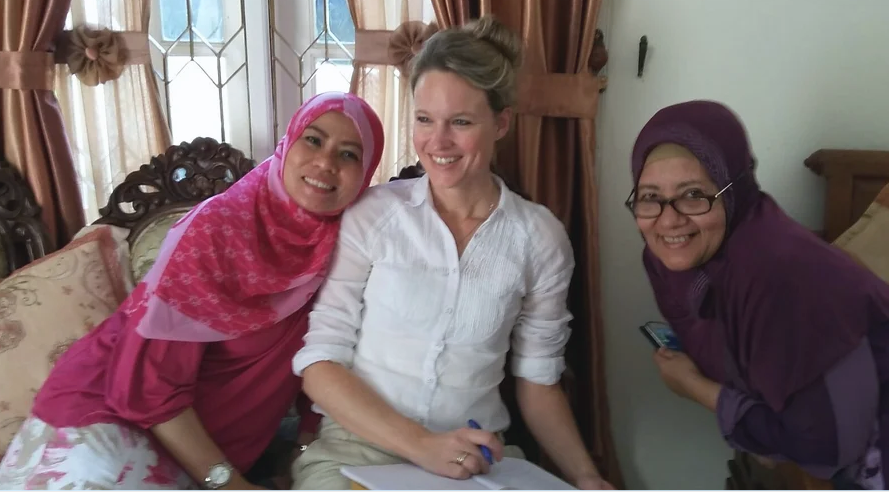
Anne-Lot Hoek performing research in Indonesia

One of the widows from kampong Skip in Rengat, whose police office husband was executed, was compensated in 2017 by the Dutch state with an amount of Euro20,000, which was only to be granted if it could be proved that the person was executed by the Dutch military during an action "of comparable severity and nature as the Rawagede massacre and (or) South-Sulawesi". The BBC in Indonesia dedicated an extensive article to her research on Sumatra and Bali and it was picked up further.

The Rengat article was published in February 2016. A few months later, in July 2016, the KITLV/Royal Netherlands Institute of Southeast Asian and Caribbean Studies, the NIOD Institute for War, Holocaust and Genocide Studies and The Netherlands Institute of Military History (NIMH) were informed by the Ministry of Foreign Affairs they should start to prepare for a possible switch in the stance by the government. Minister Bert Koenders got convinced that a large scale research was needed, and also at General Affairs, headed by prime minister Mark Rutte ‘things were moving’.

In October 2016 the Swiss dissertation was published in Dutch. At the end of 2016, Bert Koenders wrote to the House of Representatives that there is "sufficient reason for a broad-based investigation" into the violence used in Indonesia in the period 1945–1949. Member of the House of Representatives Sjoerd Sjoerdsma, who had been lobbying in favor of the investigation, told Hoek in an interview that the political approval for the government-financed research: Independence, decolonization, violence and war in Indonesia, 1945–1950 (Dutch: "ODGOI"-research) in the House was for 75% a result of new facts stemming from journalism and lawsuits against the Dutch state, and for 25% based upon the earlier mentioned Swiss dissertation. After new facts about this period have emerged 'drop by drop', the book publication of the Swiss dissertation in October 2016 was the proverbial 'splash' that made the already full bucket overflow. Hoek responded to the cabinet decision in Nieuwsuur.

In 2016 and 2017 she was a fellow at the KITLV/Royal Netherlands Institute of Southeast Asian and Caribbean Studies and journalist-in-residence at the Netherlands Institute for Advanced Study (NIAS), both institutes of the Royal Netherlands Academy of Arts and Sciences. Between 2017 and 2019 she wrote an article for Revolutionary Worlds as part of the "ODGOI"-research.

According to aforementioned Martin Bossenbroek, a new phenomenon in the Netherlands were articles that explicitly highlighted the Indonesian perspective on the colonial past. Between 2016 and 2019 Hoek advocated for recognition of the political struggle by the leaders of the Indonesian fight for independence, and other dissenting voices that had challenged the colonial system. In addition, she regularly campaigned for Dutch recognition of the date of Indonesian independence. In 2018 she called upon prime minister Mark Rutte and King Willem-Alexander of the Netherlands in NRC Handelsblad to take responsibility and make a large gesture for the fact that the Netherlands had picked up their weapons against Indonesia and that their long-term desire for independence had been structurally ignored. Early 2020, she and another historian advocated on Dutch national television in Nieuwsuur in favor of an apology by the Dutch king during his state visit to Indonesia. Contrary to expectations, the apology came nevertheless. Hoek responded again in Nieuwsuur.

In October 2020, Hoek received the ASH Valorization Prize from the University of Amsterdam for her contributions to the public debate on Indonesia. The same year she co-published an article in the Groene Amsterdammer revealing that the Netherlands obtained more financial benefits to finance their reconstruction after World War II from the transfer of sovereignty to Indonesia – over 103 billion euros – than the 16 billion euros from the Marshall Plan from the United States. Authors like David Van Reybrouck and Adriaan van Dis and other authors and scientists highlighted this research in their work. It was picked up in Indonesia as well.

Since 2021 Hoek has been editorial board member of history at the quarterly Flemish-Dutch magazine De lage landen, which has reported on language, the arts, literature, history and society in the Low Countries since 1957. She has also contributed to their book publication Nulpunt 1945 Zero Point 1945. In November 2021 De strijd om Bali ('The Battle for Bali') was published.

Early February 2022 De Indische Doofpot was published with the main question why Dutch war crimes in Indonesia have never been prosecuted. In the conclusion of this prizewinning book it is stated – that "it is now established – after the groundbreaking publications of Remy Limpach and Anne-Lot Hoek – that the Dutch military apparatus systematically carried out a practice of mass executions and torture in prison camps, all under the ultimate responsibility of the Dutch government in The Hague". A few days later Hoek gave a lecture during the event Freedom and Resistance. The legacy of the revolution is still alive. She was also interviewed on political current affairs television program Buitenhof on her debut, on the opening of Revolusi!: a large exhibition within the Rijksmuseum in Amsterdam on Indonesia's struggle for independence to which she also made a contribution, and about the possible conclusions of the formerly mentioned "ODGOI"-research on the same war. She was the only Dutch researcher in the "ODGOI"-project, who did not participate in writing those conclusions.

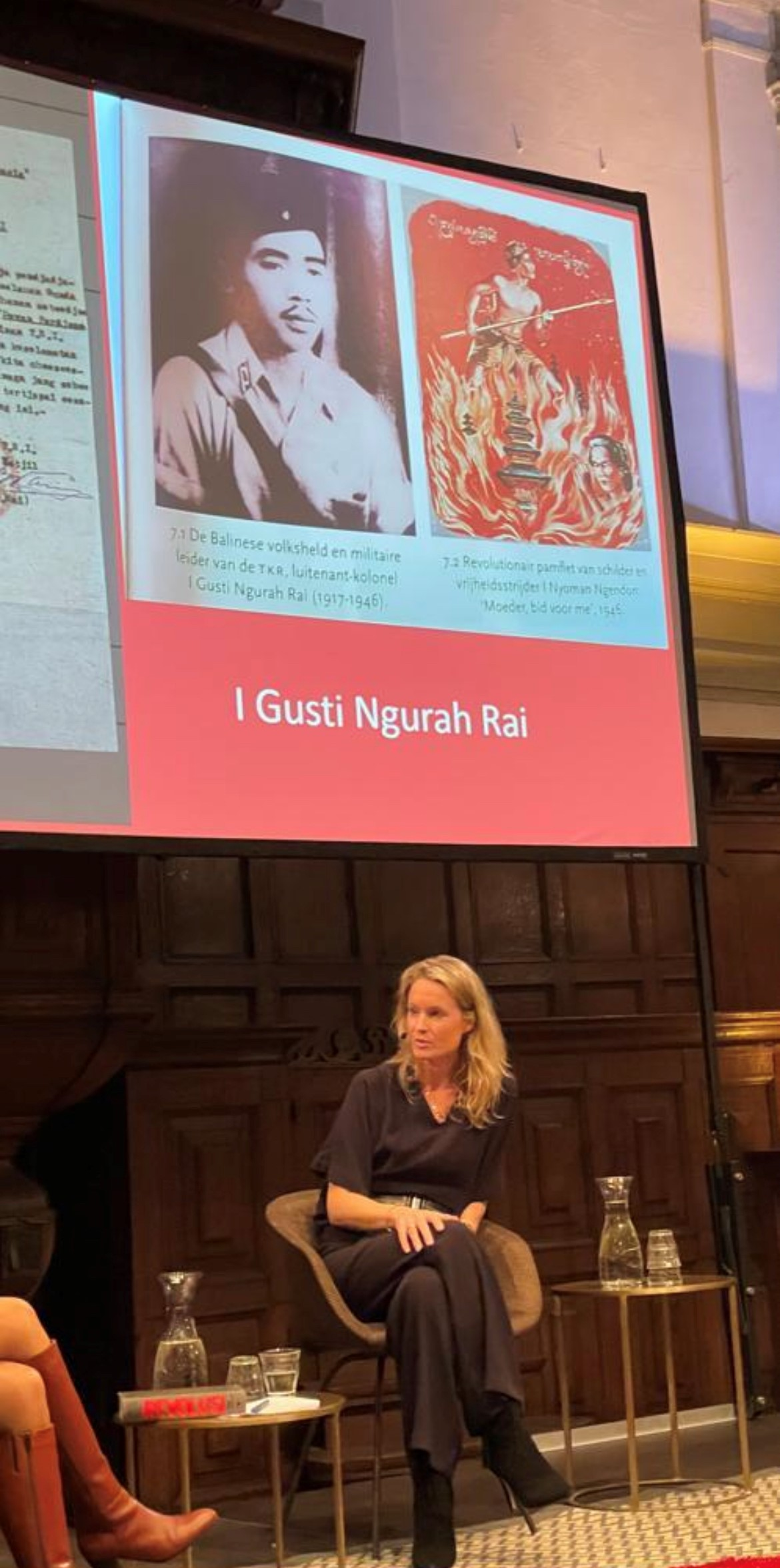
Anne-Lot Hoek about I Gusti Ngurah Rai during 'Freedom and Resistance' in De Rode Hoed (Amsterdam, February 16th, 2022)

Together with other critics and Indonesia experts, in response to the final conclusion of that investigation, she again advocated in favor of the usage of the term "war crimes" during a special on NPO Radio 1. The investigation leader, Frank van Vree, changed his position during the broadcast and believed that they should have spoken of war crimes after all, which in itself became national news again the same day.

In February 2023 Hoek received her PhD at the University of Amsterdam. Since March that year she has been a regular book reviewer at the Historische Boekencast, the podcast of Historisch Nieuwsblad in the Netherlands. In June she published an article in NRC Handelsblad together with Ni Made Frischa Aswarini and Ni Ketut Sudiani, who both had supported Hoek on multiple fronts in her research in Bali, in which they together argued for the return of documents from the National Archives to Indonesia. A week later a motion was submitted in the House of Representatives for the return of archive documents to Indonesia, which was adopted. As a reaction to the political debate in the House of Representatives about the results of the aforementioned ODGOI research, Hoek wrote a critical essay in the De Groene Amsterdammer and she responded in the press to intermediate results. She also made a contribution to the exposition and book for De Grote Indonesië tentoonstelling in the Nieuwe Kerk. Since July she has been in Namibia and South Africa doing research for her new book.

Hoek is currently a fellow at the International Institute of Social History in Amsterdam, The Netherlands, where she continued her research on South-Africa and Namibia.

=== Importance of research ===
Her work was regularly highlighted in De kolonie mept terug ('The Colony Strikes Back', 2024), the reading journey on colonialism and the Indonesian revolution by Adriaan van Dis, who claims to have derived most of his insights from De strijd om Bali, which he calls “ingenious”, “a revelation” and a “mind-blowing” book. He refers to her as “an important writer” and states "what makes her work innovative - in addition to the many Balinese testimonies - is that she has exposed the connection between violence and colonial politics. East Indonesia played a much more important role in the revolution than previously assumed and that is why, among other things, so much violence was used in Bali". Up until that point the focus of historians had mainly been on Java.

David van Reybrouck (PhD) stated that Anne-Lot Hoek 'has conducted important oral history research on Sumatra and especially Bali'. Maurice Swirc highlighted that he drew in particular on her publications for his prize-winning book De Indische Doofpot and called her work "groundbreaking". Hoek wrote, according to Jan Brokken "the standard work", historian and book reviewer Nadia Bouras calls it "already a classic", and the non-fiction book reviewer of Dutch national newspaper NRC Handelsblad called it "potentially the most important history book of the year" .

The jury of the Libris History Prize described De strijd om Bali as an important contribution to the scholarly and social debate on colonial policy in Indonesia. From a scientific perspective, Karwan Fatah-Black placed Hoek's work at the forefront of the academic mainstream and called her work "groundbreaking" as well. Her most important role in stimulating the debate about violence in Indonesia was also scientifically recognized. She was awarded the ASH Valorisation prize 2019-2020 from the University of Amsterdam for her work on the Dutch colonial period in Indonesia and the decolonization of Indonesia. The Huizinga Instituut organised a workshop dedicated to her book, and deemed it specifically fascinating for Oral Historians.

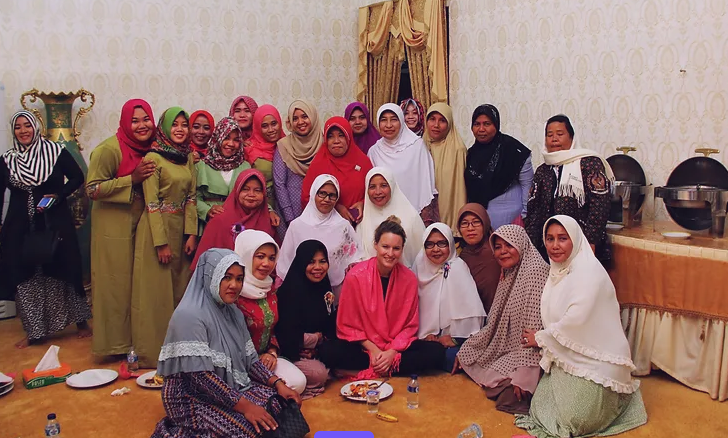
Anne-Lot Hoek performing research in Rengat, Sumatra, January 2016

In the Netherlands, Hoek opines there is very little attention paid to Indonesian perspectives. According to the former head of Research of the NIOD Institute for War, Holocaust and Genocide Studies Peter Romijn, and Remco Raben, many Dutch historical works and documentaries have a strong etnocentric perspective. Indonesian sources are hardly consulted, Indonesian experiences are not at all or only briefly presented and the motivations of Indonesian actors are rarely explored in depth. They state that in contrast to the above, De strijd om Bali from Anne-Lot Hoek is one of the exceptional books in which The Netherlands are confronted with the consequences of violence in general or the victims of violence specifically and where there is room for a critical perspective in her book. Nadia Bouras states about The Battle for Bali that the perspective of the colonized has been ignored for a long time, but that this has fortunately changed and that the book also shows how the colonial past clashes with the self-image that the Netherlands has had of itself.

Prof.dr. Marjan Schwegman acknowledged Hoeks work on the previously insufficiently researched role of armed Dutch administrative officials in the violence during the Indonesian War of Independence as part of her farewell speech 'The weapons of the resistance' at her departure as the head of the NIOD Institute for War, Holocaust and Genocide Studies. Hoek is also seen as one of the few authors that early on recognized the value of applying a ‘long-term perspective’ by commencing in colonial times as a prerequisite for understanding the Indonesian War of Independence. She also shows that violence, racism, exploitation, legal inequality and oppression were inherent to the colonial system as well. De strijd om Bali runs from 1846 to 1950 and also tells about the aftermath of the war.

Within Hoek's PhD committee, Indonesia expert Professor Geoffrey B. Robinson from the University of California, Los Angeles (UCLA), classified her work as important, deeply researched and intellectually significant and Professor Dr. Jan-Bart Gewald, former director of the African Studies Centre Leiden stated that what Harvard professor Caroline Elkins has done with Imperial Reckoning for Kenya, Hoek has done for Bali in regarding the role of the Dutch before 1950.

== Literature ==
=== Non-fiction ===
In November 2021 Anne-Lot Hoek debuted with De strijd om Bali. Imperialisme, verzet en onafhankelijkheid 1846–1950 at the De Bezige Bij.

De strijd om Bali ('The Battle for Bali') was awarded Best History Book of the Month on NPO Radio 1, received an exceptional honorary mention by the Jury of the Brusse Prize, and was selected from a list of more than three hundred titles into the top five shortlist of the Libris History Prize 2022.

In collaboration with Alle Geschiedenis Ooit ('All History Ever'), the four-episode podcast series War in Paradise: The Battle for Bali was created about the book by Anne-Lot Hoek and Arco Gnocchi. They provide insight into the war through personal stories of four people involved.

== Bibliography ==
=== Books ===
- De strijd om Bali. Imperialisme, verzet en onafhankelijkheid 1846–1950, Anne-Lot Hoek, Nov 2021, Amsterdam, De Bezige Bij, ISBN 9403152311

=== Book contributions ===
- Atlas van Indonesië. Een cultuurgeschiedenis van het eilandenrijk. De strijd om Bali. Vrijheidsstrijders in Gianyar, Ni Ketut Sudiani, Anne-Lot Hoek and Ni Made Frischa Aswarini, Amsterdam WBOOKS, 2023, ISBN 9789462585737
- Revolusi! Indonesië Onafhankelijk. Harm Stevens, Amir Sidharta, Bonnie Triyana, Marion Anker (eds.), Amsterdam Rijksmuseum, 2022, ISBN 9789045045733
- Nulpunt 1945. De Lage Landen een mensenleven later. Een façade van zindelijk fatsoen. De Nederlandse omgang met het koloniale verleden, Anne-Lot Hoek, Ons Erfdeel Vzw, Belgium, April 2020, ISBN 9789079705313
- Multatuli Jaarboek 2020. Jubileumnummer '200 jaar Multatuli', Uitgeverij Verloren, 2020, ISBN 9789087049003

=== Scientific books and publications ===
- Hoek, Anne-Lot (10 February 2023).De strijd om Bali. Geweld, verzet en koloniale staatsvorming 1846–1950 (The Battle for Bali. Violence, Resistance and Colonial State Formation 1846–1950).
- Hoek, Anne-Lot (2 February 2023). Purwanto, Bambang; Frakking, Roel; Wahid, Abdul; Van Klinken, Gerry; Eickhoff, Martijn; Yulianti; Hoogenboom, Ireen (eds.). Revolutionary Worlds: Local Perspectives and Dynamics during the Indonesian Independence War, 1945-1949. Translated by Hanafi, Taufiq. Amsterdam University Press, ISBN 9789463727587. DOI: https://doi.org/10.2307/jj.399493.11.
- Maartje Janse & Anne-Lot Hoek. Dissenting Voices: Challenging the Colonial System. (in cooperation with E. Jansz and S. Sijsma), Bridging Humanities. (2019) Vol 1: Issue 2. Sutan Sjahrir: Indonesian revolutionary, Anne-Lot Hoek, Leiden, Brill Publishers, E-SSN 2542–5099. DOI: https://doi.org/10.1163/25425099-00102001
- Maartje Janse & Anne-Lot Hoek. Dissenting Voices: Challenging the Colonial System. (in cooperation with E. Jansz and S. Sijsma), Bridging Humanities. (2019) Vol 1: Issue 2, Siebe Lijftogt: a critical voice branded a traitor, Anne-Lot Hoek, Leiden, Brill Publishers, E-SSN 2542–5099. DOI: https://doi.org/10.1163/25425099-00102001
- Maartje Janse & Anne-Lot Hoek. Dissenting Voices: Challenging the Colonial System. (in cooperation with E. Jansz and S. Sijsma), Bridging Humanities. (2019) Vol 1: Issue 2, Rachmad Koesoemobroto: fighting for freedom, a life imprisoned, Anne-Lot Hoek, Leiden, Brill Publishers, E-SSN 2542–5099. DOI: https://doi.org/10.1163/25425099-00102001
- Maartje Janse & Anne-Lot Hoek. Dissenting Voices: Challenging the Colonial System. (in cooperation with E. Jansz and S. Sijsma), Bridging Humanities. (2019) Vol 1: Issue 2, Cees Fasseur and his critics, Anne-Lot Hoek, Leiden, Brill Publishers, E-SSN 2542–5099. DOI: https://doi.org/10.1163/25425099-00102001
- Maartje Janse & Anne-Lot Hoek. Dissenting Voices: Challenging the Colonial System. (in cooperation with E. Jansz and S. Sijsma), Bridging Humanities. (2019) Vol 1: Issue 2, The way forward, Anne-Lot Hoek, Leiden, Brill Publishers, E-SSN 2542–5099. DOI: https://doi.org/10.1163/25425099-00102001
- Exploring the Dutch Empire. Agents, Networks and Institutions 1600–2000, Catia Antunes and Jos Gommans (eds.), Nodal Ndola, Robert Ross and Anne-Lot Hoek, Londen, UK: Bloomsbury Academic, 2015, ISBN 9781474236416, DOI: https://doi.org/10.1177/0265691417729639a
- From Idealism to Realism: A Social History of the Dutch in Zambia 1965–2013, Anne-Lot Hoek, African Studies Centre Leiden, 2014, ISBN 9789054481393, WorldCat: 1235771932
- Bricks, Mortar and Capacity Building: A Socio-Cultural History of SNV Netherlands Development Organisation, Inge Brinkman in cooperation with Anne-Lot Hoek, Leiden: Brill Publishers, 2010, ISBN 9789004187412, DOI: https://doi.org/10.1163/ej.9789004187412.i-327
