= Gerbong Maut incident =

Gerbong Maut
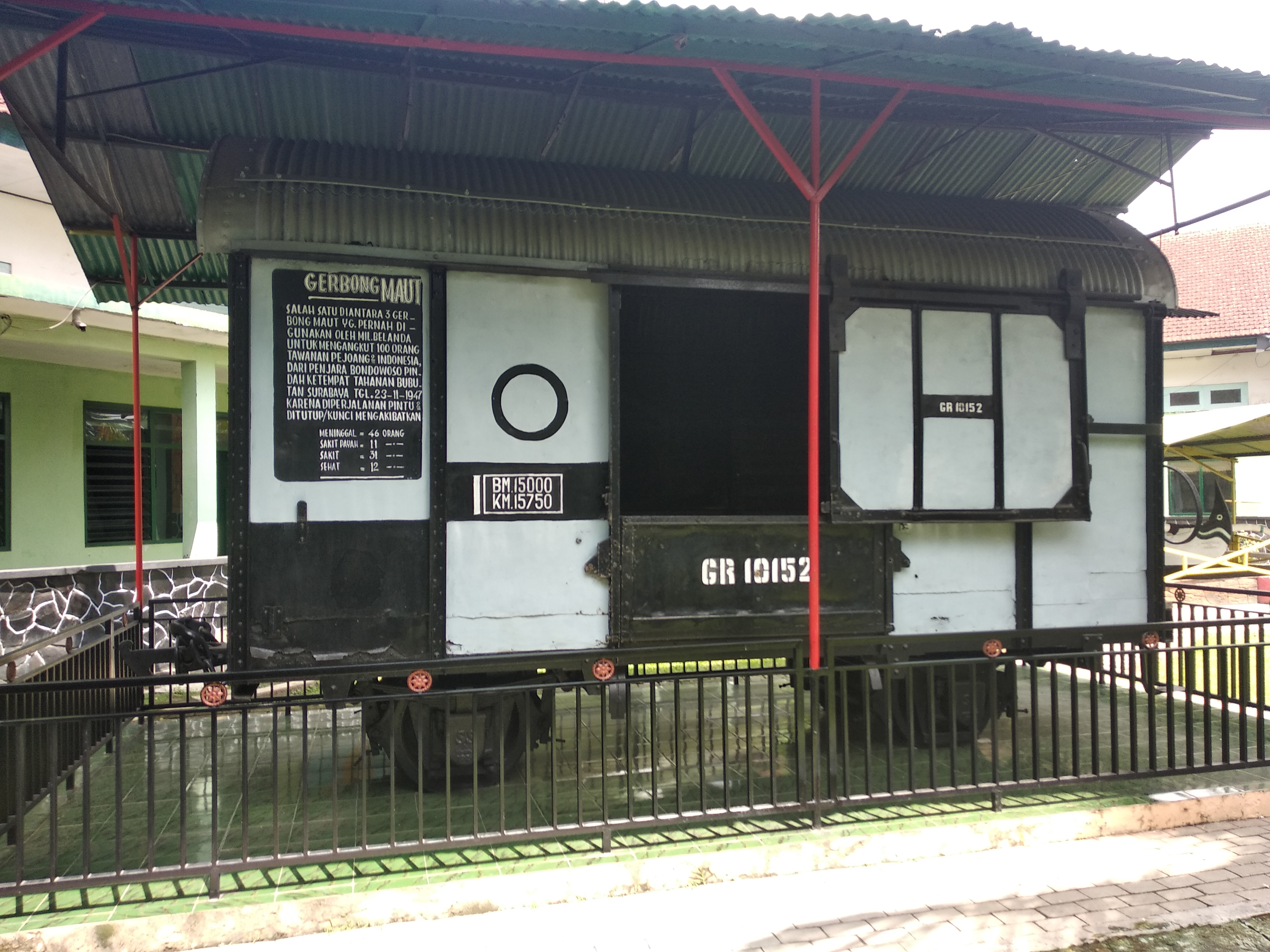
- One of the "Gerbong Maut", preserved at Brawijaya Museum
- Location: 7.971882°S 112.620745°E; Bondowoso, Indonesia
- Date: 23 November 1947
- Deaths: 46
- Perpetrator: Dutch soldiers

The Gerbong Maut incident (lit. 'Death Carriage incident'), also known as the Bondowoso death train or in Dutch Bondowoso-affaire, is a historical incident that occurred on 23 November 1947 in Bondowoso, Indonesia during Dutch occupation.

In the midst of the guerrilla war between the people of Bondowoso and the Dutch colonial forces, 100 men were arrested on suspicion of being revolutionaries. The men where stuffed into 3 railway cars headed from the Bondowoso train station to the Kalisosok Prison in Surabaya, about 250 kilometers away because of alleged overcrowding at the local jail. The sealed cars, made of timber and corrugated iron, allowed little oxygen and created an extreme heat.

Based on the testimony of one of the survivors, when the train stopped at sidings along the 16-hour journey, the prisoners hit the walls and shouted for food and water. They were told only bullets were available and nothing would be supplied until the train reached Surabaya. However, when the train reached its destination only 12 were left unharmed by lack of oxygen and heat stress. All the men in the first car were alive though some were seriously sick. In the second car, eight were dead. In the last wagon no one had survived.

== Monument ==
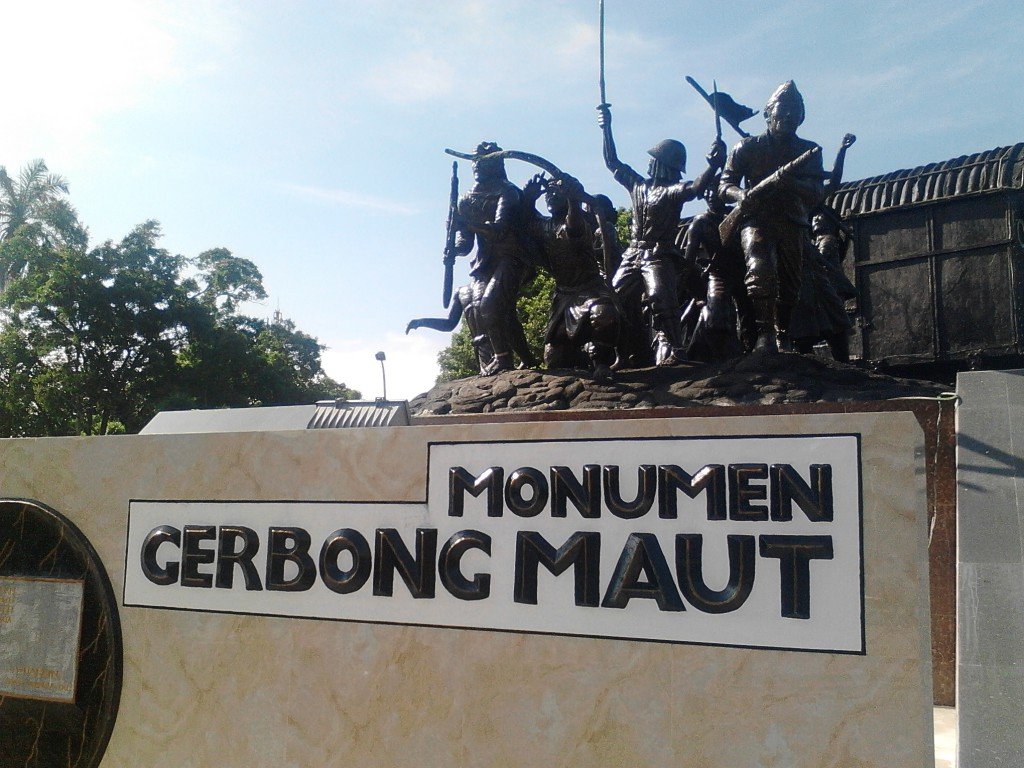
The Gerbong Maut Monument

The monument is located in the centre of the city of Bondowoso, between the alun-alun (city central square) and the regency government office. The monument consists of two parts, a railway car and a statue representing the hundred prisoners of the Gerbong Maut. The railway car is a replica and the original car is displayed at the Brawijaya Army Museum in Malang.

== See also ==
- Police Actions (Indonesia)
- South Sulawesi campaign of 1946–1947
- Rawagede massacre
- Rengat massacre
