= Rawagede massacre =

1947 Dutch killing in the Indonesian National Revolution

- Part of Indonesian National Revolution and the Operation Product
- Location: 6°15′S 107°17′E; Rawagede (present-day Balongsari, West Java)
- Date: 9 December 1947; 78 years ago (UTC+7)
- Target: Villagers
- Attack type: Massacre
- Deaths: 431
- Perpetrator: Royal Netherlands East Indies Army: Alphons Wijnen

The Rawagede massacre (Dutch: Bloedbad van Rawagede, Indonesian: Pembantaian Rawagede) was committed by the Royal Netherlands East Indies Army on 9 December 1947 in the village of Rawagede (now Balongsari in Rawamerta district, Karawang Regency, West Java). Forces of the Royal Netherlands East Indies Army were battling Indonesian Republican army fighters TNI and militia forces seeking independence for Indonesia. Almost all males from the village, amounting to 431 men according to most estimates, were killed by the Royal Netherlands East Indies Army because the villagers refused to disclose the whereabouts of the Indonesian independence fighter Lukas Kustaryo.

== Background ==
The Dutch faced international pressure following Operation Product, their first Police Action against the Indonesian Republican forces, prompting Dutch Lt. Governor-General Van Mook to order a ceasefire on 5 August 1947. Mediated by the Committee of Good Offices (CGO), a panel of representatives from Australia, Belgium, and the United States, negotiations between the Dutch and Indonesian forces began on 8 December 1947 aboard the USS Renville. Despite ongoing negotiations, the Dutch continued their campaign against the Indonesian army.

== Massacre ==
On 9 December 1947, a day after the start of the Renville negotiations, a Dutch army unit consisting of about 100 conscripts under the command of Major Alphons Wijnen attacked Rawagede village and raided houses. They had been ordered to "clean up" the village but failed to locate members of the Indonesian army. This prompted the soldiers to force villagers out of their homes and gather them in a field. Men above the age of 15 were ordered to stand side by side and were interrogated about the presence of Republican fighters.

On that day, the Dutch army executed 431 people in Rawagede without legal inquiry, trial, or defense. These executions, described as summary executions, are clearly categorized as war crimes, involving the murder of non-combatants.

== Aftermath ==
The massacre was reported to the CGO. However, the commission’s reaction was limited to criticism of the military action, which they described as "deliberate and ruthless." No strict sanctions were imposed for the human rights abuses, nor was the massacre treated as a war crime against innocent civilians.

A report from the United Nations, published on 12 January 1948, called the killings "deliberate and merciless." Although Dutch Army General Simon Hendrik Spoor recommended prosecuting the responsible officer, Major Alphons Wijnen, no criminal investigation was initiated. The Attorney General justified this by stating that "foreign interference and interest has waned."

== Legacy ==
In 2006, Jeffry Pondaag, organizer of the Dutch Honorary Debts Committee Foundation, collaborated with lawyer Liesbeth Zegveld, an expert on international law and war crimes, to represent the Rawagede widows. Their goal was to secure recognition, apologies, and compensation from the Netherlands. At the time, there was no precedent for such a case, making the pursuit of justice uncertain.

On 8 September 2008, a dialogue began with 10 widows of massacre victims formally requesting acknowledgment of Dutch responsibility. In a response dated 24 November 2008, the Dutch state expressed "deep regret" for the massacre but argued that the term for prosecution had expired. This position drew criticism from members of the States-General of the Netherlands and leading Dutch newspapers, such as NRC Handelsblad, which argued that there should be no statute of limitations for war crimes.

In December 2009, the 10 widows decided to sue the Dutch state in court. On 14 September 2011, the court ruled that the extraordinary nature of the crime exempted it from a statute of limitations. The Dutch state was held fully accountable for the damages caused. Following settlement negotiations, the plaintiffs were awarded €20,000 each in compensation, and the Dutch state issued a formal apology for the massacre.

On 9 December 2011, the Dutch ambassador to Indonesia stated, "We remember the members of your families and those of your fellow villagers who died 64 years ago through the actions of the Dutch military... On behalf of the Dutch government, I apologize for the tragedy that took place." Only nine relatives were still alive at the time, and they each received €20,000 in compensation. The money was paid out by 2013.

On 10 July 2012, the massacre received public attention in the Netherlands after de Volkskrant published two photos of an execution. These photos are the only documented images of the massacre conducted by the Royal Netherlands East Indies Army.

In 2016, Dutch Foreign Minister Bert Koenders visited Rawagede to apologize in person.

== See also ==
- Decision by the district court of The Hague (14 September 2011), ECLI:NL:RBSGR:2011:BS8793
- Police Actions (Indonesia)
- South Sulawesi campaign of 1946–1947
- Gerbong Maut incident
- Rengat massacre
