= KUKB =

KUKB may refer to:

- Dutch Honorary Debts Committee Foundation (Yayasan Komite Utang Kehormatan Belanda), an interest group for victims of Dutch colonialism in Indonesia
- KYGL (formerly KUKB), a radio station broadcasting in Texarkana, Arkansas, United States
