= Bondowoso Rail and Train Museum =

Bondowoso Station Stasiun Bondowoso
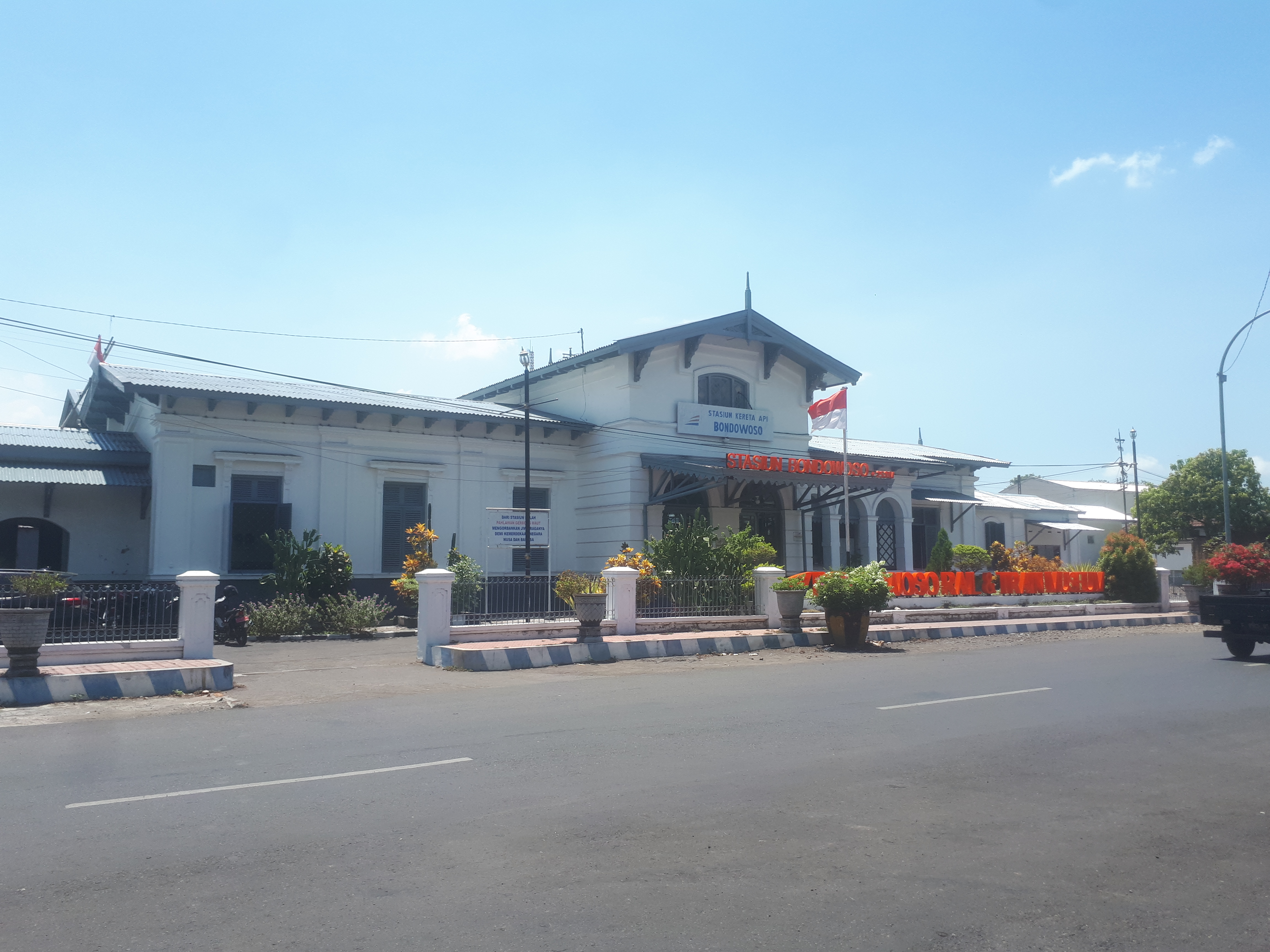
- Bondowoso Rail and Train Museum, 2019

General information
- Location: Jalan Imam Bonjol, Kademangan, Bondowoso, Bondowoso Regency; East Java; Indonesia
- Coordinates: 7°55′01″S 113°49′46″E
- Elevation: +253 m (830 ft)
- Owner: Kereta Api Indonesia
- Operator: Kereta Api Indonesia
- Line: Kalisat–Panarukan (closed)
- Platforms: 1 island platform 1 side platform
- Tracks: 2

Construction
- Structure type: Ground
- Parking: Available
- Accessible: Available

Other information
- Station code: BO • 5607

History
- Opened: 1 October 1897
- Closed: 2004
Location
- Location within Java

Bondowoso Rail and Train Museum Museum Kereta Api Bondowoso
- Interactive map
- Established: 17 August 2016
- Location: Jl. Imam Bonjol, Kademangan, Bondowoso, Bondowoso Regency, East Java, Indonesia
- Coordinates: 7°55′01″S 113°49′46″E
- Type: Railway museum
- Owner: Kereta Api Indonesia

The Bondowoso Rail and Train Museum, (Indonesian: Museum Kereta Api Bondowoso, lit. 'Bondowoso Railway Museum') is a museum located in the town of Bondowoso, Bondowoso Regency in East Java, Indonesia. The museum is located at the former Bondowoso Station, opened by Staatsspoorwegen on 1 October 1897 and was closed in 2004, along with the Kalisat–Panarukan railway line. The disused station was reopened as museum on 17 August 2016.

The museum was opened to commemorate the Gerbong Maut incident during the 1st Dutch Military Aggression in Indonesian National Revolution. Before dawn on 23 November 1947, 100 Indonesian prisoners of war held in Bondowoso Prison by Dutch forces were moved to the Bondowoso Station to be transported to Wonokromo Station in Surabaya via train. The prisoners were loaded into three small two-axle covered goods wagons. After the 16 hours journey through the hot tropical sun in the unventilated wagons without food or water, 46 prisoners died with 12 critically ill, 30 unconscious and 12 survived.

== Services ==
There are no train service at this station, as the railway line connected to the station was closed in 2004. After reopening as a museum, Bondowoso Station serves train ticket bookings, however the practice has been discontinued since 1 January 2021 amidst the COVID-19 pandemic.

== See also ==
- List of museums and cultural institutions in Indonesia
- Ambarawa Railway Museum

Preceding station	Kereta Api Indonesia	Following station
~~Grujugan~~ towards Kalisat	Kalisat–Panarukan (Closed)	~~Bonosare~~ towards ~~Panarukan~~
