= Dutch Honorary Debts Committee Foundation =

Dutch and Indonesian interest group

- Yayasan Komite Utang Kehormatan Belanda; Stichting Comité Nederlandse Ereschulden
- Abbreviation: KUKB
- Formation: 5 May 2005; 21 years ago
- Legal status: Foundation
- Purpose: Advocacy group
- Location: Heemskerk, the Netherlands
- Chairperson: J.M. Pondaag
- Website: www.kukb.nl

The Dutch Honorary Debts Committee Foundation (KUKB, Indonesian: Yayasan Komite Utang Kehormatan Belanda; Dutch: Stichting Comité Nederlandse Ereschulden) is an independent interest group in the Netherlands and Indonesia for victims of Dutch colonialism in the former Dutch East Indies (1603–1949), in particular within the context of the Indonesian National Revolution of 1945–1949.

The KUKB formed in the Netherlands on 5 May 2005 and became a foundation on 4 April 2007. It has an Indonesian presence in Jakarta and in the provinces of West Java, South Sulawesi, and West Sulawesi.

== Purpose ==
The stated goals of the Dutch Honorary Debts Committee Foundation are:

- to represent the interests of the Indonesian civilian victims who suffered during the Dutch colonial period from the violence of the colonial regime and the war crimes committed by the Dutch military under the responsibility of the Dutch government;
- to receive legal recognition from the Dutch government for the proclamation of Indonesian Independence on 17 August 1945, rather than the date of the cession of sovereignty on 27 December 1949, following the Dutch–Indonesian Round Table Conference;
- for the Indonesian nation to receive a full-throated apology, issued by the Dutch government, not only for the acts of "extreme violence" between 1945 and 1949, but for all the crimes the Netherlands committed during its 350-year presence in the Indonesian Archipelago;
- to receive acknowledgment from the Dutch government for the Indonesian victims, and acknowledgment of and restitution for war damages, plundering, and disregard for human rights in their widest sense.

== Advocacy ==
The Dutch Honorary Debts Committee Foundation, represented on a pro bono basis by human rights lawyer Liesbeth Zegveld, fought its first successful legal battle on behalf of seven widows of men summarily executed by the Royal Netherlands East Indies Army (KNIL) under Major Alphons Wijnen during the Rawagede massacre of 9 December 1947. On 14 September 2011, the court in The Hague ruled that the Dutch government was to offer a public apology and reparations to the still living relatives of the 431 victims of the massacre.

Further recognition and compensation for Indonesian war victims followed as the KUKB continues to advocate for the surviving relatives of up to 3,500 Indonesians summarily executed during the South Sulawesi campaign of 1946–1947 under KNIL Captain Raymond Westerling.

On 15 August 2021, the Dutch Honorary Debts Committee Foundation announced that Liesbeth Zegveld had stopped taking on new cases for the foundation since earlier that year, citing time constraints and increased criticism from chairman Pondaag. Upon inquiry by radio show De Nieuws BV, Zegveld confirmed having ended her cooperation with the foundation over difficulties working with Pondaag.

=== Bersiap controversy ===
On 10 January 2022, Dutch newspaper NRC published an opinion piece by Bonnie Triyana, Indonesian historian and guest curator at the Rijksmuseum in Amsterdam, which called into question the usage of the term Bersiap in the then-upcoming exhibition "Revolusi! Indonesia Independent". In the Dutch historiography of the Indonesian Revolution, Bersiap ('get ready' or 'be prepared' in Malay) refers to a period of Indonesian revolutionary and ethnic violence lasting from August 1945 until at least November 1947, but Triyana claimed that the curation team had agreed to omit the word as it would "simplify" the narrative and reinforce stereotypes of "primitive, uncivilized Indonesians". In response, the Federation of Dutch Indos (FIN, Federatie Indische Nederlanders) accused Triyana of "runaway wokeism" and filed a police report against him for stigmatizing the survivors of the Bersiap killings and downplaying the extent of violence against Europeans, Indos, Chinese, Moluccans, and other demographies. At the request of the FIN, representatives of the political parties JA21, Party for Freedom, Farmer–Citizen Movement, and Christian Democratic Appeal also spoke out against "historical falsification" and "genocide denial" over the following days and the Rijksmuseum publicly distanced itself from Triyana's statements on 14 January.

On 21 January 2022, the Dutch Honorary Debts Committee Foundation became involved when it filed a police report against the Rijksmuseum, its director, and the lead curator of the exhibition for their intention to continue using the term Bersiap, which the KUKB too considers to have racist connotations. On 9 February, the Public Prosecution Service (OM, Openbaar Ministerie) dismissed the police reports of both the FIN and the KUKB, clarifying that Bonnie Triyana had exercised his right to free speech to contribute to the public debate, and that prosecutors concluded Bersiap to be a valid descriptor of historical events and that its use, too, is covered by the right to freedom of expression. The Dutch Honorary Debts Committee Foundation announced on 4 July it had filed a complaint with the Amsterdam Court of Appeal and chairman Jeffry M. Pondaag, secretary Dida Pattipilohy, and historian Marjolein van Pagee presented their arguments in a hearing on 13 October. On 5 January 2023, the court rejected the complaint of KUKB and reaffirmed the verdict of the OM.

== See also ==
- Indonesia–Netherlands relations
- Dutch East Indies
- Indonesian National Revolution
- Police Actions (Indonesia)
