= Alphons Wijnen =

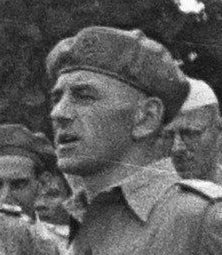
Major A.J.H. Wijnen in 1949

Alphonse Jean Henri (Fons) Wijnen (Lieze, Visé, (Belgium), 7 June 1912 – Leende, 7 March 2001) was a Dutch soldier. He was the officer in charge when the Rawagede massacre took place during the Indonesian National Revolution in which Dutch troops killed over 400 Indonesian civilians.

== World War II ==
Wijnen was born as the eldest in a family of ten children. He married and had two children before World War II broke out. After the war he had two children. During the war he fled as Engelandvaarder, through France and Spain to Britain.

== Rawagede massacre ==
After the war, Wijnen was sent to the Dutch East Indies for three years and served with the Royal Dutch East Indies Army during the Indonesian National Revolution. He was involved in a massacre in Rawagede. Despite the recommendation of General Simon Spoor that Wijnen stand trial as a war criminal, in 1947, Dutch Attorney General Hendrik Willem Felderhof decided not to prosecute him for the massacre. The Attorney General stated that his reasons were "because foreign interference and interest has waned."

== Post Indonesian independence ==
Major Wijnen was promoted to colonel and appointed battalion commander to the Major General de Ruyter of Steveninck Barracks in Oirschot and later as garrison commander of Eindhoven.

Colonel Wijnen was an Officer in the Order of Orange-Nassau with swords.
