= Batu kenong =

Type of Indonesian megalith

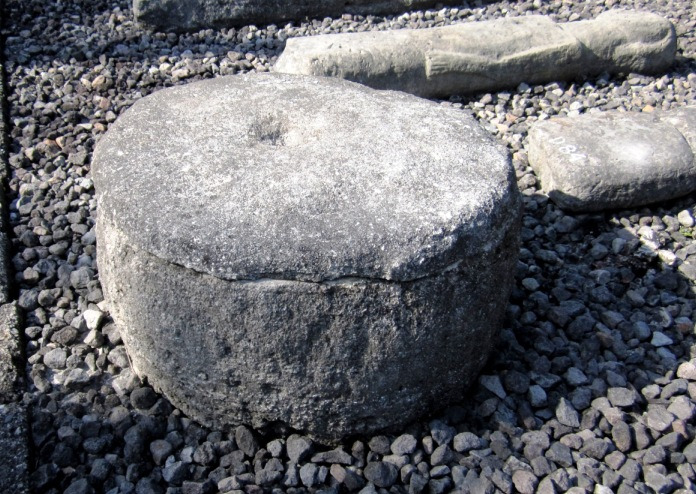
A batu kenong in the Bleberan Pooling Site, Gunungkidul Regency.

Batu kenongs, also known as kenong stones, are a type of megalith found in Indonesia. They became prevalent sometime between the Neolithic period and early Iron Age as megalithic culture spread to Indonesia. Archeological research on the stones began in the late 19th century and continues to the present day. There is much uncertainty in how they came to Indonesia, but they are believed to have been used to support buildings.

== Definition ==
Betu kenongs are upright cylindrical or rounded stones and receive their name from their physical resemblance to the kenong, a gamelan music instrument. They are described as "cylindrical stones with a knob on top", and classified into three separate categories: those with a single cylindrical knob, those with two cylindrical knobs, and those with rounded knobs.

Excavations have revealed betu kenongs in patterns of rectangles and circles, which has led archeologists to believe they were used for foundations of structures. Along with their organization, the archeological excavation done by Willems in 1938 has continued to support this theory. The excavation found two different purposes for Kenong stones, each used in conjunction to create a foundation. Kenong stones surrounding structures were used to support bamboo stilts in which a bamboo pole would be placed onto the knobs of the stone. Conversely, stones in the center of the construction were used to carry the majority of the house's weight. The stones in the center were supported by a large stone tab; the weight was transferred to it from the kenong stones, creating a steady foundation. This, along with the arrangement of stones in a circular or rectangular pattern, helps to solidify their use as building implements.

== History ==
Megaliths can be seen all over Indonesia, spreading from the East to the West. However, even with such a large distribution historians have yet to be able to exactly pinpoint a time and reason for the introduction of megaliths into the region. Theories suggest the culture started in Asia, Ancient Egypt, or along the Mediterranean. Overall, most attribute the appearance of megaliths to cultural diffusion sometime between the Neolithic and early Iron Ages.

Bondowoso, located in the Java region, has attracted much archeological attention for its large number of megaliths. 1898 marked the first documentation of the artifacts in the area and led to the Kenong stone, along with three other megaliths, first being classified for its distinct characteristics. More excavation and research into the early 1940s generated interest in megaliths in Indonesia, leading to a new wave of investigation by the National Research Centre of Archeology after World War 2. This new research discovered 47 megalithic sites in Bondowoso, 13 of them containing Batu kenongs.
