= South Sulawesi campaign of 1946–1947 =

Battle between Indonesian and Dutch forces during the Indonesian National Revolution

South Sulawesi Campaign
- Part of the Indonesian National Revolution
Date	10 December 1946 – 21 February 1947 (2 months, 1 week and 4 days)
Location	South Sulawesi, Dutch East Indies
Result	Dutch victory

Belligerents
Indonesia	Netherlands

Commanders and leaders
Sam Ratulangi; Andi Abdullah Bau Massepe †; Ranggong Daeng Romo †; Andi Mattalata (executed); Lieutenant Latief (POW)	Captain Westerling; Colonel De Vries

Units involved
Tentara Republik Indonesia (TRI); Indonesian People's Rebel Army of Sulawesi (LAPRIS)	Depot Special Forces (DST); Royal Netherlands East Indies Army (KNIL); Police units Village guards

Strength
100 TRI troops	123 DST troops

Casualties and losses
Unknown, likely heavy	3 DST troops killed Unknown number of KNIL soldiers and members of village guards and police units killed
- Between 3,100 and 3,500 civilians killed by Dutch troops, with some summarily executed, and approximately 1,500 killed by TRI troops

The South Sulawesi Campaign (10 December 1946 – 21 February 1947) was a campaign during the Indonesian National Revolution. It was a counter-insurgency offensive of the special forces of the KNIL against Indonesian infiltrations from Java and pro-Indonesian local militias. It was masterminded by the controversial Raymond Westerling, a captain in the KNIL (Royal Netherlands East Indies Army). Westerling's operation, which started in December 1946 and ended in February 1947, succeeded in eliminating the insurgency and undermining local support for the Republicans by instituting summary executions of suspected enemy fighters.

== Background of the insurgency ==
Between 1816 and 1905, the Dutch consolidated their control over the Bugis states of South Sulawesi. By 1911, the Dutch had integrated the entire region into the Dutch East Indies. Dutch rule was interrupted by the Japanese invasion of the East Indies during World War Two. During the Japanese occupation of the Dutch East Indies, Sulawesi along with much of eastern Indonesia was administrated by the Imperial Japanese Navy which sought to suppress local Republican and nationalist movements in contrast to the Army-dominated occupations of Java and Sumatra. Following the Japanese surrender in August 1945, the nationalist movement in Sulawesi established contact with Sukarno's Republican administration in Java.

However, allied forces were already present in Borneo before the proclamation and the NICA established control according to the Van Mook–MacArthur Civil Affairs Agreement. By 5 April 1946, most of the local Republican administration including Governor Sam Ratulangi were imprisoned by the returning Dutch authorities. The Dutch also interned the pro-Republican aristocracy and their supporters. Despite this, resistance continued in the form of pro-Republican intellectuals and guerrillas, surviving nobility and Java-based militants. The Dutch downplayed the local resistance as manifestations of international Communism and Javanese domination, portraying the native populations as contented and resistant to revolutionary change.

When the British and Australian Allies left Sulawesi on 13 July 1946, the Dutch were also facing persistent violence. On 15 November 1946 the Linggadjati Agreement (Linggajati in modern Indonesian spelling) was concluded by the Dutch administration and the unilaterally declared Republic of Indonesia in the village of Linggajati, Kuningan Regency, near Cirebon in which the Dutch recognised the republic as exercising de facto authority in Java, Madura and Sumatra. Sulawesi (or Celebes) stayed De jure part of the Dutch East Indies.

In violation of the Linggadjati Agreement hundreds of freedom fighters from Java made the crossing to assist 'their brothers on Celebes', carrying enormous amounts of smuggled weapons. What made things even more confusing was that the resistance of the Indonesians became fragmented into all kinds of - competing - parties, which in turn sometimes entered into alliances with criminal gangs (Rampokkers). In Makassar, Goa, Takalar and Djeneponto, the" Tentara Lipan Badjeng"(The Badjeng Centipedes Army) was working had killed 309 enemies in a few months. Among all these enemies indicated by name, all Indonesian civilians, were also children. Besides this gang, the "Semoet Merah" (the Red Ant), who specialized in arson, operated in Makassar, but was also guilty of murder and kidnapping. In September 1946, the Gelarang of Pantjambeang was murdered on the way to Malino (shot and stabbed to death) with his entire family (18 people). In kampong Kandjilo a well was discovered with 80 heads. In Tolo, according to the Djannang of Parigi, about 20 people were slaughtered as buffalos and their corpses were thrown into the river. The method of killing by these Indonesian 'nationalistic' groups was to lay (or hold) the victim on the ground and cut his neck with a badik (dagger knife). In total, at least 1,210 people would have been murdered between June 1946 and July 1947 by these Indonesian fighter groups.

Despite the Malino Conference in July 1946 which established local federal states in Dutch-controlled parts of Indonesia, the Sulawesi government's effectiveness was weakened by the poor economic situation, agricultural famines and a non-existent civil administration. The Indonesian Republic in Java provided training for Sulawesi guerrillas and even dispatched Javanese forces, using the ports of Polongbangkeng and Barru for landing troops and supplies. By December 1946, Dutch authority in the island was limited to the confines of Makassar and on the verge of an absolute breakdown. Hundreds of government officials and members of the pro-Dutch Eurasian and Indo Chinese community, were attacked and killed. The KNIL garrisons, stationed on the island, were not able to provide protection.

== The "Westerling Method" ==
The failure of conventional tactics prompted the Netherlands East Indies government to dispatch the maverick counter-insurgency expert Raymond Westerling who initiated a three-month pacification campaign from December 1946 to February 1947. Earlier Dutch tactics had focused on temporarily detaining and releasing suspected guerrillas. In November 1946, British-trained commando Westerling had developed a contingent of commandos within the KNIL known as the Depot Special Forces (DST), which specialised in counter-insurgency warfare and interrogation.

According to Westerling, pacifying Sulawesi, without losing thousands of innocent lives could only be accomplished by instituting summary justice on the spot of suspected enemy fighters, who were generally executed. This became known as the "Westerling Method". Westerling ordered the registration of all Javanese arriving in Makassar due to the large numbers of Javanese participating in the Sulawesi resistance. He also used scouts to infiltrate local villages and to identify members of the resistance.

Based on their information and that of the Dutch military intelligence service, the DST surrounded one of more suspected villages during night, after which they drove the population to a central location. At daybreak, the operation began, often led by Westerling. Men would be separated from women and children. From the gathered information Westerling exposed certain people as terrorists and murderers. They were shot without any further investigation. Afterwards Westerling forced local communities to refrain from supporting guerillas by swearing on the Quran and established local self-defence units with some members recruited from former guerrillas deemed as "redeemable".

Westerling directed eleven operations throughout the campaign. He succeeded in eliminating the insurgency and undermining local support for the Republicans. His actions restored Dutch rule in southern Sulawesi. However, the Netherlands East Indies government and the Dutch army command soon realised that Westerling's notoriety led to growing public criticism. In April 1947 the Dutch government instituted an official inquiry of his controversial methods. Raymond Westerling was put on the sidelines. He was relieved of his duties in November 1948.

== Death toll ==
The Republican government claimed that Westerling was responsible for tens of thousands of deaths. Initially they had estimated the number of victims at 15,000, but later stated it was 40,000. A monument with the name Monumen Korban 40,000 Jiwa was erected in the city of Makassar to commemorate the victims of the campaign. Dutch historian Jaap de Moor blames the inflation of the death toll on the fact that Republican government used it as propaganda to draw attention from the world to their diplomatic and armed struggle against the Dutch. Mohammed Natzir of the Indonesian Historical Commission of the Armed Forces also calls the figure of 40,000 deaths fiction and a propaganda measure of the Republican government against the Dutch occupation of that time.

In his book De Zuid-Celebes Affaire: Kapitein Westerling en de standrechtelijke executies Dutch historian Willem IJzereef estimates that the actions of the DST cost about 1,500 Indonesian lives. About 400 of them were executed during actions led by Westerling himself, while the remaining 1,100 were killed during actions of his second in command. Another 1,500 deaths could be added by actions of other KNIL units. Approximately 900 Indonesians were killed by pro-Dutch police units and members of the village guards. IJzereef believes that Indonesian resistance caused around 1,500 victims.

Research by former military officer Bauke Geersing written down in Kapitein Raymond Westerling en de Zuid-Celebes-affaire (1946-1947), Mythe en werkelijkheid (Captain Raymond Westerling and the South Celebes Affair (1946-1947), Myth and Reality ) led to his belief that with regard to this period in South Celebes, there is a myth surrounding the behavior of Westerling and a distortion of history. Geersing used a research model based on 'contextual' historiography.

In 1969, Westerling gave an interview on TV. He admitted the war crimes but said he did not fear prosecution as he had the support of the Dutch government. Not a single Dutch broadcaster was willing to broadcast the interview. This was partly due to threats they had received. The interview was broadcast for the first time in 2012.

== Accusations of war crimes ==
Westerling has always defended his actions and denied accusations of war crimes. His memoirs, which he publiced in 1952, devote a chapter to his self-defense. "They painted me as a bloodthirsty monster, who attacked the people of Celebes by fire and sword and exposed all those, who in the interest of Indonesia's national independence resisted Dutch rule, to a merciless campaign of repression". Westerling stated he had based his tactics on the premise that he performed the role of policeman, combating terror: "I arrested terrorists, not because they acted as instigators of the Republican government... but because they made themselves guilty of open and unmistaken crimes...I never had them [his troops] bombard a village, nor did I take the hut of innocent under fire. I had executed some criminals, but nobody had died needlessly or wrongly by my doing.

In 1949, the Dutch–Indonesian agreement on transfer of power stipulated neither country would call the other on its wartime offences, thus ruling out any attempt by Indonesia to press for Westerling's extradition.

== Lawsuit against Dutch State ==
In 2013, the Dutch ambassador in Indonesia, apologized on behalf of the Dutch government. In 2014, the Dutch Honorary Debts Committee Foundation, represented by human rights lawyer Liesbeth Zegveld, filed a lawsuit against the Dutch state on behalf of widows and children of the murdered men. A Dutch court ruled in 2015 that the Dutch state was liable for damages because Sulawesi (Celebes until December 1946) had been Dutch territory at the time of the campaign, and its people inhabitants of the Kingdom of the Netherlands.

In March 2020, Hague District Court ordered the Dutch government to pay damage compensation ranging from €123 to €10,000 to relatives of 11 men executed in South Sulawesi campaign.

== See also ==
- Police Actions (Indonesia)
- Gerbong Maut incident
- Rawagede massacre
- Rengat massacre
