= Nadia Bouras =

Dutch historian of Moroccan descent

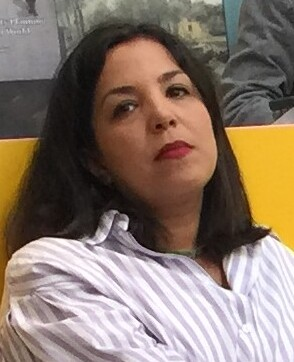
- Nadia Bouras (2023)
- Born: 1981 (age 44–45); Amsterdam, The Netherlands
- Occupation: Historian

Academic background
- Education: Vrije Universiteit Amsterdam

Academic work
- Discipline: History
- Sub-discipline: History of Morocco

Nadia Bouras (born 1981, Amsterdam, The Netherlands) is a Dutch historian of Moroccan descent. Bouras' work focuses on Moroccan history, migration history, and the history of the Moroccan diaspora in the Netherlands.

== Early life and education ==
Bouras, her twin sister, and her three other siblings were born in Amsterdam to Moroccan immigrants. Her mother was from Casablanca, and worked as a cook after emigrating; her father was from Sidi Ifni. Her mother attended secondary school, but married and left the country before taking her school-leaving exam. Bouras grew up in De Pijp, and the family bought a house in Nieuw Sloten when she was 15.

As a child, she attended the Bouchra School, an Arabic-language school in Amsterdam's Rivierenbuurt neighborhood, which was one of the country's first such schools. Bouras became interested in history at a young age, and by the start of secondary school wanted to study history. As a young student, she was involved in a number of extracurricular activities, including student council, the school newspaper, and drama club.

Bouras entered Vrije Universiteit Amsterdam in 2000, where she studied history. In 2003, she studied abroad at the College of New Jersey. She has credited this time in the United States with awakening her connection to her Moroccan heritage and her Muslim and Arab identity. In 2005, she completed her master's degree dissertation, which focused on "Moroccan women's role in migration in the Netherlands".

In 2012, she published her Ph.D.-thesis, Het Land van Herkomst, Perspectieven op verbondenheid met Marokko, 1960–2010 (The Country of Origin: Perspectives on Alliance with Morocco, 1960–2010).

== Career ==
Bouras began working at Leiden University in 2006, where she is a lecturer in history.

In celebration of the 40th anniversary of the treaty allowing mass-recruitment of Moroccans for Dutch industries, Bouras (together with Annemarie Cottaar and Fatiha Laouikili) wrote a book entitled Marokkanen in Nederland: de pioniers vertellen (Moroccans in the Netherlands: Pioneers Tell Their Stories, ed. Meulenhof 2009). The book deals with the history of arrival, settlement, and integration of Moroccans in Dutch society. Bouras interviewed many Moroccan immigrants for a 2019 article "Vijf mythes over de komst van Marokkaanse gastarbeiders naar Nederland ontkracht" ("Five myths about the arrival of Moroccan guest-workers in the Netherlands disproved") in Trouw. She also coauthored Rif Tour: Marokkanen in Nederland 1960–1973 (with Cottaar, Laouikili and Annemarie Boer).

== Personal life ==
Bouras is married and has two daughters.

Bouras has criticized the attitude of the Dutch government towards the Moroccan-Dutch community, and has suggested the government has used the issue of antisemitism as a cover for discriminating against the community. In an interview with OneWorld Magazine, she said, "The fear within the Jewish community is real, we should not trivialize it...But...politicians are abusing the fear of anti-Semitism to identify an enemy". She has been vocal in opposing the Gaza war, and Dutch support of the Israeli military.

== Publications ==
=== Books ===
- Bouras, Nadia; Cottaar, Annemarie; Laouikili, Fatiha (2009). Marokkanen in Nederland: de pioniers vertellen [Moroccans in the Netherlands: Pioneers Tell Their Stories]. Meulenhof.
- Bouras, Nadia (2012). Het land van herkomst: Perspectieven op verbondenheid met Marokko, 1960–2010 (Doctoral dissertation, Leiden). Historische migratiestudies. Vol. 3. Hilversum: Verloren. ISBN 978 90 8704 323 0.
- Bouras, Nadia (2020). Een Klas Apart: Biografie van een Arabische school in Amsterdam-Zuid. Amsterdam: Boom.
  - Nominated for the 2021 Brusse Prize for best Dutch-language journalistic book

=== Articles ===
- Bouras, Nadia (2013-07-01). "Shifting perspectives on transnationalism: analysing Dutch political discourse on Moroccan migrants' transnational ties, 1960–2010". Ethnic and Racial Studies. 36 (7). doi:10.1080/01419870.2013.785580. ISSN 0141-9870.
