= Bondowoso Regency =

Regency in East Java, Indonesia

Bondowoso Regency Kabupaten Bondowoso
- Regency

Other transcription(s)
  - Madurese: Bânḍâbâsa (Latèn) بۤانڊۤابۤاسا (Pèghu) ꦨꦤ꧀ꦝꦨꦱ (Carakan)
  - Javanese: Båndhåwåså (Gêdrig) بانڎاواسا (Pégon) ꦧꦤ꧀ꦝꦮꦱ (Hånåcåråkå)
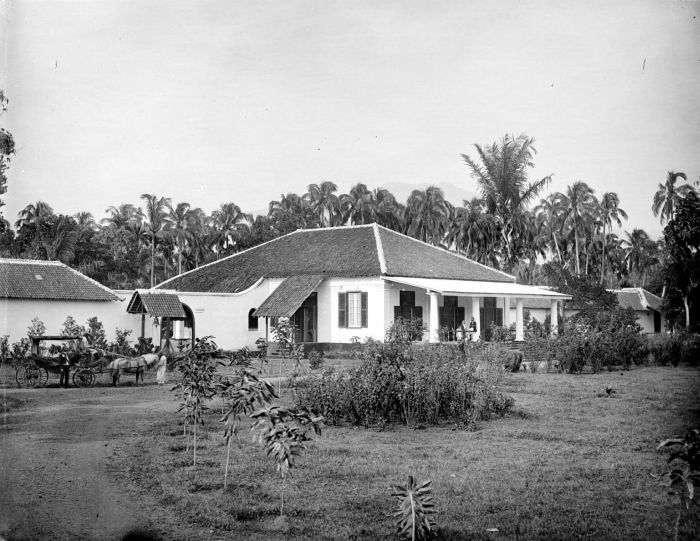
- Assistant Resident Bondowoso in 1930

- Coat of arms
- Motto: Swasthi Bhuwana Krta (Kindness will lead us to happiness in this world and the hereafter)
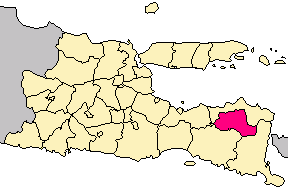
- Location within East Java

- Location in Java and Indonesia Bondowoso Regency (Indonesia)
- Coordinates: 7.9404°S 113.9834°E
- Country: Indonesia
- Province: East Java
- Capital: Bondowoso

Government
  - Regent: Abdul Hamid Wahid
  - Vice Regent: As'ad Yahya Syafi'i

Area
  - Total: 1,560.10 km^{2} (602.36 sq mi)

Population (mid 2025 estimate)
  - Total: 797,844
  - Density: 511.406/km^{2} (1,324.53/sq mi)
- Time zone: UTC+7 (IWST)
- Area code: (+62) 332
- Website: bondowosokab.go.id

Bondowoso Regency (Javanese: ꦏꦧꦸꦥꦠꦺꦤ꧀ꦧꦺꦴꦤ꧀ꦝꦺꦴꦮꦺꦴꦱꦺꦴ, romanized: Kabupatèn Bondowoso) is a landlocked regency in East Java, Indonesia. It covers an area of 1,560.10 km^{2}, and had a population of 736,772 at the 2010 Census and 776,151 at the 2020 Census; the official estimate as of mid 2025 was 797,844 (comprising 390,208 males and 407,636 females). The most common languages are Madurese and Javanese, although Madurese is the majority. The nearest large city is Surabaya, approximately five hour's drive away.

The administrative centre of the regency is the provincial town of Bondowoso, after which the regency is named. Common in most provincial towns is a park in the city centre, called "Alun-Alun"; Bondowoso is no exception. In the backdrop of the park is a view of a mountain ("gunung").

Tourist spots include Kawah Ijen, a crater lake. Kawah Ijen is managed jointly by two local governments, Bondowoso Regency and Banyuwangi Regency. A hike or climb to the crater takes around 1–2 hours. In addition to the crater, other tourist destinations in Bondowoso are Tancak Kembar in Pakem and Air Terjun Belawan Sempol. Other spots are Gunung Merapi and waterfalls.

Bondowoso town is known for its dessert, "tape" (pronounced "tah-peh"), to the extent that it is named "Tape city". Tape is made from cassava wrapped inside banana leaves to be fermented with fermentation starter which contains yeast (mainly Saccharomyces cerevisiae), mold (such as Aspergillus sp.), and bacteria (such as Acetobacter sp.)

There has been an Arabic community living in the area for some time, since before the Dutch occupation. They live in an area called "Kampung Arab" (Arabs Compound) on Imam Bonjol Street.

== Administrative districts ==
The Regency is divided into twenty-three districts (kecamatan), tabulated below with their areas and their population totals from the 2010 Census and the 2020 Census, together with the official estimates as of mid 2025. The former Sempol District, in the far southeast of the regency, which contains the crater lake of Kawah Ijen, has been renamed Ijen District; unlike the rest of the regency, which lies on the other side of the Ijen Mountain Range, Ijen District drains eastwards towards the Bali Strait. The table also includes the locations of the district headquarters the number of administrative villages in each district (totaling 209 rural desa and 10 urban kelurahan), and its postcodes.

Kode Wilayah	Name of District (kecamatan)	Area in km^{2}	Pop'n Census 2010	Pop'n Census 2020	Pop'n Estimate mid 2025	Admin centre	No. of villages	Post codes
35.11.01	Maesan	56.08	45,824	48,076	49,757	Maesan	12	68262
35.11.06	Grujugan	74.45	34,381	37,114	38,776	Taman	11	68261
35.11.02	Tamanan	28.15	35,621	38,414	39,923	Tamanan	9	68263
35.11.23	Jambesari Darus Sholah	30.11	33,723	36,848	36,745	Jambesari	9	68261 & 68263 ^{(a)}
35.11.05	Pujer	39.89	37,600	40,226	41,342	Kejayan	11	68271
35.11.03	Tlogosari	110.92	44,033	45,704	47,511	Pakisan	10	68272
35.11.04	Sukosari	23.17	14,987	15,527	15,752	Sukosari Lor	4	68287
35.11.18	Sumber Wringin	137.95	32,945	34,231	35,756	Sumber Wringin	6	68289
35.11.10	Tapen	57.04	33,072	34,040	34,151	Tapen	9	68283
35.11.09	Wonosari	42.28	38,498	39,762	41,221	Wonosari	12	68282
35.11.08	Tenggarang	25.80	39,874	42,639	44,470	Tenggarang	12 ^{(b)}	68281
35.11.11	Bondowoso (town)	23.16	70,963	76,422	77,127	Dabasah	11 ^{(c)}	68211: 68219
35.11.07	Curahdami	50.29	31,376	33,140	35,449	Curahdami	12 ^{(b)}	68250
35.11.20	Binakal	39.04	15,173	17,030	17,290	Binakal	8	68251
35.11.17	Pakem	62.08	21,352	23,108	23,809	Patemon	8	68253
35.11.12	Wringin	58.01	39,423	40,076	41,331	Wringin	13	68252
35.11.13	Tegalampel	37.03	24,483	26,161	26,981	Sekarputih	8 ^{(b)}	68292
35.11.21	Taman Krocok	53.00	16,237	16,711	16,907	Taman Krocok	7	68291
35.11.14	Klabang	91.20	18,413	18,378	18,818	Klabang	11	68284
35.11.19	Ijen	207.20	11,252	11,896	12,161	Ijen	6	68288
35.11.22	Botolinggo	127.41	28,801	29,937	29,521	Lumutan	8	68284: 68285
35.11.16	Prajekan	56.65	25,116	25,581	25,963	Prajekan Lor	7	68285
35.11.15	Cermee	129.20	43,625	45,892	47,083	Cernee	15	68286 ^{(d)}
	Totals	1,560.10	736,772	776,151	797,844	Bondowoso	219	

Notes: (a) except for the desa of Pengarang, which has a postcode of 68271. (b) including one kelurahan (the district administrative centre). (c) comprises 7 kelurahan (Badean, Blindungan, Dabasah, Kademangan, Kota Kulon, Nangkaan and Tamansari) and 4 desa. (d) except for the desa of Grujugan, which has a postcode of 68261.

== Megalithic artifacts ==
There are more than 1000 megalithic artifacts found in the villages around Bondowoso, such as menhirs (standing stones), sarcophagi, statues, dolmens (lying stones or tomb tables), and caves. A common megalith type found in Indonesia is the batu kenong with a shape resembling a local musical instrument. The Bondowoso Regency contains up to 400 batu kenong, the highest concentration in Indonesia. An easily accessible location with a wide variety of megaliths is the Pekauman Site at kilometer 8 on the Jember-Bondowoso road.

== Climate ==
Bondowoso has a tropical monsoon climate (Am) with moderate to little rainfall from May to October and heavy to very heavy rainfall from November to April.

Climate data for Bondowoso
Month	Jan	Feb	Mar	Apr	May	Jun	Jul	Aug	Sep	Oct	Nov	Dec	Year
Mean daily maximum °C (°F)	30.1 (86.2)	30.1 (86.2)	30.2 (86.4)	30.6 (87.1)	30.3 (86.5)	30.3 (86.5)	30.2 (86.4)	30.5 (86.9)	31.7 (89.1)	32.3 (90.1)	31.7 (89.1)	30.5 (86.9)	30.7 (87.3)
Daily mean °C (°F)	24.9 (76.8)	24.9 (76.8)	24.9 (76.8)	25.1 (77.2)	24.6 (76.3)	24.2 (75.6)	23.6 (74.5)	23.9 (75.0)	24.7 (76.5)	25.3 (77.5)	25.4 (77.7)	24.9 (76.8)	24.7 (76.5)
Mean daily minimum °C (°F)	19.7 (67.5)	19.7 (67.5)	19.6 (67.3)	19.6 (67.3)	19.0 (66.2)	18.1 (64.6)	17.0 (62.6)	17.3 (63.1)	17.7 (63.9)	18.4 (65.1)	19.2 (66.6)	19.4 (66.9)	18.7 (65.7)
Average rainfall mm (inches)	377 (14.8)	333 (13.1)	306 (12.0)	168 (6.6)	107 (4.2)	42 (1.7)	39 (1.5)	27 (1.1)	35 (1.4)	87 (3.4)	169 (6.7)	295 (11.6)	1,985 (78.1)
Source: Climate-Data.org
