= Liesbeth Zegveld =

Dutch lawyer, legal expert and professor (born 1970)

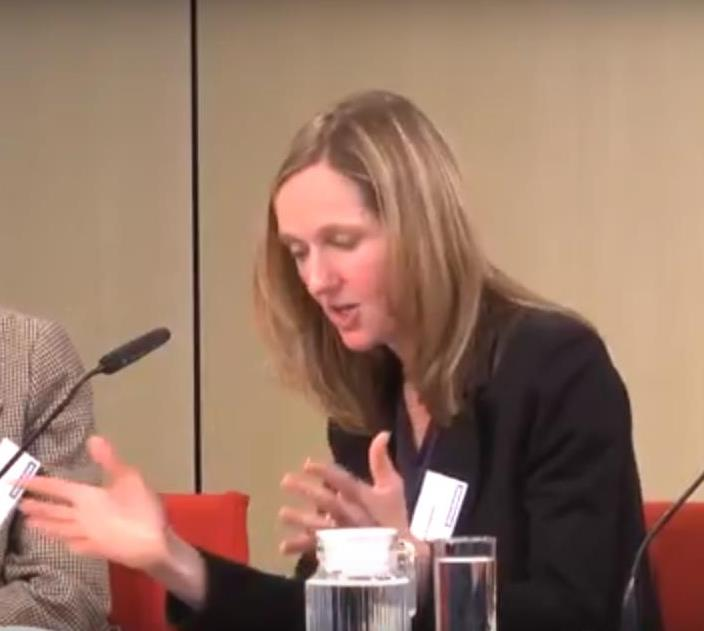
Liesbeth Zegveld (2018)

Liesbeth Zegveld (born 14 January 1970) is a Dutch lawyer, legal expert and professor.

== Education and career ==
Zegveld was born in Ridderkerk and grew up in Dirksland on the island of Goeree-Overflakkee in South Holland, the Netherlands. After her law studies at Utrecht University she obtained a doctoral degree cum laude in 2000. She received several awards for her doctoral thesis Accountability of Armed Opposition Groups in International Law.

In 2000, she was sworn in as a lawyer; and in 2005, she became a partner at Prakken d'Oliveira Human Rights Lawyers. At this law firm, Zegveld heads the international law and human rights department, where her cases mainly focus on liability for violations of human rights and compensation for victims of war.

Between 2006 and 2013, Zegveld was a professor at Leiden University, where she lectured on international humanitarian law, in particular on the rights of women and children during armed conflict. She has been professor of war reparations at the University of Amsterdam since the end of 2013.

Liesbeth Zegveld is a member of the Dutch Human Rights Watch committee and former member of the Committee on Reparation for Victims of Armed Conflict within the International Law Association and a member of the Netherlands Society for International Law.

=== Notable cases ===
Zegveld is well known for her work on the Srebrenica case of the Bosnian genocide, where she represented the relatives of two victims of the Srebrenica massacre in July 1995. Before the Dutch courts, Zegveld asserted that Dutchbat – the Dutch battalion of the United Nations Protection Force that was responsible for the protection of the Srebrenica enclave – and the Dutch government knowingly exposed Bosnian Muslims to the enemy Bosnian Serb Army. In 2013, the Dutch Supreme Court accepted the claim.

In 2011, Zegveld represented seven widows and two others in a case filed by the Dutch Honorary Debts Committee Foundation against the Dutch state for its involvement in the Rawagede massacre of 9 December 1947, during which 431 Indonesian villagers were killed by the Royal Netherlands East Indies Army. Following a judgment by the Court of The Hague, the state decided to settle the matter, publicly apologising for its involvement and paying €20,000 in compensation to each still living stakeholder.

In 2011 and 2013, Zegveld represented family members of victims of the 1976–81 military regime of Jorge Rafael Videla in Argentina, who reported Jorge Zorreguieta – the father of Queen Máxima of the Netherlands – to the Public Prosecution Service for his role in the regime.

Zegveld also represented the victims of Iraqi chemical attacks against Iran during the Iran–Iraq War of 1980–88 in a case against Frans van Anraat, a Dutch businessman who sold materials to produce chemical weapons to the Iraqi regime during the war. All victims were granted €25,000 in damages.

Another high-profile case was that of Azhar Sabah Jaloud, who was fatally shot at a Dutch military checkpoint on 24 April 2007 during the Iraq War. On behalf of the young man's father, Zegveld started a case against the Dutch state, which resulted in a successful complaint against the Netherlands before the European Court of Human Rights.

On behalf of the Federation of Dutch Trade Unions and a Bangladeshi migrant worker, Zegveld held the FIFA accountable for the mistreatment of migrant workers who prepare the 2022 World Cup in Qatar.

Zegveld represented the families of two South Moluccan perpetrators of the 1977 Dutch train hijacking in a case against the Dutch government. In July 2018, the Court of The Hague dismissed the case, concluding that the Dutch state had not taken unlawful action in ending the hostage crisis.

In 2018, Zegveld and her client Salo Muller persuaded the Dutch state-owned rail operator Nederlandse Spoorwegen to pay compensation to Holocaust survivors and relatives of those transported by Dutch rail to Nazi concentration camps during World War II.

== Bibliography ==
- (2018) Liesbeth Zegveld, ‘What Duties Do Peacekeepers Owe Civilians? Lessons from the Nuhanović Case’, in: M. Latimer & Ph. Sands (eds.), The Grey Zone: Civilian Protection between Human Rights and the Laws of War, pp. 295–315.
- (2015) Liesbeth Zegveld, ‘Body Counts and Masking War Time Violence’, in: 6 Journal of International Humanitarian Legal Studies, pp. 443–461.
- (2012) Liesbeth Zegveld, ‘Compensating Victims of Genocide’, in: H.G. van der Wilt, J. Vervliet, G.K. Sluiter & J.Th.M. Houwink ten Cate (eds.), The Genocide Convention: The legacy of 60 years (Martinus Nijhoff Publishers), pp. 97–105.
- (2012) Liesbeth Zegveld, ‘Victims of international crimes in criminal proceedings’, in: 87 Nederlands Juristenblad 28 pp. 1936–1941.
- (2012) Liesbeth Zegveld & Jeff Handmaker, 'Universal Jurisdiction: state of affairs and ways ahead’, ISS working paper no. 532.
- (2012) Liesbeth Zegveld, ‘The importance of Fact-Finding Missions under International Humanitarian Law’, in: Ch. Meloni & T. Gianni (eds.), Is there a court for Gaza. A Test Bench for International Justice (T.M.C. Asser Press).
- (2010) Liesbeth Zegveld, ‘Victims’ Claims and International Criminal Courts: Incompatible Values?’ in: 8 Journal of International Criminal Justice 1.
- (2009) Liesbeth Zegveld, ‘Compensation for the Victims of Chemical War in Iraq and Iran’, in: Carla Ferstman, Mariana Goetz and Alan Stephens (eds.), Reparations for Victims of Genocide, War Crimes and Crimes Against Humanity: Systems in Place and Systems in the Making, pp. 369–382.
- (2009) Liesbeth Zegveld, ‘Mass Claims before the International Criminal Court’, in: W.J.M. van Genugten, M.P. Scharf & S.E. Radin (eds.), Criminal Jurisdiction 100 Years After the 1907 Hague Peace Conference: 2007 Hague Joint Conference on Contemporary Issues of International Law, pp. 294–299.
- (2009) Liesbeth Zegveld, ‘Remedies for War Victims’, in: Larissa van den Herik & Carsten Stahn (eds.), Future Perspectives on International Criminal Justice (T.M.C. Asser Press/Cambridge University Press), pp. 611–624.
- (2008) Liesbeth Zegveld, 'Remedies for victims of violations of international humanitarian law', in: 37 Vrede en Veiligheid 1, pp. 10–31.
- (2006) Liesbeth Zegveld, ‘Dutch cases on torture committed in Afghanistan – The relevance of the distinction between internal and international armed conflict’, in: 4 Journal of International Criminal Justice 4, pp. 878–880.
- (2006) Liesbeth Zegveld, 'How the concept of illegal combatant can contribute to international humanitarian law', in: Arianne Acke (ed.), Internationaal Humanitair Recht in de Kijker (Rode Kruis Vlaanderen), pp. 25–37.
- (2003) Liesbeth Zegveld, 'Remedies for Victims of Violations of International Humanitarian Law', 85 International Review of the Red Cross 851, pp. 499–528.
- (2002) Liesbeth Zegveld, 'Article 1(F) of the 1951 Refugee Convention and International Law; a Critical Appraisal of the ACV Advice', Nieuwsbrief Asiel en Vreemdelingenrecht (01/02).
- (2001) Frits Kalshoven & Liesbeth Zegveld, Constraints on the Waging of War - An Introduction to International Humanitarian Law, 3rd edition (International Committee of the Red Cross).
- (2001) Liesbeth Zegveld, 'The Bouterse Case', Netherlands Yearbook on International Law, Vol. XXXII, pp. 97–118.
- (2000) Jann K. Kleffner & Liesbeth Zegveld, 'Establishing an Individual Complaints Procedure for Violations of International Humanitarian Law', in: Horst Fischer (ed.), Yearbook of International Humanitarian Law, Vol. 3.
- (2000) Accountability of Armed Opposition Groups in International Law. Cambridge University Press, Cambridge 2002 (proefschrift)
