= Simon Spoor =

Dutch army general (1902–1949)

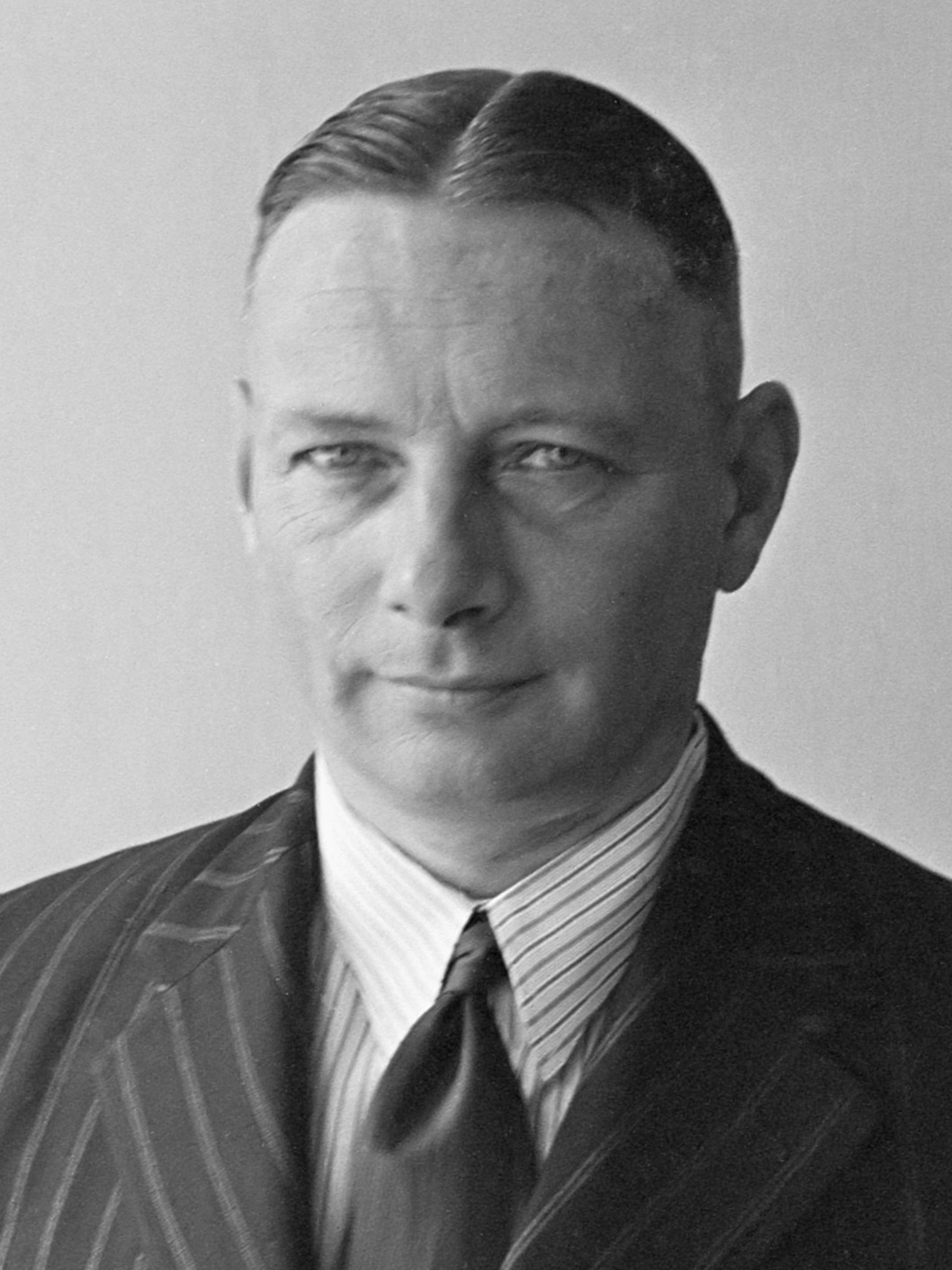
- Simon Spoor in 1948
- Born: Simon Hendrik Spoor; 12 January 1902; Amsterdam, Netherlands
- Died: 25 May 1949 (aged 47); Jakarta, Indonesia
- Spouses: L. A. M. Ooms (1923–1938); Rika Kroeze (1938–1947); Hermanna Trijntje Spoor-Dijkema (Q82575261)
- Military career
- Allegiance: Netherlands
- Branch: Royal Netherlands East Indies Army
- Service years: 1923–1949
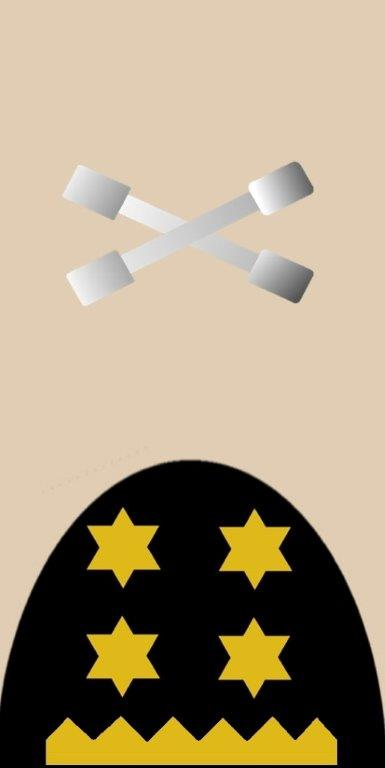
- Rank: General
- Commands: Chief of Staff of the Royal Netherlands East Indies Army
- Conflicts: World War II; Indonesian National Revolution
- Awards: Military William Order; Medal of Freedom

General Simon Hendrik Spoor (Dutch pronunciation: [ˈsimɔn ˈɦɛndrɪk spoːr]; 12 January 1902 – 25 May 1949) was the Chief of Staff of the Royal Netherlands East Indies Army and the Royal Dutch Army in the Dutch East Indies, from 1946 to 1949, during the Indonesian National Revolution.

== Career ==
Spoor was educated at a secondary school in The Hague, the cadet school in Alkmaar and the Royal Military Academy in Breda. In 1923 he was appointed as second lieutenant of infantry and was seconded to the Royal Netherlands East Indies Army from 1924 in Dutch Borneo. From 1929 to 1932 he studied at the Higher War College in The Hague. After having served in the General Staff in Bandung for two years, in 1934 he took a position as teacher of strategy and tactics at the Royal Military Academy in Breda. In 1938, Spoor returned to the Dutch East Indies, as Head of the Political Affairs Department of the General Staff and the Higher War College in Bandung. He taught Laws of war and East Indies Martial law. He was also an employee of the military 'Javabode'.

== World War II ==
In March 1942 Spoor belonged to the select group of senior officials and military staff who after the capitulation of the Royal Netherlands East Indies Army high command in Java to the Japanese Imperial Army emigrated to Australia. He was charged with building the Netherlands Forces Intelligence Service (NEFIS). He became a staff member to the American General Douglas MacArthur during the New Guinea campaign and was also present at the invasion with General MacArthur.

== Indonesian National Revolution ==
By Royal Decree of 19 January 1946, the then 44-year-old Colonel Spoor was appointed army commander in the Dutch East Indies with the temporary rank of lieutenant general. On 31 January, he took over the command of Lieutenant General L H van Oyen. In March 1946 Major General D C Buurman van Vreeden, as well as Spoor former staff officer of the KNIL, were assigned to him as Chief of Staff, Major Julius Tahija became his personal Adjudant.

Operationally the army commander functioned in the Dutch East Indies, until autumn 1946, under the Allied South-East Asia Command (SEAC) (under Mountbatten), such that only small numbers of Dutch troops were allowed in Java. From September 1946 the integration of the Dutch troops coming from the Netherlands into the KNIL troops required a large and cumbersome organization.

He led the two large Dutch military offensives (Dutch: Politionele acties) into Java against Indonesian Republican positions; Operation Product and Operation Kraai.

== Death ==
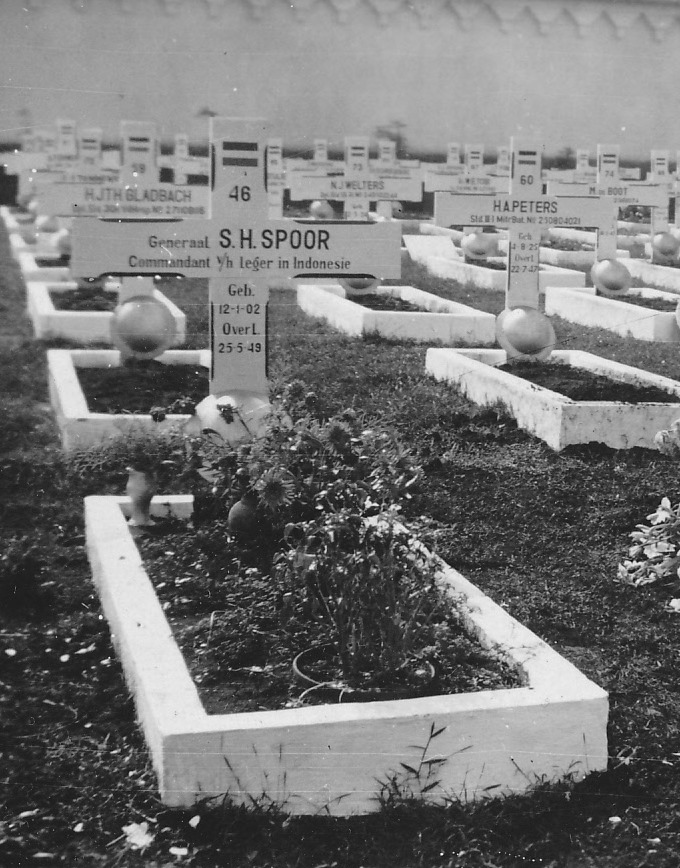
Spoor's grave in c. 1949

General Spoor died unexpectedly on 25 May 1949. He was buried on 28 May 1949 in the Dutch War Cemetery Menteng Pulo in Jakarta, among 'his men'. Some critics say he was poisoned, the Dutch historian Jaap de Moor explains in his biography about General Spoor that he was just an 'overworked man'.

== Ranks ==
- 31 July 1923: 2nd Lieutenant
- 31 July 1926: 1st Lieutenant
- 23 November 1934: Captain
- 27 May 1943: Major
- 10 January 1944: Lieutenant-Colonel
- 17 February 1945: Colonel
- 19 January 1946: Major General (temporary Gen.-Maj., also Army Commander)
- 2 September 1946: Lieutenant General
- 23 May 1949: General

== Awards and decorations ==
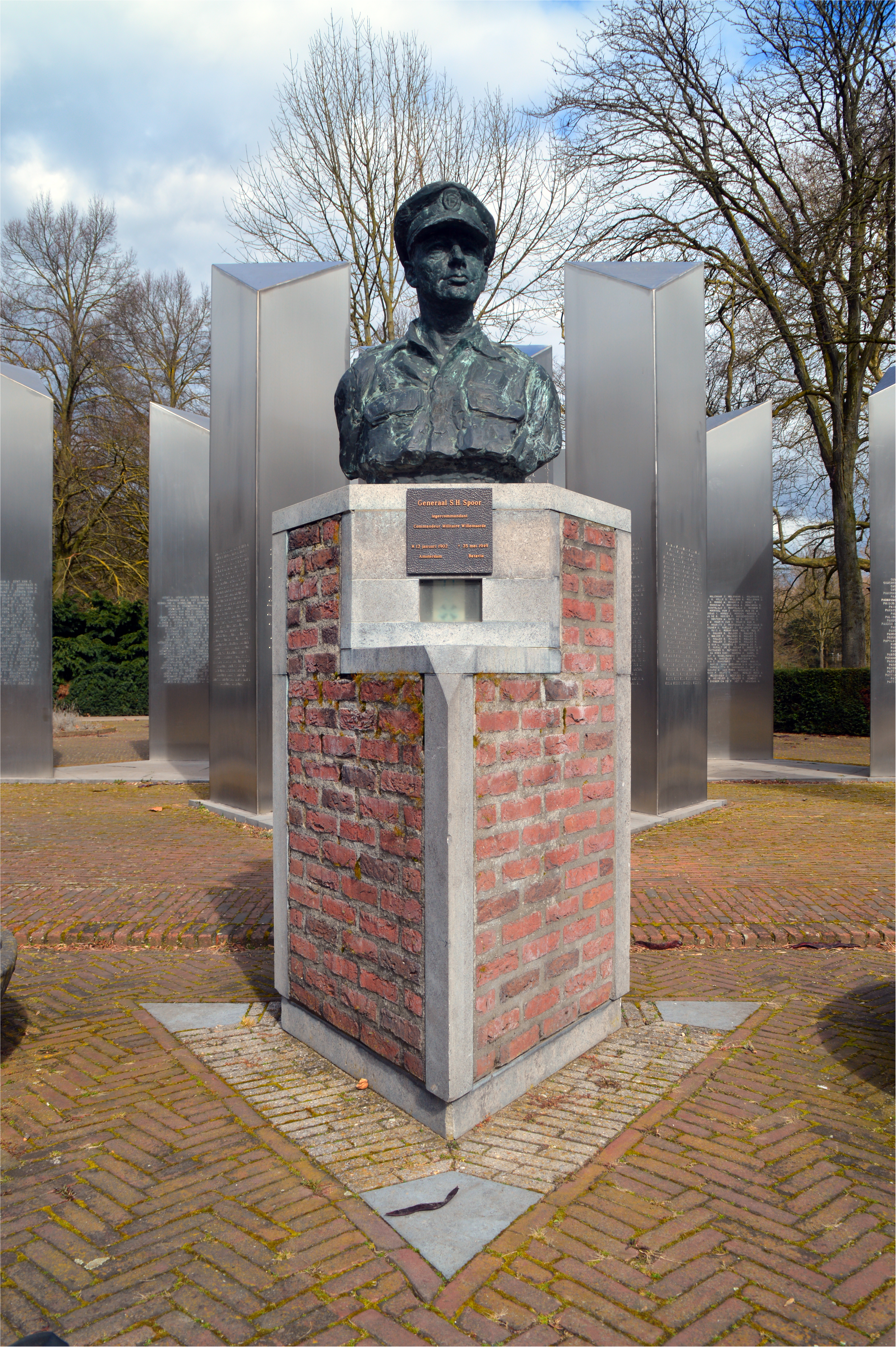
Bust General Simon Hendrik Spoor Nationaal Indië-monument 1945–1962 Roermond

- Commander of the Military William Order (posthumously, June 1949)
- Knight of the Order of the Dutch Lion
- Commander of the Order of Orange-Nassau with Swords
- Bronze Lion
- Medal of Freedom in bronze (United States)
- Officer's Cross
- Mobilization Cross 1914–1918
- War Commemorative Cross with Dutch East Indies 1941–1942 clasp
- Decoration for Order and Peace with clasps for 1945, 1946, 1947, 1948, and 1949

In April 2009, his widow, Mans Spoor-Dijkema, gave Spoor's medals to Bronbeek museum where his uniform was already exhibited.
