= Police Actions (Indonesia) =

1947 and 1949 Dutch military offensives on Java and Sumatra

- Part of the Indonesian National Revolution
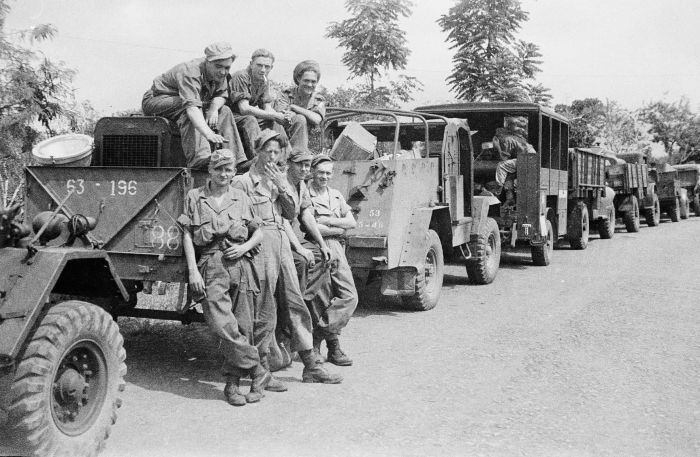
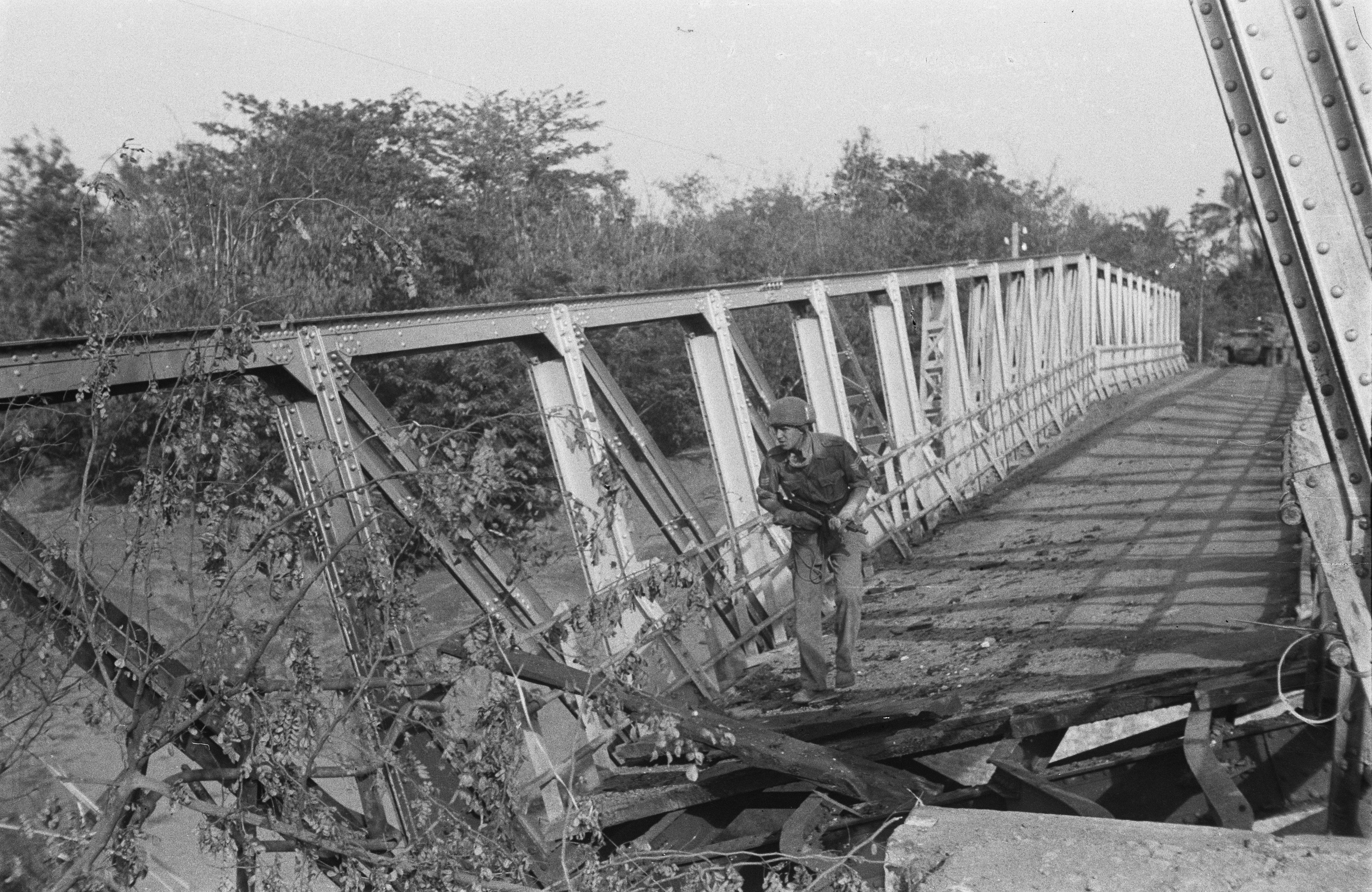
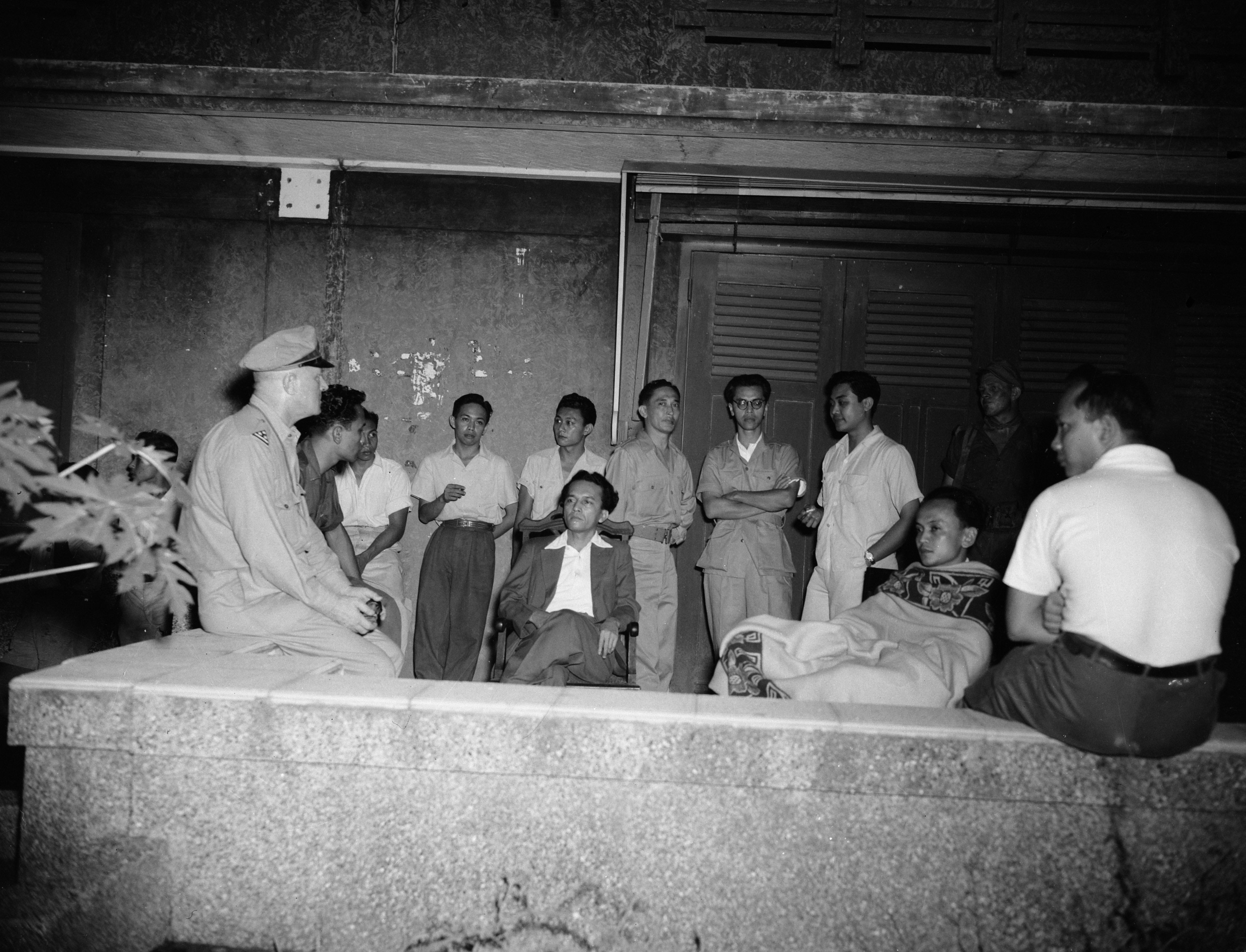
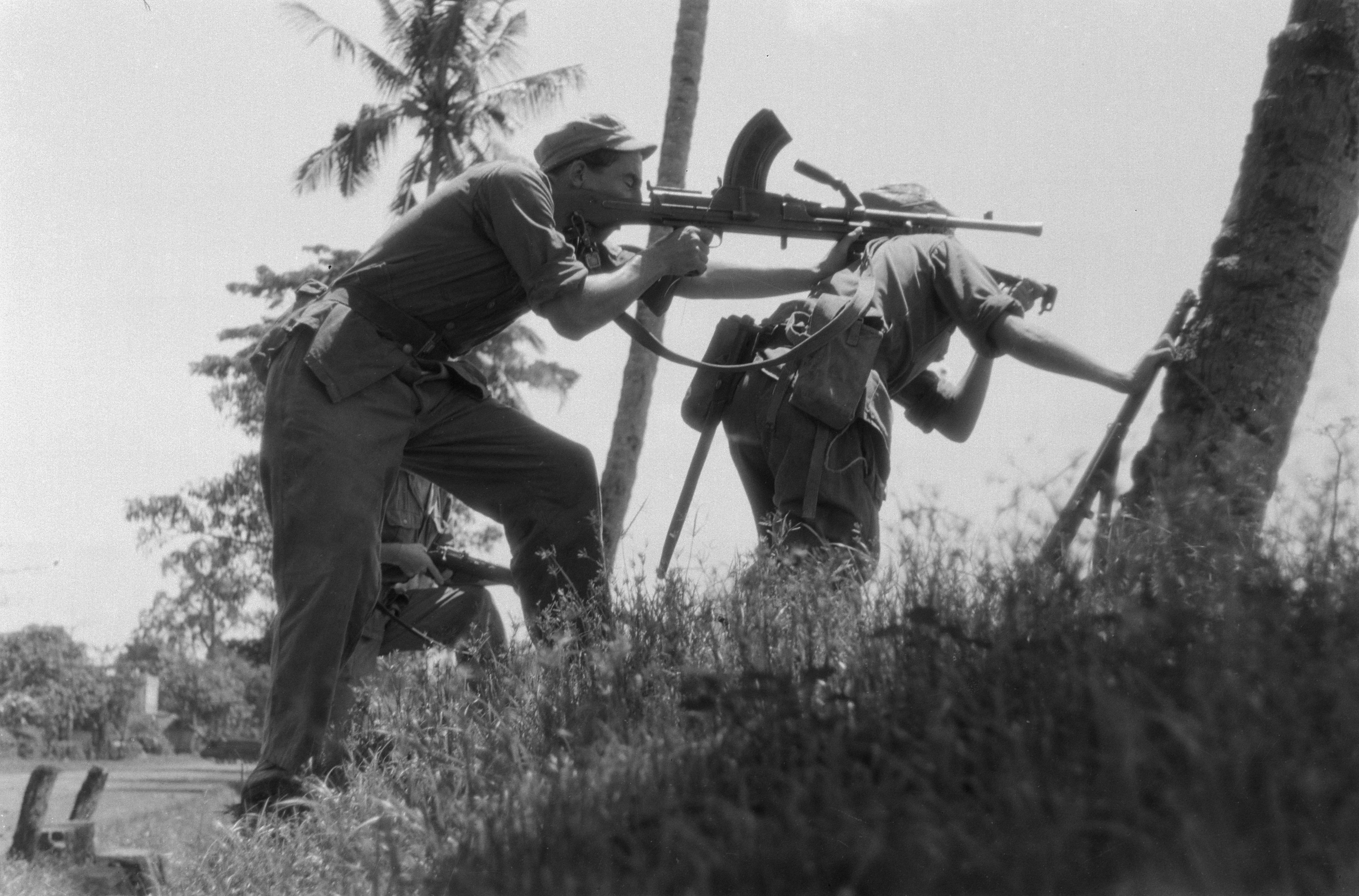
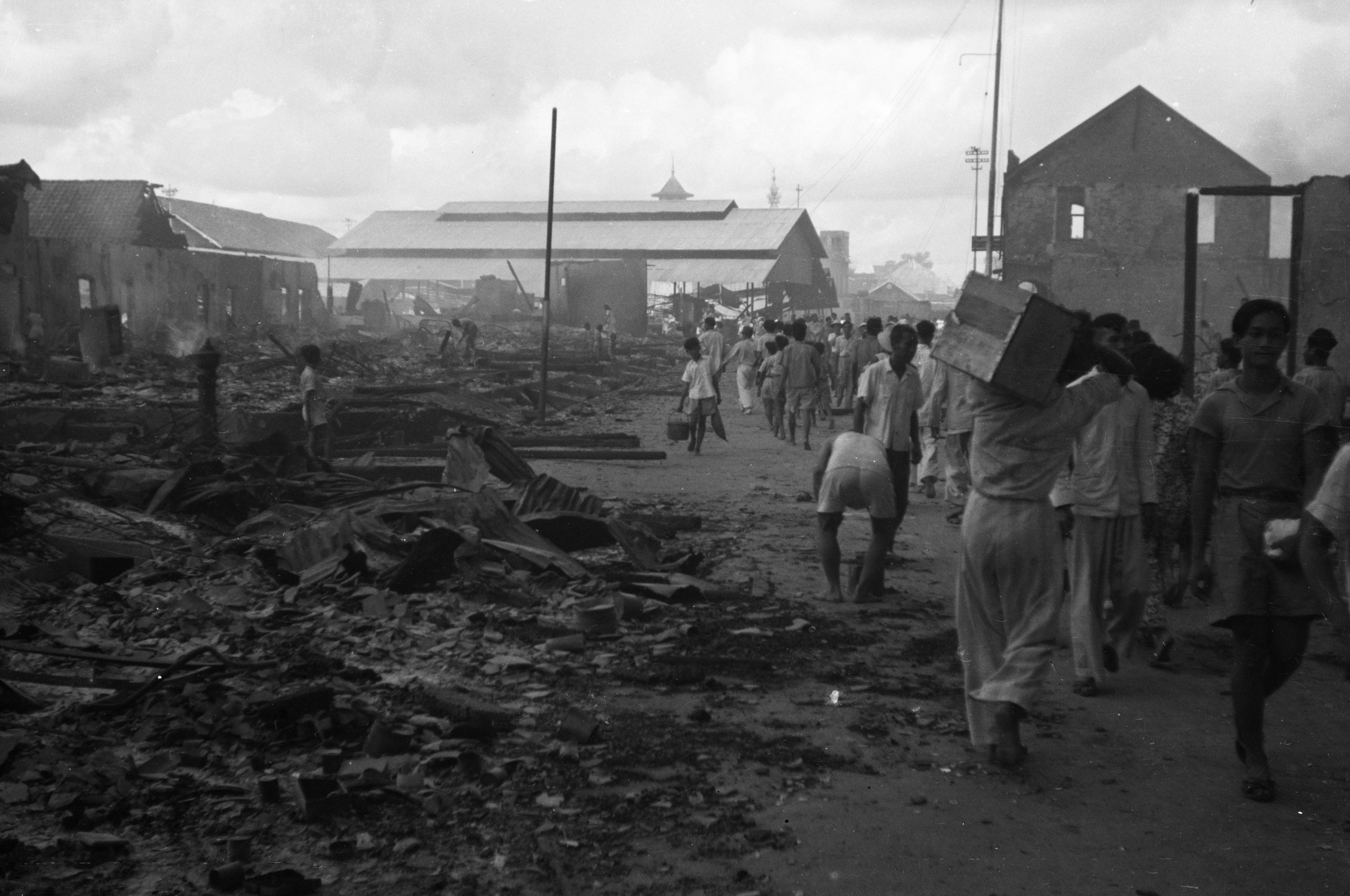
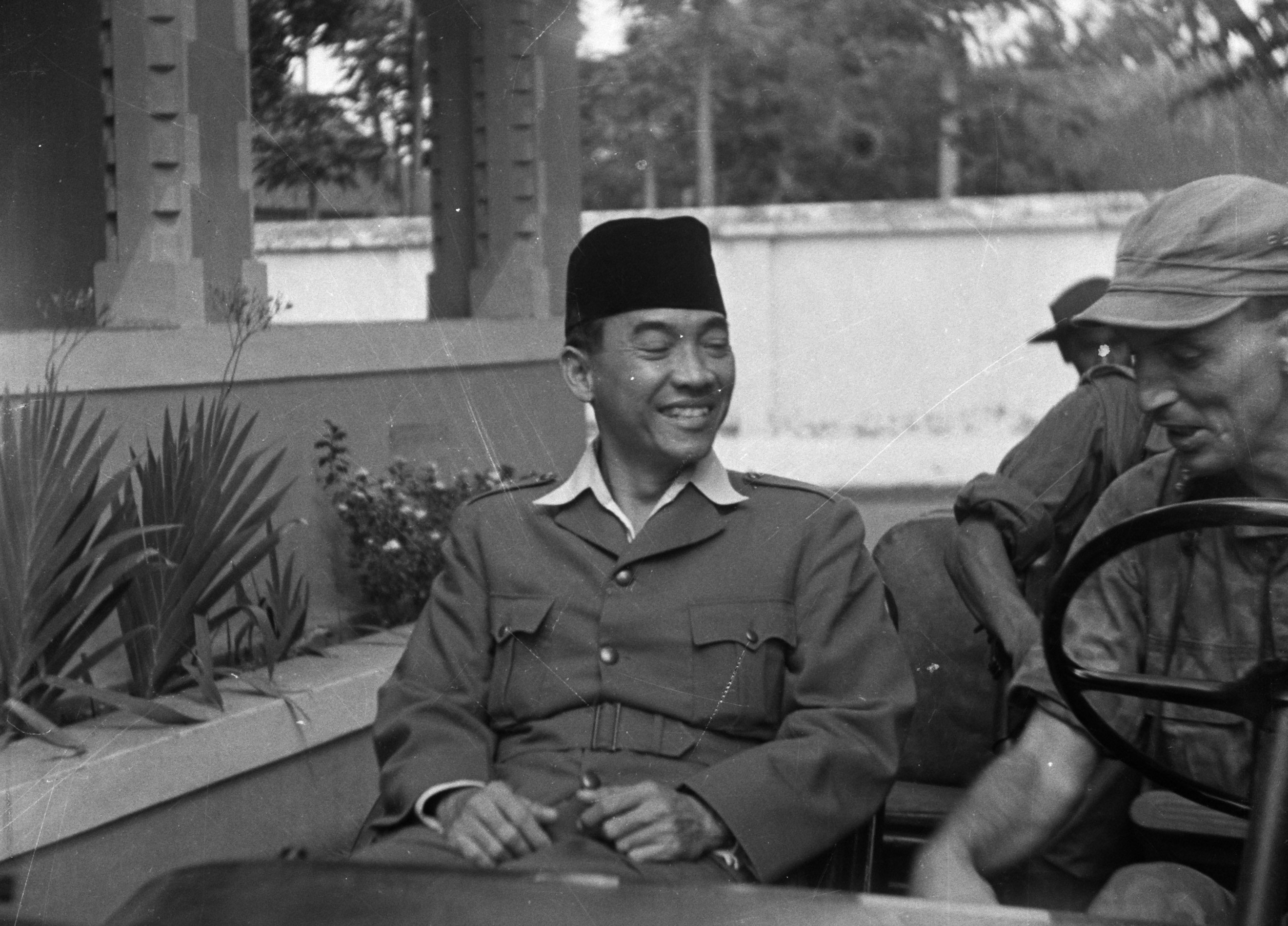
- From top, left to right: A Dutch military column during the First Police Action, 1947; A Dutch soldier examines a destroyed bridge in Java, 1947; Arrested Indonesian leaders, including A.K. Gani and Tamzil, sit on a veranda, 1947; Three Dutch soldiers during the Second Police Action, 1948; The burned out city center of Jambi, 1948; Sukarno sits in a jeep after his arrest, 1948
Date	21 July 1947 – 5 January 1949 (1 year, 5 months, 2 weeks and 1 day); Guerilla warfare until 7 May 1949
Location	Java and Sumatra
Result	Dutch victory; Indonesian government exiled
Territorial changes	Dutch forces recapture the economic centre of Sumatra and the Port of Java (1947), and Yogyakarta (1948–1949)

Belligerents
Indonesia	Netherlands

Commanders and leaders
Sudirman; Oerip Soemohardjo; Djatikoesoemo; Abdul Haris Nasution	Simon Spoor; Hubertus van Mook; Dirk van Langen

Strength
c. 200,000 (1947) c. 100,000 (1948–1949)	c. 120,000 (1947) c. 130,000 (1948–1949)

Casualties and losses
c. 4,000 casualties	c. 374 killed 178 wounded (1947); 16 missing (1947)

The Police Actions (Dutch: Politionele Acties, also Politiële Acties), were two major military offensives that the Netherlands carried out on Java and Sumatra against the Republic of Indonesia during its struggle for independence in the Indonesian National Revolution. In Indonesia they are collectively known as the Dutch Military Aggressions (Indonesian: Agresi Militer Belanda), although the direct translation Aksi Polisionil is also used.

In Dutch historiography and discourse, the entire Indonesian War of Independence was euphemistically referred to for decades as "the police actions", as coined by the government at the time. In the Netherlands, the public impression prevailed that only these two short-term operations had been carried out, intended to protect the Dutch East Indies from a rebellion that required police action. This perspective ignores the fact that between the Indonesian declaration of independence in August 1945 and the cession of sovereignty in December 1949, a 52-month war had taken place.

== Operation Product ==
Operation Product took place between 21 July and 5 August 1947. The Dutch greatly reduced and fragmented Indonesian-controlled territories, with a particular focus on the economic centre of Sumatra and the Port of Java. Lieutenant Governor-General Hubertus van Mook also advocated for the occupation of Yogyakarta, but the Dutch government decided against capturing the wartime seat of the Republican government at that time.

The Mariniersbrigade (Marbrig) headquartered in Surabaya was tasked with securing territory in East Java containing 40 sugar factories, 70 coffee plantations, 72 rubber plantations, 5 tea plantations, and 3 cinchona plantations. It carried out amphibious landings at Pasir Putih in Situbondo (Product North) and north of Banyuwangi (Product East) to occupy the eastern salient of Java. An offensive from Porong (Product South) connected Surabaya to the eastern salient through Pasuruan, before the marines then pushed on to the Republican stronghold of Malang.

== Operation Kraai ==
Operation Kraai (Crow) took place between 19 December 1948 and 5 January 1949. With the advantage of surprise, the Dutch captured Yogyakarta and arrested much of the Republican leadership, leading to the creation of an Indonesian government-in-exile in West Sumatra.

The Marbrig's actions in northeastern Java until 11 January are referred to as Operation Zeemeeuw (Seagull). The unit landed at Glondong in Tuban with the ultimate goal of occupying Madiun, but its advance was soon halted by a sizable anti-tank ditch some 30 km (19 mi) inland, dating back to the Japanese invasion of Java in 1942. From then on, the motorized columns were further delayed by the conditions of the wet season, destroyed bridges, and reliance on roads that no longer existed and were overgrown with teak forests. Because the marines lacked a dedicated engineer regiment, they had to cover much of the distance on foot and reached Madiun only after the city had already been captured by the regular army.

== Other operations ==
Eclipsed by the scale and notoriety of Product and Kraai, other Dutch offensive operations of the Indonesian Revolution included:

- Operation Trackman (Gresik, 10 August 1946)
- Operation Quantico (Gresik, 19 August 1946)
- Battle of Margarana (Marga, 20 November 1946)
- South Sulawesi campaign (10 December 1946–21 February 1947)
- Operation Ideaal (Mojokerto, 17 March 1947)
- Malang Operation (30 June 1947)
- Operation Carthago (Asembagus, 5 September 1947)
- Operation Albatros (Pacitan, 12 January 1949)
- Operation Otter (Prigi Bay, 7–18 April 1949)
- Paciran Operation (20–28 May 1949)
