= Susanto Cabinet =

Cabinet of Indonesia (1949–1950)

Susanto Cabinet Kabinet Susanto
- Cabinet of Indonesia
- 20 December 1949 – 21 January 1950
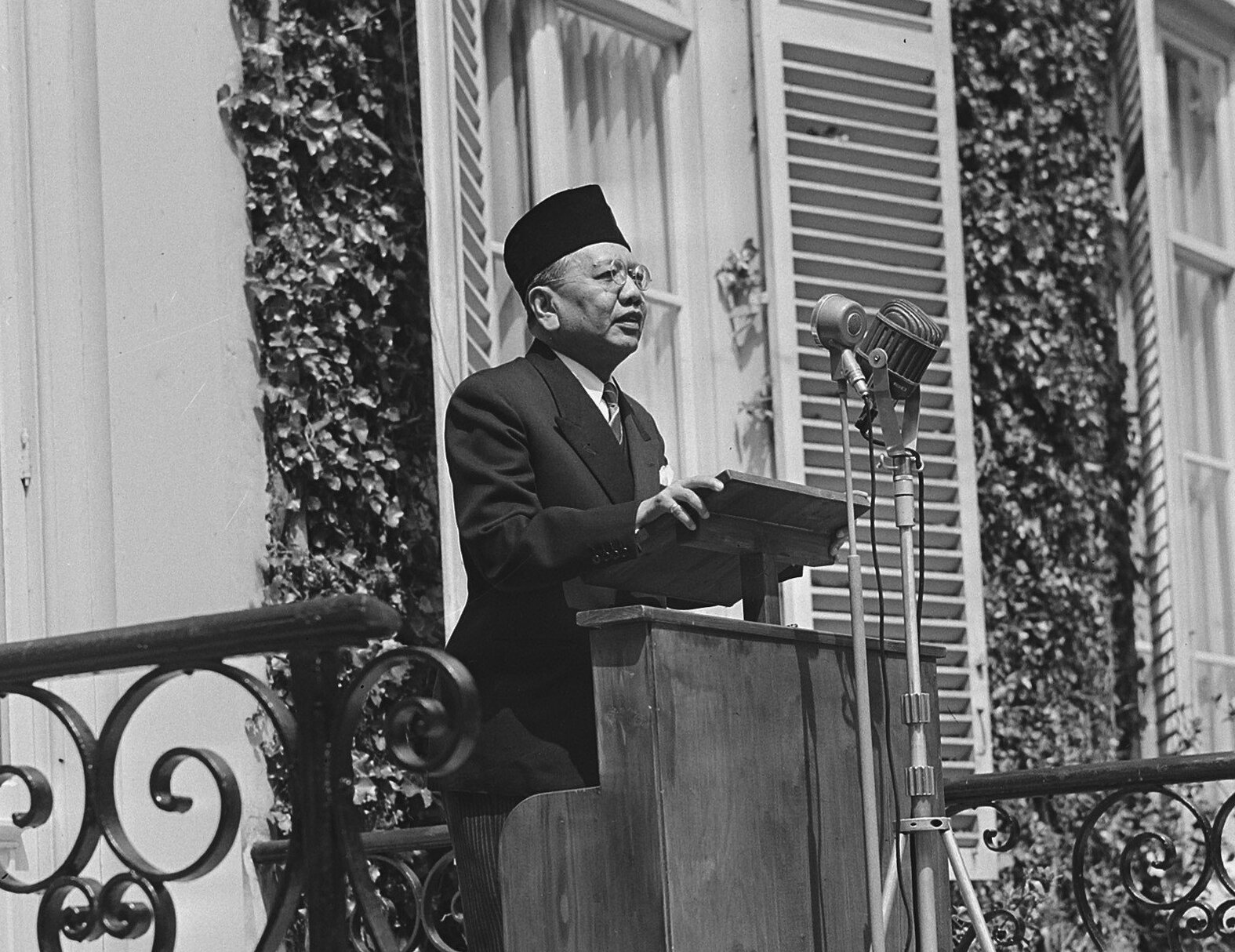
- Prime Minister Susanto Tirtoprodjo
- Date formed: 20 December 1949
- Date dissolved: 21 January 1950

People and organisations
- President: Assaat
- Prime Minister: Susanto Tirtoprodjo
- Member parties: PNI; Masyumi; Catholic; PGRI

History
- Predecessor: Hatta II
- Successor: Halim

The Susanto Cabinet (Indonesian: Kabinet Susanto) was the first cabinet of the State of the Republic of Indonesia, one of the 16 states in the United States of Indonesia. It served from 20 December 1949 until 21 January 1950, when a permanent cabinet under the leadership of Prime Minister Abdul Halim was appointed.

== Composition ==
=== Cabinet Leadership ===
- Acting Prime Minister: Susanto Tirtoprodjo (Indonesian National Party – PNI)

=== Departmental Ministers ===
- Minister of Home Affairs: Susanto Tirtoprodjo (Indonesian National Party – PNI)
- Minister of Justice: Soesanto Tirtoprodjo (Indonesian National Party – PNI)
- Minister of Information: Samsoeddin (Masyumi Party)
- Minister of Finance: Lukman Hakim (Indonesian National Party – PNI)
- Minister of Supply of People's Provisions: I.J. Kasimo (PKRI)
- Minister of Welfare: I.J. Kasimo (PKRI)
- Minister of Labor and Social Affairs: Koesnan (PGRI)
- Minister of Education & Culture: S. Mangunsarkoro (Indonesian National Party – PNI)
- Minister of Religious Affairs: Masjkur (Masyumi Party)
