= Deputy Prime Minister of Indonesia =

Former office holder position in Indonesia

- Wakil Perdana Menteri Indonesia
- National Emblem of Indonesia

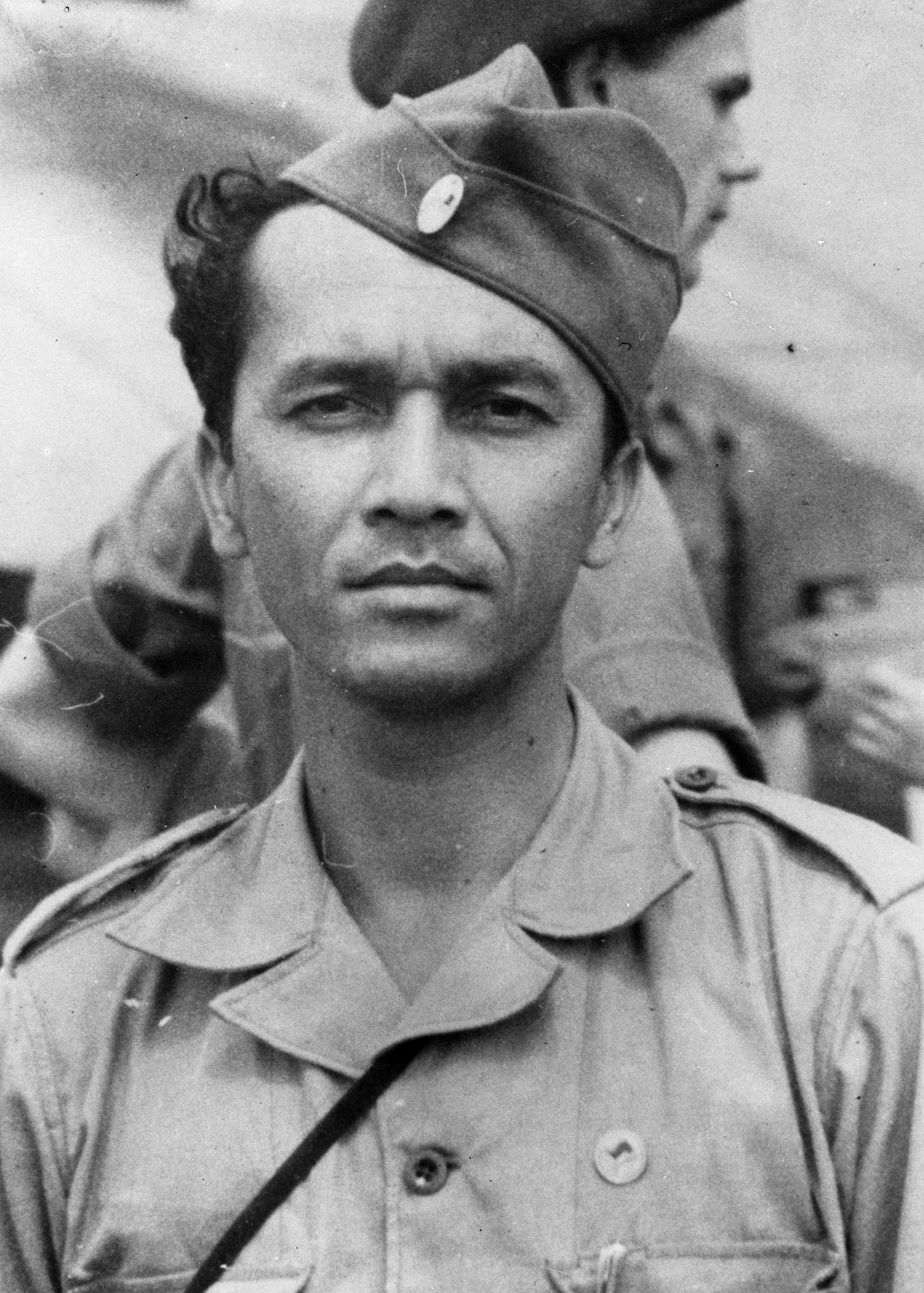
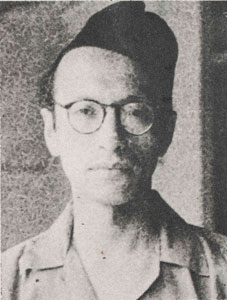
- Adnan Kapau Gani & Setyadjit Soegondo as First Deputy Prime Ministers
- Appointer: President
- Precursor: None
- Formation: 3 July 1947
- First holder: Adnan Kapau Gani; Setyadjit Soegondo
- Final holder: Johannes Leimena; Adam Malik; Hamengkubuwana IX; Suharto; Idham Chalid
- Abolished: 25 July 1966
- Succession: None

The title of Deputy Prime Minister of Indonesia (Indonesian: Wakil Perdana Menteri Indonesia) was given to a member of the Cabinet of Ministers of between 1947 and 1966. The deputy prime minister served as acting prime minister in the absence of the Prime Minister of Indonesia. This position was abolished in 1966.

== List of deputy prime ministers of Indonesia ==
=== Indonesian national revolution era ===
	Portrait	Name	Took office	Left office	Cabinet	Prime Minister	Note
1		Adnan Kapau Gani	3 July 1947	11 November 1947	Amir Sjarifuddin I	Amir Sjarifuddin	
1		Setyadjit Soegondo	3 July 1947	11 November 1947	Amir Sjarifuddin I	Amir Sjarifuddin	
2		Adnan Kapau Gani	11 November 1947	23 January 1948	Amir Sjarifuddin II	Amir Sjarifuddin	
2		Setyadjit Soegondo	11 November 1947	23 January 1948	Amir Sjarifuddin II	Amir Sjarifuddin	
2		Samsoeddin	11 November 1947	23 January 1948	Amir Sjarifuddin II	Amir Sjarifuddin	
2		Wondoamiseno	11 November 1947	23 January 1948	Amir Sjarifuddin II	Amir Sjarifuddin	
None			29 January 1948	4 August 1949	Hatta I	Mohammad Hatta	
3		Sjafruddin Prawiranegara	4 August 1949	14 December 1949	Hatta II	Mohammad Hatta	

=== United States of Indonesia era ===
	Portrait	Name	Took office	Left office	Cabinet	Prime Minister	Note
None			20 December 1949	15 August 1950	RUSI	Mohammad Hatta	
None			20 December 1949	21 January 1950	Soesanto	Susanto Tirtoprodjo	
4		Abdul Hakim Harahap	21 January 1950	15 August 1950	Halim	Abdul Halim	

=== Parliamentary democracy era ===
	Portrait	Name	Party	Took office	Left office	Cabinet	Prime Minister	Note
5		Hamengkubuwono IX	None	6 September 1950	27 April 1951	Natsir	Mohammad Natsir	
6		Raden Soewirjo	PNI	27 April 1951	3 April 1952	Sukiman	Soekiman Wirjosandjojo	
7		Prawoto Mangkusasmito	Masyumi	3 April 1952	3 June 1953	Wilopo	Wilopo	
8		Wongsonegoro	PIR	1 August 1953	24 Juli 1955	Ali Sastroamidjojo I	Ali Sastroamidjojo	
8		Zainul Arifin	NU	1 August 1953	24 Juli 1955	Ali Sastroamidjojo I	Ali Sastroamidjojo	
9		Harsono Tjokroaminoto	PSII	12 August 1955	3 March 1956	Burhanuddin Harahap	Burhanuddin Harahap	
9		Djanoe Ismadi	PIR	12 August 1955	3 March 1956	Burhanuddin Harahap	Burhanuddin Harahap	
10		Mohammad Roem	Masyumi	24 March 1956	9 January 1957	Ali Sastroamidjojo II	Ali Sastroamidjojo	
10		Idham Chalid	NU	24 March 1956	9 April 1957	Ali Sastroamidjojo II	Ali Sastroamidjojo	
11		Idham Chalid	NU	9 April 1957	5 July 1959	Djuanda	Djuanda Kartawidjaja	
11		Hardi	PNI	9 April 1957	5 July 1959	Djuanda	Djuanda Kartawidjaja	
11		Johannes Leimena	Parkindo	29 April 1957	5 July 1959	Djuanda	Djuanda Kartawidjaja	

=== Guided democracy era ===
==== Deputy First Minister (1960–63) ====
	Portrait	Name	Party	Took office	Left office	Cabinet	First Minister	Prime Minister	Note
12		Johannes Leimena	Parkindo	18 February 1960	6 March 1962	Working II	Djuanda Kartawidjaja	Sukarno	
13		Johannes Leimena	Parkindo	6 March 1962	13 November 1963	Working III	Djuanda Kartawidjaja	Sukarno	
13		Subandrio	None	6 March 1962	13 November 1963	Working III	Djuanda Kartawidjaja	Sukarno	

==== Deputy Prime Minister (1963–66) ====
	Portrait	Name	Party	Took office	Left office	Cabinet	Prime Minister	Note
13		Subandrio	None	13 November 1963	27 August 1964	Working IV	Sukarno	
13		Johannes Leimena	Parkindo	13 November 1963	27 August 1964	Working IV	Sukarno	
13		Chairul Saleh	Murba	13 November 1963	27 August 1964	Working IV	Sukarno	
14		Subandrio	None	27 August 1964	22 February 1966	Dwikora	Sukarno	
14		Johannes Leimena	Parkindo	27 August 1964	22 February 1966	Dwikora	Sukarno	
14		Chairul Saleh	Murba	27 August 1964	22 February 1966	Dwikora	Sukarno	
15		Subandrio (until 18 March 1966) Hamengkubuwana IX (ad-interim, since 18 March 1966)	None	24 February 1966	27 March 1966	Dwikora II	Sukarno	
15		Subandrio (until 18 March 1966) Hamengkubuwana IX (ad-interim, since 18 March 1966)	None	24 February 1966	27 March 1966	Dwikora II	Sukarno	
15		Johannes Leimena	Parkindo	24 February 1966	27 March 1966	Dwikora II	Sukarno	
15		Chairul Saleh (until 18 March 1966) Adam Malik (ad-interim, since 18 March 1966)	Murba	24 February 1966	27 March 1966	Dwikora II	Sukarno	
15		Chairul Saleh (until 18 March 1966) Adam Malik (ad-interim, since 18 March 1966)	None	24 February 1966	27 March 1966	Dwikora II	Sukarno	
15		Idham Chalid	NU	24 February 1966	27 March 1966	Dwikora II	Sukarno	
15		Ruslan Abdulgani	None	24 February 1966	27 March 1966	Dwikora II	Sukarno	
15		Johannes Leimena (General Affair)	Parkindo	31 March 1966	25 July 1966	Dwikora III	Sukarno	
15		Adam Malik (Social and Political Affairs)	None	31 March 1966	25 July 1966	Dwikora III	Sukarno	
15		Hamengkubuwono IX (Economics, Finance, and Development)	None	31 March 1966	25 July 1966	Dwikora III	Sukarno	
15		Suharto (Defense and Security)	None	31 March 1966	25 July 1966	Dwikora III	Sukarno	
15		Idham Chalid (Governing Bodies)	NU	31 March 1966	25 July 1966	Dwikora III	Sukarno	

== See also ==
- Deputy prime minister
- President of Indonesia
  - List of presidents of Indonesia
- Vice President of Indonesia
  - List of vice presidents of Indonesia
- Prime Minister of Indonesia
- Elections in Indonesia
- Politics of Indonesia
