= Second Hatta Cabinet =

Ninth cabinet of Indonesian government

Second Hatta Cabinet Kabinet Hatta II
- 9th Cabinet of Indonesia
- 1949
- Date formed: 4 August 1949
- Date dissolved: 20 December 1949

People and organisations
- President: Sukarno
- Vice President: Mohammad Hatta
- Prime Minister: Mohammad Hatta
- No. of ministers: 17
- Member party: Masyumi; Indonesian National Party; Indonesian Christian Party; Catholic Party; Great Indonesia Unity Party; Independent
- Opposition party: Socialist Party of Indonesia

History
- Predecessor: Hatta I Cabinet
- Successor: RIS Cabinet (United States of Indonesia); Susanto Cabinet (Republic of Indonesia)

The Second Hatta Cabinet (Indonesian: Kabinet Hatta II) was Indonesia's ninth cabinet. It was formed after the Indonesian leadership, which had been imprisoned by Dutch forces, returned to the capital, Yogyakarta. It served from 4 August to 20 December 1949.

== Cabinet ==
Portfolio	Minister	Political party
Prime Minister	Mohammad Hatta (Note: Mohammad Hatta appointed to lead delegation of Indonesia in Dutch–Indonesian Round Table Conference dan temporarily replaced by Hamengkubuwono IX)	Independent
Deputy Prime Minister	Sjafruddin Prawiranegara	Masyumi
Minister of Foreign Affairs	Agus Salim (until 21 October 1949)	Independent
Minister of Foreign Affairs	Hamengkubuwono IX (ad-interim)	Independent
Minister of Home Affairs	Wongsonegoro	Great Indonesia Unity Party
Minister of Justice	Susanto Tirtoprodjo	PNI
Minister of Information	Samsoeddin	Masyumi
Minister of Finance	Lukman Hakim	Independent
Minister of the Supply of People's Provisions; Minister of Welfare	Ignatius Joseph Kasimo Hendrowahyono	Catholic Party
Minister of Transportation; Minister of Public Works	Herling Laoh	PNI
Minister of Labour and Social Affairs	Koesnan	Independent
Minister of Education and Culture	Ki Sarmidi Mangunsarkoro	PNI
Minister Religious Affairs	Masjkur	Masyumi
Minister of Health	Surono (until 1 December 1949)	Independent
Minister of Health	Johannes Leimena (since 1 December 1949)	Parkindo
Minister of State	Soekiman Wirjosandjojo (Note: Soekiman Wirjosandjojo, Djuanda Kartawidjaja dan Johannes Leimena became member of delegation in Dutch–Indonesian Round Table Conference)	Masyumi
Minister of State	Djuanda Kartawidjaja	Independent
Minister of State	Johannes Leimena	Parkindo
Minister of State	Hamengkubuwono IX	Independent

== Changes ==
Due to Hatta's departure for the Dutch-Indonesian Round Table Conference, from 6 August 1949, via Presidential Decision No. 10/A/1949, Defense Minister Sultan Hamengkubuwana IX became acting Prime Minister. He also became acting Foreign Minister while Agus Salim was unable to perform his duties from 21 October. Effective from 1 December, Dr. Johannes Leimena replaced Minister of Health ad interim Dr. Surono, leaving only two state ministers.

== The end of the cabinet ==
The cabinet was dissolved after a fundamental change in Indonesia's political system with the establishment of the United States of Indonesia, a result of the Round Table Conference. With the coming into force of the Federal Constitution on 20 December, the cabinet was automatically dissolved and replaced by the Republic of the United States of Indonesia Cabinet, also led by Hatta.
