= Republic of Indonesia (1949–1950) =

Former state of the United States of Indonesia

State of the Republic of Indonesia Negara Republik Indonesia
- State of Indonesia
- 1949–1950
- Flag Coat of arms

- The United States of Indonesia. The State of the Republic of Indonesia is shown in red.
- Capital: Yogyakarta
- Government
  - Type: Federal republic
- President
  - 1949–1950: Assaat
- Prime minister
  - 1949–1950: Susanto Tirtoprodjo (acting)
  - 1950: Abdul Halim
- Historical era: Cold War
  - Established as component state of RUSI: 27 December 1949
  - Unitary republic formed: 17 August 1950
- Today part of: Indonesia

The State of the Republic of Indonesia (Indonesian: Negara Republik Indonesia, old spelling: Negara Repoeblik Indonesia, lit. 'State of the Republic of Indonesia') was a federated state (negara bagian) of the United States of Indonesia (RUSI) which was established on 27 December 1949. The territory of the state included parts of Java and most of Sumatra, and its capital was Yogyakarta. The acting president of the Republic was Assaat (Sukarno became president of the RUSI) and the prime minister was first Susanto Tirtoprodjo until 16 January 1950, then Abdul Halim. On 17 August, the United States of Indonesia ceased to exist as the last of the component states dissolved themselves into a unitary Republic of Indonesia encompassing the entire territory of the former Dutch East Indies except for West Papua.

== President ==
Assaat Datuk Mudo was the only president of this Yogyakarta-based republic

Portrait	Name (Birth–Death)	Term of office		
Portrait	Name (Birth–Death)	Took office	Left office	Time in office
	Assaat (1904–1976)	27 December 1949	15 August 1950	231 days

== See also ==
- History of Indonesia
- Indonesian National Revolution
- Indonesian regions
