= Des Alwi =

Indonesian historian, diplomat, writer, and advocate of the Banda Islands

Des Alwi Abubakar (November 17, 1927 – November 12, 2010) was an Indonesian historian, diplomat, writer and advocate of the Banda Islands. He was the adopted son of Mohammad Hatta, the first Vice President of Indonesia, whom he called "Oom Kacamata" ("Uncle Eyeglasses").

== Early life ==
Alwi was born on November 17, 1927, on Banda Neira, the most populous of the Banda Islands in the Moluccas. He first met Mohammad Hatta, as well as Indonesian intellectual Sutan Sjahrir, while Hatta was in internal exile on Banda Neira. Hatta adopted Alwi as his son.

As a teenager he participated in the battle for Surabaya, East Java in 1945.

== Career ==
Alwi's early career included working at the Voice of Indonesia radio station in Yogyakarta. He later studied at King's College in the UK where he met with future Malaysian political leaders, including Tun Abdul Razak.

As a diplomat, Alwi served tenures in several embassies, including in Bern, Vienna and Manila. He became disillusioned with Sukarno's dictatorial tendencies. He controversially settled in Kuala Lumpur at the height of Indonesia's "Konfrontasi" with Malaysia where he engaged, using a pseudonym, in a broadcast to lambaste Sukarno. Alwi played a role in easing political tensions between Indonesia and Malaysia in the 1960s by approaching then Malaysian prime minister Tun Abdul Razak.

In the 1970s, Alwi developed an interest in documentary films when he made a film about Hatta and later made other documentaries. He directed Tanah Gersang (Barren Land) in 1972, Cucu (Grandchild) and a comedy about espionage in 1973.

== Later life ==
Alwi married Anna Marie Mambu, and had four children; Karma Alwi, Mira Alwi and Tanya Alwi and Ramon Alwi.

In the latter stages of his life, he focused much attention and personal investment on his beloved Banda. Des managed a hotel and resort in Banda Naira, with a guest list featuring Diana, Princess of Wales, rock star Mick Jagger and Sarah, Duchess of York. He co-authored a book "Turbulent Times Past in Ternate and Tidore" together with Willard A Hanna on the history of Maluku and Banda Naira.

Des Alwi died in at his home in Permata Hijau, Jakarta on November 12, 2010, at the age of 82.
