= Prime Minister of Indonesia =

Head of government, 1945–1966

Prime Minister of the Republic of Indonesia
- Perdana Menteri Republik Indonesia
- National emblem of Indonesia

- Flag of Indonesia

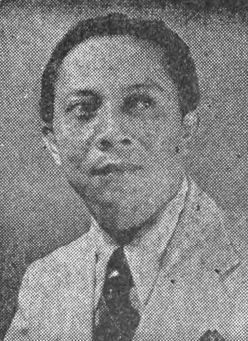
- First holder Sutan Sjahrir; 14 November 1945 – 27 June 1947
- Style: His Excellency
- Member of: Cabinet; Central Indonesian National Committee; House of Representatives
- Residence: Pancasila Building
- Seat: Jakarta
- Appointer: President
- Constituting instrument: Constitution of Indonesia (Vice-Presidential Edict No.X); Provisional Constitution of 1950
- Inaugural holder: Sutan Sjahrir
- Formation: 14 November 1945
- Final holder: Djuanda Kartawidjaja (official); Sukarno (unofficial)
- Abolished: 6 July 1959 (Constitutional basis revoked); 25 July 1966 (Sukarno's resignation)
- Deputy: Deputy Prime Minister

The Prime Minister of the Republic of Indonesia (Indonesian: Perdana Menteri Republik Indonesia) was a political office in Indonesia which existed from 1945 until 1966. During this period, the prime minister was in charge of the cabinet of Indonesia, one of the three branches of government along with the House of Representatives and the president. Following his 1959 decree, President Sukarno assumed the role and powers of prime minister until his resignation in 1966.

== Indonesian National Revolution ==
On 18 August 1945, a day after the Proclamation of Indonesian Independence, Sukarno was appointed president and the 1945 Constitution of Indonesia came into force, which stated that Indonesia was built around a presidential system; as such, there were no constitutional provisions for a prime minister, and the cabinet was directly responsible to the president. However following Vice-Presidential Edict No.X, on 11 November the cabinet was made responsible to the provisional legislature, the Central Indonesian National Committee (Indonesian: Komite Nasional Indonesia Pusat (KNIP)), effectively suspending the constitution. The cabinet was dismissed, and Sutan Sjahrir was asked to become the first prime minister. He agreed to do so on the condition he was allowed to select his own cabinet. The new cabinet was announced on 14 November with the understanding that although the prime minister was responsible to the Working Committee of the KNIP, he had to consult the president before making any major decisions. If the prime minister came into conflict with the KNIP or the president, another could be chosen.

Internal political disputes prompted Sjahrir to resign on 28 March, but he was asked to form the next cabinet. This fell in October, but yet again, Sjahrir agreed to continue as prime minister in the new cabinet. He finally resigned on 27 June, after being fatally weakened by concessions he had made to the Dutch following the signing of the Linggadjati Agreement. He was replaced by Amir Sjarifuddin, and Sjahrir became Indonesian representative at the United Nations. Sjariffuddin in turn resigned in turn following withdrawal of political support in the aftermath of the Renville Agreement. Sukarno then appointed vice-president Mohammad Hatta, asking him to form an emergency cabinet answerable to him rather than to the KNIP.

== United States of Indonesia ==
On 27 December 1949, the Netherlands transferred sovereignty to a federal United States of Indonesia (RUSI), of which the Republic of Indonesia was one state. The Federal Constitution provided for a prime minister, and Hatta became the only prime minister of the RUSI. As this caused a vacuum of power in the Republican administration, Susanto Tirtoprodjo, justice minister in the previous cabinet, was appointed acting prime minister at the head of a transitional cabinet. On 22 January 1950, the new prime minister, announced his cabinet. The terms of both Hatta and Halim ended when the RUSI was dissolved and Indonesia became a unitary state on 17 August 1950 .

== Liberal and Guided Democracy eras ==
Under the constitution of the unitary state, the cabinet was once again responsible to parliament, with the prime minister appointed by the president. Due to the instability of the coalition cabinets, prime ministers often faced votes of no confidence. Every major policy change had a chance to be opposed, either by the government or opposition. As such, some cabinets lasted only a few months.

On 5 July 1959, Sukarno issued a presidential decree declaring that, due to the inability of the Constitutional Assembly of Indonesia to decide on a new constitution, the 1945 Constitution would be reinstated. This removed the constitutional foundation for the office of Prime Minister. However, on 9 July of that same year, Sukarno took on the title of prime minister in addition to the presidency; later using the phrase "I am president and prime minister" as a dominant message in his speeches. After the abortive coup against the government in 1965 and the release of a document transferring all political power to Suharto in 1967, Sukarno lost the title of prime minister together with the presidency.

== List of prime ministers ==
Political parties: PS Masyumi PNI None

No.	Portrait	Name (born–died)	Term of office			Party	Cabinet	Ref.
No.	Portrait	Name (born–died)	Start	End	Duration	Party	Cabinet	Ref.
Republic of Indonesia (until 1949)
1		Sutan Sjahrir (1909–1966)	14 November 1945	27 June 1947	1 year, 232 days	PS	Sjahrir I	
1		Sutan Sjahrir (1909–1966)	14 November 1945	27 June 1947	1 year, 232 days	PS	Sjahrir II	
1		Sutan Sjahrir (1909–1966)	14 November 1945	27 June 1947	1 year, 232 days	PS	Sjahrir III	
2		Amir Sjarifuddin (1907–1948)	3 July 1947	29 January 1948	211 days	PS	Amir Sjarifuddin I	
2		Amir Sjarifuddin (1907–1948)	3 July 1947	29 January 1948	211 days	PS	Amir Sjarifuddin II	
3		Mohammad Hatta (1902–1980)	29 January 1948	20 December 1949 (Note: Hatta—along with much of the government—was exiled to Bangka Island by the Dutch following the success of Operation Kraai. An emergency government was established in Sumatra during Hatta's exile by Sjafruddin Prawiranegara as prime minister.)	1 year, 326 days	Independent	Hatta I	
3		Mohammad Hatta (1902–1980)	29 January 1948	20 December 1949	1 year, 326 days	Independent	Hatta II	
United States of Indonesia (1949–1950)
(3)		Mohammad Hatta (1902–1980)	20 December 1949	6 September 1950	261 days	Independent	RUSI	
Republic of Indonesia (1949–1950)
—		Susanto Tirtoprodjo (1900–1969); Acting	20 December 1949	21 January 1950	33 days	PNI	Susanto	
4		Abdul Halim (1911–1987)	21 January 1950	6 September 1950	229 days	Independent	Halim	
Republic of Indonesia (from 1950)
5		Mohammad Natsir (1908–1993)	6 September 1950	27 April 1951	234 days	Masyumi	Natsir	
6		Soekiman Wirjosandjojo (1898–1974)	27 April 1951	3 April 1952	343 days	Masyumi	Soekiman	
7		Wilopo (1908–1981)	3 April 1952	1 August 1953	1 year, 121 days	PNI	Wilopo	
8		Ali Sastroamidjojo (1903–1976)	1 August 1953	12 August 1955	2 years, 12 days	PNI	Ali Sastroamidjojo I	
9		Burhanuddin Harahap (1917–1987)	12 August 1955	26 March 1956	228 days	Masyumi	Burhanuddin Harahap	
(8)		Ali Sastroamidjojo (1903–1976)	26 March 1956	9 April 1957	1 year, 15 days	PNI	Ali Sastroamidjojo II	
10		Djuanda Kartawidjaja (1911–1963)	9 April 1957	6 July 1959	2 years, 89 days	Independent	Djuanda	
11		Sukarno (1901–1970) (Note: President of Indonesia, appointed himself as prime minister by presidential decree.)	10 July 1959	12 March 1967	7 years, 246 days	Independent	Working I	
11		Sukarno (1901–1970)	10 July 1959	12 March 1967	7 years, 246 days	Independent	Working II	
11		Sukarno (1901–1970)	10 July 1959	12 March 1967	7 years, 246 days	Independent	Working III	
11		Sukarno (1901–1970)	10 July 1959	12 March 1967	7 years, 246 days	Independent	Working IV	
11		Sukarno (1901–1970)	10 July 1959	12 March 1967	7 years, 246 days	Independent	Dwikora I	
11		Sukarno (1901–1970)	10 July 1959	12 March 1967	7 years, 246 days	Independent	Dwikora II	
11		Sukarno (1901–1970)	10 July 1959	12 March 1967	7 years, 246 days	Independent	Dwikora III	
11		Sukarno (1901–1970)	10 July 1959	12 March 1967	7 years, 246 days	Independent	Ampera	

== See also ==
- President of Indonesia
  - List of presidents of Indonesia
- Vice President of Indonesia
  - List of vice presidents of Indonesia
- Deputy Prime Minister of Indonesia
- Elections in Indonesia
- Politics of Indonesia
