= Assaat =

Indonesian subnational state leader (1904–1976)

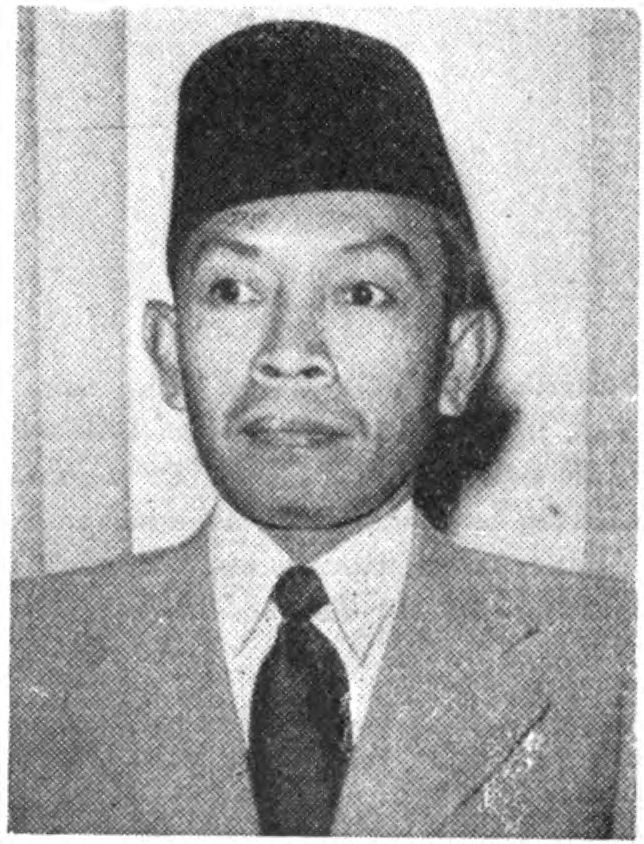
- Portrait, c. 1940s

Acting President of Indonesia
- In office 27 December 1949 – 15 August 1950
- Prime Minister: Susanto Tirtoprodjo (acting); Abdul Halim
- Preceded by: Sukarno
- Succeeded by: Sukarno

9th Minister of Home Affairs
- In office 6 September 1950 – 27 April 1951
- Prime Minister: Mohammad Natsir
- Preceded by: Susanto Tirtoprodjo
- Succeeded by: Iskaq Tjokroadisurjo

Personal details
- Born: Assaat Datuk Mudo; 18 September 1904 Agam, Dutch East Indies
- Died: 16 June 1976 (aged 71) Jakarta, Indonesia
- Spouse: Roesiah (m. 1949)
- Children: 4
- Education: Rechts Hogeschool; Leiden University (Mr.)
- Occupation: Politician; activist

Assaat Datuk Mudo (18 September 1904 – 16 June 1976), also known as Mr. Assaat, was the only President of the Yogyakarta-based Republic of Indonesia before it became the part of the United States of Indonesia, and was in office from December 1949 until August 1950. He was born in Banuhampu, Agam, West Sumatra, Dutch East Indies (now Indonesia). He and a number of Indonesia founders, fought for the independence of Indonesia from the Dutch.

== Education ==
His early education was in Islamic schools and Dutch schools in Indonesia. He studied Islam in Adabiah, Padang and also in MULO (Meer Uitgebreid Lager Onderwijs). He continued his education in STOVIA (School tot Opleiding van Inlandsche Artsen), a medical school in Batavia (now in Jakarta). Feeling unfit to be a physician, he left STOVIA and went to AMS (Algemene Middelbare School) instead. He then continued his education in RHS (Rechts Hogeschool). He completed his education at Leiden University with the title Meester in de Rechten (Master at laws).

== Political activities ==
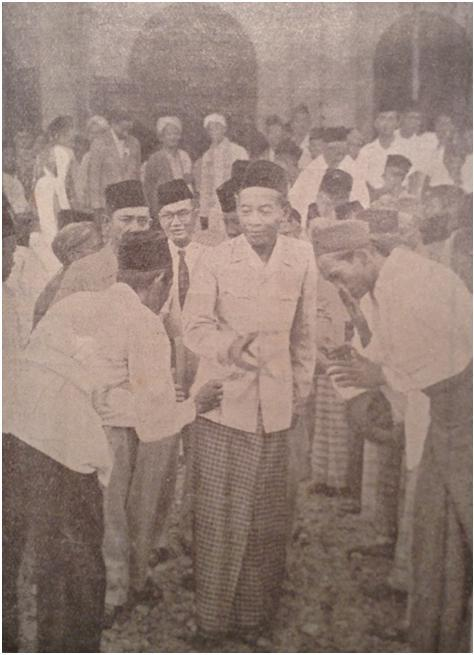
Mr. Assaat, Acting (Provisional) President of the Republic of Indonesia was greeted by residents after a Jumu'ah prayer at Sumedang Mosque during a work visit in West Java in May 1950.

His activities as a politician started in Jong Sumatranen Bond. Afterwards, he joined Perhimpunan Pemuda Indonesia. While in the Rechts Hogeschool, his professors disliked Assat's political activities and Assaat failed his exams. He then joined the Indonesia Party (Partindo) with Adnan Kapau Gani, Adam Malik, and Amir Sjarifuddin. After Indonesian independence, he was elected as head of the Central Indonesian National Committee (KNIP) until Sukarno was captured by the Dutch. Assaat was named President of the Provisional Government of Indonesia until Sukarno's return. In December 1948, the Dutch launched their second "Police Action" and focused their attack on Yogyakarta. Assaat was captured by the Dutch army and sent to exile on Bangka Island along with other nationalist leaders.

After his release, he moved to Jakarta where he became a member of the Provisional People's Representative Council. During Natsir's prime ministership, Assaat was appointed the Minister of Home Affairs. During his time as an influential figure in Indonesian politics Assaat became known for his extremist views against the ethnic Chinese minority of Indonesia. A movement called the "Assaat Movement" began calling for the expulsion of Chinese from Indonesia. On 19 March 1956, during an opening speech for the National Congress of Indonesian Importers Assaat stated "The Chinese as an exclusive group refuse other group to enter, specially in the economy. They were so exclusive that in their practice they become monopolistic." and called for the government to create legislation that would economically benefit the 'pribumi' (non-Chinese Indonesian). In 1959, a presidential decree (PP came into effect. The decree stated that all 'Foreign citizens' in rural areas were to be forcibly 'relocated' to urban areas. The decree oversaw an exodus of a large population of ethnic Chinese (that had been in Indonesia for generations) out of Indonesia.

During the late 1950s, Assaat began to openly criticize Sukarno before moving to his home island of Sumatera to join a short-lived, CIA-backed rebellion of junior officers of the Indonesian army which had called itself the Revolutionary Government of the Republic of Indonesia. Once the rebels were defeated, Assaat was captured, labelled a traitor and jailed for his involvement.
