= Mohammad Hatta =

Vice President of Indonesia from 1945 to 1956

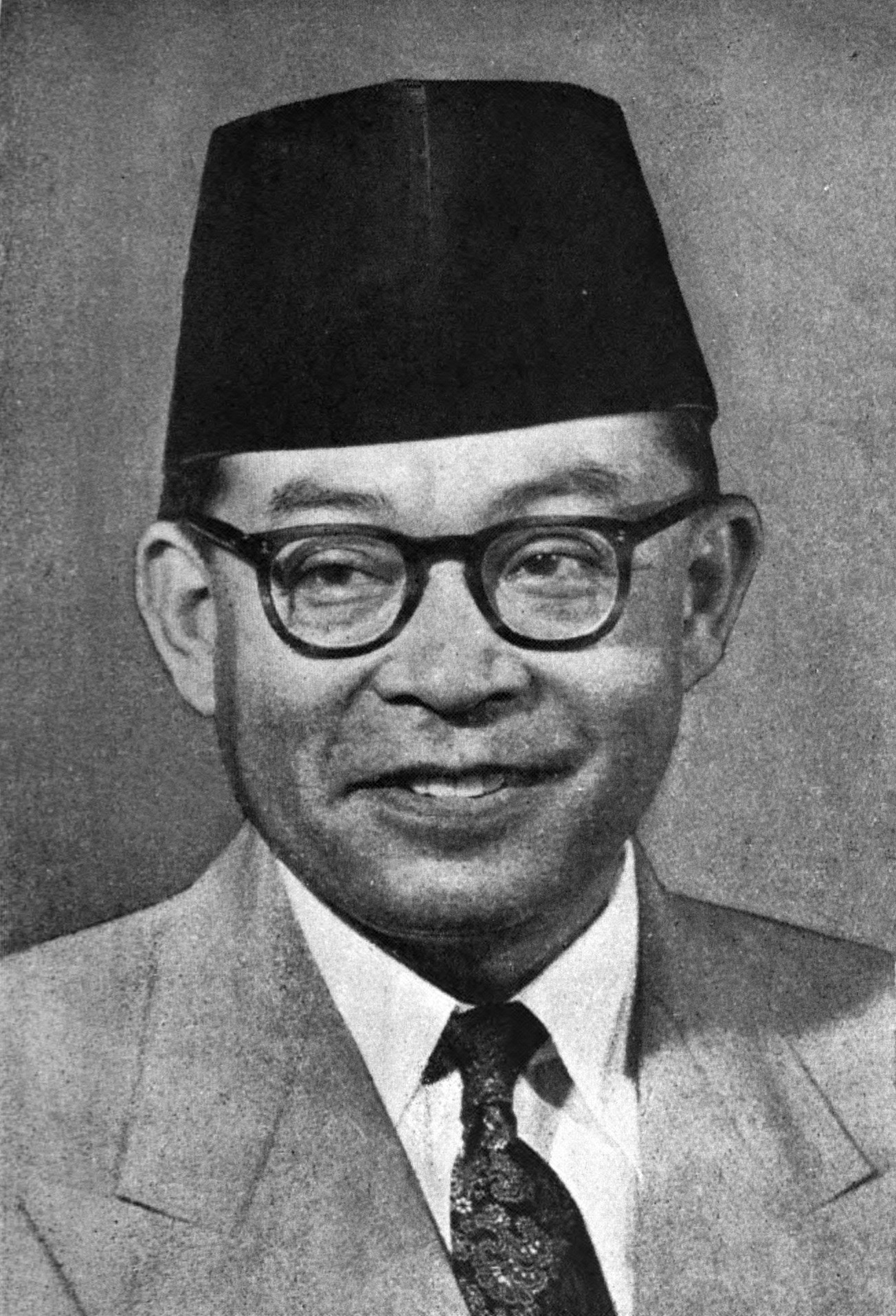
- Official portrait, c. 1950s

1st Vice President of Indonesia
- In office 18 August 1945 – 1 December 1956
- President: Sukarno
- Preceded by: Office established
- Succeeded by: Hamengkubuwono IX (1973)

3rd Prime Minister of Indonesia
- In office 29 January 1948 – 20 December 1949
- President: Sukarno
- Deputy: Sjafruddin Prawiranegara
- Preceded by: Amir Sjarifuddin
- Succeeded by: Susanto Tirtoprodjo (acting); Abdul Halim

Prime Minister of the United States of Indonesia
- In office 20 December 1949 – 6 September 1950
- President: Sukarno
- Preceded by: Office established
- Succeeded by: Mohammad Natsir (as Prime Minister of Indonesia)

Minister of Defense of Indonesia
- Acting
- In office 29 January 1948 – 15 July 1948
- President: Sukarno
- Preceded by: Amir Sjarifuddin
- Succeeded by: Hamengkubuwono IX

Minister of Foreign Affairs of the United States of Indonesia
- In office 20 December 1949 – 6 September 1950
- President: Sukarno
- Preceded by: Agus Salim; Hamengkubuwono IX (acting)
- Succeeded by: Mohammad Roem

1st Chairman of Indonesian Red Cross Society
- In office 1945–1946
- Preceded by: Office established
- Succeeded by: Soetardjo Kartohadikusumo

Personal details
- Born: Mohammad Athar; 12 August 1902 Fort de Kock, Westkust van Sumatra, Dutch East Indies
- Died: 14 March 1980 (aged 77) Jakarta, Indonesia
- Resting place: Tanah Kusir Cemetery
- Party: Independent
- Other political affiliations: PNI (until 1929)
- Spouse: Rachmi Rachim (m. 1945)
- Children: 3, including Meutia Hatta
- Education: Nederlandse Economische Hogeschool (Drs.)
- Occupation: Politician; economist
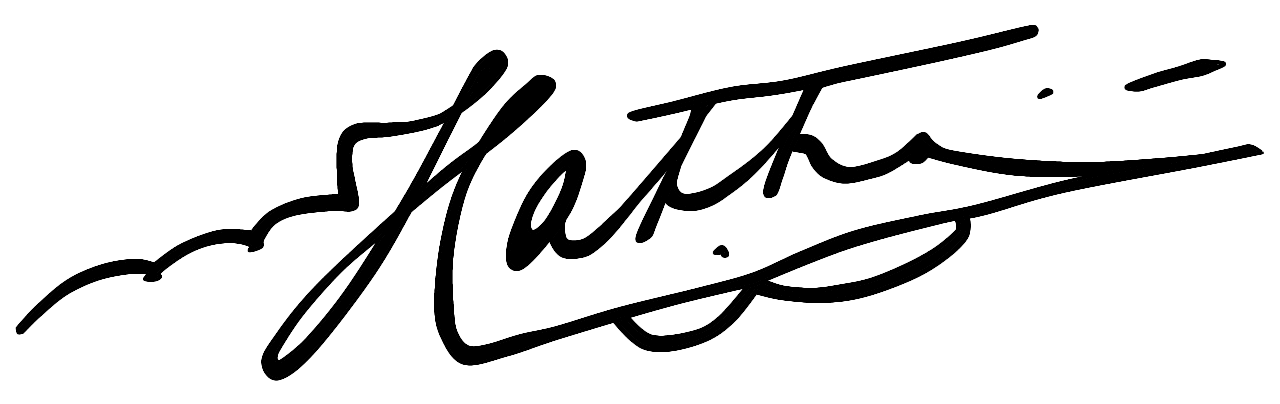
- Signature
- Nickname: Bung Hatta

Mohammad Hatta ( né Athar; 12 August 1902 – 14 March 1980) was an Indonesian statesman, nationalist, and independence activist who served as the country's first vice president as well as the third prime minister. Known as "The Proclamator", he and a number of Indonesians, including the first president of Indonesia, Sukarno, fought for the independence of Indonesia from the Netherlands. Hatta was an important figure during the Indonesian national awakening and during the national revolution. As a youth he was politically active in both the Netherlands and the Indies, which led him to be imprisoned in the Boven Digoel concentration camp for his activism. He also played a crucial role in the proclamation of Indonesian independence, being the second person to sign the declaration besides Sukarno, thus making him one of the founders of Indonesia.

== Early life, family, and early education ==
=== Early life and family ===
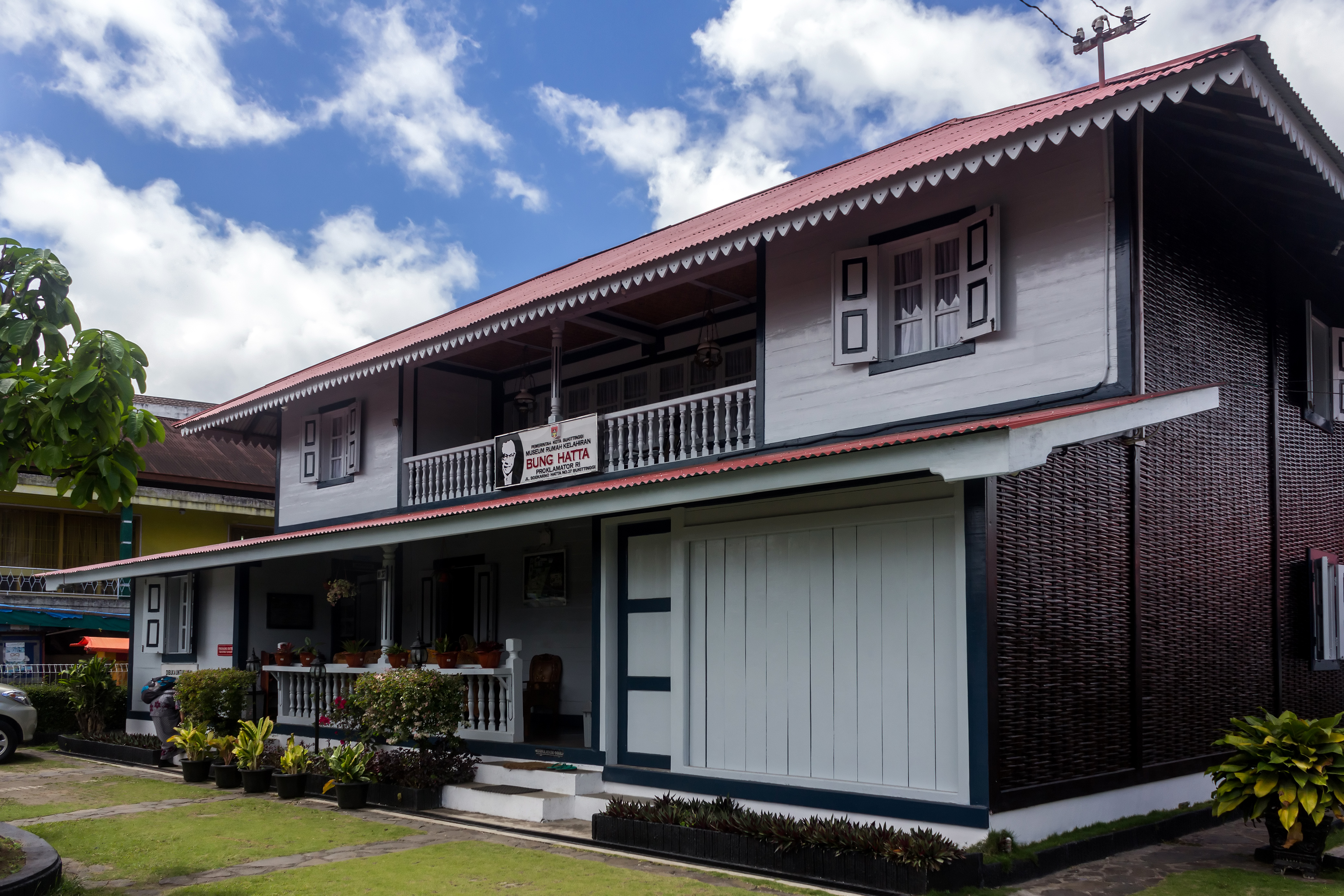
Bung Hatta's birth house, which is now located on Sukarno-Hatta street, Bukittinggi

Hatta was born in Fort De Kock (now known as Bukittinggi) on 12 August 1902 into a prominent and strongly Islamic family. His grandfather, Sheikh Abdurrahman, was a respected Naqshbandi-Khalidi murshid in Batuhampar, near Payakumbuh. His father, Haji Mohammad Djamil, died when he was eight months old and he was left with his six sisters and his mother. As in the matrilineal society of Minangkabau tradition, he was then raised in his mother's family. His mother's family was wealthy, and Hatta was able to study Dutch as well as finishing Qur'an after school.

=== Early education ===
He went to the Dutch language elementary school (ELS or Europeesche Lagere School) in Padang from 1913 to 1916 after he had finished Sekolah Melayu ('Malay School') in Bukittinggi. When he was thirteen, he passed an exam that entitled him to enroll in the Dutch secondary school (HBS or Hogere burgerschool) in Batavia (now Jakarta). However his mother asked him to stay in Padang because he was still too young to go to the capital alone. Hatta then entered junior secondary school or MULO (Meer Uitgebreid Lager Onderwijs).

During his spare time, he worked part-time in a post office. Normally, MULO students were not allowed to work, but he was able to work there because of the HBS exam qualification. Hatta was interested in football; he joined his school's football team and was made its chairman. He broadened his sphere of contacts by using his position.

Hatta used to visit the office of the Sarikat Usaha (United Endeavor), led by Taher Marah Soetan. In the office, he read Dutch newspapers, particularly about political debates in the Volksraad (parliament) of the Dutch East Indies. It was at the age of sixteen that Hatta began to be interested in politics and national movements. He was chosen the treasurer of the branch of the Jong Sumatranen Bond (or youth association of Sumatra), which was first established in Padang in 1918.

== Time in the Netherlands ==
=== Later education ===
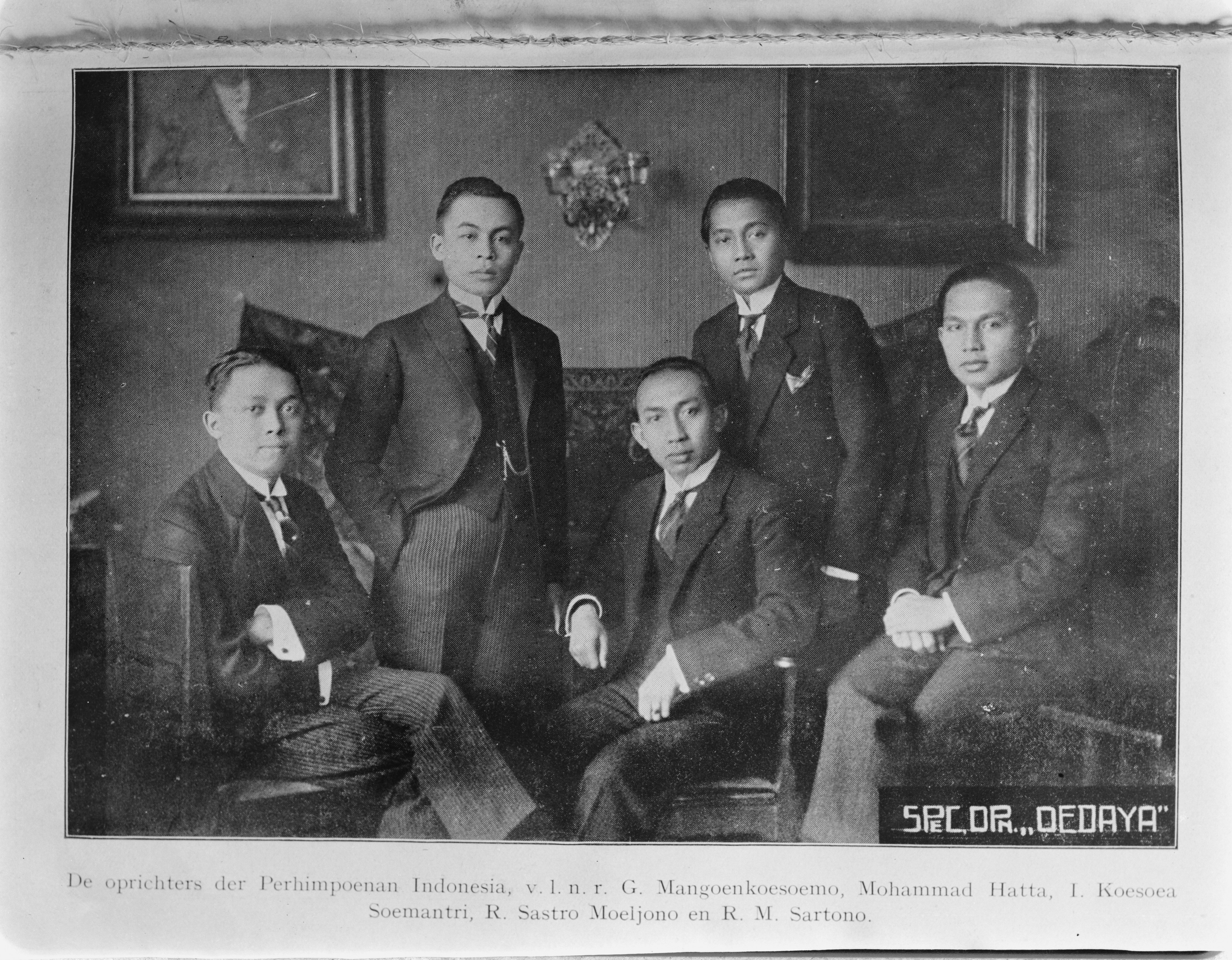
Leaders of Perhimpoenan Indonesia. Left to right: Gunawan Mangunkusumo, Mohammad Hatta, Iwa Kusumasumantri, Sastro Mulyono, and R.M. Sartono

In 1919, Hatta finally went to the HBS in Batavia. He completed his study with distinction in 1921, and was allowed to continue to study at Erasmus University Rotterdam (then known as the Netherlands School of Commerce) in Rotterdam. He took economics as his major and earned a doctorandus degree in 1932. The degree entitled him to follow a doctorate program. He then continued to pursue the doctorate degree, and completed all requirements to be awarded it, but he never finished his thesis. Politics had taken over Hatta's life.

=== Struggle for independence in the Netherlands ===
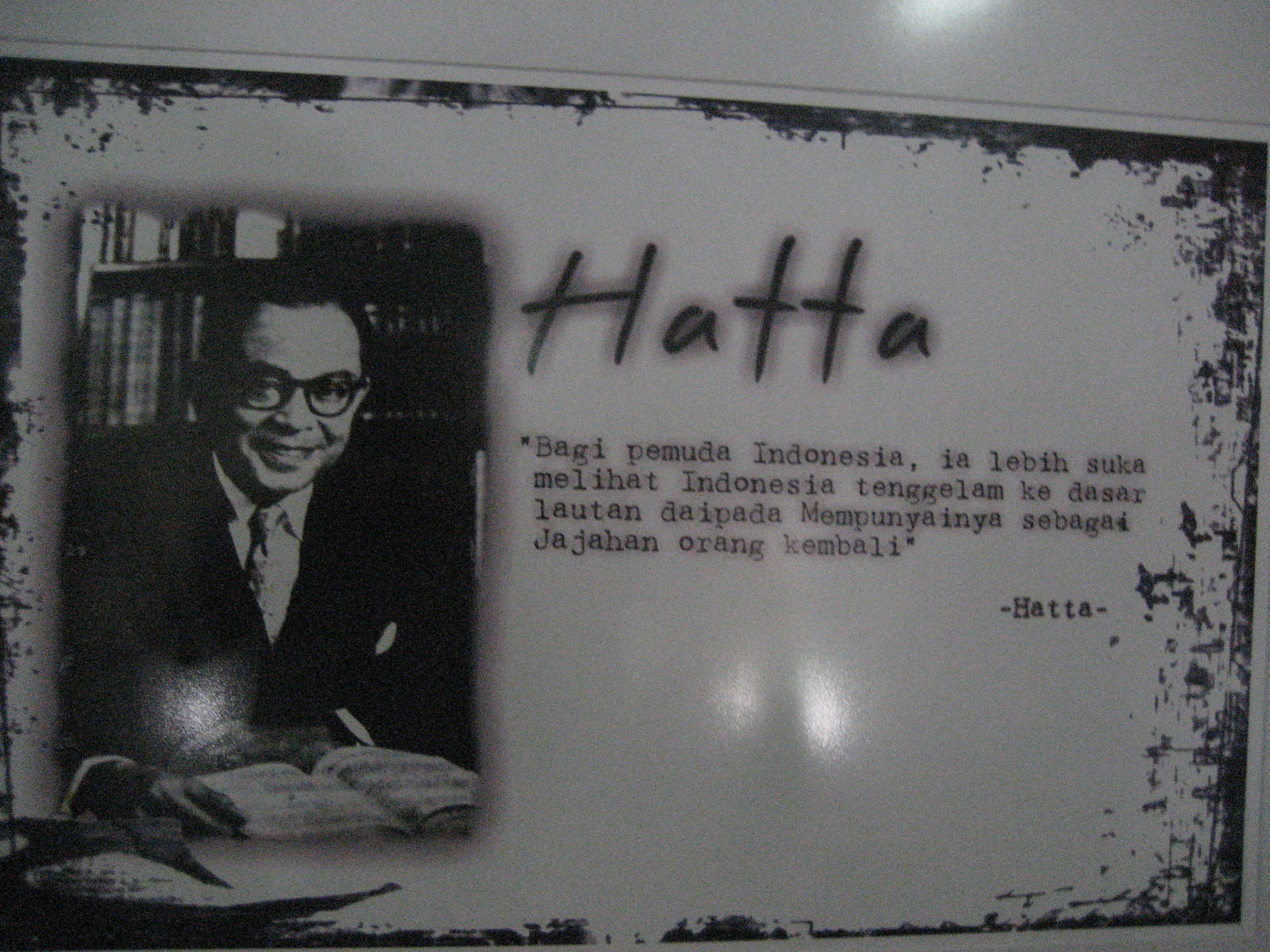
Mohammad Hatta Indonesian statesman, nationalist, and one of the founding fathers

In the Netherlands, Hatta joined the Indische Vereeniging (or the Indies' Association). In 1922, the organization changed its name to Indonesische Vereeniging and later to its Indonesian translation: the Perhimpoenan Indonesia. Hatta was the treasurer (1922–1925), and then the chairman (1926–1930). On his inauguration, Hatta delivered a speech with the title of "The Economic World Structure and the Conflict of Power", in which he supported the idea of Indonesian non-cooperation with the Dutch colonial government in order to gain its independence. The Perhimpoenan Indonesia then changed from being a student organization into a political organization and had an unequivocal demand for Indonesia's independence. It expressed its voice through the magazine called Indonesia Merdeka (or Free Indonesia) of which Hatta was the editor.

To gain more support from other nations, Hatta attended congresses all over Europe, always as the chairman of the Indonesian delegation. In 1926, Hatta and Perhimpoenan Indonesia joined the (sixth) International Democratic Congress for Peace in Marc Sangnier's domaine de Bierville (Boissy-la-Rivière), France. In February 1927, Hatta went to Brussels to attend a congress held by the League Against Imperialism and Colonial Oppression. He met many other prominent nationalists there, including Jawaharlal Nehru from India, Muhammad Hafiz Ramadan Pasha from Egypt and Lamine Senghor from Senegal. Later in the year, Hatta attended another congress held by the International Women's League for Peace and Freedom in Switzerland. On that occasion, Hatta delivered a speech with the title of "Indonesia and her Independence Problem".

By the middle of 1927, Perhimpoenan Indonesia's activities had alarmed the Dutch authorities. In June 1927, Dutch authorities raided the residence of the organization's leaders, searching through their rooms and putting Hatta and other four other Indonesian activists behind bars. After spending nearly six months in prison, they were taken to trial in the Hague. They were permitted to explain themselves during the hearing, and Hatta took to the opportunity to explain Indonesia's nationalist cause. He made a speech to the court explaining that Indonesia's interests were in conflict with those of the Dutch, and that was why they could not cooperate.

Hatta advocated cooperation between Indonesia and the Netherlands, but only if Indonesia was independent and treated as an equal partner, not unequally because of its status as a colony. The speech became famous and it is known as the Indonesia Vrij (Indonesia Merdeka) or Free Indonesia speech. In 1929, Hatta and other Perhimpoenan Indonesia activists were released. In July 1932, Hatta made his way home to Indonesia.

== Return to Indonesia ==
=== Struggle in the Dutch East Indies ===
==== The Indonesian National Party ====
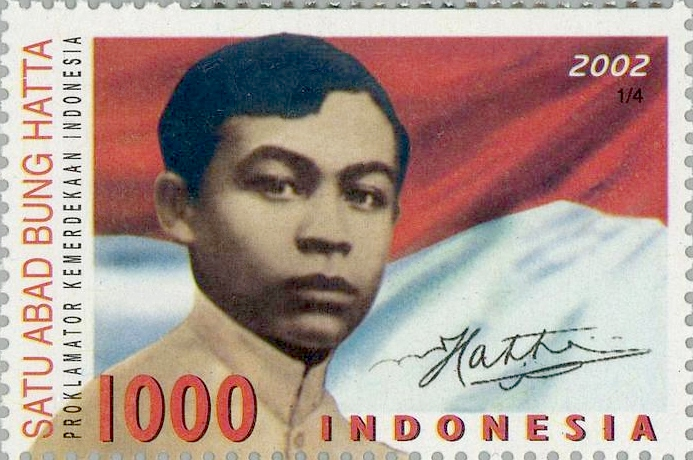
Hatta on a 2002 Indonesian postage stamp

Hatta returned home in 1932 to an Indonesia whose nationalist momentum had been slowed down by the arrest and imprisonment of Sukarno. By the time Hatta had returned, most of the members of Sukarno's PNI had joined the Indonesia Party (Partindo) and more radical PNI members, together with the Dutch-educated Sutan Sjahrir had banded together to form the New PNI. Although the initials were the same, the PNI in this case stood for the Indonesian National Education, indicating that it would focus on cadre training. In August 1932, after returning from the Netherlands, Hatta became the chairman of the New PNI.

In December 1932, Sukarno was finally released from prison and the attention now turned to which party Sukarno would choose. Sukarno, who had wanted one united front to gain Indonesia's independence was uncertain, thinking that in choosing one over the other, he would encourage division. In this, he was criticized by Hatta, who was more pragmatic about differences, in this case the conflict between Partindo's radical and mass party approach versus the New PNI's moderate and cadre party approach. Sukarno insisted on negotiations to unify Partindo and New PNI but after failing, chose to join Partindo.

Between 1932 and 1933, Hatta wrote articles on politics and economics for the New PNI's newspaper Daulat Rakyat (The People's Authority). These articles were aimed at training new cadres for Indonesia's leadership.

Hatta seemed to be extremely critical of Sukarno at this point in time. In August 1933, with Sukarno once again arrested and facing trial, he wrote an article called "Sukarno Is Arrested". This was followed by articles entitled "The Tragedy of Sukarno" (November 1933) and "The Stance of a Leader" (December 1933).

==== Arrest and exile ====
The Dutch colonial government gave Sukarno a harsh punishment, exiling him to Ende on the island of Flores in December 1933. With Sukarno in exile, the Dutch colonial government now turned their eyes to the New PNI and its leadership. In February 1934, they made their move and arrested its leaders from its Jakarta branch (which included Hatta) and its Bandung branch. For a year they were jailed at prisons in Cipinang and Glodok, with Hatta spending his time in Glodok prison. During his time in prison, Hatta wrote a book entitled "The Economical Crisis and Capitalism".

In January 1935, it was decided that Hatta and his fellow New PNI leaders (including Syahrir) would be exiled to Boven Digoel in Papua. When Hatta arrived there, he was told by the local authorities that he had two options. The first option was to work for the Dutch Colonial Government as a civil servant for 40 cents a day with the hope of returning from exile, and the second option was being an exile, receiving food but having no hope of returning from exile. Hatta commented if he had decided to take a job as a civil servant in Jakarta, he would have earned a lot of money and knowing that, there was no need to go to Boven Digoel to be paid cheaply. In saying this, Hatta chose the second option.

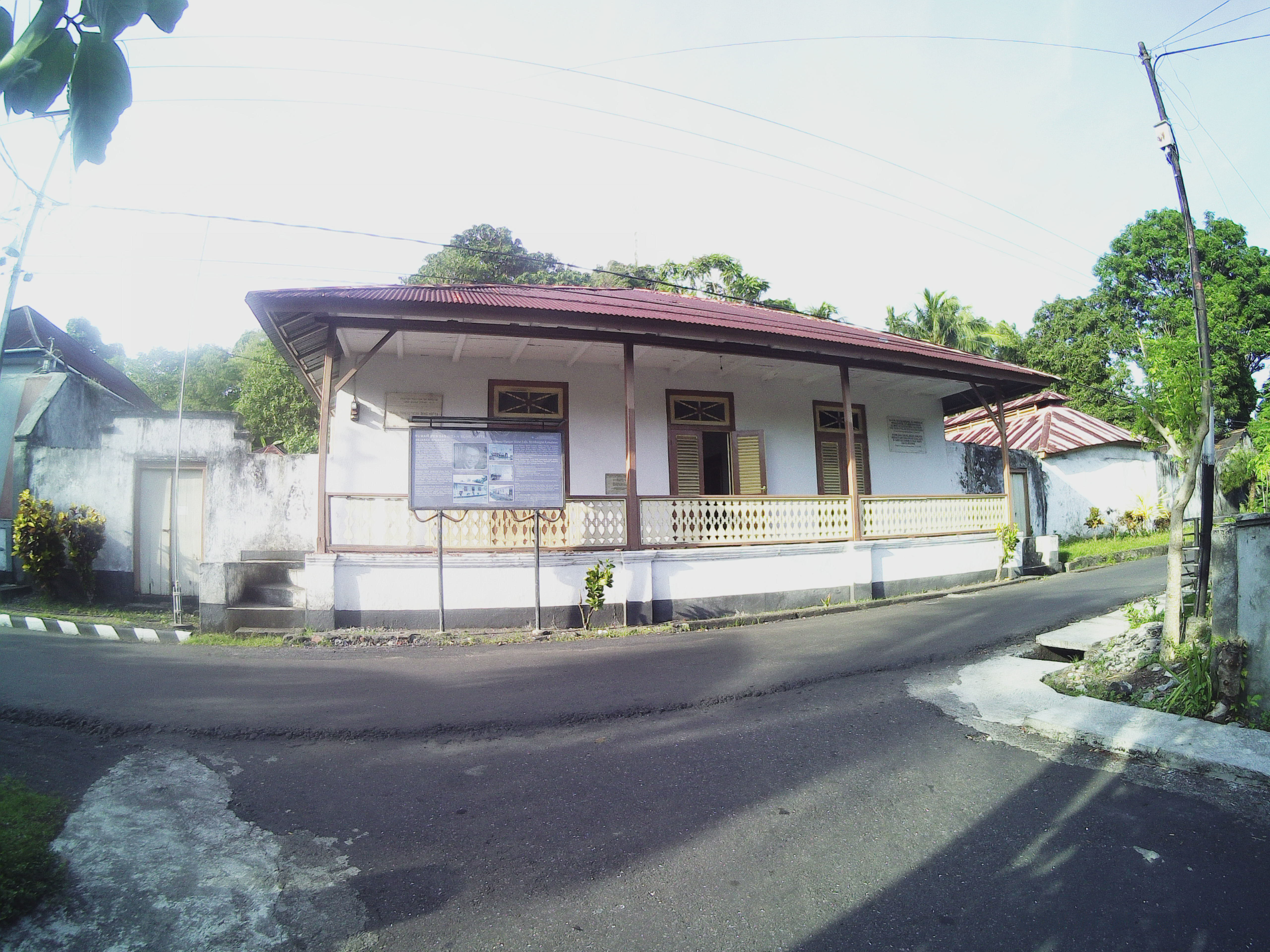
Hatta's home in Bandaneira, currently a museum.

During his exile, Hatta continued to write articles, this time for the Newspaper Pemandangan (The View). He earned enough money from that to make ends meet at Boven Digoel and to support his colleagues who had financial troubles. Hatta also used his books (which filled 16 chests when they were packed to leave Jakarta) to give his colleagues lessons on economics, history, and philosophy. Later on these lessons would be made into books entitled "An Introduction on the Way to Knowledge" and "The Nature of Greek Thought" (four volumes).

In January 1936, Hatta and Syahrir were transferred to Bandaneira in Maluku. There they joined more nationalists such as Iwa Kusumasumantri and Dr. Cipto Mangunkusumo. Hatta and Syahrir were given more freedom and were able to interact with the locals. Hatta and Syahrir also gave lessons to the local children, teaching them about politics and history. Hatta adopted a local boy, Des Alwi, as his son while living in Bandaneira. Alwi would become a prominent Indonesian historian and diplomat. In February 1942, Hatta and Syahrir were transferred to Sukabumi in West Java.

=== Japanese occupation ===
==== Japanese invasion ====
By 1942, World War II was well under way and the Empire of Japan was fulfilling its imperial ambitions in East Asia and Southeast Asia. In March 1942, they began landing in Indonesia. Like their counterpart in Europe, the Dutch colonial government crumbled in the face of the invaders and by 9 March 1942, surrendered. On 22 March 1942, Hatta and Syahrir were again transferred to Jakarta.

In Jakarta, Hatta met with Major General Kumakichi Harada, the interim head of government. Harada asked Hatta to become an advisor for the occupational Government. Hatta accepted the job and then asked Harada if Japan was here to colonize Indonesia. Harada assured Hatta that Japan would not do. In Hatta's eyes, an acknowledgement of an Indonesian independence by Japan was extremely important. If Japan, with its ultra-nationalistic ideology was able to recognize Indonesia's independence, it would put more pressure on the Allies (especially the United States and the United Kingdom) as representatives of democracy to do the same thing. In July 1942, Hatta was reunited with Sukarno who after Flores had been transferred to Sumatra before the Japanese arrived, and had also been asked for his services. Although they had left off on a bad note, Sukarno wanted to speak with Hatta before speaking with anyone else. In a secret meeting at Hatta's Jakarta home Sukarno, Hatta and Sjahrir agreed that Sjahrir would go underground to organise the revolutionary resistance while the other two would commence their cooperation with the Japanese occupier.

==== Collaboration with the Japanese ====
Hatta and Sukarno now had the common goal of working with the Japanese and then trying to achieve independence from them. Together with Ki Hadjar Dewantoro and Muhammadiyah chairman, Kiai Haji Mas Mansur, Hatta and Sukarno formed a quattuorvirate of leaders tasked by the Japanese occupational Government as their intermediary with the Indonesian people. Hatta together with the other members of the quattuorvirate worked with much fervor under the Japanese government. They echoed Japanese propaganda and presented the Japanese Empire as the protector, leader, and the light of Asia. At the same time however, Hatta continued to promote Indonesia's desire for independence. In a speech in December 1942, Hatta said that Indonesia had been freed from the Dutch colonial government, but if they were freed only to be colonized by another power, he would rather see Indonesia drown to the bottom of the ocean.

On 9 March 1943, the Japanese occupational government approved the formation of the Centre of People's Power (Putera) with Hatta and the other quattuorvirate as the co-chairmen of the association. Sukarno thought that this would be a way from which they could gain support for independence, instead the Japanese used this to their own cause and to start their romusha (forced labour) regime in Indonesia. On 4 October 1943, Hatta, along with Sukarno and other nationalist figures was appointed to the Javanese Central Advisory Council, which was by set up the occupation government. In November 1943, Hatta and Sukarno's efforts in cooperating with the Japanese occupational government was recognized by Emperor Hirohito who decorated them with awards in Tokyo.

As the tide of the war began to turn against the Japanese, the Japanese occupational government in Indonesia became desperate to maintain control. Putera was disbanded and replaced with Djawa Hokokai in March 1944. Although still chaired by Sukarno, the Indonesians had less freedom of movement than they had had in Putera. When defeat began looming on the horizon, Prime Minister Kuniaki Koiso announced in September 1944 that Japan would grant Indonesia its independence in the near future. From then on, momentum began to gather for the independence of Indonesia, fuelled by the nationalist sentiments of Indonesians and supported by sympathizers from Japan such as Rear Admiral Tadashi Maeda. In Maeda's case, he even set up a discussion forum called the Free Indonesia Centre and invited Hatta and Sukarno along to deliver lectures on nationalism. This was followed in April 1945, by the formation of the Investigating Committee for Preparatory Work for Independence (BPUPK), which would meet over the next three months and would decide on things such as the constitution and which territories would be part of Indonesia.

== Proclamation of independence ==
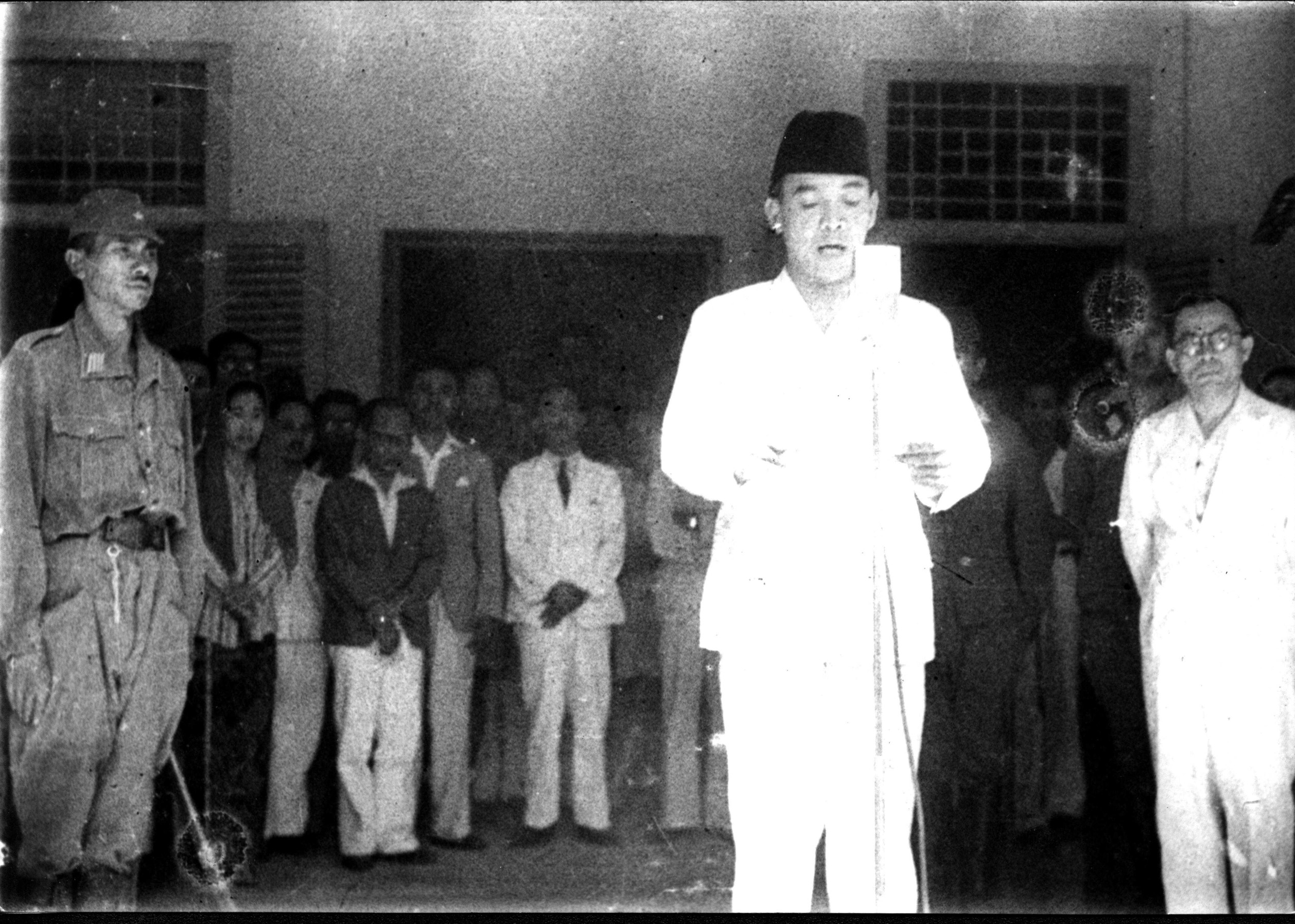
Sukarno, accompanied by Mohammad Hatta, declaring the independence of Indonesia.

By August 1945, as Japan was on the eve of defeat, the administration finally approved Indonesian Independence and formed the Preparatory Committee for Indonesian Independence (PPKI) to supervise it. On 8 August 1945, Hatta and Sukarno were summoned to Saigon, to meet with Marshal Terauchi, the Commander-in-Chief of the Japanese forces in South East Asia. Terauchi told Hatta and Sukarno that the PPKI would be formed on 18 August and that Indonesia would be independent with Japanese supervision.

=== Japanese surrender ===
Hatta and Sukarno returned to Indonesia on 14 August. In Hatta's case, Syahrir was waiting for him with news of the atomic bombs in Hiroshima and Nagasaki. Syahrir told Hatta that they would have to encourage Sukarno to proclaim Indonesia's independence immediately, because in a couple of days the Japanese might not be there to provide supervision. Syahrir told Hatta not to worry about the Japanese authorities because the people would be on their side. Syahrir and Hatta then went to see Sukarno, with Syahrir repeating his argument in front of Sukarno. Hatta then spoke out, saying that he was worried the Allies would see them as Japanese collaborators. Sukarno shared this sentiment and Syahrir left the meeting out of frustration.

The next day, on 15 August 1945, Japan surrendered to the Allies. In Indonesia, the news was only a rumor and had not been confirmed. Hatta and Sukarno went to the office of the Japanese occupational government in Jakarta, only to find it empty. Hatta and Sukarno then went to Maeda who confirmed that Japan had surrendered to the Allies. Hatta and Sukarno seemed shocked that Japan had surrendered. During the afternoon, Hatta and Sukarno were confronted by Indonesian youths who wanted independence to be proclaimed as soon as possible. A heated exchange followed, with Sukarno telling the youths to have more patience. Hatta, who was aware of this and Sukarno's superiority in the exchange, sarcastically commented on the youths' inability to proclaim independence without Sukarno.

=== Kidnapping and proclamation ===
On the morning of 16 August 1945, Indonesian youths kidnapped both Hatta and Sukarno and took them to the town of Rengasdengklok where they continued trying to force Hatta and Sukarno to declare independence, but without success. In Jakarta, there was panic as the PPKI was due to start meeting that day and had planned to elect Sukarno as chairman and Hatta as vice chairman. When knowledge of Hatta and Sukarno's whereabouts became available and the Japanese surrender was confirmed, Achmad Subardjo, a PPKI representative, went to Rengasdengklok to break the news to Hatta and Sukarno. That night, Hatta and Sukarno returned to Jakarta where, at Maeda's house, they worked on the Proclamation of Independence. Finally, on 17 August 1945, at Sukarno's residence, Indonesia's independence was finally proclaimed in a short statement on paper signed by both Sukarno and Hatta.

=== Election as vice president ===
On 18 August 1945, Hatta was selected as Indonesia's first vice president by the PPKI to accompany Sukarno, who had been elected as the nation's first president. Hatta would make three important decisions in the republic's early days. On 16 October, an edict issued by Hatta gave the Central National Committee of Indonesia (KNIP) legislative powers in addition to its advisory role to the president. In the same month, Hatta also authorized the formation of political parties in Indonesia. The next month, in November, Hatta also made the decision which took away the president's role as Head of Government and transferred it to a prime minister. Hatta was able to make these crucial decisions because Sukarno was unable to attend the meetings in question, leaving Hatta in charge. For his part, Sukarno did not seem to have a problem with Hatta's decisions, at least not during the War of Independence.

== National revolution ==
=== Early revolution ===
When the Dutch began sending their troops back to Indonesia, Hatta, together with Syahrir and Sukarno, all agreed that a diplomatic solution must be worked out. This caused tensions with more radical elements within the government such as youth leaders Chairul Saleh and Adam Malik. In January 1946, Hatta and Sukarno moved to Yogyakarta, leaving Syahrir (who was by then prime minister) to head negotiations in Jakarta.

By the end of 1946, the diplomatic solution which Hatta and Sukarno had been looking for seemed to have been found. The Linggadjati Agreement, signed in November 1946, called for Dutch recognition of the Republic of Indonesia. However, territorial recognition would only be over Java, Sumatra, and Madura. In addition, this republic would be part of a United States of Indonesia with the Queen of the Netherlands acting as the Head of State. However, before the agreement was finally ratified by the Dutch House of Representatives, some compromises were made without the consent of the republic. In turn, Indonesia refused to implement its part of the deal, resulting in the first "Police Action" in July 1947.

During this time, Hatta was sent out of the country to look for support for Indonesia. One country that he went to was India, the homeland of his old friend, Jawaharlal Nehru whom he had first met at the Congress of Opressed Nationalities at Brussels in 1927. Disguised as an airplane co-pilot, Hatta sneaked out of the country to ask for assistance. There he asked Nehru and Mahatma Gandhi for help. Nehru assured him that India would support Indonesia and would make the support known at international forums such as the United Nations (UN).

In December 1947, negotiations were held aboard USS Renville and an agreement was signed in January 1948. This agreement was more favorable towards the Dutch and called for the republic to recognize the territories which the Dutch had taken during the first "Police Action". The agreement caused outrage and caused Amir Sjarifuddin to resign from his position as prime minister.

=== Prime ministership ===
To replace Syarifuddin, Sukarno appointed Hatta as prime minister and declared that the cabinet would be an emergency one and would be answerable to the President instead of the KNIP. Hatta also took on the position of minister of defense. As prime minister, Hatta had to make an unpopular decision. In August 1948, with the republic struggling to pay its troops, Hatta was forced to demobilize some soldiers.

In December 1948, the Dutch launched their second "Police Action" and focused their attack on Yogyakarta. Hatta and Sukarno, instead of running away to fight guerrilla warfare chose to remain in the city and were arrested. Sukarno transferred authority to the Emergency Government of the Republic of Indonesia (PDRI), before going into exile with all the other Republican leaders. Hatta was sent to Bangka.

Mohammed Hatta on the day of his departure to Indonesia after the 1949 Round Table conference in The Hague

Resistance continued under General Sudirman and TNI troops who fought a guerrilla war against the Dutch. In March, Sultan Hamengkubuwono IX organized 1 March General Offensive, in which the city of Yogyakarta was held by Indonesian forces for six hours. This played an important role in causing international pressure to be put on the Netherlands. In May 1949, the Roem–Van Roijen Agreement was signed and the Netherlands promised to return the leaders of the Republican Government. In July 1949, Hatta and Sukarno made their return to Yogyakarta.

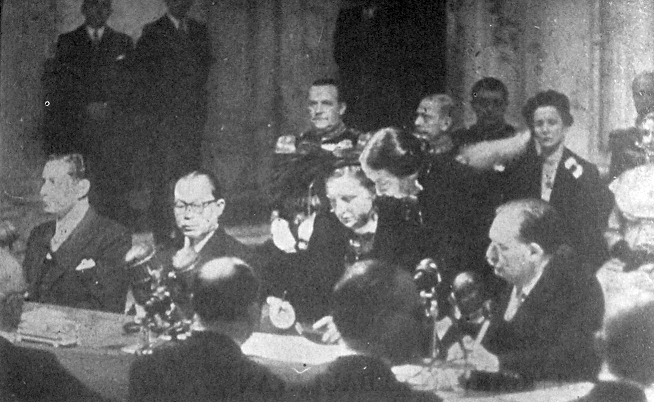
Indonesian Vice President Hatta and Dutch Queen Juliana signing the recognition of sovereignty of the Republic of Indonesia

In August 1949, Hatta headed a delegation to the Hague for a Round Table conference. In November 1949, the formation of the United States of Indonesia was finally agreed. It was to be a federation consisting of the Republic and 15 States which the Dutch had created during the National Revolution. The Queen of the Netherlands would continue to become the symbolic head of state while Sukarno and Hatta would continue as president and vice president. On 27 December 1949, the Dutch authorities finally recognized Indonesian sovereignty. Hatta continued on as the Prime Minister of the United States of Indonesia and presided over the transition of the federal state to the unitary state, which was made official on 17 August 1950.

== Vice presidency (1945–1956) ==
=== Intellectual pursuits and cooperatives ===
Indonesia soon adopted a constitution which advocated parliamentary democracy and reduced the president to the role of a ceremonial head of state. That left Hatta with little to do as vice president, especially since his term as prime minister was not renewed.

For his remaining time as vice president, Hatta was regularly invited to deliver lectures in universities. He also engaged in intellectual pursuits, writing essays and books about topics such as the economy and cooperatives. The idea of cooperatives being an integral part of economy would become a pet project for Hatta and he would become an enthusiastic promoter of the idea. In July 1951, on the occasion of Cooperatives Day, Hatta went on the radio to deliver a speech on cooperatives. In 1953, Hatta's contribution towards promoting cooperatives was recognized and he was given the title "Father of Indonesian Cooperatives" at the Indonesian Cooperative Congress.

=== Setting Indonesia's foreign policy doctrine ===
Aside from cooperatives, Hatta's other main contribution to Indonesia governance was the setting of the nation's foreign policy doctrine. In 1948, Hatta delivered a speech called "Rowing Between Two Rocks". In it, he referred to the Cold War and the conflict between the United States and the Soviet Union. Hatta said that Indonesian foreign policy has to look after its own interest first, not that of the US and the USSR. In saying this, Hatta wanted Indonesia to be independent in deciding its stance during the Cold War. Hatta also added that Indonesia should be an active participant in world politics so that once again it would be Indonesia's interests that came first. This doctrine, which would become known as the "Independent and Active" doctrine, continues to be the basis of Indonesian foreign policy.

=== Retirement ===
==== Announcement and cause ====
In 1955, Hatta announced that when the new People's Representative Council (DPR) as well as the Constitutional Assembly, a body commissioned to create a new constitution, were formed as a result of the year's legislative and assembly elections, he would retire from the vice presidency. He announced this intention in a letter to Sukarno.

On the surface, it seemed as if Hatta was retiring for practical reasons. Because the presidency was a ceremonial role, this made the office of vice president pointless, and Hatta thought that the country was wasting a lot of money paying his wages. There were also personal reasons, however. As a man who believed in democracy, Hatta was beginning to feel disillusioned with Sukarno's increasing autocracy and authoritarianism. Hatta had continued to advise Sukarno against taking this road but he was ignored. Hatta finally gave up and thought that he could no longer work with Sukarno. On 1 December 1956, Hatta officially resigned from the vice presidency.

==== Aftermath ====
Hatta's retirement caused shockwaves all around Indonesia, especially for those of non-Javanese ethnicity. In the eyes of non-Javanese people, Hatta was their main representative in a Javanese-dominated Government. The impact of Hatta's retirement was evident in the Revolutionary Government of the Republic of Indonesia (PRRI) rebellion which wanted to break free from Indonesia, and the Universal Struggle (Permesta) movement, which asked for decentralization. In negotiations with the central government, both PRRI and Permesta listed the reunification of the Sukarno/Hatta leadership as one of the concessions that they wanted from the central government.

== Post-vice presidency (1956–1980) ==
=== Government critic ===
Now outside the government, Hatta began to openly criticize Sukarno. One of his criticisms was Sukarno's lack of commitment towards national development. Hatta said that the revolution ended with the Dutch recognition of Indonesian sovereignty and that the government's focus should be on development. Sukarno rejected this idea outright and responded to it during his 1959 Independence Day speech by saying that the revolution was not over.

In 1960, Hatta wrote a book called Our Democracy. In it, he criticized Sukarno's Guided Democracy as another form of dictatorship. Sukarno immediately banned the book. The same year Sjahrir's political party, the Socialist Party of Indonesia was banned and two years later he was imprisoned on conspiracy charges. Hatta wrote a personal letter to Sukarno calling the arrest 'colonial' and 'non-rational', but to no avail. The old revolutionary trinity had definitively broken down.

=== The New Order ===
==== Transition to the New Order ====
During the tumultuous time which saw the presidency changed hands from Sukarno to General Suharto, Hatta remained in the background. However, he would break his silence in June 1970, just a week before Sukarno died. In a letter to Suharto, Hatta said that he was disappointed that Sukarno was put under house arrest instead of being put on trial. Hatta's reason for this was not malicious: he just wanted matters relating to 30 September Movement coup attempt of 1965 to be cleared up and for Sukarno to be given a chance to defend his actions, as many believed that he was not guilty.

==== Corruption investigation commission ====
Hatta's involvement with Suharto's government came at the beginning of 1970 when protests were made about corruption within it. In January 1970, Suharto appointed Hatta, along with three others as members of a commission to investigate corruption within the government. The results of the commission's investigation was never revealed to public until they leaked in July 1970. It then became apparent that the suspicions of the protesters were correct: there was widespread corruption within the government. Controversially, however, in August 1970, Suharto disbanded the commission and allowed the government to investigate only two corruption cases: the Pertamina and Bulog corruption cases.

==== Institute for Constitutional Awareness Foundation ====
In July 1978, together with Abdul Haris Nasution, Hatta set up the Institute for Constitutional Awareness Foundation (YLKB), set up to act as a forum for critics of Suharto's regime. Suharto's government moved quickly and did not allow YLKB to conduct its first meeting in January 1979. The YLKB did not give up. In August 1979, it managed to hold a meeting which DPR members attended. Perhaps significantly, members of the Indonesian Military also attended. During the meeting, Nasution criticized the New Order for not fully implementing the Pancasila state ideology and the 1945 Constitution.

=== Death ===
Hatta died on 14 March 1980 at 18:56 at Cipto Mangunkusumo Hospital, Jakarta, after eleven days of being treated there. The next day, he was buried at his residence on Jalan Diponegoro 57, Jakarta and buried at the Tanah Kusir Public Cemetery in South Jakarta. Jakarta was greeted with a state ceremony led directly by the then Vice President, Adam Malik. He was designated as a proclaiming hero in 1986 by the Suharto government.

== Personal life ==
Hatta did not want to get married until Indonesia was independent.

His daughter, Meutia Farida Hatta previously served as Minister for Women's Empowerment in Susilo Bambang Yudhoyono's Cabinet. She currently serves as President of the Indonesian Justice and Unity Party.

== Legacy ==
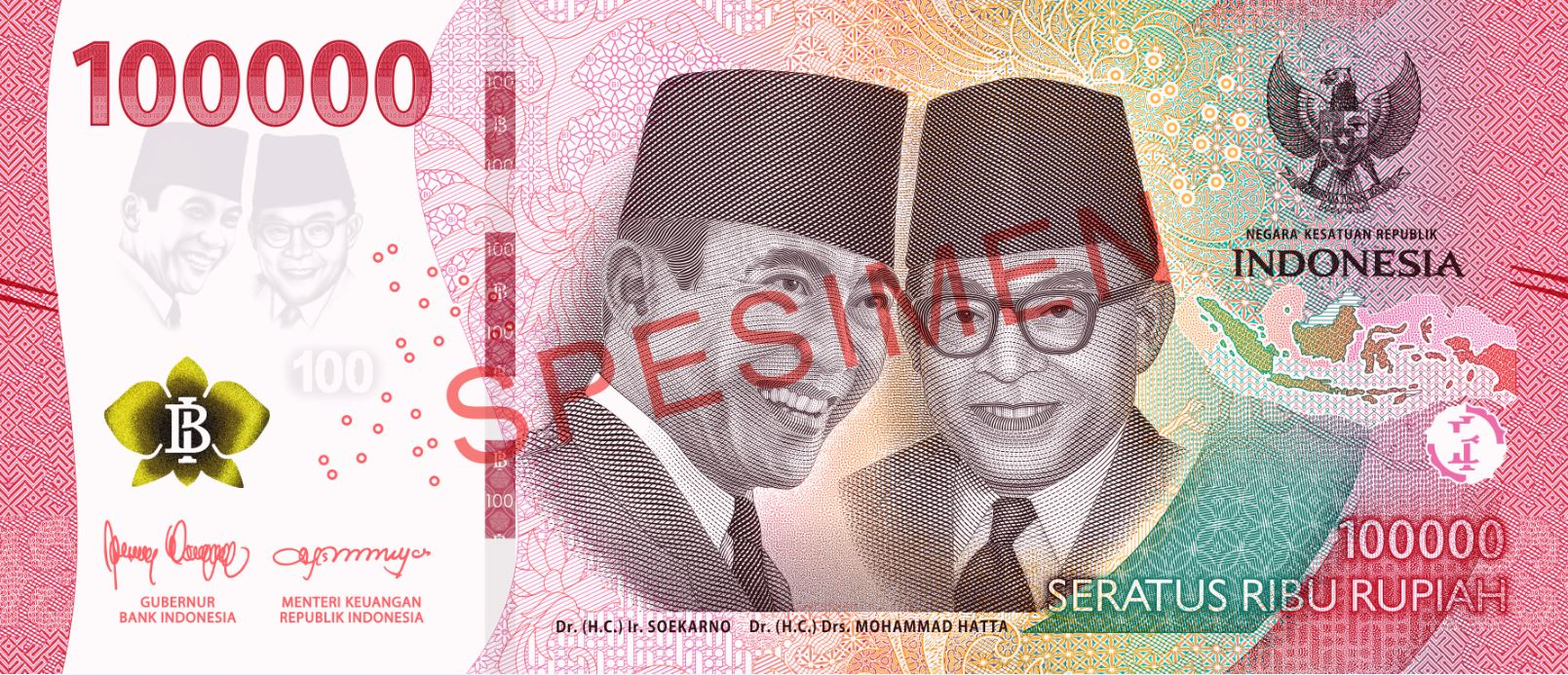
100,000 rupiah banknote featuring Sukarno and Mohammad Hatta, issued in 2022

Soekarno-Hatta International Airport is named in his honor. In 2014, a dormitory building for international students at the Erasmus University Rotterdam campus was named after Hatta. In 2025, a locally-built warship of the Indonesian Navy, KRI Bung Hatta, was named after him.

== Publications ==
- Mohammad Hatta (1957). The Co-operative Movement in Indonesia. Ithaca, N.Y.: Cornell University Press.
- Mohammad Hatta (November 1961). "Colonialism and the Danger of War". Asian Survey. 1 (9): 10–14. doi:10.2307/3023504. JSTOR 3023504.
- Mohammad Hatta (March 1965). "One Indonesian View of the Malaysia Issue". Asian Survey. 5 (3): 139–143. doi:10.2307/2642403. JSTOR 2642403.

== Awards and honours ==
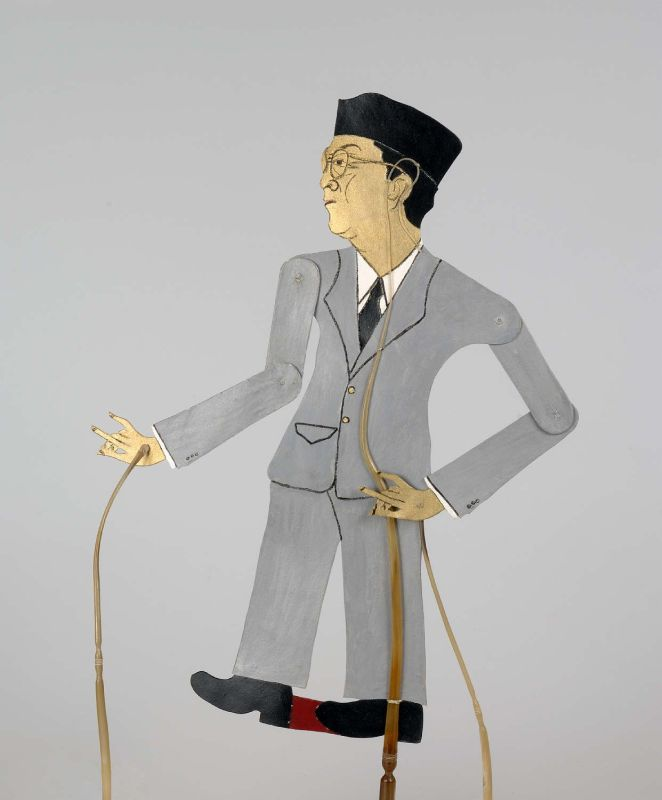
Hatta depicted in a contemporary Wayang Kulit puppet.

=== Honours ===
==== National honours ====
- Star of the Republic of Indonesia, 1st Class (1972)
- Bintang Gerilya (1952)

==== Foreign honours ====
- Empire of Japan
  - Order of the Sacred Treasure (1943)

=== Awards ===
- Honorary doctorate, University of Indonesia (1958)

Political offices
New office Indonesian independence	Vice President of Indonesia; 18 August 1945 – 1 December 1956	Succeeded by Hamengkubuwono IX
Preceded by Amir Sjarifuddin	Prime Minister of Indonesia; 29 January 1948 – 6 September 1950	Succeeded by Mohammad Natsir
