= Mohammad Natsir =

5th prime minister of Indonesia from 1950 to 1951

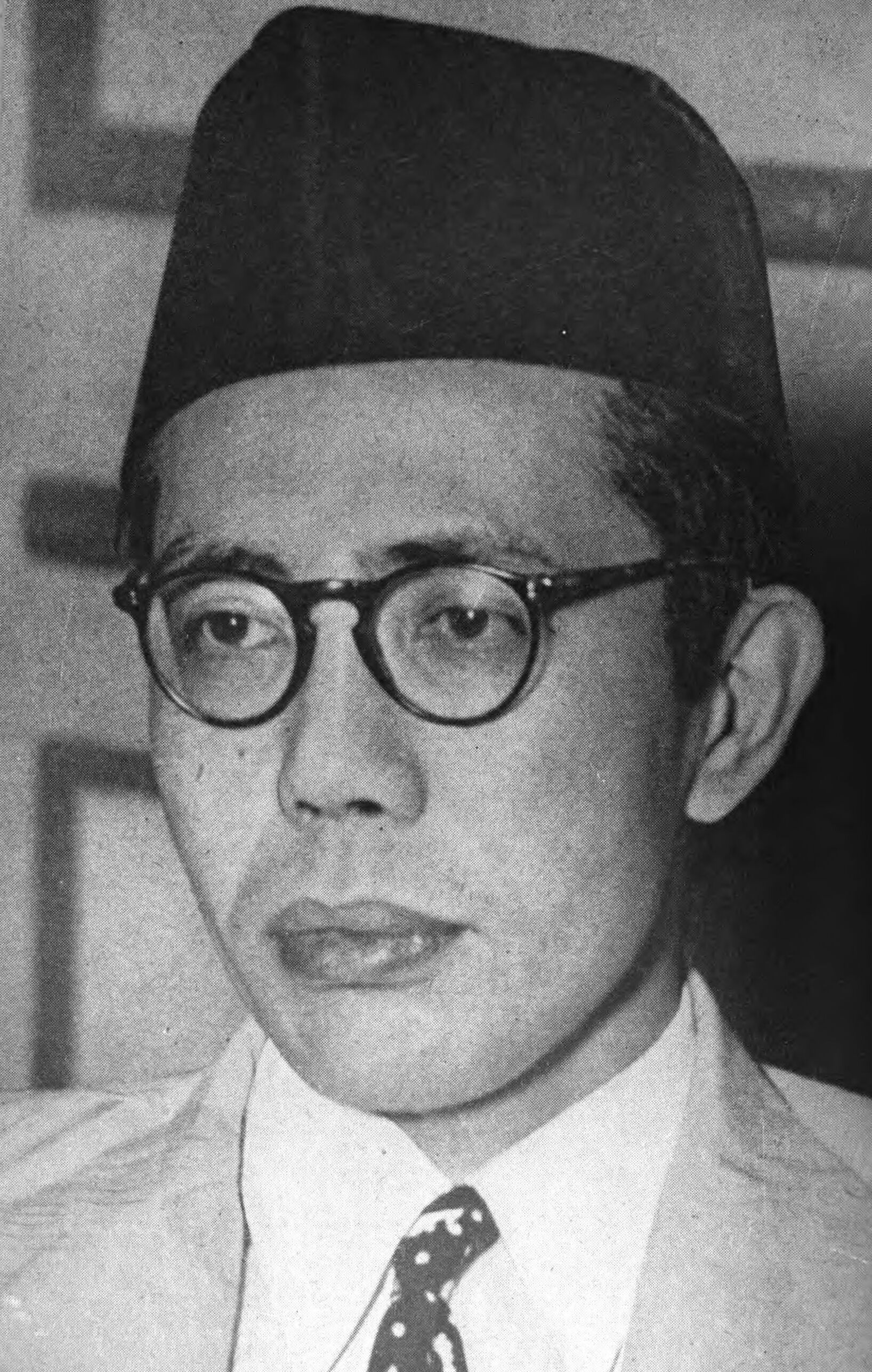
- Portrait of Natsir, c. 1950s

5th Prime Minister of Indonesia
- In office 6 September 1950 – 27 April 1951
- President: Sukarno
- Deputy: Hamengkubuwono IX
- Preceded by: Mohammad Hatta (RUSI); Abdul Halim (Indonesia)
- Succeeded by: Soekiman Wirjosandjojo

Acting Minister of Defense
- In office 17 December 1950 – 27 April 1951
- President: Sukarno
- Prime Minister: Himself
- Preceded by: Abdul Halim
- Succeeded by: Raden Mas Sewaka

2nd Minister of Information
- In office 29 January 1948 – 4 August 1949
- President: Sukarno
- Prime Minister: Mohammad Hatta
- Preceded by: Sjahbudin Latif
- Succeeded by: Sjafruddin Prawiranegara
- In office 12 March 1946 – 26 June 1947
- President: Sukarno
- Prime Minister: Sutan Sjahrir
- Preceded by: Amir Sjarifuddin
- Succeeded by: Setiadi Reksoprodjo

Personal details
- Born: 17 July 1908 Solok, Dutch East Indies
- Died: 6 February 1993 (aged 84) Jakarta, Indonesia
- Party: Masyumi
- Spouse: Nurnahar (m. 1934; died 1991)
- Education: Algemene Middelbare School/SMA Negeri 3 Bandung
- Occupation: Politician; scholar
- Awards: National Hero of Indonesia

Mohammad Natsir (17 July 1908 – 6 February 1993) was an Islamic scholar and politician. He was Indonesia's fifth prime minister.

After moving to Bandung from his hometown Solok, West Sumatra for senior high school, Natsir studied Islamic doctrine extensively. His first articles were published in 1929, and during the 1930s he wrote for several Islamic-themed papers. He entered politics in the mid-1930s, rising through the ranks of Islamic parties. On 5 September 1950, he was chosen as prime minister, a term which he served until 26 April 1951. After his term as prime minister, he became increasingly vocal about Islam's role in Indonesia and was eventually arrested for doing so. Released in 1966 after the New Order government took power, Natsir continued to be critical of the government, eventually leading to him being banned from traveling. He died in his home in Jakarta on 6 February 1993.

Natsir wrote extensively on Islam, totaling 45 books and hundreds of articles. He viewed Islam as an intrinsic part of Indonesian culture and was disappointed by the Sukarno and Suharto government's handling of the religion. He was given three honorary doctorates during his lifetime, one from Lebanon and two from Malaysia. On 10 November 2008, Natsir was honoured as a national hero of Indonesia.

== Early life and education ==
Natsir was born in Solok, West Sumatra on 17 July 1908. His parents were Mohammad Idris Sutan Saripado, a government employee, and Khadijah. In 1916, he studied at HIS (Hollandsch-Inlandsche School) Adabiyah, Padang. After a few months, he moved to HIS Solok, studying there by day and at the Madrasah Diniyah by night. Three years later, he moved to HIS Padang together with his older sister. In 1923, he continued his studies at MULO (Meer Uitgebreid Lager Onderwijs) and he joined Pandu Nationale Islamietische Pavinderij and Jong Islamieten Bond. He also learned to play the violin.

After graduating he moved to Bandung, where he studied at an AMS (Algememe Midelbare School, or senior high school). Natsir later said that he had chosen the school for its Western classics class. From 1928 until 1932, he became the chairman of JIB Bandung. He then received a teaching permit after studying for two years at a native teachers' training college. Although he had previously studied Islam in West Sumatra, while in Bandung he took a deeper interest in the religion, including subjects such as the interpretation of the Quran, Islamic jurisprudence, and dialectics; he later studied under Ahmad Hassan, the leader of Persatuan Islam.

== Early career ==
While still in high school, Natsir became involved in journalism. In 1929 he wrote two articles published in the Algemeen Indische Dagblad, entitled "Qur'an en Evangelie" ("The Quran and the Evangelicals") and "Muhammad als Profeet" ("Muhammad as the Prophet"). He also collaborated with other thinkers to publish the newspaper Pembela Islam (Defenders of Islam) from 1929 to 1935 and wrote extensively about his views on the religion for Pandji Islam (Banner of Islam), Pedoman Masyarakat (Guide for the People), and Al-Manār (The Torch). Aside from writing, Natsir founded Pendidikan Islam (Islamic Education), a private school, in 1930; the school was shut down after the Japanese occupation of the Dutch East Indies.

Natsir began to associate with well-known scholars of Islam like Agus Salim, and in the mid-1930s he took Salim's place in discussing the relationship between Islam and the state with future-president Sukarno. In 1938, he enrolled as a member of Partai Islam Indonesia (The Indonesian Islamic Party), and became the chairman of the Bandung branch from 1940 until 1942. He was also employed as the Bandung Bureau Head of Education until 1945. During the Japanese occupation, he joined Majelis Islam A'la Indonesia (changed to Majelis Syura Muslimim Indonesia later), and became one of its chairmen from 1945 until the party was banned.

== Prime ministership ==
After the Proclamation of Indonesian Independence, he became a Central Indonesian National Committee member. On 3 April 1950, he proposed a motion called Mosi Integral Natsir, that united Indonesia after an agreement that divided Indonesia into seventeen states. Soon afterward, he became prime minister, influenced by his role as the head of Masyumi. He served until 1951.

== Post-prime ministership ==
In the Guided Democracy era, he opposed the government and joined the Revolutionary Government of the Republic of Indonesia. As a result, he was arrested and imprisoned in Malang from 1962 until 1964. He was released by the New Order government in July 1966.

After his release from prison, Natsir became increasingly involved with organizations related to Islam, including the Majlis Ta'sisi Rabitah Alam Islami and Majlis Ala al-Alami lil Masjid, both in Mecca, the Oxford Centre for Islamic Studies in England, and the World Muslim Congress in Karachi, Pakistan. In New Order era, he formed the Indonesian Islamic Propagation Council. He also criticized government policy, like when he signed the Petisi 50 (Petition of Fifty) on 5 May 1980, which caused him to be banned from going overseas.

== Death and legacy ==
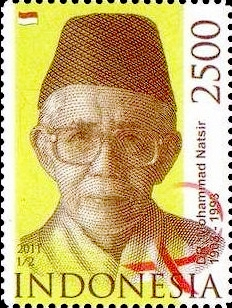
Natsir on a 2011 Indonesian stamp

He died on 14 March 1993 in Jakarta. In 1980, he received an award from the King Faisal Foundation. In academics, he received a doctorate honorary degree from the Islamic University of Lebanon in 1967 for literature. In 1991, he also received an honorary doctorate from Universiti Kebangsaan Malaysia and Universiti Sains Malaysia for Islamic ideas. On 10 November 2008, he was honoured as a national hero of Indonesia. According to Bruce Lawrence, Natsir was "the most prominent politician favoring Islamic reform."

== Politics and views ==
According to Natsir, his politics were religiously motivated, with ayat 56 of the Adh-Dhariyat as justification. His goal as a politician was to ensure that the Muslim community lived in a state where Islamic teachings "applied in the life of an individual, society, and the state of the Republic of Indonesia". He also fought for human rights and the modernization of Islam.

Unlike the secular, pro-communist Sukarno, who viewed religion as an entity separated from the nation, Natsir believed that the separation of church and state did not apply to Indonesia, as he saw it as an intrinsic part of their culture and one of the main reasons they fought for independence. To support his position, he often quoted William Montgomery Watt, saying that Islam is not just a religion, but an entire culture. After independence, Natsir became increasingly disheartened by how Sukarno, and later Suharto, dealt with religion, writing in the early 1970s that Indonesia was treating Islam as one would treat "a cat with ringworms [sic]". He later began trying to bring Pancasila, the state philosophy of Indonesia, completely by Islam.

== Writings ==
Natsir published 45 books or monographs and several hundred articles dealing with his views of Islam. His early works, published in Dutch and Indonesian, dealt with Islamic doctrine, culture, the relationship between Islam and politics, and the role of women in Islam. His later works included some written in English and focused more on politics, as well as the preaching of Islam and Christian-Muslim relations. Ajip Rosidi and Haji Abdul Malik Karim Amrullah have noted that Natsir's writings serve both as historical records and also as guides for future Muslims.

== Personal life ==
He married Nurnahar in Bandung on 20 October 1934. From their marriage, they had six children. Natsir could reportedly speak numerous languages, including English, Dutch, French, German, and Arabic; he was also capable of understanding Esperanto.

== See also ==
- Islam in Indonesia

Political offices
Preceded by Mohammad Hatta; Abdul Halim	Prime Minister of Indonesia; 6 September 1950 – 27 April 1951	Succeeded by Soekiman Wirjosandjojo
