= Abdul Halim (Indonesian politician) =

Indonesian prime minister (1911–1987)

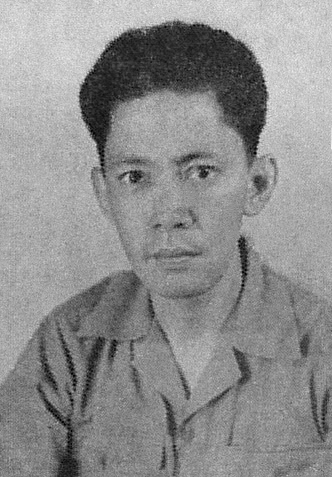
- Abdul Halim, 1950

4th Prime Minister of Indonesia
- In office 21 January 1950 – 6 September 1950
- President: Assaat
- Deputy: Abdul Hakim Harahap
- Preceded by: Mohammad Hatta; Susanto Tirtoprodjo (acting)
- Succeeded by: Mohammad Natsir

6th Minister of Defense
- In office 6 June 1950 – 17 December 1950
- President: Sukarno
- Prime Minister: Mohammad Natsir
- Preceded by: Hamengkubuwono IX
- Succeeded by: Mohammad Natsir (acting); Raden Mas Sewaka

Personal details
- Born: 27 December 1911 Fort De Kock, Westkust van Sumatra, Dutch East Indies
- Died: 4 July 1987 (aged 75) Jakarta, Indonesia
- Party: Independent
- Education: Geneeskundige Hogeschool
- Occupation: Politician; physician

Abdul Halim (27 December 1911 – 4 July 1987) was an Indonesian politician, who served as the 4th prime minister of Indonesia.

== Family and education ==
Abdul Halim was born on 27 December 1911, in Bukittinggi, West Sumatra, to Achmad St. Mangkuto and Hj. Darama. At the age of 7, Abdullah, his mother's cousin, who at that time was one of the leaders of Bataafsche Petroleum Maatscappij (BPM – now known as Pertamina) took him to Jakarta in order to obtain a better education. Halim attended HIS, MULO, AMS B and Geneeskundige Hogeschool (medical school) in Jakarta.

== Career ==
Abdul Halim was involved in various activities, from the politics to education to sports. He was the fourth Prime Minister of the Republic of Indonesia during the period January 1950 – September 1950. He was also the first Minister of Defense of the Republic of Indonesia (September 1950 in the Natsir Cabinet). Halim also made a contribution in the establishment of the Emergency Government of the Republic of Indonesia (PDRI) in Central Sumatra, together with Johannes Leimena and Mohammad Natsir. As a doctor, Abdul Halim was the director of RSUP (now Dr. Cipto Mangunkusumo Hospital, or RSCM) from July 1951 until July 1961, and worked as Inspector General until his death on 4 July 1987.

Away from politics, Halim, who had a hobby playing football, was involved in the formation of the Voetbalbond Indonesische Jacatra team (now Persija) in 1928, and was the Chairman of VIJ (Persija) for several years. From 1951 to 1955 he was Vice Chairman and then Chairman of the Olympic Committee of Indonesia (KOI). Halim was appointed chairman of the National IKADA Foundation to build the Ikada Stadium Merdeka Field, Central Jakarta. In 1952 he led the first Indonesian contingent to participate in the Olympics. Halim briefly served as advisor to University of Indonesia Faculty of Medicine dean Djamaloeddin in 1976.

Political offices
Preceded by Mohammad Hatta; Susanto Tirtoprodjo (acting)	Prime Minister of Indonesia; 21 January 1950 – 6 September 1950	Succeeded by Mohammad Natsir
Preceded by Hamengkubuwono IX	Minister of Defense; 1950–1951	Succeeded by Mohammad Natsir (acting); Raden Mas Sewaka
