= Susanto Tirtoprodjo =

Indonesian politician

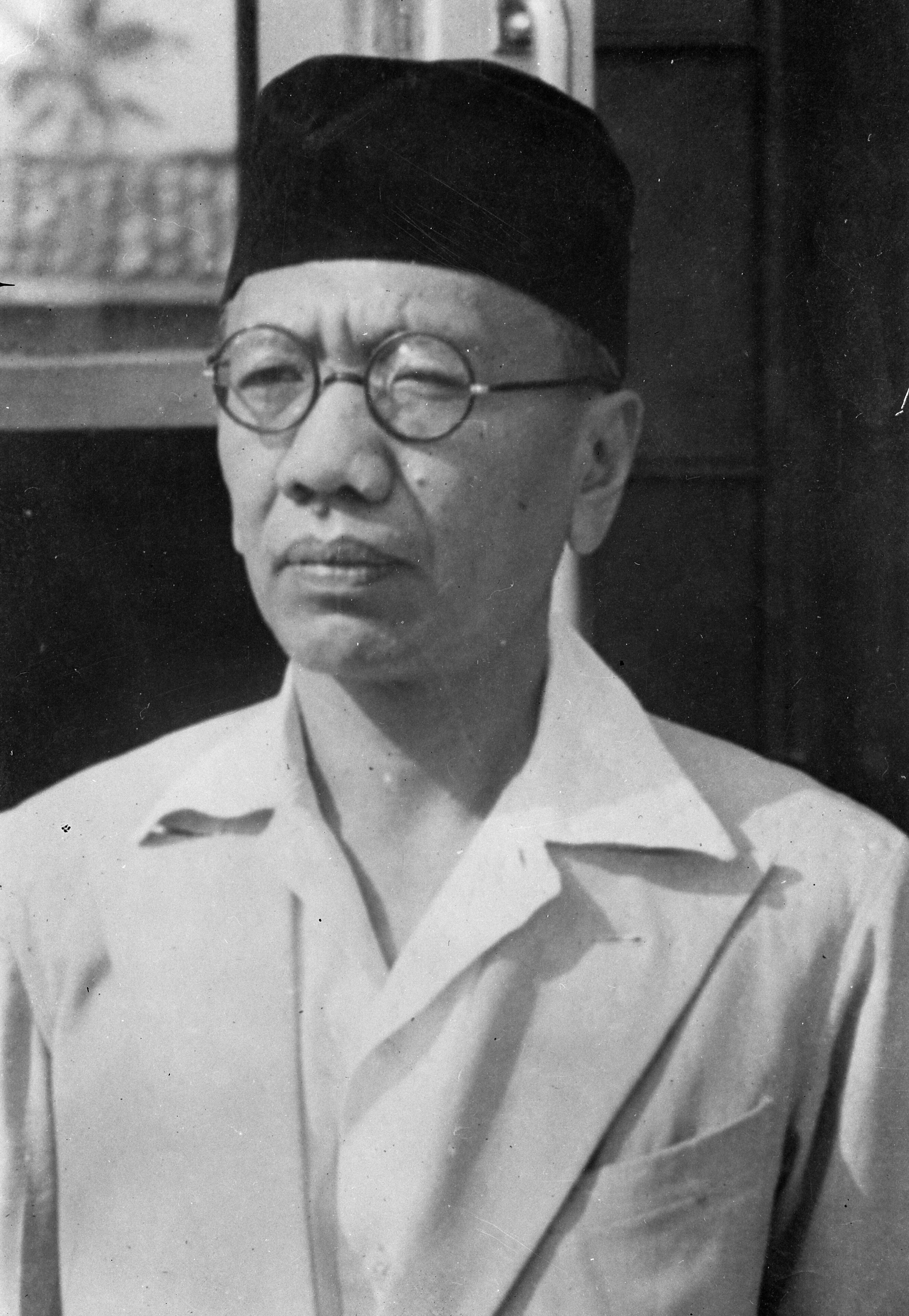
- Susanto Tirtoprodjo, 1947

Prime Minister of Indonesia
- Acting
- In office 20 December 1949 – 21 January 1950
- President: Assaat
- Preceded by: Mohammad Hatta
- Succeeded by: Abdul Halim

8th Minister of Home Affairs
- In office 20 December 1949 – 6 September 1950
- Prime Minister: Himself; Abdul Halim
- Preceded by: Wongsonegoro
- Succeeded by: Assaat

3rd Minister of Justice
- In office 2 October 1946 – 21 January 1950
- Prime Minister: Himself
- Preceded by: Soewandi
- Succeeded by: Abdoel Gaffar Pringgodigdo

2nd Governor of Lesser Sunda
- In office 16 October 1950 – 5 April 1952
- Preceded by: I Gusti Ketut Pudja
- Succeeded by: Sarimin Reksodihardjo (Acting)

Personal details
- Born: 3 March 1900 Soerakarta, Dutch East Indies
- Died: 16 November 1969 (aged 69) Surakarta, Indonesia
- Party: PNI; Parindra
- Spouse: Raden Ayu Wasiti Tinah
- Children: Susantinah Tirtoprodjo; Sutiono Tirtoprodjo; Susantini Tirtoprodjo; Modjo Tirtoprodjo
- Education: Leiden University
- Occupation: Politician; jurist

Susanto Tirtoprodjo (3 March 1900 – 16 November 1969) was the acting Prime Minister of the Republic of Indonesia (part of the United States of Indonesia from 20 December 1949 to 16 January 1950 after being sworn in very rapidly alongside Mohammad Hatta when the Dutch recognised Indonesia's independence. He was also a member of the Investigating Committee for Preparatory Work for Independence (BPUPK) and served in several early Indonesian cabinets. He represented Indonesia in Paris and Holland and also served as the head of the National Institute of Legal Studies. and the Institute of National Legal Development which was tasked with drafting a new civil code before falling ill in 1964. He also served as the governor of the Lesser Sunda Islands

Political offices
Preceded by Mohammad Hatta	Prime Minister of Indonesia (acting); 20 December 1949 – 21 January 1950	Succeeded by Abdul Halim
