= Nurhayati =

Nurhayati may refer to:

- Nurhayati (born 1997), Indonesian singer and former member of JKT48
- Nurhayati Ali Assegaf (born 1963), Indonesian politician
