= Ulema National Awakening Party =

Ulema National Awakening Party Partai Kebangkitan Nasional Ulama
- Chairman: Choirul Anam
- Secretary-General: Idham Cholied
- Founded: 2000s
- Dissolved: 2022
- Split from: PKB
- Merged into: PKR
- Headquarters: Jakarta
- Ideology: Conservatism; Islamic democracy Indonesian nationalism
- Political position: Centre-right
- Ballot number: 34
- DPR seats: 0

Website

The Ulema National Awakening Party (Indonesian: Partai Kebangkitan Nasional Ulama) was an Islamist political party in Indonesia. The party's main voter base was members of traditionalist Muslim organisation Nahdlatul Ulama. PKNU was established by Indonesian ulemas seeking a new political vehicle to promote Islamic political values outside the National Awakening Party.

The only election that PKNU contested was in 2009, as the party failed to participate in subsequent elections due to failure to satisfy the increasingly rigorous KPU RI criteria.

Following years of electoral vacuum and continued resistance to unite with larger parties, PKNU leaders decided to merge the party with People's Sovereignty Party (Partai Kedaulatan Rakyat) in 2022.

== History ==
PKNU was founded by ulemas affiliated by Nahdlatul Ulama who were disillusioned by the organisation's "political vehicle", National Awakening Party (PKB). Some 17 ulemas, including future vice president Ma'ruf Amin and Abdullah Faqih of Langitan Pesantren, are the initiators of the new party. They concurred to appoint Abdullah Chudori as the party's first Executive Council chief.

PKNU contested the 2009 elections, but won only 1.5 percent of the vote, less than the 2.5 percent electoral threshold, meaning it was awarded no seats in the People's Representative Council.

PKNU failed to participate in the 2014 election, per the KPU RI resolution in early 2013 which deemed the party not qualified to participate. Due to this failure, the party experienced mass exodus as its members and leaders left the party in favour of PKB. At the same time, PKB invited PKNU members, along with New Indonesia National Sovereignty Party -- led by Yenny Wahid, Muslim activist and daughter of former president Abdurrahman Wahid -- to reconcile and "return home".

Instead of returning to PKB, PKNU decided to approach another major Islamic party United Development Party (PPP), with whom the party established a coalition in 2013. The coalition agreement enabled PKNU cadres to participate in 2014 elections by hopping in PPP party list. Party chairperson Choirul Anam clarified that despite the coalition arrangement, PKNU had not fully merged with PPP.

Following years of vacuum due to failure to participate in general elections, PKNU merged with People's Sovereignty Party (Partai Kedaulatan Rakyat), a newly established minor party, in 2022. Anam was appointed as the chairperson of the new party's Honorary Council.

== Regional strength ==
In the legislative election held on 9 April 2009, support for the PKNU was higher than the party's national average in the following provinces:

- Lampung: 1.5%
- Central Java: 1.8%
- East Java: 4.6%
- West Nusa Tenggara: 1.7%

== Notable members ==
- Alwi Shihab, Coordinating Minister of People's Welfare (2004-2005)
- Ma'ruf Amin, Vice President of Indonesia (2019-2024)
