= Nurhayati Ali Assegaf =

Indonesian politician

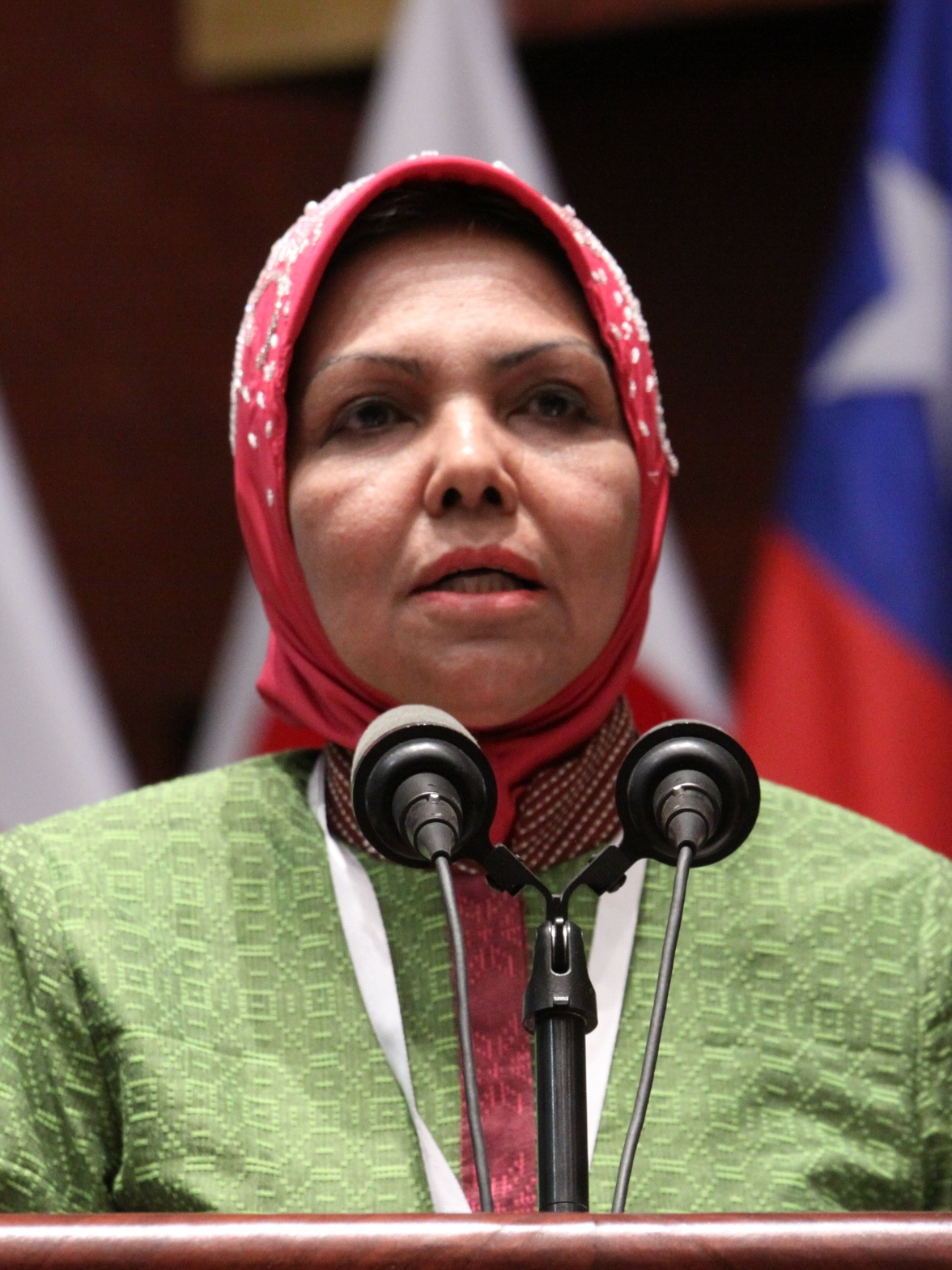
- Assegaf in 2015 at Asia Pacific Parliamentary Forum
- Born: July 17, 1963 (age 62); Solo
- Occupations: Deputy Chairperson of Central Board of Democratic Party (2013-2015); Chairperson of Democratic Party Faction, the House of Representatives of the Republic of Indonesia (2012-2014) Member of Commission I, DPR RI (2009-2014)

Nurhayati Ali Assegaf, M.Si., M.P. (born 17 July 1963, in Solo) is the Chairperson of Democratic Party Faction in the People's Representative Council (lower house) of the Republic of Indonesia and Deputy Chairperson of Democratic Party for 2013 - 2015. She used to be the Vice-Chairperson of the Committee for Inter-Parliamentary Cooperation. A member of the People's Representative Council since 2004, she was re-elected in 2009. During her first term (2004-2009) Dr. Assegaf was appointed Special Staff to the First Lady of the Republic of Indonesia. Alongside these duties, as a strong proponent of women’s empowerment and gender issues, she also hosted and directed the television programme “Women’s Perspective” on the Republic of Indonesia TV Channel (TVRI). Dr. Assegaf had been Managing Director of the Business and Financial Consultant (Assegaf & Partners Ltd., 1998-2004) and, before that, an Associate of Winarto Soemarto & Associates (1993-1998).

Her early activism in her university years and her strong engagement with political and social issues as well as international affairs moved Dr. Assegaf to become a patron and founder of a number of institutions and think-tanks dealing with issues pertaining to youth, women and children’s rights, democracy, and education. In 2003, she joined the Democratic Party, becoming active in the party’s organizational structure, including as Deputy Secretary-General and Chairperson of the Foreign Affairs Department.

== Education ==
- Phd in Social and Political Studies, Gajah Mada University, Yogyakarta, Indonesia
- Master's degree in American Studies, University of Indonesia, Jakarta
- Under-Graduate Degree in Human Resources Management, STIA Majapahit, Malang, Indonesia
- Diploma in Medical Faculty, Brawijaya University, Malang, Indonesia
- Diploma in Public Relations, Los Angeles City College
- Regular Course – KRA SSSVI National Resilience Institute (LEMHANAS), Indonesia
- Harvard Kennedy School Executive Education, Leaders in Development: Managing Change in a Dynamic World, USA

== National Parliament ==
In the course of her parliamentary activities since 2004, Dr. Assegaf has been involved in a number of Commissions in the People's Representative Council, notably Commission VI on Trade, Industry, Investment, Small and Medium-Scale Enterprises, State Enterprises, and National Standardization; and Commission I on Defense, Intelligence, Foreign Affairs, Communication and Information.

She is Chairperson of the Inter-Parliamentary Union (IPU- Indonesia) and of the Working Group on the Millennium Development Goals (MDGs), and Vice-Chairperson of the Committee for Inter-Parliamentary Cooperation. She also acts as Focal Point of the Indonesian House of Representatives for the UN Convention to Combat Desertification.

== Inter-Parliamentary Union ==
Since joining the Indonesian delegation to the IPU conferences, Dr. Assegaf has been active both as a participant and chairperson in the meetings and committees of the IPU, in particular as a member of its Executive Committee and its Sub-Committee on Finance. She is President of the IPU Coordinating Committee of Women Parliamentarians.

Dr. Assegaf headed the Indonesian Delegation to the 124th IPU Assembly and related meetings in Panama City, Panama, in 2011, and to the 123rd IPU Assembly and related meetings in Geneva, Switzerland.

Believing strongly in the need to develop the regional dimension of parliamentary cooperation, Dr. Assegaf has played an active part in regional forums such as the Asian Parliamentary Assembly (APA); the ASEAN Inter-Parliamentary Assembly (AIPA); the Forum of Asia-Pacific Parliamentarians for Education (FASPPED); and the Parliamentary Union of OIC Member States (PUIC).

== Asian Parliamentary Assembly (APA) ==
- Member of Indonesian delegation to the 5th APA Plenary Session, Damascus, Syria
- Proposer of the idea on the establishment of the Coordinating Meeting of APA Women Parliamentarians on the APA Executive Council Meeting in Jakarta, Indonesia
- Chairperson of Drafting Committee of Asian Parliamentary Assembly in Bandung, Indonesia
- Member of the Steering Committee and Member of Indonesian delegation to the 4th APA Plenary Session in Bandung, Indonesia
