= House of Representatives (Indonesia) =

Lower house of Indonesia's parliament

Coordinates: 6°12′37″S 106°48′00″E

House of Representatives Dewan Perwakilan Rakyat
- 2024–2029 Period

Type
- Type: Lower house of the People's Consultative Assembly Unicameral (1945–2004)

History
- Established: 29 August 1945; 81 years ago (as Central Indonesian National Committee); 15 February 1950; 76 years ago (as House of Representatives)
- Preceded by: Volksraad; Central Indonesian National Committee
- New session started: 1 October 2024

Leadership
- Speaker: Puan Maharani, PDI-P since 1 October 2019
- Deputy Speaker: Sufmi Dasco Ahmad, Gerindra since 1 October 2019
- Deputy Speaker: Saan Mustopa, NasDem since 1 October 2024
- Deputy Speaker: Sari Yuliati, Golkar since 27 January 2026
- Deputy Speaker: Cucun Ahmad Syamsurijal, PKB since 1 October 2024

Structure
- Seats: 580
- Political groups: Government (348) KIM: Golkar (102); Gerindra (86); PKB (68); PAN (48); Democratic (44); Confidence and supply (122) KIM+: NasDem (69); PKS (53); Check and balance (110): PDI-P (110)
- Length of term: Five years
- Authority: Passing laws and budgets (together with the President); oversight on executive branch

Elections
- Voting system: Party-list proportional representation
- First election: 29 September 1955
- Last election: 14 February 2024
- Next election: 2029

Meeting place
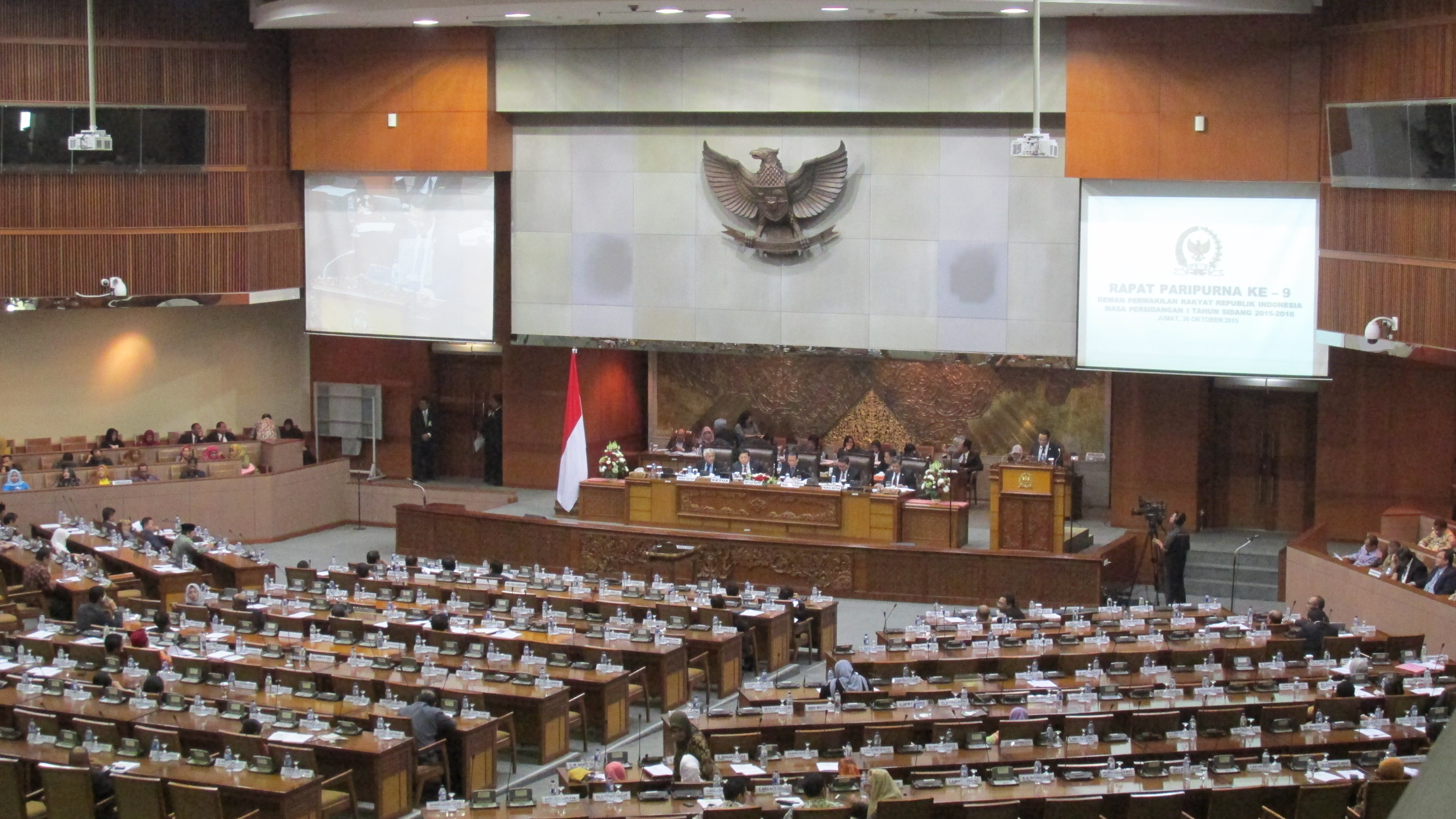
- Nusantara II Building, Parliamentary Complex; Jakarta, Indonesia

Website
- dpr.go.id

The House of Representatives of the Republic of Indonesia (DPR) (Note: Indonesian: Dewan Perwakilan Rakyat Republik Indonesia, Indonesian pronunciation: [ˌdewan pərwaˌkilan ˈraʔjat re'publik indo'nesija], lit. 'People's Representative Council of the Republic of Indonesia', abbr. DPR-RI or simply DPR, Indonesian: [deˈpeɛr]) is one of two elected chambers of the People's Consultative Assembly (MPR), the national legislature of Indonesia. It is considered the lower house, while the Regional Representative Council (DPD) serves as the upper house; while the Indonesian constitution does not explicitly mention the divide, the DPR enjoys more power, privilege, and prestige compared to the DPD.

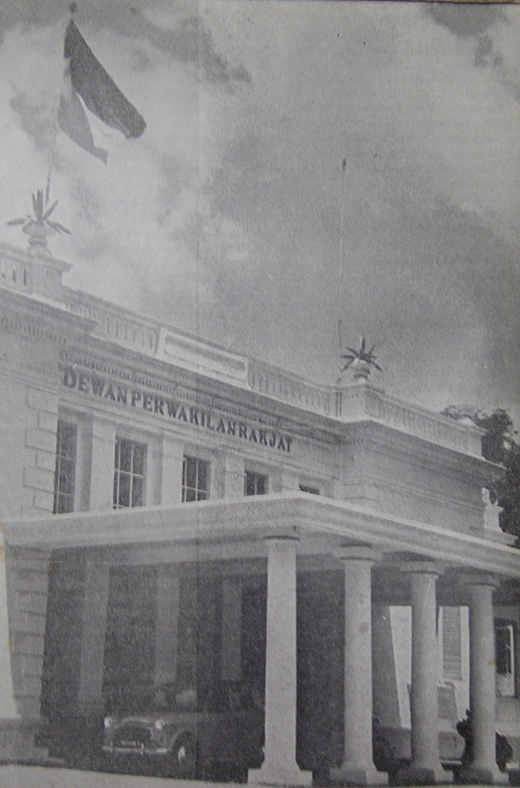
The original building in Central Jakarta where the legislative body of the Republic of Indonesia and the Republic of Indonesia, the House of Representatives (DPR), has met since 1950.

Members of the DPR are elected through a general election every five years. Currently, there are 580 members; an increase compared to 575 prior to the 2024 elections. Its members are called Members of Parliament (anggota dewan).

== History ==
=== Volksraad ===
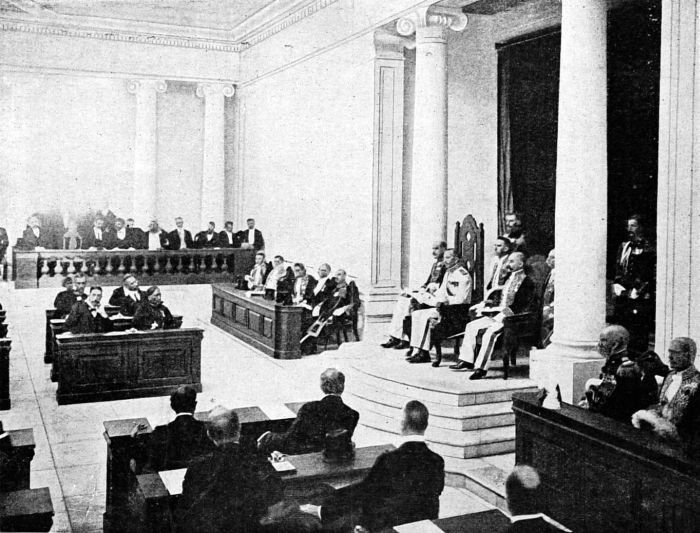
Dutch East Indies Governor-General Johan Paul van Limburg Stirum opens the first meeting of the Volksraad in 1918.

In 1915, members of the Indonesian nationalist organisation Budi Utomo and others toured the Netherlands to argue for the establishment of a legislature for the Dutch East Indies, and in December 1916 a bill was passed to establish a Volksraad (People's Council). It met for the first time in 1918. Ten of its nineteen members elected by local councils were Indonesians, as were five of the nineteen appointed members. However, it had only advisory powers, although the governor-general had to consult it on financial matters. The body grew in size to 60 members, half of who were elected by a total of 2,228 people.

In 1925, the Volksraad gained some legislative powers. It had to agree to the budget and internal legislation, and could sponsor laws of its own. However, it had no power to remove the governor general and remained nothing more than a gesture.

In 1940, after the German invasion of the Netherlands, and the fleeing of the Dutch government to exile in London, there was a motion calling for an inquiry into turning it into a quasi-legislature, but this was withdrawn after a negative response from the government. In July 1941, the Volksraad passed a motion calling for the creation of a militia made up of up to 6,000 Indonesians. In February 1942, the Japanese invasion began, and in May 1942 the Dutch formally dissolved the Volksraad. It was replaced by a council made up of heads of departments.

=== Japanese occupation ===
The Japanese invaded Dutch East Indies in 1942. By 1943, the tide had turned against them, and to encourage support for the war effort, the Japanese appointed Indonesian advisors (sanyo) to the administration and appointed Sukarno leader of a new Central Advisory Board (Chuo Sangi-kai) in Jakarta. In March 1945, the Japanese established the Investigating Committee for Preparatory Work for Independence (Badan Penyelidik Usaha Persiapan Kemerdekaan) or BPUPK, chaired by Radjiman Wediodiningrat, with Sukarno, Hatta and Thamrin among its members. This body drew up a constitution for an independent Indonesia over several weeks of meetings. At a session of the committee on 1 June 1945, Sukarno laid down the principles of Pancasila by which an Indonesia would be governed.

On 7 August, the day after the atomic bombing of Hiroshima, the Preparatory Committee for Indonesian Independence (Panitia Persiapan Kemerdekaan Indonesia) or PPKI was established. Sukarno was chairman, and Hatta vice-chairman. The two proclaimed the Independence of Indonesia on 17 August. On 18 August, the PPKI accepted the constitution drawn up by the BPUPK as the provisional Constitution of Indonesia and decided that during a six-month transition period, the new republic would be governed according to the constitution by a president, assisted by a National Committee, who would establish the legislature mandated by the constitution. The People's Consultative Assembly would then have six months to draw up a new constitution, leaving open the possibility that this would be an entirely new document free of the influence of the situation prevailing during the Second World War. Originally, under that constitution, the People's Consultative Assembly was to be the Indonesian version of the Supreme Soviet of the Soviet Union, with the House of Representatives acting as Presidium of the same, acting upon the MPR's general legislative work and other legislative actions not under its constitutional purview. The PPKI also named Sukarno as president and Hatta vice-president.

=== National Revolution ===
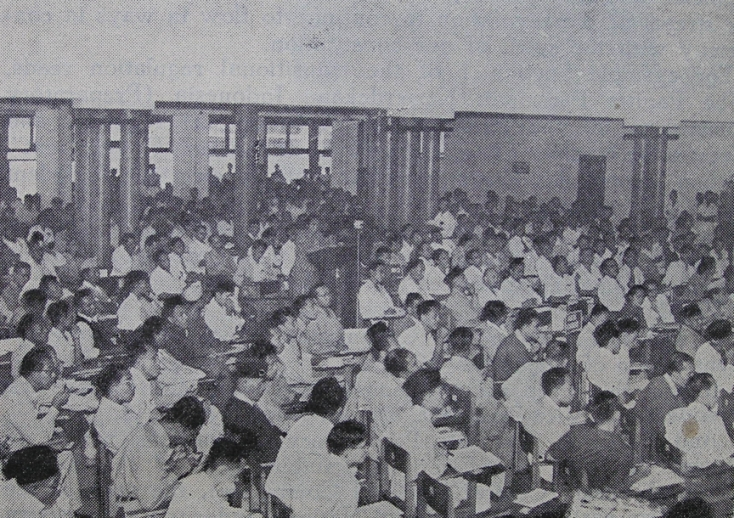
The historic plenary session of the KNIP in Malang, East Java to vote on Indonesia's official response to the Linggadjati Agreement

The Central Indonesian National Committee (Komite Nasional Indonesia Pusat) or KNIP was a body appointed to assist the president of the newly independent Indonesia, Sukarno, officially created on 29 August 1945 (today the current House of Representatives marks this as its official anniversary). It was originally planned to have a purely advisory function, but on 18 October, Vice-president Hatta issued Edict No.X transferring the powers the Constitution conferred on the People's Consultative Assembly and House of Representatives from the president to the KNIP. The day-to-day tasks of the KNIP would be carried out by a Working Committee whose first leaders were Sutan Sjahrir and Amir Sjarifuddin.

During the War of Independence, the entire KNIP was unable to meet regularly. Therefore, the KNIP acted as the upper house, the People's Consultative Assembly in the constitution, meeting only infrequently to discuss fundamental and pressing national issues, while the Working Committee acted as the day-to-day parliament fulfilling the duties of the House of Representatives during wartime.

=== Federal legislature ===
In January 1948, the Dutch authorities established the Provisional Federal Council for Indonesia (Voorlopige Federale Raad voor Indonesia) comprising Lieutenant Governor Hubertus van Mook and eight Indonesians chosen by him to represent the views of Indonesia. Two months later, the council made up of heads of departments that the Dutch had set up to replace the pre-war Volksraad officially became the Provisional Federal Government (Voorlopige Federale Regering). This body invited heads of the states making up the United States of Indonesia to send delegates to the Federal Conference in Bandung in May 1948. That month, leaders of states and other areas joined to establish the Federal Consultative Assembly (Bijeenkomst voor Federaal Overleg or BFO) to represent the federal regions.

Following the transfer of sovereignty to the United States of Indonesia (RIS), in December 1949, the state adopted a bicameral system, with a 150-member House of Representatives (DPR-RIS) and a Senate with two representatives from each of the 16 component areas of the RIS. Initially the House of Representatives had 50 MPs appointed from the Republic of Indonesia and 100 MPs coming from the other 15 component states of the RIS. The plan was for elections within a year. The KNIP and its Working Committee had its final sessions held before adjorning sine die on 15 December 1949 to agree to the Republic of Indonesia joining the RIS, and the planned 50 would transfer to the new RIS House of Representatives.

This House of Representatives had its opening session on 15 February 1950 at the former Sociëteit Concordia Building on Jalan Wahidin, Jakarta. Most of the sessions were held in this building, but it also met at other buildings, including the Hotel Des Indies. The DPR-RIS passed seven laws in its six months of existence, but was soon overtaken by events as the federal system collapsed as the individual states dissolved themselves into the unitary Republic of Indonesia. The House adjourned for the last time on 16 August the same year.

=== Liberal democracy ===
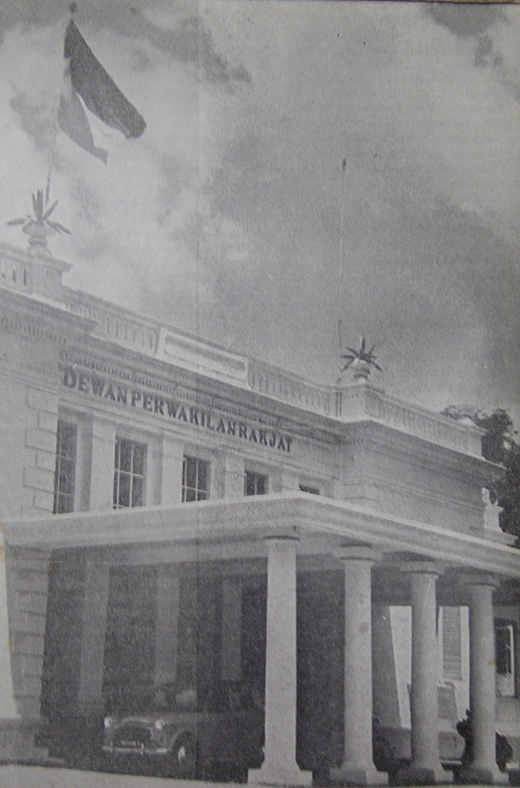
The original building in central Jakarta where legislatures of the United States of Indonesia and the Republic of Indonesia the House of Representatives (DPR) met from 1950

Given that the Republic of Indonesia did not want the RIS parliament to become the legislature of the unitary republic, in May 1950, Hatta and representatives from the federal states agreed to establish a new legislature comprising the 150 members of the RIS House of Representatives, 46 members of the KNIP Working Committee, 13 from the Republic of Indonesia Supreme Advisory Council, and 32 RIS senators, making 241 members. On 17 August 1950, the RIS was formally dissolved and the unitary Republic of Indonesia came into being.

The Provisional House of Representatives met for the first time on 16 August 1950. By then there had been minor changes to the agreed composition as three RIS senators had refused to take their seats and 21 representatives from the State of Pasundan were replaced by 19 members appointed by the Republic. Of the 236 members, only 204 took their oaths of office on 20 August, and only 170 voted in the election of the speaker, which was narrowly won by Sartono of the Indonesian National Party (PNI). Masyumi was the largest parliamentary party with 49 seats. Its main rival, the PNI had 36 seats and no other party had more than 17.

In 1952, the DPR demanded a reorganisation of the Ministry of Defense and the dismissal of the Army leadership in response to military opposition to troop reductions. This led to the '17 October 1952' incident with large-scale demonstrations at the presidential palace by soldiers and civilians demanding the DPR be dissolved. The crowd dispersed after Sukarno addressed it.

Despite the election bill being introduced in 1951, it was not passed until 1953 and elections were finally held in 1955. The results surprised everybody. The Indonesian Socialist Party (PSI) did worse than expected, as did Masyumi, while the Indonesian Communist Party (PKI) did better than predicted. Following the election, the PNI and Masyumi had 57 seats each, the Nahdlatul Ulama had 45 and the PKI 39. There were now 28 parties in parliament, compared with 20 before the election. Only 63 of the 257 pre-election members of parliament still maintain their seats, but there were 15 women members compared with eight before. The new parliament met on 26 March 1956, forming the first elected House of Representatives (1956–1959).

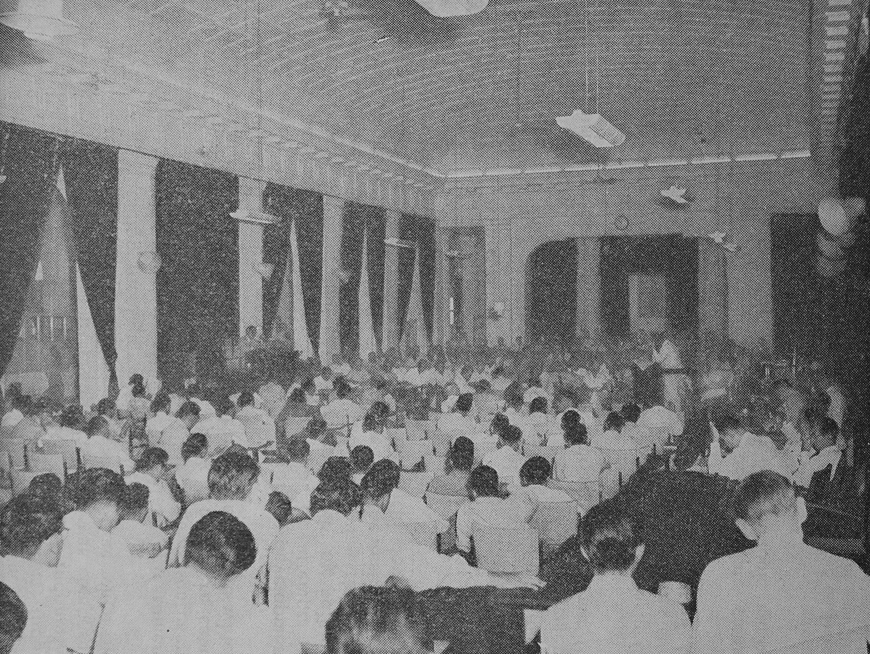
The Indonesian parliament in session in the 1950s

Over the next few years, public dissatisfaction with the political parties grew. In 1957, Sukarno announced his concept of a national unity cabinet and a National Council made up of functional groups to advise the cabinet. This council was established in May 1957. On 5 July 1959, Sukarno issued a decree, which as well as reviving the provisional 1945 Constitution, dissolved parliament.

The new DPR took office on 22 July 1959. It accepted the president's decree by acclamation and said it was ready to work as stipulated by the 1945 Constitution. However, in March 1960 it unexpectedly rejected the government's budget. Sukarno then dissolved it as it was seen as no longer fulfilling the president's hopes that it would work with him in the spirit of the 1945 Constitution, Guided Democracy and the Political manifesto (Manipol, referring to Sukarno's 1959 Independence Day speech). The DPR session adjourned on 24 June sine die.

=== Guided Democracy ===
Sukarno then used this difference of opinion with the legislature as justification for the establishment of a Mutual Assistance House of Representatives (Dewan Perwakilan Rakyat Gotong Royong, DPR-GR). The membership was no longer based on the results of the 1955 election, but was determined by the president, who could appoint and dismiss members at will, as well as its speaker. Political opponents were sidelined, and some who opposed the establishment of the DPR-GR refused to take their seats. As Masyumi and the Indonesian Socialist Party did not agree with Sukarno, they were given no seats, meaning there was no longer a parliamentary opposition. A number of representatives from various functional groups including the National Armed Forces were also appointed to the House. As of mid-1962, there were 281 MPs; 130 from 10 political parties, 150 sectoral representatives and 1 representative from West Irian.

The responsibilities and duties of the parliament were dramatically curtailed as it was reduced to helping the government implement its policies. In 1960 it produced only 9 laws, compared with 87 in 1958 and 29 in 1959. It became little more than a rubber stamp for Sukarno's policies. For example, it passed a law allowing volunteers to be sent to participate in the Confrontation with Malaysia.

=== New Order ===
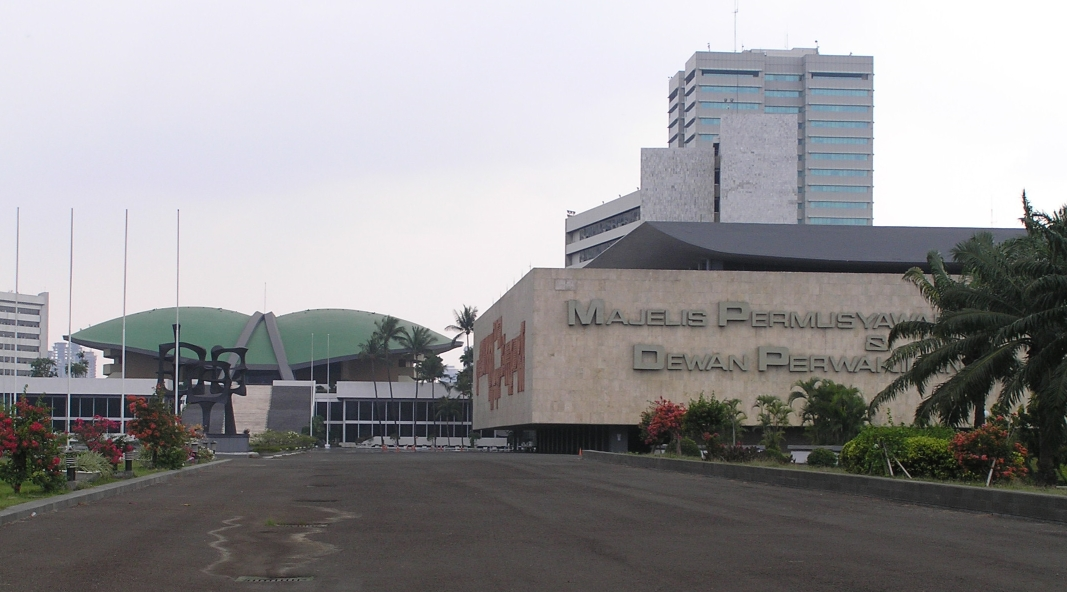
The building complex in Jakarta where Indonesia's House of Representatives holds its plenary sessions

Following the coup attempt of the 30 September Movement in 1965, which was officially blamed on the Indonesian Communist Party (PKI), the DPR-GR was purged of PKI members – 57 communist members were removed from their seats. On 14 November parliament resumed without the PKI MPs, including deputy speaker M.H. Lukman. In 1969, the government passed an election law that set the membership of the DPR at 360 elected and 100 appointed MPs. The number of representatives from the military increased to 75 - including police officers. Elections were finally held in 1971, having been delayed to allow preparations to ensure a victory for the government's Golkar organisation.

Following the election, the words Gotong Royong were removed and the body became the Dewan Perwakilan Rakyat again. In 1973 the remaining political parties were reduced to two, the United Development Party and the Indonesian Democratic Party. For the remainder of the New Order, Golkar won absolute majorities at every elections, while the parliament did not produce a single law on its own initiative, its role being reduced to passing laws proposed by the government.

=== Reform era ===
In May 1998, President Suharto stepped down, leading to Indonesia's first free elections since 1955 taking place the following year. Of the 500 seats, 462 were elected, while 38 seats were reserved for the military/police. In the 2004 elections, all 550 seats were elected. In the 2009 elections the number of seats was increased to 560, For the 2019 elections this rose to 575, and for the 2024 elections this rose again to 580. These are elected in 84 constituencies, each electing between 3 and 10 members depending on their electorates. Each of the 38 provinces comprises a whole number of constituencies, with the majority of provinces having a single constituency. There are now no appointed military officers in the legislature.

== Powers ==
As is common in countries with presidential system, the President does not hold the power to suspend or dissolve the DPR. On the other hand, the legislature does not have full control over the President or the government in whole.

=== The Three Functions ===
Under Article 20A of the amended 1945 Constitution, the DPR has three main functions: legislative, budgeting, and oversight. The legislative function of the DPR consists of:

- Drafting the National Legislation Program (Program Legislasi Nasional, commonly known as Prolegnas), which is the official list of priority draft laws and bills;
- Drafting and holding deliberations on the Rancangan Undang-Undang or the bills of law;
- Receiving the bills of law proposed by the DPD, especially on the subjects of regional autonomy; Central-Regional governance relations; creations, proliferations, and mergers of regional territories; management of regional resources; and Central-Regional fiscal balance;
- Holding deliberations on the bills of law proposed either by the President or by the DPD;
- Jointly passing the bills of law into Law with the President;
- Passing or rejecting the Government Regulation in-lieu-of Law (Peraturan Pemerintah Pengganti Undang-Undang or Perppu) enacted by the President. If passed, the Perppu is enshrined as Law.

The budgeting function of the DPR consists of:

- Approving and passing into Law the National Budget (Anggaran Pendapatan dan Belanja Negara or APBN) proposed by the President;
- Taking into considerations the opinions of the DPD, especially on the subjects of taxes, education, and religious affairs;
- Following up the state financial accountability reports made by the Audit Board of Indonesia;
- Approving the transfers of any state assets and properties which are considered impactful on the people and the national finance.

The oversight function of the DPR consists of:

- Overseeing the execution of the Laws, National Budget, and government policies;
- Holding deliberations and following up on the oversights exercised by the DPD, especially on the subjects of regional autonomy; Central-Regional governance relations; creations, proliferations, and mergers of regional territories; management of regional resources; Central-Regional fiscal balance; execution of the National Budget; and on the subjects of taxes, education, and religious affairs.

=== The Rights ===
The 1945 Constitution guarantees several rights of the DPR. Especially in regard to the oversight function, they include the right to question the government regarding any government policy considered important, strategic, and impactful (Hak Interpelasi); the right to investigate allegations of breach of the Laws by government policy (Hak Angket); and the right to express opinions (Hak Menyatakan Pendapat) on any government policy, on extraordinary domestic or foreign events, on the follow up of the exercise of the rights to question and to investigate government policy, as well as on the initial impeachment process of the President and/or the Vice President.

The MPs themselves are vested with rights in order to execute their duties. They include:

- Right to propose drafts and bills of Laws;
- Right to question the government and its officials;
- Right to express opinions and offer suggestions;
- Right to elect and be elected into parliamentary duties;
- Right to defend oneself on alleged violations of parliamentary code of ethics;
- Right of immunity from prosecution due to any statements, questions, and opinions made for the purpose of parliamentary duties, except in violation of parliamentary code of ethics and code of conducts;
- Right to be assigned certain stately protocols;
- Right to financial and administrative benefits;
- Right to oversee the execution of the National Budget, as well as the interests of the people and their constituency;
- Right to propose and promote programs for the benefit of their constituency;
- Right to promote and inform the creation of a new Law.

== Current composition ==
The House of Representatives has 580 members resulting from the 2024 legislative election. The representatives come from 8 political parties factions.

Political party	Parliamentary group	Seats	Political affiliation/coalition	Chair of the parliamentary group
Indonesian Democratic Party of Struggle	PDI-P Faction	110	Coalition supply	Utut Adianto (Central Java VII); Minority floor leader
Golkar Party	Golkar Faction	102	Presidential coalition	Muhammad Sarmuji (East Java VI)
Gerindra Party	Gerindra Faction	86	Presidential coalition	Budi Djiwandono (East Kalimantan); Majority floor leader
NasDem Party	NasDem Faction	69	Coalition supply	Viktor Laiskodat (East Nusa Tenggara II)
National Awakening Party	PKB Faction	68	Presidential coalition	Jazilul Fawaid (East Java X)
Prosperous Justice Party	PKS Faction	53	Coalition supply	Abdul Kharis Almasyhari (Central Java V)
National Mandate Party	PAN Faction	48	Presidential coalition	Putri Zulkifli Hasan (Lampung I)
Democratic	Democratic Faction	44	Presidential coalition	Edhie Baskoro Yudhoyono (East Java VII)
Total		580		

== Historical composition ==
=== 1955 ===
PKI / Acoma / Murba / PSI / PB / Permai / PNI / PRN / Baperki / GIR-W / GIR-H / Grinda / GPPS / PRI / Parkindo / PKRI / Others / PD / P3RI / IPKI / NU / PERTI / PSII / Masyumi
1955	57 / 1 / 2 / 5 / 2 / 1 / 57 / 2 / 1 / 1 / 1 / 1 / 2 / 2 / 8 / 6 / 5 / 1 / 2 / 4 / 45 / 4 / 8 / 57

=== 1971-1997 ===
PNI / PDI / PSII / Parkindo / Katolik / PPP / Parmusi / NU / PERTI / Golkar/ABRI
1971	20 / 10 / 7 / 3 / 24 / 58 / 2 / 336
1977	29 / 99 / 332
1982	24 / 94 / 342
1987	40 / 61 / 399
1992	56 / 62 / 382
1997	11 / 89 / 400

=== Since 1999 ===
PNI-M / PNI-FM / PNI-MM / PDI-P / PDI / PDKB / PKDI / PBI / PKB / PNU / TNI/Polri / PKU / PKPI / PKR / PAN / IPKI / PBB / PPP / PP / PK / PSII / Golkar / PPIM
1999	1 / 1 / 1 / 124 / 2 / 1 / 1 / 1 / 51 / 5 / 38 / 1 / 4 / 1 / 34 / 1 / 13 / 58 / 1 / 7 / 1 / 120 / 1

PNI-M / PDI-P / NasDem / PKB / Pelopor / PPDI / PKPI / PDS / Hanura / PAN / Demokrat / Others / PPP / PK/PKS / Golkar / PBR / Gerindra
2004	1 / 109 / 52 / 3 / 1 / 1 / 13 / 53 / 55 / 58 / 45 / 128 / 14 / 2
2009	94 / 17 / 28 / 49 / 148 / 38 / 57 / 106 / 26
2014	109 / 35 / 16 / 47 / 49 / 61 / 39 / 40 / 91 / 73
2019	128 / 59 / 58 / 44 / 54 / 19 / 50 / 85 / 78
2024	110 / 69 / 68 / 48 / 44 / 53 / 102 / 86

== Parliamentary groups (Factions) ==
In the House of Representatives of the Republic of Indonesia a faction or fraction (Indonesian: Fraksi, has similarities to Fraktion in Germany) is a parliamentary group formed by members of the house based on their political party affiliation. Each political party that wins seats in the DPR forms its own faction, while smaller parties that do not meet the minimum membership requirement may combine to create a joint faction.

Factions coordinate legislative work, determine members’ assignments in commissions and bodies, and shape party stances on legislation and government oversight. The number and composition of factions vary after each general election, depending on the political parties that pass the parliamentary threshold and win seats in the DPR.

== Structure ==
=== Leadership ===
The DPR leadership consist of a Speaker and four Deputy Speakers. The most recent Speaker's election was conducted under provisions of Law No. 13/2019 (Amendment) of the Law No. 17/2014 on the MPR, DPR, DPRD, and DPRD; popularly known as UU MD3. The Speaker's seat is reserved to the political party with largest number of representation in the chamber, and the four Deputy Speakership are reserved to the second, third, fourth, and fifth largest political parties respectively.

- Speaker: Puan Maharani (PDI-P/Central Java V)
- First Deputy Speaker: Sari Yuliati (Golkar/West Nusa Tenggara II)
- Second Deputy Speaker: Sufmi Dasco Ahmad (Gerindra/Banten III)
- Third Deputy Speaker: Saan Mustopa (NasDem/West Java VII)
- Fourth Deputy Speaker: Cucun Ahmad Syamsurijal (PKB/West Java II)

Each Deputy Speakers oversee the operation of the following Council organs:

- First Deputy Speaker is responsible for politics and national security, overseeing the First Commission, Second Commission, Third Commission, Committee for Inter-Parliamentary Cooperation, and Legislation Committee.
- Second Deputy Speaker is responsible for finance and economics, overseeing the Eleventh Commission, Budget Committee, and Public Finance Accountability Committee.
- Third Deputy Speaker is responsible for industries and public development, overseeing the Fourth Commission, Fifth Commission, Sixth Commission, and Seventh Commission.
- Fourth Deputy Speaker is responsible for public welfare, overseeing the Eighth Commission, Ninth Commission, Committee of the Household, and Committee for Ethics.

=== Commissions ===
Most, but not all, of the business of the House are conducted through the commissions, akin to the standing committee of the United States Congress. Currently, there are thirteen commissions.

- First Commission: defense, foreign affairs, information, communications, and intelligence.
  - Chair: Utut Adianto (PDI-P/Central Java VII)
- Second Commission: home affairs, local autonomy, public service, bureaucratic reform, elections, land affairs, and agrarian reform.
  - Chair: Rifqinizamy Karsayuda (NasDem/South Kalimantan I)
- Third Commission: law, human rights, and national security.
  - Chair: Habiburokhman (Gerindra/Jakarta I)
- Fourth Commission: agriculture, environmental affairs, forestry, and maritime affairs.
  - Chair: Titiek Suharto (Gerindra/Yogyakarta)
- Fifth Commission: infrastructure, transportation, disadvantaged areas and transmigration, meteorology, climatology, geophysics, and search and rescue.
  - Chair: Lasarus (PDI-P/West Kalimantan II)
- Sixth Commission: industry, trade, SMEs, cooperatives, SOEs, investment, and standards.
  - Chair: Anggia Ermarini (PKB/East Java VI)
- Seventh Commission: energy, research, and technology.
  - Chair: Saleh Partaonan Daulay (PAN/North Sumatra II)
- Eighth Commission: religious affairs, social affairs, disaster management, women's empowerment, and child protection.
  - Chair: Marwan Dasopang (PKB/North Sumatra II)
- Ninth Commission: health, labor, and the demography.
  - Chair: Felly Estelita Runtuwene (NasDem/North Sulawesi)
- Tenth Commission: education, sports, tourism, and creative economy.
  - Chair: Hetifah Sjaifudian (Golkar/East Kalimantan)
- Eleventh Commission: finance, national development planning, and banking.
  - Chair: Mukhamad Misbakhun (Golkar/East Java II)
- Twelfth Commission:
  - Chair: Bambang Patijaya (Golkar/Bangka Belitung Islands)
- Thirteenth Commission:
  - Chair: Willy Aditya (NasDem/East Java XI)

=== Other organs ===
- Legislation Committee: responsible for drafting bills and preparing the National Legislative Program (Prolegnas).
  - Chair: Bob Hasan (Gerindra/Lampung II)
- Budget Committee: responsible for drafting the national budget.
  - Chair: Said Abdullah (PDI-P/East Java XI)
- Household Committee: responsible for internal affairs of the council and overseeing the Secretariat-General.
  - Chair: Rizki Natakusumah (Demokrat/Banten I)
- Committee for Inter-Parliamentary Cooperation: responsible for conducting external relations of the council.
  - Chair : Mardani Ali Sera (PKS/Jakarta I)
- State Financial Accountability Committee
  - Chair: Andreas Eddy Susetyo (PDI-P/East Java V)
- People's Aspiration Committee
  - Chair: Ahmad Heryawan (PKS/West Java II)
- Ethics Committee: responsible for investigating Council members who violate the ethics policy and code of conduct.
  - Chair: Nazaruddin Dek Gam (PAN/Aceh I)

== The Opposition ==
The Opposition is a term used to describe political parties represented in the DPR but not in the cabinet, which organize themselves as an opposition faction. However, it is not a formal term, and these parties consider themselves 'critical partners of the government'.

During the 2019 election, the incumbent president Joko Widodo ('Jokowi') led a majority coalition of ten parties that had supported him during the previous 2014 election. Opposing him was Prabowo Subianto, who led a minority coalition of five parties. Following the election, the Jokowi Administration invited Gerindra and PAN into the governing coalition, appointing Subianto as Defence Minister. Near the end of Jokowi's presidency, Demokrat was also invited to join the government, leaving PKS as the only opposition party to serve in that role for a full 10 years.

=== The current status ===
Under the current Subianto Administration, there are virtually no opposition parties in the parliament. The opposition coalition effectively went into dormancy.

Some observers thought that PKS would remain in opposition, a role they had fully filled during the 10 years of Joko Widodo's presidency. After the 2024 general election, the party joined KIM Plus and declared support for Prabowo. However, PKS did not join the government. Similarly, NasDem also declared support for Prabowo's administration but did not join the government. Both PKS and NasDem offered confidence and supply to the current governing coalition.

In this predicament, many hoped that PDI-P would act as the main opposition to Prabowo's administration. PDI-P entered the 2024 presidential election as a fierce opponent against the KIM coalition, and they did not immediately declare support after Prabowo won the election and took office. However, after Prabowo's inauguration, PDI-P cadre Ahmad Basarah stated that PDI-P did not adhere to the opposition system and initially insisted they were neutral. Nevertheless, PDI-P chairwoman Megawati is considered to have a close personal relationship with Prabowo and rumors circulated regarding a secret coalition between them. In recent developments, Megawati announced her party's stance to support the government while taking a check and balance stance from within, effectively ending any legislative opposition.

== Criticism ==
The DPR has been the subject of frequent public criticism due to perceived high levels of fraud and corruption.

== Buildings of the legislature ==
Throughout its history, the legislature has convened in multiple buildings.

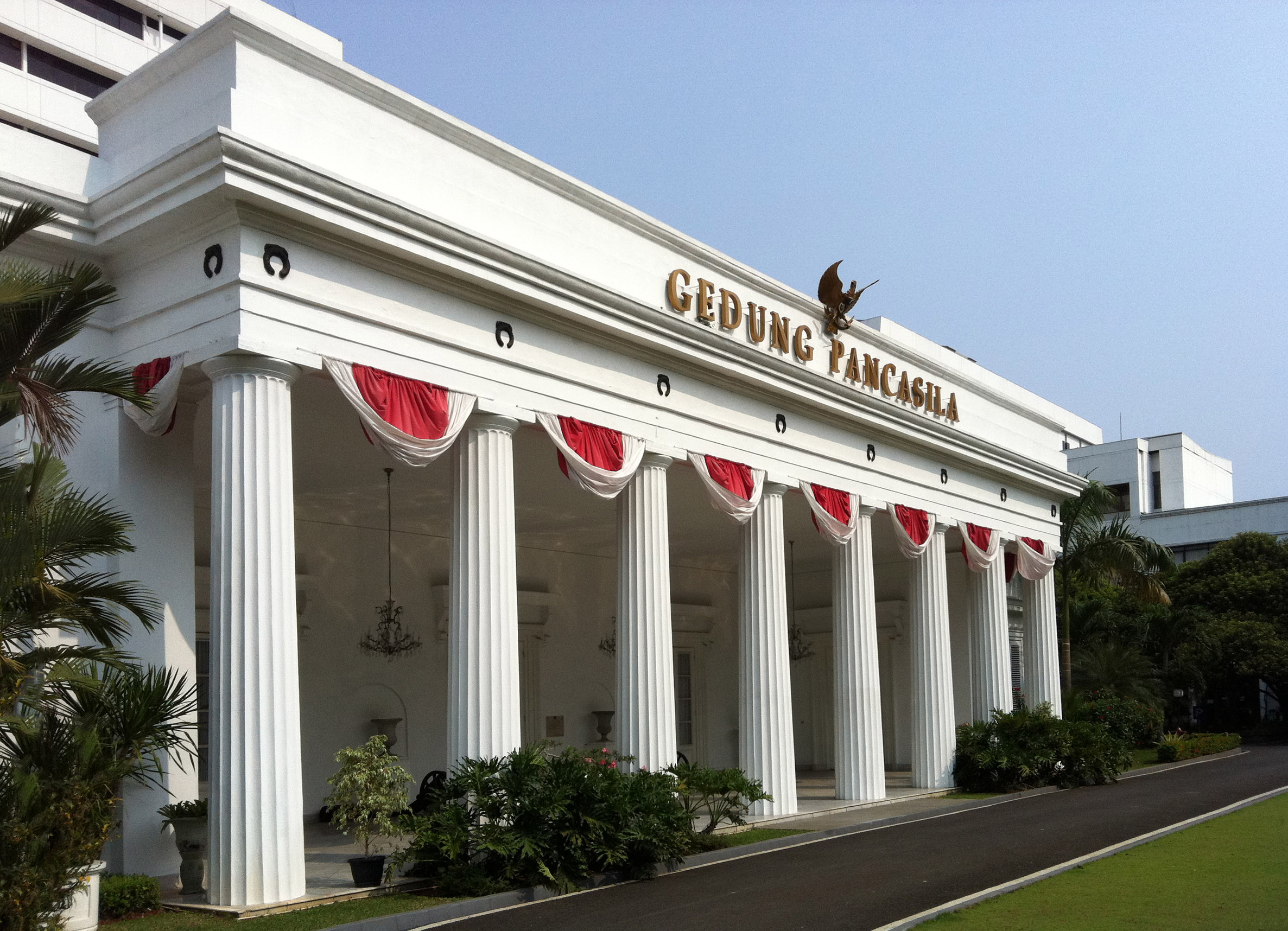
Present-day Gedung Pancasila (previously known as Volksraad Building)

=== Volksraad ===
The Volksraad convened in the Volksraadgebouw (Building of the Volksraad) since 1918 until 1942 during Japanese occupation when it was dissolved. Today the building is known as Gedung Pancasila, located within the Foreign Ministry complex, and is still used for hosting important state events.

=== Central Indonesian National Committee ===
In August 1945, the KNIP was established to assist the President in the early days of Indonesian independence. Soon after, KNIP was granted legislative powers and would function as a legislature until a democratically elected national legislature can be formed. Meanwhile, the presidential system was replaced by parliamentary system, and Sutan Syahrir was appointed as the first prime minister of Indonesia. Due to the unstable situation during those days, the KNIP was unable to convene in single, permanent place.

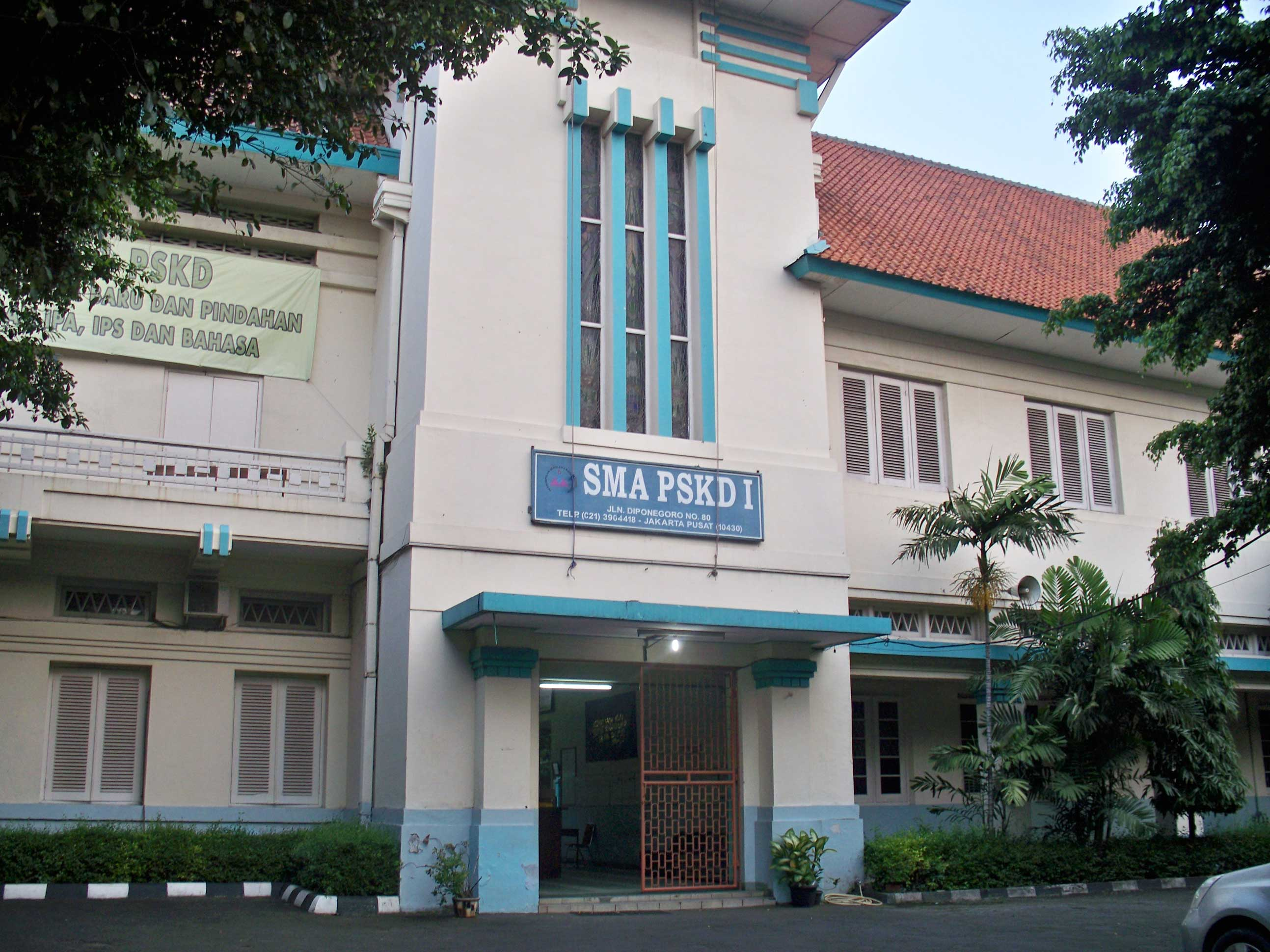
PSKD 1 Senior High School, site of the third meeting of the KNIP

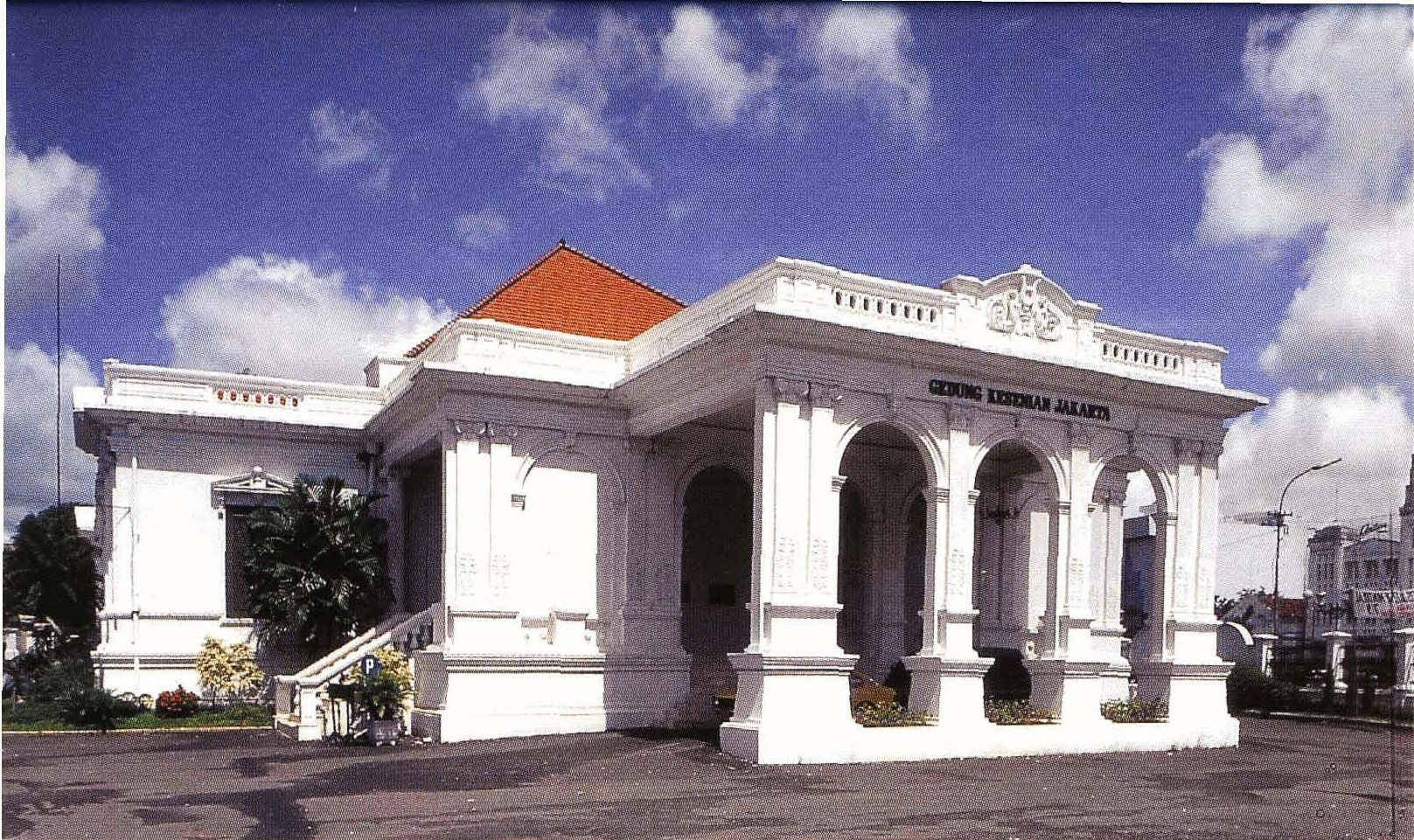
Gedung Kesenian Jakarta (Jakarta Art Building)

The first meeting of the KNIP following its inauguration was held on 29 August in Schouwburg Weltevreden, today known as Gedung Kesenian Jakarta (Jakarta Art Building). Due to lack of available working space, the secretariat was run from the defunct Jawa Hokokai headquarters close to Lapangan Banteng. Meanwhile, second meeting of the KNIP was held on 16 and 17 October in old Binnenhof Hotel in Kramat Raya street, Jakarta. The secretariat was also moved, this time to a building in Cilacap street, now occupied by a Marriott hotel. Third meeting of the KNIP was held in a building in Prince Diponegoro street, now known as PSKD 1 Senior High School, situated right across the Centraal Burgerlijke Ziekenhuis (which now constitutes part of the Cipto Mangunkusumo Central Hospital).

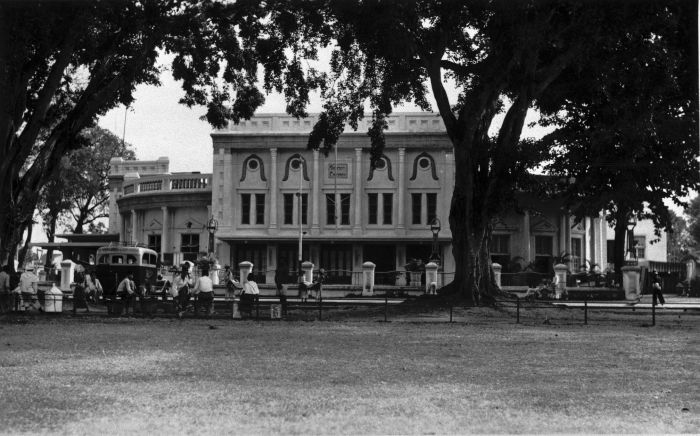
Societeit Concordia Building in Malang, East Java

Fourth meeting of the KNIP was held not in Jakarta, but in Surakarta in Central Java. It was held in Gedung Republik Indonesia, from 28 February until 3 March. The Working Committee (the permanent standing committee of the KNIP) and the secretariat later moved to Hotel van Laar in Purworejo, provided by the regent of Purworejo. Fifth meeting of the KNIP was held on 25 February until 3 March 1946 in Societeit Concordia Building in Malang, East Java. Following the fifth meeting, the Working Committee and the secretariat again moved to Yogyakarta, temporarily occupying an Indonesian Red Cross building, before later moved to Loge Theosofie Building (part of Gedung Dewan Perwakilan Rakyat Daerah Yogyakarta) in Malioboro, occupying it until 1950. Few years later, the sixth meeting of the KNIP was held on 6 until 15 December 1949 in Sitihinggil Keraton (part of the Yogyakarta Kraton).

=== Federal legislature ===
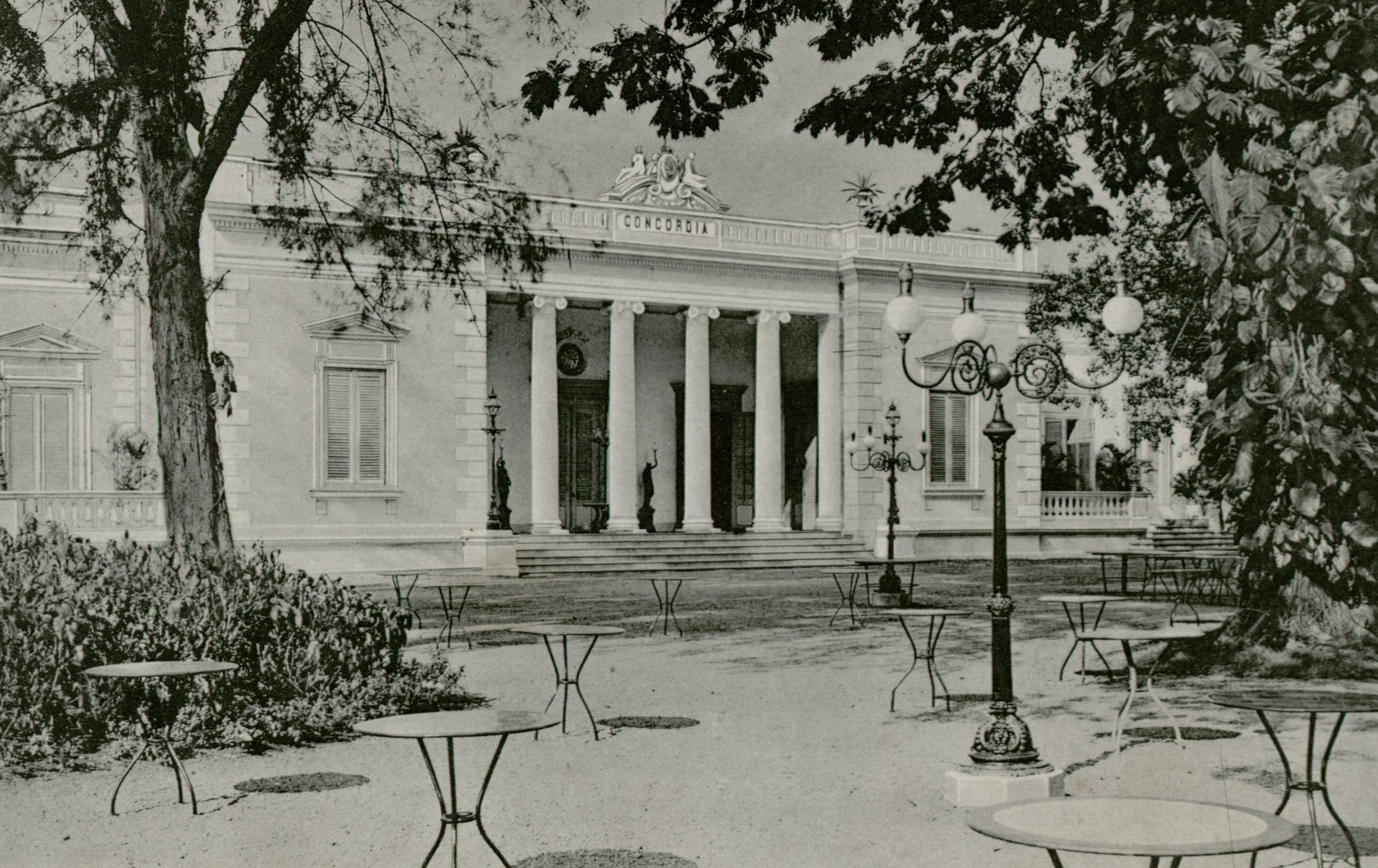
Societeit Concordia Building in Jakarta

Following the agreement reached during the 1949 Round Table Conference, a federal constitution was drafted for Indonesia, and thus KNIP was dissolved and replaced by the DPR-RIS. The Parliament was now able to settle down, although the venues might move. Established along with it was the Federal Senate, which served as an upper house, separate from the DPR-RIS. This parliament was inaugurated on 16 February 1950 in Societeit Concordia Building in Jakarta, now located within the Finance Ministry complex (not to be confused with Societeit Concordia Building in Bandung, now known as Gedung Merdeka). Following the inauguration, meetings were held instead in the upper floor of Hotel Des Indes. The hotel was later demolished in 1971 and replaced by Duta Merlin Shopping Center on its site.

=== Liberal democracy legislature ===
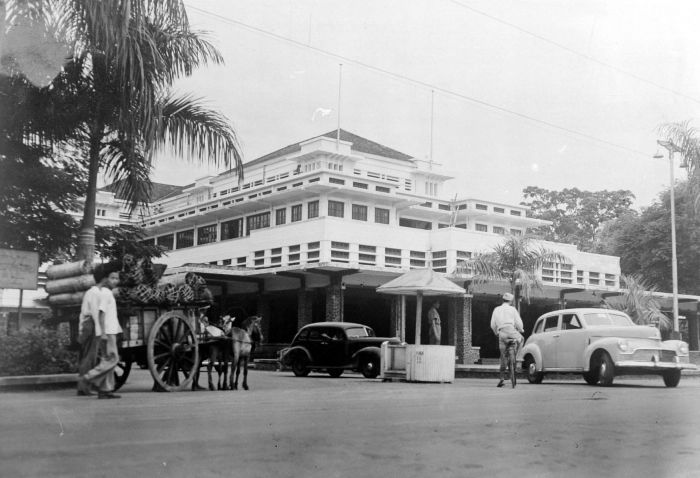
Hotel Des Indes in Jakarta

After the federal system collapsed and Indonesia returned to its unitary form in 1950, a provisional constitution established a provisional parliament (Dewan Perwakilan Rakyat Sementara/DPRS), as well as a constitutional assembly (Konstituante) for drafting a new, permanent constitution for Indonesia. The DPRS convened in Jakarta, while the Konstituante convened in Societeit Concordia Building in Bandung.

The DPRS was finally replaced by a proper DPR after September 1955 election was held, followed shortly with the December 1955 election for electing members of the Konstituante.

=== Guided Democracy legislature ===
Following years of political instability, as well as the Konstituante's failure to draft a new constitution, in 1959 President Sukarno assumed executive powers and ordered to return to the 1945 Constitution, dismantling the parliamentary system of governance that had run since KNIP was granted legislative powers in 1945. Through executive orders and decisions, the provisional People's Consultative Assembly (Majelis Permusyawaratan Rakyat Sementara/MPRS), the national legislature of Indonesia as prescribed by the 1945 Constitution, was finally established alongside various other constitutional bodies.

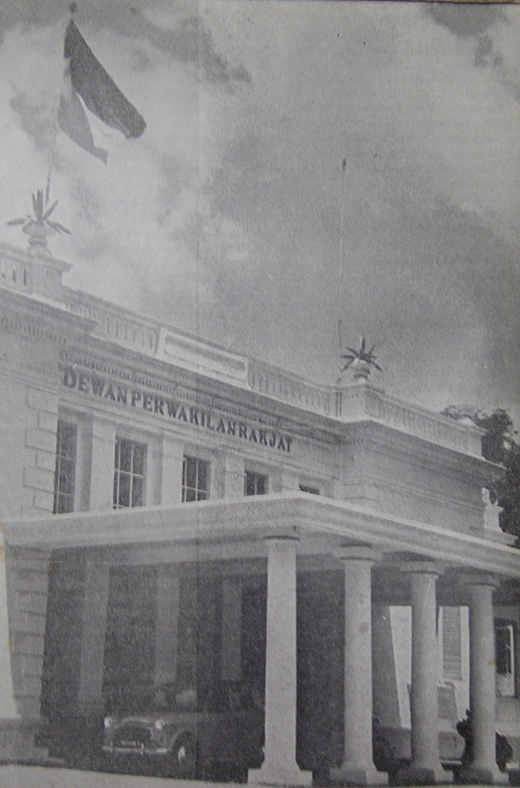
Old DPR Building

The DPR based on 1955 election was later dissolved in 1960, and replaced with DPR-GR (GR stands for Gotong Royong), whose members were appointed by the President. The DPR-GR first used the Societeit Concordia Building in Jakarta to convene and then moved to Gedung Dewan Perwakilan Rakyat near Lapangan Banteng, while the MPRS convened in Gedung Merdeka in Bandung. Because most members of the MPRS were residents of Jakarta, a branch secretariat of the MPRS was established in Jakarta and occupied Stannia Building on Cik Ditiro street.

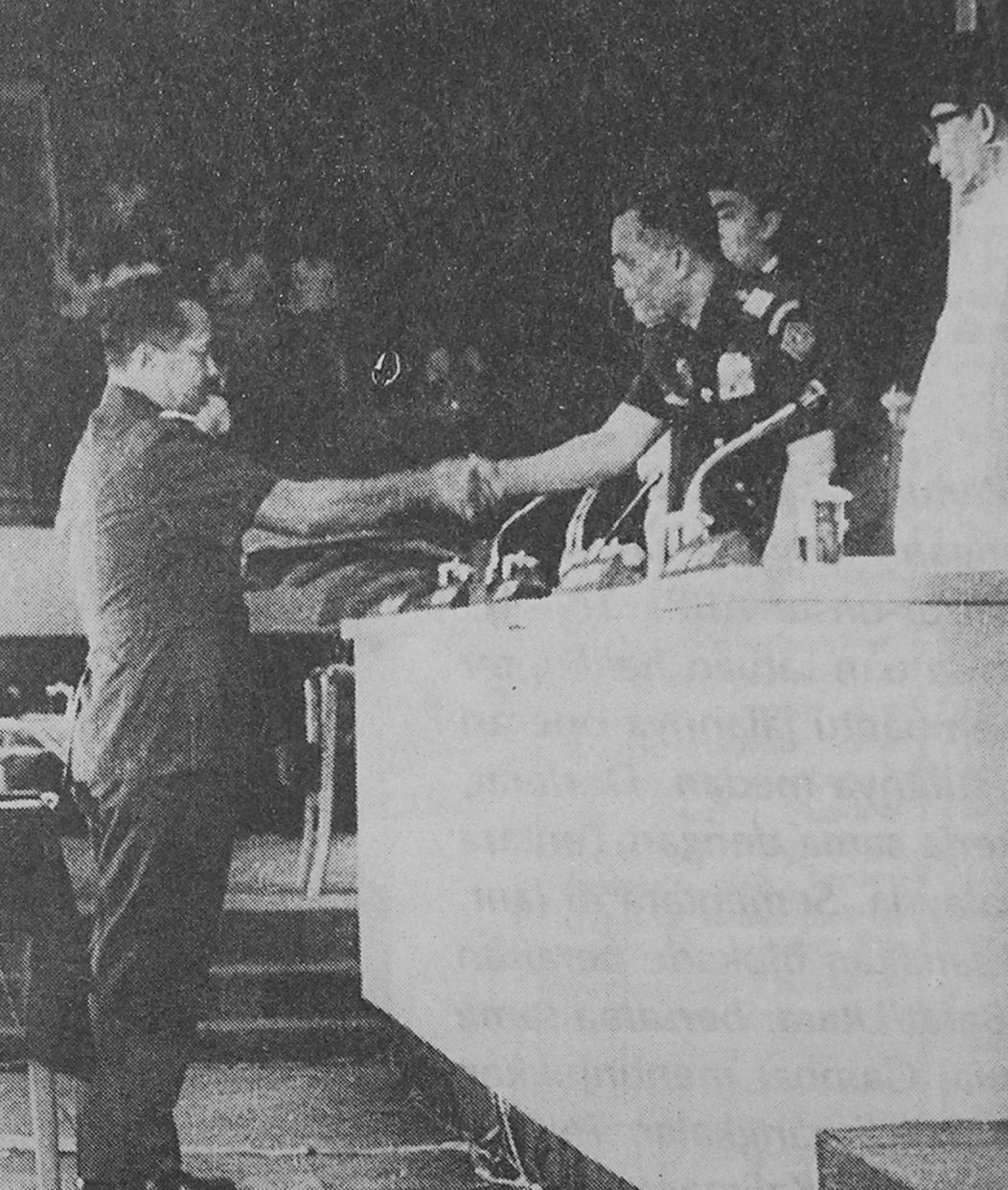
MPRS chairman Abdul Haris Nasution congratulating General Soeharto on his appointment as acting president, 12 March 1967, in the aftermath of the 1967 MPRS Special Session, situated in Istora Senayan, Jakarta.

In 1964 DPR-GR moved to convene in a temporary building within Senayan Sport Complex while the DPR Building went under renovation. This temporary building previously served as the headquarter for 1962 Asian Games construction and development office (Komando Urusan Pembangunan Asian Games/KUPAG). Events following the 30 September Movement in 1965, however, moved the renovation process to a halt. The DPR-GR was forced to use the basketball court building previously used in 1964 Asian Games. The 1966 MPRS General Session and 1967 MPRS Special Session was held in the Gedung Istana Olah Raga (Istora).

=== New Order legislature ===
After the 1962 Asian Games, President Sukarno ordered the construction of a building complex next to Senayan Sport Complex, to be used as a political venues for a "Conference of the New Emerging Forces" (CONEFO) to rival the United Nations, and international games to be held next door as GANEFO to rival the Olympics. The chief architect for this project was Soejoedi Wirjoatmodjo, a graduate of Technische Universität Berlin and head of the Department of Architecture in Bandung Institute of Technology.

The constructions was halted following President Sukarno's fall from power, and the project later resumed under Suharto presidency, when it was officially promulgated with Ampera Cabinet Presidium Decision No. 79/U/Kep/11/1966, dated 9 November 1966 that the old CONEFO political venues project were to be repurposed for the national legislature.

The construction proceeded gradually; Main Conference Building completed in March 1968, Secretariat Building in March 1978, Auditorium Building in September 1982, and Banquet Building in February 1983.

The MPR/DPR Complex in Senayan, Jakarta remains the seat of Indonesia's legislature to this day.

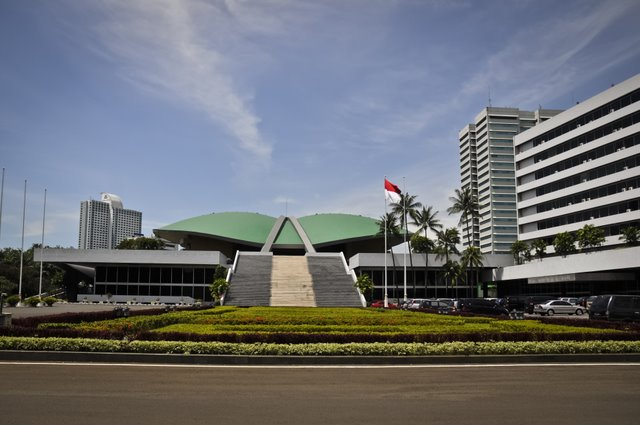
MPR-DPR-DPD Complex

=== Reformasi legislature ===
With the fall of President Soeharto and his New Order regime, a wave of political and social reform appeared in Indonesia, primarily in the form of four amendments of the 1945 Constitutions. A new chamber of the legislature, Dewan Perwakilan Daerah (Regional Representative Council), was established and occupied the same site as MPR and DPR.

During Widodo Administration, a plan to move the national capital to Kalimantan was announced. The legislatures are planned to be moved there alongside many other central government bodies.

== See also ==
- Inter-Parliamentary Union
