= People's Sovereignty Party =

Political party in Indonesia

People's Sovereignty Party Partai Kedaulatan Rakyat
- Abbreviation: PKR
- Chairman: Tuntas Subagyo
- Secretary-General: Sigit Prawoso
- Founded: 28 October 2021; 4 years ago
- Headquarters: Cilincing, Jakarta
- Ideology: Pancasila; Secularism; Pancasila democracy (id)
- National affiliation: Advanced Indonesia Coalition
- DPR seats: 0 / 580
- DPRD I seats: 0 / 2,372
- DPRD II seats: 0 / 17,510

Website
- partaikedaulatanrakyat.com

The People's Sovereignty Party (Partai Kedaulatan Rakyat, PKR) is a minor political party in Indonesia. The party was founded on 28 October 2021 by Sukoharjo activist and local organisation chief Tuntas Subagyo, who serves as the party chairperson. An unrelated party by the same name existed in the 1950s and had representation in the Provisional House of Representatives.

The party is the incarnation of Surakarta-based public organisation Tikus Pithi Hanata Baris, which is best known as the sponsor of Bagyo Wahyono, the independent candidate who challenged Gibran Rakabuming Raka in the 2020 Surakarta mayoral election. The party advertises themselves as a clean slate as no national figures participated in the party's founding.

In June 2022, leaders of the dormant Ulema National Awakening Party (PKNU) decided to merge with PKR, significantly strengthening the party in the run-up to the 2024 election. However, the KPU deemed the party not qualified to participate in the elections, and subsequent efforts to appeal the rejection to the General Election Organiser Honorary Council (DKPP) is ongoing.

== Party organisation ==
- Chairperson: Tuntas Subagyo
- Secretary General: Sigit Prawoso
- Deputy secretary general for internal affairs: Maman Lesmana
- Deputy secretary general for general affairs: Susiloadji
- Deputy secretary general for governance affairs: Budi Suprayogi
- Treasurer: Bambang Wicaksono Imam Suwongso
- Deputy treasurer for internal affairs: Erni Setyowati
- Deputy treasurer for party programmes: Dianna Fatmawati
