= Mukhamad Misbakhun =

Indonesian politician

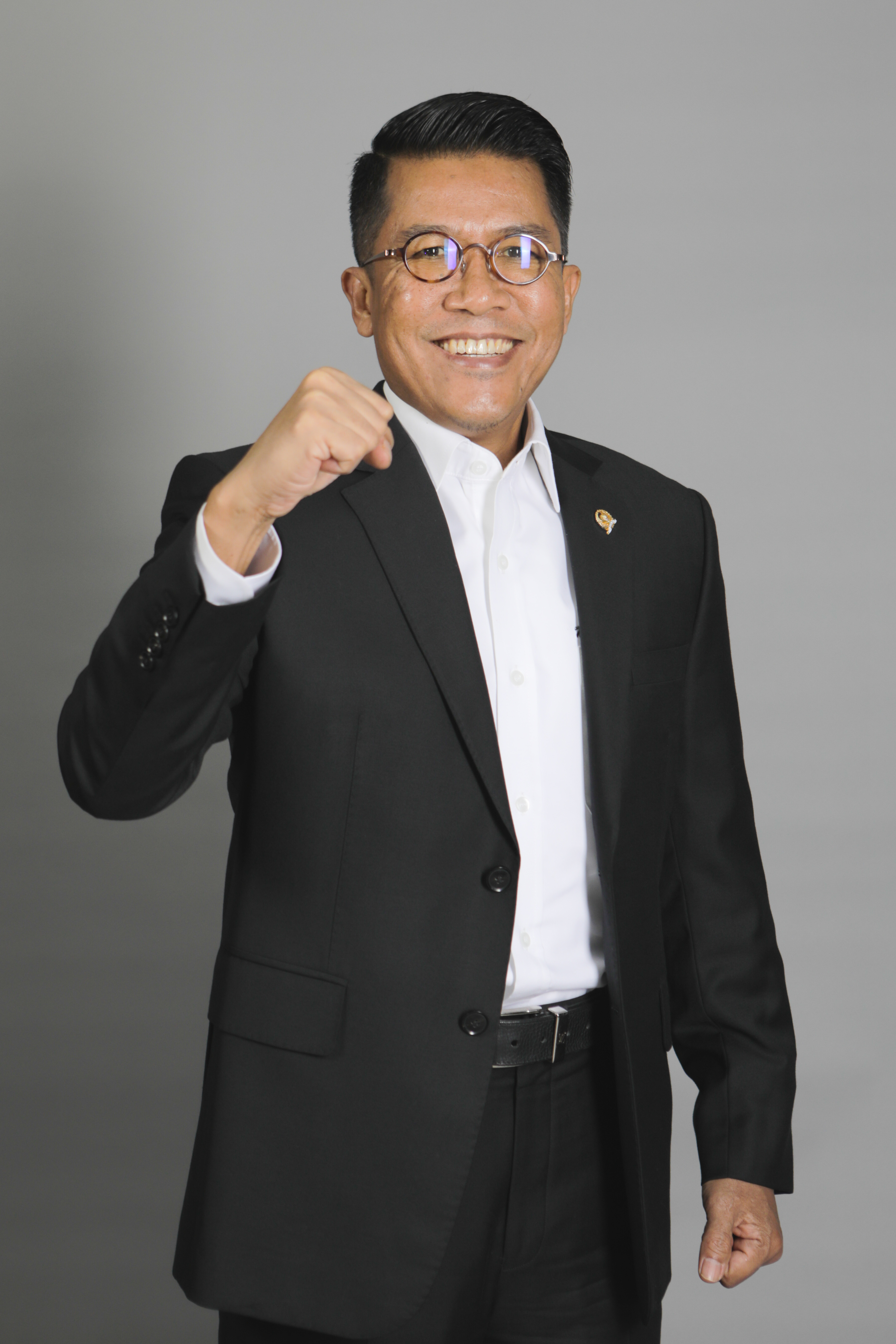
Mukhamad Misbakhun

H. Mukhamad Misbakhun, SE is an Indonesian businessman and politician from the Golkar party. Misbakhun elected to the People's Representative Council (DPR-RI) of the Republic of Indonesia in the 2009 legislative election for a term from 2009 to 2014 from the constituency of East Java II which includes Probolinggo, Pasuruan, city and town of Pasuruan Prolobilinggo from the Prosperous Justice Party. For a member of Parliament known Misbakhun very vocal against the Bank Century bailout case.

He was reelected for a second term in the 2014 legislative election, a third term in 2019, and a fourth term in the 2024 election with 98,736 votes.
