= Roem–Van Roijen Agreement =

1949 agreement between the Netherlands and Indonesia

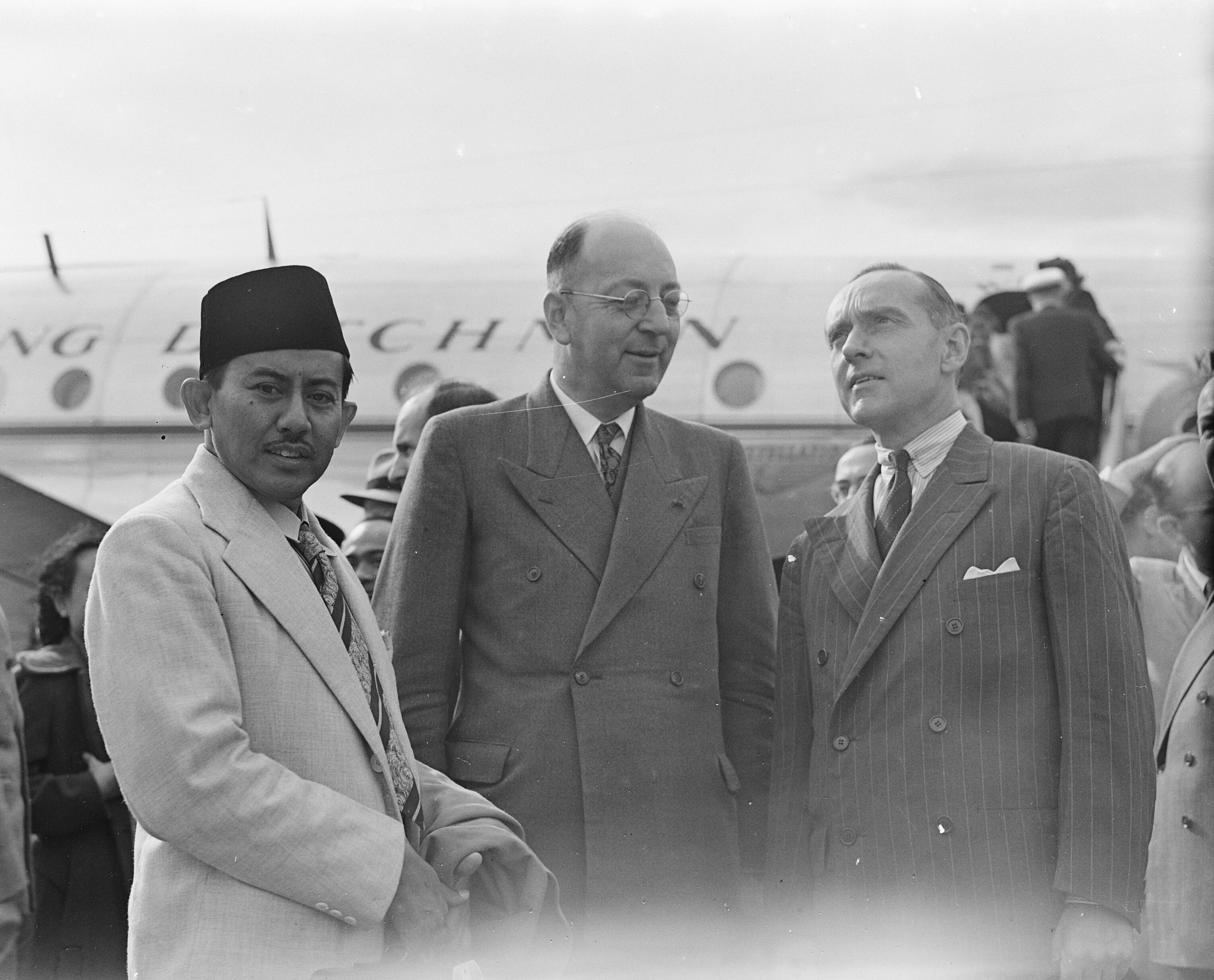
- Mohammad Roem (left) and Dr. Jan Herman van Roijen (right)
- Signed: 7 May 1949
- Location: Des Indes Hotel, Jakarta

The Roem–Van Roijen Agreement also known as the Roem-Royen Agreement was an agreement made between Indonesian republicans and the Netherlands on 7 May 1949 at the Des Indes Hotel. The name was derived between the two principal negotiators at the meeting; Mohammad Roem and Jan Herman van Roijen. The purpose of the meeting was to iron out outstanding issues prior to Indonesian independence which was to be granted at the Round Table Conference at The Hague later that same year.

== Background ==
On 19 December 1948, the Dutch made a final effort to gain control of the areas of their former colony of Indonesia, which had declared independence in 1945, that were still under the control of republican forces, by launching a "police action" known as Operation Kraai. Despite the military success of this operation, in which Dutch forces overcame Indonesian fighters and recaptured the whole of Java, including the Indonesian republican capital, Yogyakarta, there was worldwide condemnation, including from the United Nations (UN).

On 31 December, the Dutch agreed to a ceasefire requested by the UN. The United States subsequently put pressure on the Dutch to negotiate with the Indonesian side, including issuing a threat to withhold post-war financial aid. The Dutch agreed. In January 1949, the United Nations Security Council called for the release of the Indonesian leaders captured during the police action and for the Dutch to transfer sovereignty to Indonesia by 1 July 1950. In the face of this pressure the Dutch conceded defeat, and insisted on preliminary discussions with the Indonesian republican government.

== Discussions ==
Negotiations between the two sides began on 14 April, but reached deadlock after a week, with Dutch delegation leader Jan Herman van Roijen demanding a cessation of guerrilla warfare and agreement to attend the Round Table Conference by the Indonesians before the republican leadership would be allowed to return to Yogyakarta. The head of the Indonesian republican delegation, Mohammad Roem, rejected these demands, and said that the republican leadership must be returned to the capital first. The United States then put pressure on the Indonesian side to accept the Dutch terms, which it did fearing the loss of US support if it refused to do so. One member of the Indonesian delegation, Mohammad Natsir resigned in protest, but the two sides reached agreement on 7 May.

The main points of agreement were:

- Indonesian armed forces to cease all guerrilla activities
- The Indonesian Republican government's consent to attend the Round Table Conference
- Restoration of the Indonesian Republican government in Yogyakarta
- Dutch troops to cease all military operations and free all prisoners of war captured since 17 December 1948
- The Dutch to refrain from establishing any more federal states in the territory of the future United States of Indonesia

== Aftermath ==
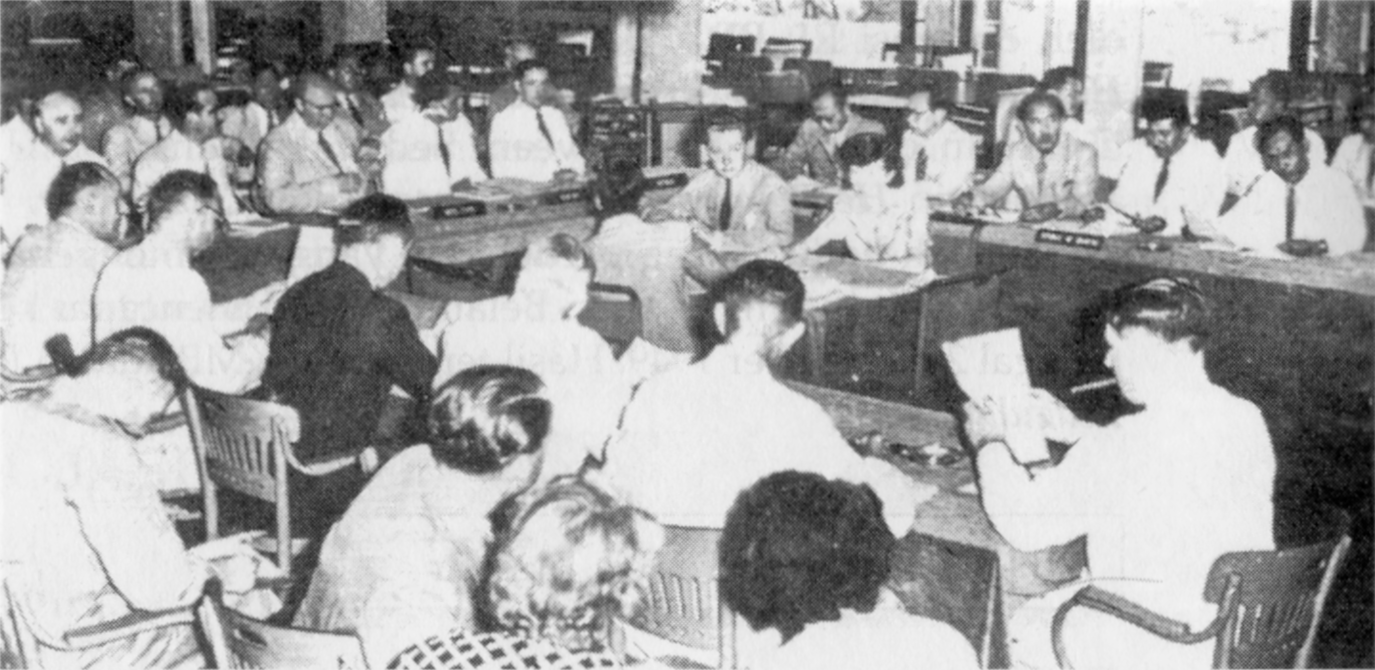
Roem–Van Roijen Agreement

In essence, the Dutch had obtained the concessions they sought from the Indonesian side at the time of the deadlock. The release of captured prisoners went ahead, but the Dutch classified people detained after 10 May as criminals, who were therefore not eligible for release. On 18 June, the Emergency Government of the Republic of Indonesia, which had assumed the governmental role following the Dutch attack, ordered republic troops to halt military action, and the final Dutch forces left the Yogyakarta region on 30 June.

On 6 July, republican leaders Sukarno and Hatta returned to the capital. The following week, they resumed the role of government and the cabinet met. In July and August, Indonesian republicans held a series of meetings with the Federal Consultative Assembly, representing the states established in areas controlled by the Dutch, to agree on the form of the independent United States of Indonesia (RIS). The final transfer of sovereignty to the RIS was agreed at the Round Table Conference held at the Hague from 23 August to 2 November 1949.
