= M. Rifqinizamy Karsayuda =

Indonesian politician (born 1982)

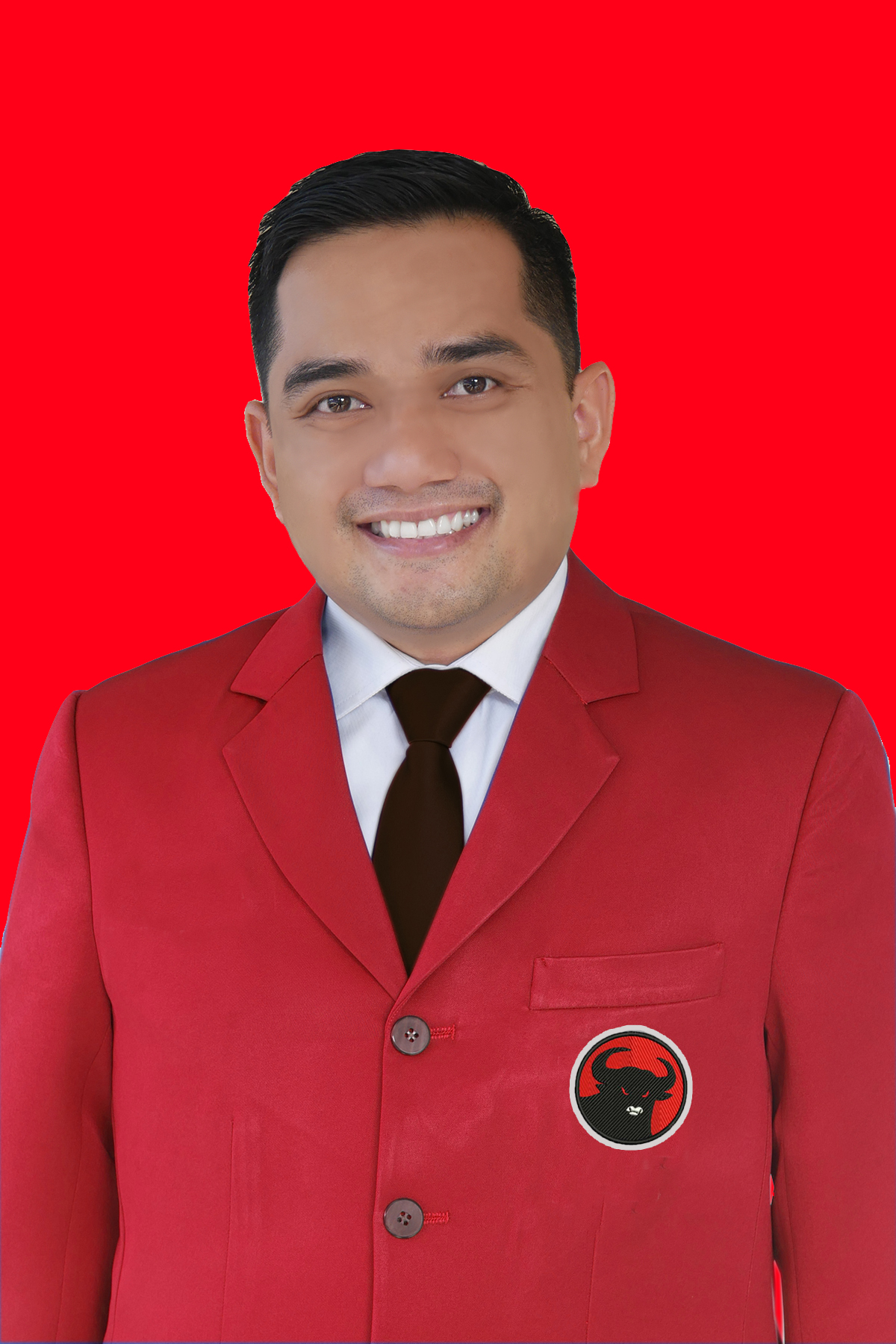
- M. Rifqinizamy Karsayuda in 2018

Member of the House of Representatives
- Incumbent
- Assumed office 1 October 2024
- Constituency: South Kalimantan I
- In office 1 October 2019 – 23 August 2023
- Succeeded by: Rosiyati Thamrin
- Constituency: South Kalimantan I

Personal details
- Born: 6 November 1982 (age 43)
- Party: NasDem Party (since 2023)

Muhammad Rifqinizamy Karsayuda (born 6 November 1982) is an Indonesian politician. He has been a member of the House of Representatives since 2024, having previously served from 2019 to 2023. He has served as chairman of the Second Commission of the House of Representatives since 2024.
