= Mohammad Roem =

Indonesian politician and diplomat (1908–1983)

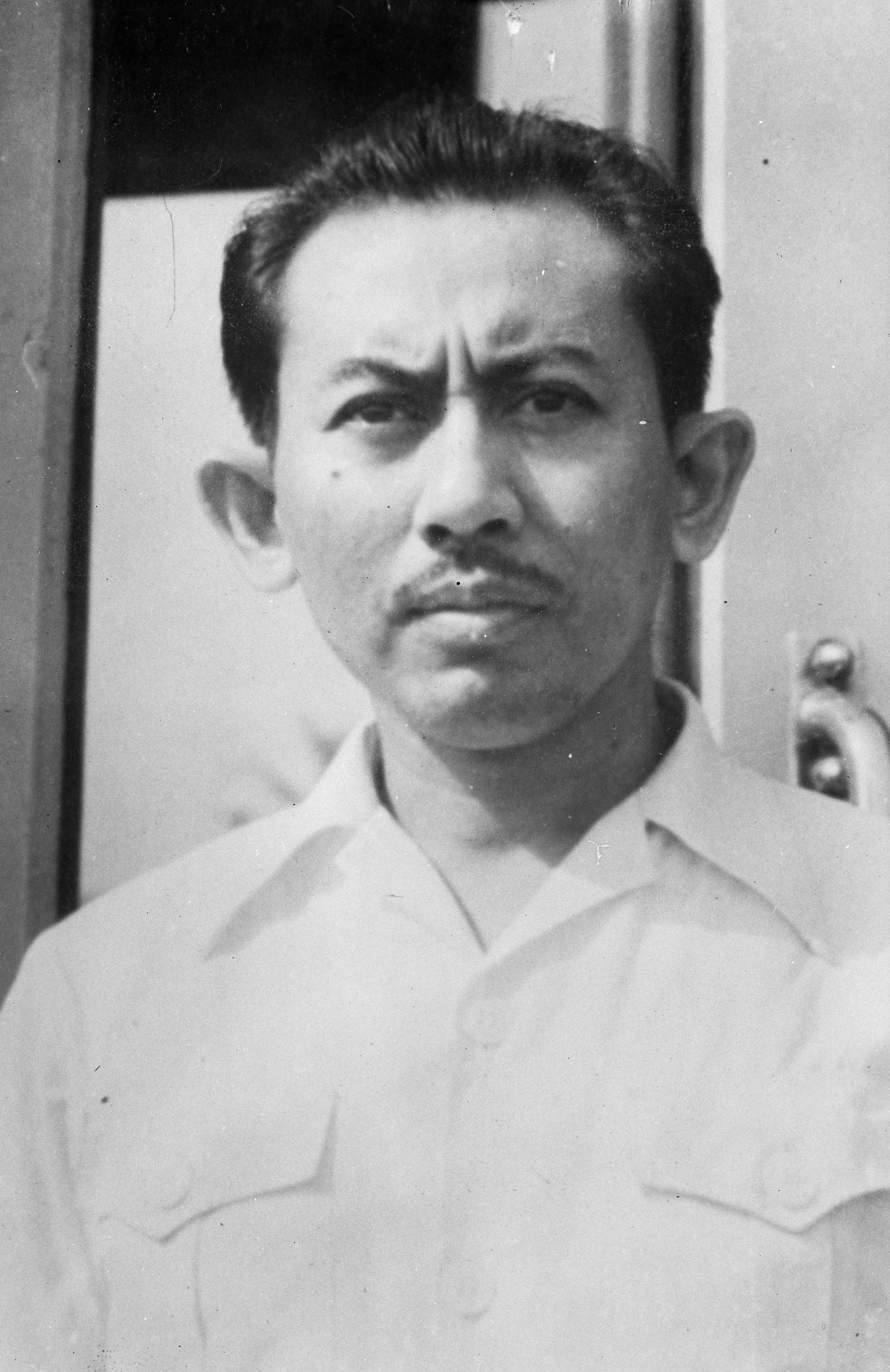
- Roem in 1947

Deputy Prime Minister of Indonesia
- In office 24 March 1956 – 9 January 1957
- Prime Minister: Ali Sastroamidjojo
- Preceded by: Djanoe Ismadi; Harsono Tjokroaminoto
- Succeeded by: Idham Chalid

Minister of Home Affairs
- In office 3 April 1952 – 30 July 1953
- Prime Minister: Wilopo
- Preceded by: Iskaq Tjokroadisurjo
- Succeeded by: Hazairin
- In office 11 November 1947 – 23 January 1948
- Prime Minister: Amir Sjarifuddin
- Preceded by: Wondoamiseno
- Succeeded by: Soekiman Wirjosandjojo
- In office 2 October 1946 – 26 June 1947
- Prime Minister: Sutan Sjahrir
- Preceded by: Sudarsono
- Succeeded by: Wondoamiseno

Minister of Foreign Affairs
- In office 6 September 1950 – 20 March 1951
- Prime Minister: Mohammad Natsir
- Preceded by: Mohammad Hatta
- Succeeded by: Achmad Soebardjo

Minister of State
- In office 20 December 1949 – 15 August 1950
- Prime Minister: Mohammad Hatta

Personal details
- Born: 16 May 1908 Parakan, Temanggung, Kedu Residency, Dutch East Indies
- Died: 24 September 1983 (aged 75) Jakarta, Indonesia
- Party: Masyumi (1945–1960)
- Education: Rechts Hogeschool (Mr.)
- Occupation: Politician; diplomat

Mohammad Roem (EYD: Mohammad Rum; 16 May 1908 – 24 September 1983) was an Indonesian politician and diplomat. He served in various positions during his career in government, including as Minister of Home Affairs, Minister of Foreign Affairs, and Deputy Prime Minister of Indonesia. He played a central role in negotiating the Roem–Van Roijen Agreement during the Indonesian National Revolution (1945–1949), which laid the groundwork for the Dutch-Indonesian Round Table Conference wherein the Dutch finally recognized the sovereignty of Indonesia.

Born into a Javanese family, Roem studied law at the Rechts Hogeschool in Batavia (now Jakarta), during which time he had become politically active in the nationalist movement. After graduating, he worked as a lawyer during the Japanese occupation period (1942–1945). Following the proclamation of independence in 1945, Roem joined the newly formed Republican government where he emerged as an able diplomat and became the Republic's principal negotiator with the Dutch. After the handover of sovereignty in 1949, Roem remained active in politics and the Masyumi Party. Opposed to President Sukarno's Guided Democracy, he was arrested and jailed in 1961. Following his release in 1966, after Sukarno fell from power, he was elected chairman of the Parmusi Party (Masyumi's successor). However, he was prevented from taking office by the new regime. He devoted most of his remaining years to studying and writing. He died in 1983.

== Early life ==
Roem was born in Parakan, Temanggung, Central Java, on May 16, 1908. His father's name was Dulkarnaen Djojosasmito, and his mother's name was Siti Tarbijah. He moved to Pekalongan because Parakan was hit by an outbreak of infectious diseases like cholera, plague, and influenza. In 1915, he studied at Volksschool and two years later continued to Hollandse Inlandsche School until 1924. In 1924, he received a scholarship to study at the School tot Opleiding van Inlandsche Artsen ("school for the training of native physicians", STOVIA) after attending government examinations. Three years later, he completed the preliminary test was transferred to Algemene Middelbare School, and graduated in 1930. After attending the admission test of Medical College, and being rejected, he turned to law, entering Rechts Hoogeschool in 1932 and obtaining the degree Meester in de Rechten in 1939.

== Career ==
During the Indonesian national awakening, he was active in several organizations such as Jong Islamieten Bond in 1924 and Sarekat Islam in 1925. During the revolution, he was a member of the Indonesian delegation at the Linggarjati Agreement (1946) and Renville Agreement (1948). In 1949, he was also the leader of the delegation at the Roem–Van Roijen Agreement, which discussed Indonesia's borders, and which was signed on May 7, 1949.

As a state official, he served as interior minister in the Sjahrir III Cabinet, foreign minister during the Natsir Cabinet, interior minister during the Wilopo Cabinet, and deputy prime minister during the Ali Sastroamidjojo II Cabinet.

== Prison ==
Roem was a senior figure in the Masyumi Party, which was banned by President Sukarno in 1960 for its support of the PRRI rebellion. In 1962 he was arrested and jailed without trial in Madiun, together with Sutan Sjahrir, Anuk Agung, the sultan of Pontianak Hamid, and Soedarpo Sastrosatomo. They were released by Attorney-general Sugi Aito in May 1966.

== Personal life ==
Roem married Markisah Dahlia in 1932. They had two children; a boy, Roemoso, born in 1933 and a girl, Rumeisa, born in 1939. Roem died in September 1983 from a lung disorder, leaving a wife, two children and three grandchildren.

Political offices
Preceded by Sudarsono	Interior Minister of Indonesia; 1946–1947	Succeeded by Wondoamiseno
Preceded by Wondoamiseno	1947–1948	Succeeded by Soekiman Wirjosandjojo
Preceded by Iskak Tjokrodisurjo	1952–1953	Succeeded by Hazairin
Preceded by Mohammad Hatta	Foreign Minister of Indonesia; 1950–1951	Succeeded by Achmad Soebardjo
