= Hazairin =

Indonesian politician

Prof. Dr. Mr. Hazairin Gelar Pangeran Alamsyah Harahap
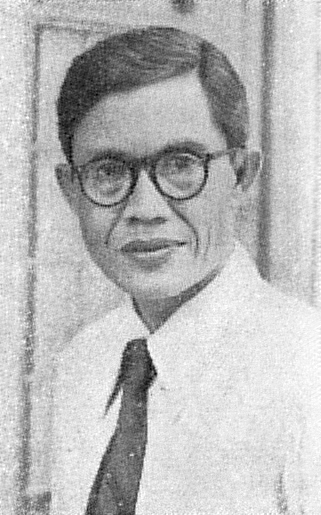
- Hazairin in 1954

Minister of Home Affairs
- In office 30 July 1953 – 18 November 1954
- President: Sukarno
- Preceded by: Mohammed Roem
- Succeeded by: Sunarjo

Personal details
- Born: 28 November 1906 Bukittinggi, Dutch East Indies
- Died: 11 December 1975 (aged 69)
- Resting place: Kalibata Heroes' Cemetery
- Citizenship: Indonesian
- Party: Great Indonesia Party

Hazairin (Gelar Pangeran Alamsyah Harahap; 28 November 1906 – 11 December 1975) was the Indonesia's Minister of Home Affairs from 30 July 1953 to 18 November 1954, serving in the First Ali Sastroamidjojo Cabinet.

== Biography ==
Hazairin was born in Bukittinggi, West Sumatra, Dutch East Indies on 28 November 1906 to a strict religious family of Persian descent. His father, Zakaria Bahar, was a teacher from Bengkulu and his mother was of Minangkabau descent. As a child, he moved to Bengkulu to begin his schooling at a Hollands Indlandsche School, or Dutch school for Native Indonesians. After graduating in 1920, he moved to Padang to study at a Meer Uitgebreid Lager Onderwijs, graduating in 1924. During the same period, he studied Arabic and the Quran with his grandfather, expanding on his Islamic studies in his own time.

Hazairin later left for Bandung, in West Java, to study at the Algemene Middelbare School there, graduating in 1927. He then went to Batavia (modern day Jakarta) to study at the Institute of Law (Rechtkundige Hoogeschool), focusing on adat law. He graduated in 1935.

After graduation, Hazairin returned to Bengkulu under the tutelage of B. Ter Haar, a respected Dutch expert on adat, to study the Rejang people there. Using the results as the basis for his dissertation, entitled "De Redjang" ("The Rejang"), he received a doctorate on 29 May 1936. He was the only native Indonesian doctor to graduate from the Batavia Institute of Law. From 1935 until 1938 he also served as a guest lecturer at the institution.

In 1938 Hazairin obtained a post at a court in Padang Sidempuan, North Sumatra, where he stayed until the Japanese invaded the Indies in 1942; during the same period he served to enforce adat law throughout South Tapanuli. Throughout the Japanese occupation, he served as one of their legal advisers.

After Indonesia's independence in 1945, Hazairin served as chief justice of the South Tapanuli court. He also served on the Central Indonesian National Committee. In 1946, he was promoted to regent (residen) of Bengkulu, also becoming the Vice Military Governor of South Sumatra; during his time as regent, he released his own currency to bolster the faltering economy of the region. In 1948, he served as head of the Great Indonesia Party (Partai Indonesia Raya), an offshoot of the Indonesian National Party, which he had helped found.

In 1950 Hazairin returned to Jakarta, becoming a lecturer on adat and Islamic law at the University of Indonesia. In early 1953 he served as the head of the Civil / Criminal Law Division at the Ministry of Justice. He later was selected as Minister of Internal Affairs for the First Ali Sastroamidjojo Cabinet, serving from 30 July 1953 to 18 November 1954. During his term, he helped pass a law guaranteeing inheritance rights to children born out of wedlock and unmarried live-together partners. He later served in the Ministry of Justice, retiring in 1959.

After retiring from politics, Hazairin founded the Wakaf Foundation of Islamic Higher Learning (Yayasan Wakaf Perguruan Tinggi Islam, later the Islamic University of Jakarta Foundation) in Jakarta, later serving as the rector of its university. Beginning in 1960 until his death on 11 December 1975, he served as president of Syarif Hidayatullah State Islamic University. He also taught at the Jakarta School of Policing (Perguruan Tinggi Ilmu Kepolisian).

== Views ==
Hazairin wrote extensively on marriage law in relation to Islam, and is considered a moderate. He saw Islam as having a bilateral marriage system; in other words, not matrilineal and not patrilineal. He based this opinion on three things. Firstly, he read Sura An-Nisa verses 23 and 24 as allowing cousin marriages, which in his opinion showed support for the bilateral system. Secondly, he noted that verse 11 of Sura An-Nisa allowed inheritances to both sons and daughters; he believed that a patrilineal society would only allow sons to inherit wealth. Finally, verses 12 and 176 of Sura An-Nisa allowed all siblings to share equally in the inheritance.

== Legacy ==
For his work in South Tapanuli, Hazairin was given the title Gelar Pangeran Alamsyah Harahap. The government awarded him several medals, including the Bintang Satya Lencana Widya Satia, the Bintang Gerilya, the Bhayangkara Kelas III, and the Bintang Kartika Eka Paksi Kelas III. Hazairin University in Bengkulu is named after him.

== Personal life ==
Hazairin was a polyglot, fluent in Dutch, Indonesian, English, and French, with a passive comprehension of Arabic, Latin, and German.

== Selected works ==
Hazairin published 17 works regarding adat and Islamic law, with those about adat noting the diversity found in Indonesia, and those on Islamic law pushing for an amalgamation of Islamic and secular law. Among his works are:

- Hazairin (1936). De Redjang [The Rejang] (in Dutch). OCLC 602945522.
- Hazairin (1941). De gevolgen van de huwelijks-ontbinding in Zuid-Tapanoeli [The Effects of Divorce in South Tapanuli] (in Dutch). OCLC 65063428.
- Hazairin (1941). Reorganisatie van het rechtswezen in Zuid-Tapanoeli [Legal Reorganization in South Tapanuli] (in Dutch). OCLC 65068840.
- Hazairin (1952). Indonesia Suatu Masdjid [Indonesia, a Mosque] (in Indonesian). Jakarta: Bulan Bintang. OCLC 23537881.
- Hazairin (1958). Hukum Kewarisan Bilateral menurut Al-Qur'an [Bilateral Inheritance Law according to the Quran] (in Indonesian). Jakarta: Tintamas. OCLC 44081340.
- Hazairin (1968). Hukum Kekeluargaan Nasional [National Family Law] (in Indonesian). Jakarta: Tintamas. OCLC 9311411.
- Hazairin (1973). Demokrasi Pancasila [Pancasila Democracy] (in Indonesian). Jakarta: Tintamas.
