= Committee for Inter-Parliamentary Cooperation =

- Badan Kerja Sama Antar Parlemen
- Abbreviation: BKSAP
- Predecessor: Indonesian Inter-Parliamentary Organization
- Formation: June 7, 1974; 52 years ago
- Chairperson: Fadli Zon
- Vice Chairperson: Charles Honoris; Putu Suparma Rudana; Mardani
- Parent organization: People's Representative Council

The Committee for Inter-Parliamentary Cooperation (Indonesian: Badan Kerja Sama Antar Parlemen, BKSAP) is a committee formed and ran by the People's Representative Council of Indonesia. The committee constitutes as a standing complementary organ of the council.

The composition and membership of the committee is determined by the People's Representative Council in the Plenary Meeting in proportion to and for the proportion of an even distribution of the number of members faction.

== History ==
Committee for Inter-Parliamentary Cooperation was initially established during the organizing of the Plenary Session of the People's Representative Council on June 7, 1974. The Session decided to disband the Indonesian Inter-Parliamentary Organization (IIPO) and at the same time ratified the establishment of the Inter-Parliamentary Cooperation Committee (PKSAP). Decision on the establishment of the Committee was set forth in Decree of the Leadership of the People's Representative Council Number 27, dated June 7, 1974.

Upon the enhanced involvement of DPR RI in international affairs and broader issues, the status of the PKSAP was upgraded with the establishment of Committee for Inter-Parliamentary Cooperation (BKSAP). The status, composition and duties of BKSAP were included in Decree of DPR RI Number 14, dated June 28, 1979 regarding Revision to Regulation on Rules of Procedures of DPR RI. Matters pertaining to the existence of BKSAP had continually been revised through several amendments to Decree of DPR RI regarding Committee for Inter-Parliamentary Cooperation (BKSAP), which was initiated by the 1983 amendment through Decree of DPR RI Number 10, dated February 26, 1983, up to the most recent amendment.

== Bibliography ==
- People's Representative Council (2009), Committee for Inter-Parliamentary Cooperation: At a Glance, Jakarta: Committee for Inter-Parliamentary Cooperation
