= Federal Consultative Assembly =

1949 committee during Indonesian independence talks

The Federal Consultative Assembly, (or Dutch: Bijeenkomst voor Federaal Overleg, BFO) was a committee established on 8 July 1948 to discuss the form of the planned federal United States of Indonesia. Its membership comprised the leaders of the various federal states established by the Dutch in the areas they occupied following their attack on the areas of Indonesia controlled by republican forces during the Indonesian National Revolution (1945–1949). It took part in negotiations with the Dutch in August and September 1948, and participated in the Dutch–Indonesian Round Table Conference at which the Dutch agreed to hand over sovereignty to the United States of Indonesia.

== Background ==
On 9 March 1948, Acting Governor-General of the Dutch East Indies Hubertus van Mook established a Provisional Federal Government, which was essentially the same as the colonial government, with substantial powers remaining in the hands of the Dutch. A conference was organized in Bandung for representatives of the federal states to discuss issues related to the form of government of the future federal state and its relationship with the Netherlands. The Dutch also hoped that the presence of high-profile non-republican figures would provide political support. The Bandung Conference was opened by van Mook on 27 May.

According to Ide Anak Agung Gde Agung, he had the idea of establishing a body from among the delegates at the conference to represent the federal states as a response to these efforts by van Mook to establish a state on terms favourable to the Dutch. Together with Adil Poeadiredja, Prime Minister of the State of Pasundan, he invited the leaders of 13 states and regions together with observers from a further three – all outside the area controlled by republican forces – to a meeting in Bandung on 8 July 1948. The aim of the conference was to break the deadlock with the Dutch and identify a solution to the "Indonesian problem".

After five days of discussions, the delegates agreed on an outline for an interim federal government, and resolved that their proposal, which became known as the "Bandung Resolution", would be conveyed to van Mook, the Dutch government and the Republican government in Yogyakarta. These delegates then named themselves the Federal Consultative Assembly (BFO). Each region represented in it had one vote, regardless of size.

== Dutch response to the Bandung Resolution ==
In July, a BFO delegation led by chairman T. Bahrioen from East Sumatra, delivered the "Bandung Resolution" to Van Mook. As the Dutch had assumed that the federal leaders would agree with the Dutch proposals, rather than taking the initiative, this came as a shock, and van Mook expressed considerable displeasure. However, a BFO delegation was invited to the Hague for discussions with the Dutch government. The Dutch subsequently put forward a counter-proposal that would have meant the Dutch government representative during the transition to the United States of Indonesia would have retained extensive authority. This was unanimously rejected by the BFO. More consultation followed, and on 14 December 1948, the Dutch government issued an Indonesian Interim Period Administrative Ordnance (Dutch: Besluit bewind Indonesië in overgangstijd), known as the BIO Decree, which laid down the form of the interim administration and the procedure for the establishment of the United States of Indonesia. However, despite the consultations, the content of this decree contained very little of the BFO proposal. It gave the Dutch a veto on actions by the Indonesian administration, as well as "absolute and unrestricted power" to decide on the final form of the federal Indonesian state.

== Inter-Indonesian Conferences ==
On 19 December 1948, the Dutch launched a "police action" known as Operation Kraai to regain control over those areas still controlled by republican forces. Despite the military success, including the capture of Yogyakarta, it triggered worldwide condemnation, and the Dutch were pressured to negotiate with the republicans. This led to the 7 May 1949 Roem–van Roijen Agreement, at which the republicans agreed to join the BFO at the Round Table Conference in the Hague at which the Dutch would hand over power to the United States of Indonesia.

Before this agreement was reached, Anak Agung proposed a pan-Indonesia conference so the federalists and republicans could agree a common position on the eventual outcome of the Round Table Conference, independently of the Dutch. Given the moral and political dominance of the republicans, the first of these conferences was held in from 19 to 22 July in the republican capital Yogyakarta, rather than Batavia and the pro-federal Anak Agung had wanted. The second took place in Batavia from 20 July-2 August. Among the points agreed were:

- sovereignty would be handed over to the United States of Indonesia from both the Netherlands and the Republic of Indonesia
- in the 150-seat USI House of Representatives, the BFO states would have 100 seats, and the Republic of Indonesia 50
- in the 32-seat Senate, the BFO states would have 32 seats, and the Republic of Indonesia two
- the USI army would be formed exclusively from the Indonesian Republican Army
- Sukarno would be president, while Mohammad Hatta would be prime minister

== Round Table Conference and afterwards ==
The BFO delegation at the Round Table Conference was led by Syarif Hamid II of Pontianak, while the Indonesian republican delegation was headed by Mohammad Hatta. Because of the inter-Indonesia conferences, the two Indonesian delegates showed a united front. Talks began on 23 August 1949, and led to agreement for the "unconditional and complete transfer of sovereignty" of the former Dutch East Indies (Except for Western New Guinea) to the United States of Indonesia.

Following ratification of the agreement by the Indonesian republican provisional legislature, the Central Indonesian National Committee, the 15 federal states and the Dutch parliament, sovereignty was transferred to the United States of Indonesia on 27 December 1949. The nation's first Republic of the United States of Indonesia Cabinet was dominated by men from the Republic of Indonesia, which was now one part of the USI. Only five of the 16 ministers were from BFO states, and of these, only two, Anak Agung and Sultan Hamid II, were supporters of the federal state. With less of a role to play now the state had been established, the authority of BFO was now in decline. In the first few months of 1950, most of the components of the USI dissolved themselves into the Republic of Indonesia, and on 17 August 1950, the federal state was replaced by a unitary Republic of Indonesia.

== Chairman of the Federal Consultative Assembly ==
Chairman of the Federal Consultative Assembly
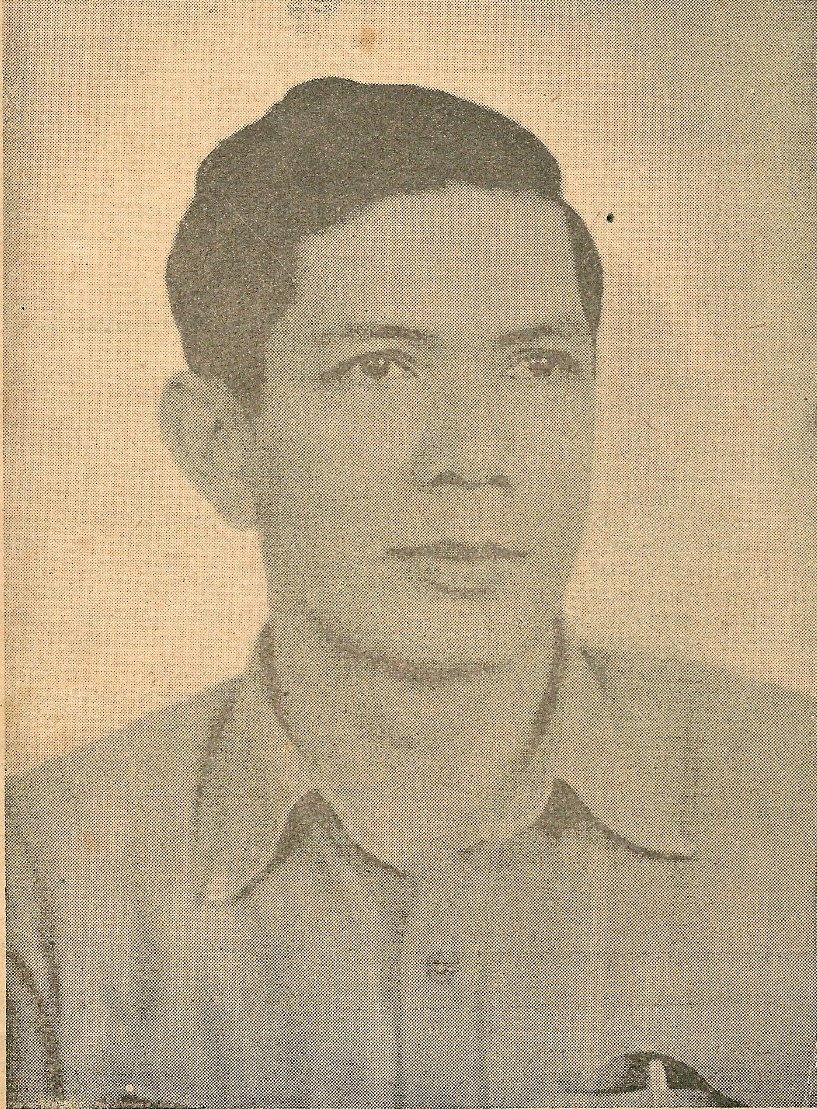
Tengku Bahriun
7 July 1948 – 13 January 1949

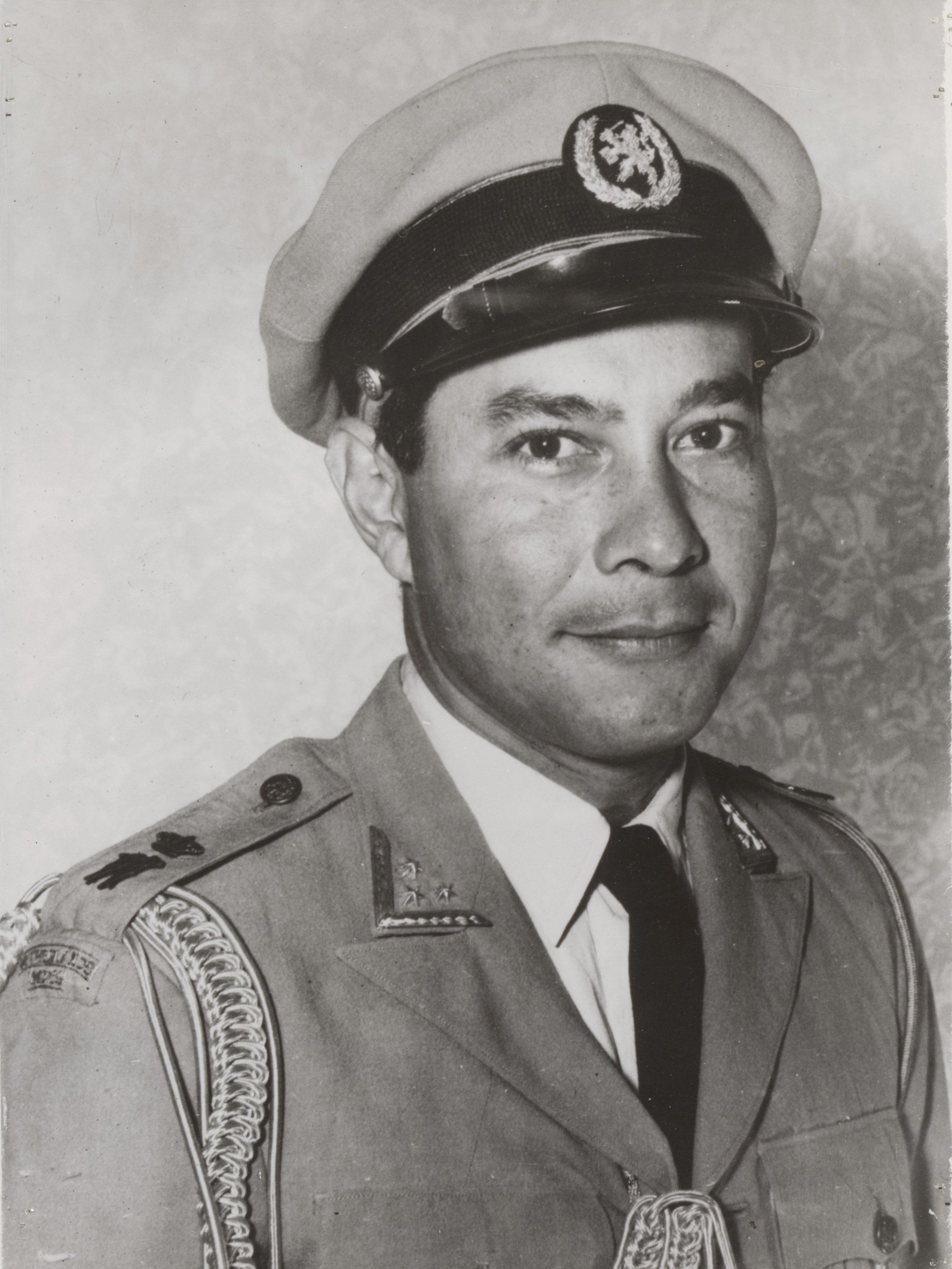
Sultan Hamid II
13 January 1949 – 17 August 1950
