= Dutch–Indonesian Round Table Conference =

1949 Dutch recognition of Indonesian independence

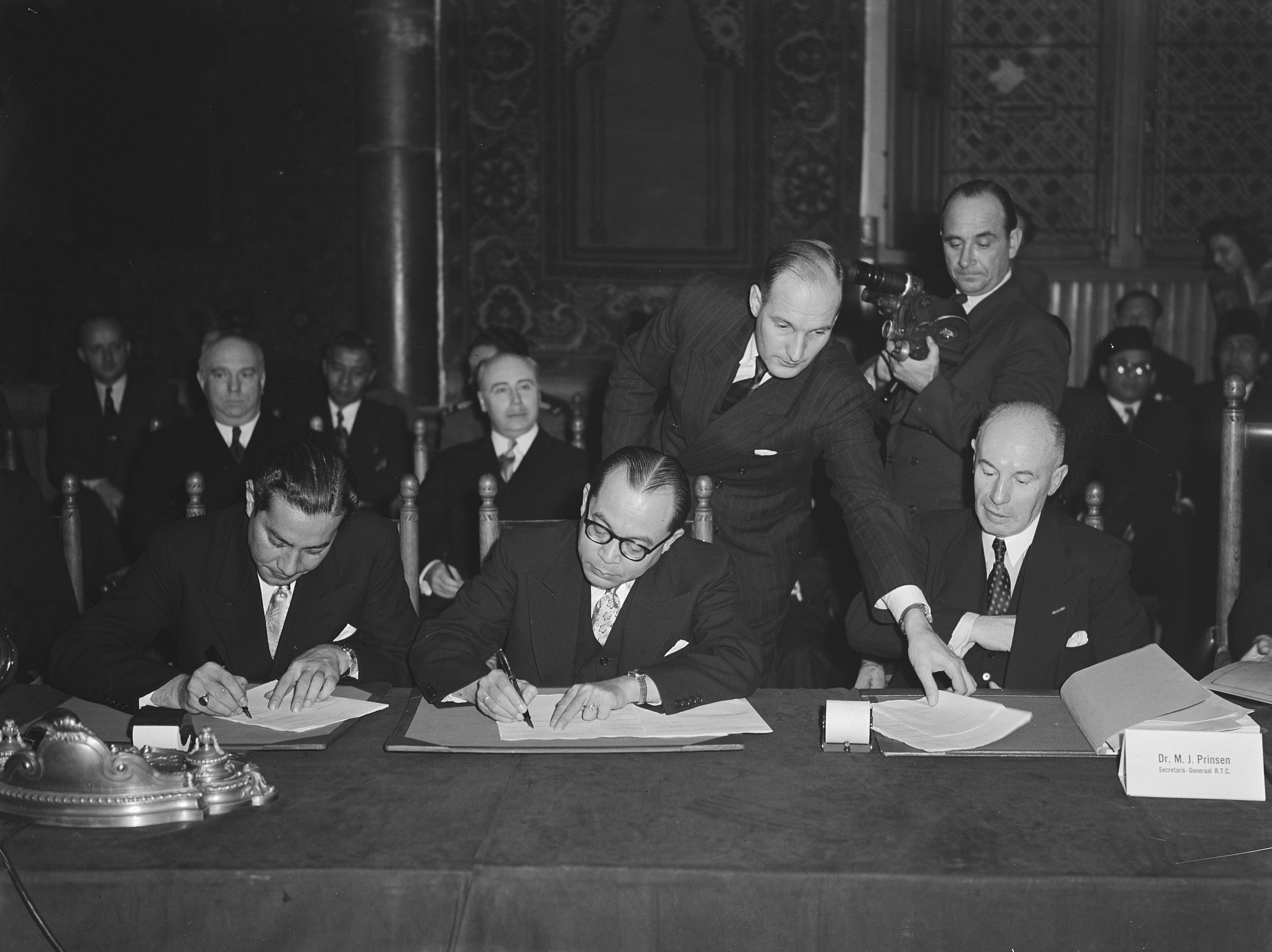
- Closing session of the Round Table Conference, Sultan Hamid II and Mohammad Hatta can be seen signing the resulting agreement, 2 November 1949
- Type: Cession of sovereignty
- Drafted: 23 August 1949
- Signed: 2 November 1949
- Location: The Hague, Netherlands
- Effective: 27 December 1949; 76 years ago
- Signatories: Federal Consultative Assembly; Kingdom of the Netherlands; Republic of Indonesia

The Dutch–Indonesian Round Table Conference (Dutch: Nederlands-Indonesische rondetafelconferentie; Indonesian: Konferensi Meja Bundar) was held in The Hague from 23 August to 2 November 1949, between representatives of the Kingdom of the Netherlands, the Republic of Indonesia and the Federal Consultative Assembly, representing various states the Dutch had created in the Indonesian archipelago.

Prior to this conference, three other high-level meetings between the Netherlands and Indonesia took place; the Linggadjati Agreement of 1947, Renville Agreement of 1948, and the Roem–Van Roijen Agreement in May 1949. The conference ended with the cession of sovereignty to the United States of Indonesia.

== Background ==
On 17 August 1945, Indonesian nationalist leader Sukarno declared Indonesian independence from Japan. The Dutch, who had been expelled in 1942 by the Japanese occupation of the Dutch East Indies, viewed the Indonesian leadership as Japanese collaborators, and wanted to regain control of their colony. The conflict between the Dutch and Indonesian nationalists developed into the Indonesian National Revolution.

By mid-1946, both sides were under international pressure to negotiate. The Dutch favoured a federal Indonesian state, and organised the Malino Conference in July 1946, which led to the establishment of the State of East Indonesia. In November, the Dutch and Indonesian sides reached an agreement at Linggadjati, in which the Netherlands agreed to recognize republican rule over Java, Sumatra and Madura, and that republic would become a constituent state of a federal United States of Indonesia. On 28 January 1949, the United Nations Security Council passed Resolution 67, calling for an end to the recent Dutch military offensive against republican forces in Indonesia and demanding the restoration of the republican government. It also urged the resumption of negotiations to find a peaceful settlement between the two sides.

Following the Roem–Van Roijen Agreement of 6 July, which effectively endorsed the Security Council resolution, Mohammad Roem said that the Republic of Indonesia—whose leaders were still in exile on Bangka Island—would participate in the Round Table Conference to accelerate the transfer of sovereignty.

The Indonesian government, in exile for over six months, returned to the temporary capital at Yogyakarta on 6 July 1949. To ensure commonality of negotiating position between the republic and the federal delegates, from 31 July until 2 August, Inter-Indonesian Conferences were in Yogyakarta between all component authorities of the future United States of Indonesia. The delegates agreed on the basic principles and outline for the Federal Constitution of 1949.

Following preliminary discussions sponsored by the UN Commission for Indonesia in Jakarta, it was decided the Round Table Conference would be held in The Hague.

== Negotiations ==
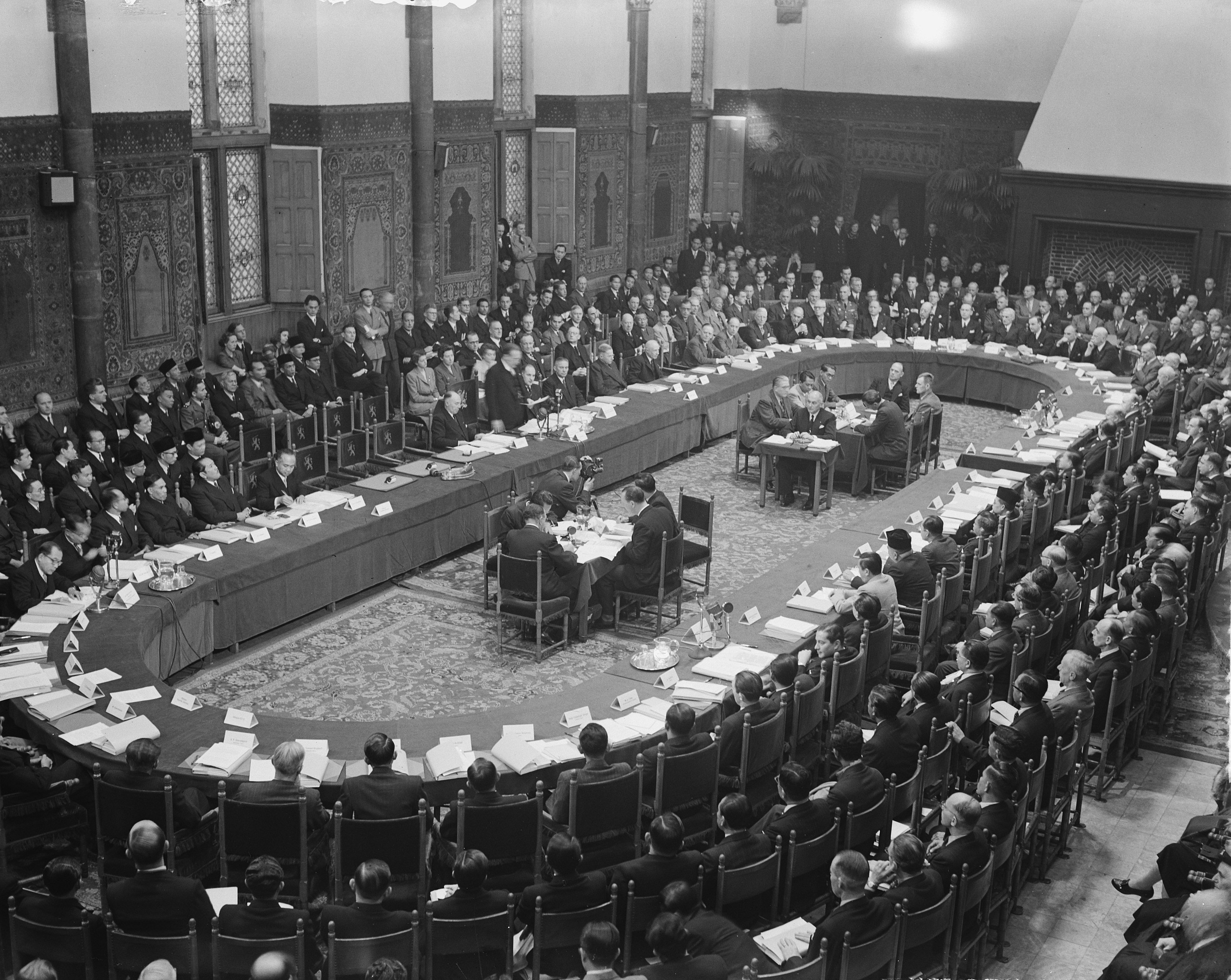
Final session of the Round Table Conference on 2 November 1949

Negotiations, which took place from 23 August to 2 November 1949, were assisted by the United Nations Commission for Indonesia. The Dutch, Republic of Indonesia and Federal Consultative Assembly delegations reached agreement resulting in a number of documents, namely a Charter of Transfer of Sovereignty—to come into immediate effect—a statute of union, a draft constitution, an economic agreement and agreements on social and military affairs.

The Dutch–Indonesian Union would not have any powers: it would be a consultative body with a permanent secretariat, a court of arbitration to settle any legal disputes, and a minimum of two ministerial conferences every year. It would be headed by the Dutch Queen in an entirely symbolic role.

The delegations also reached agreement on the withdrawal of Dutch troops "within the shortest possible time," and for the United States of Indonesia to grant most favoured nation status to the Netherlands. In addition, there would be no discrimination against Dutch nationals or companies and the republic agreed to take over trade agreements negotiated by the Dutch East Indies. However the two major areas of disagreement were over the debts of the Dutch colonial administration and the status of Western New Guinea.

Negotiations over the internal and external debts of the Dutch East Indies colonial administration were protracted, with each side presenting their own calculations and arguing over whether the United States of Indonesia should be responsible for debts incurred by the Dutch after the Japanese occupation of the Dutch East Indies in 1942. In particular the Indonesian delegations were indignant at having to cover what it saw as the costs of Dutch military action against it. Finally, thanks to the intervention of the United States member of the UN Commission on Indonesia, the Indonesian side came to realise that agreeing to pay part of the Dutch debt would be the price they would have to pay for the transfer of sovereignty. On 24 October, the Indonesian delegations agreed that Indonesia would take over approximately ƒ4.5 billion of Dutch East Indies government debt.

The issue of the inclusion or not of Western New Guinea almost resulted in the talks becoming deadlocked. The Indonesian delegations took the view that Indonesia should comprise the entire territory of Dutch East Indies. The Dutch refused to compromise, claiming Western New Guinea had no ethnic ties with the rest of the archipelago. Despite Dutch public opinion supporting transfer of Western New Guinea to Indonesia, the Dutch cabinet was worried it would not be able to ratify the Round Table Agreement in parliament if it conceded this point.

Finally, in the early hours of 1 November 1949, a compromise was reached: the status of Western New Guinea would be determined through negotiations between the United States of Indonesia and the Netherlands within a year of the transfer of sovereignty. The conference was officially closed in the Dutch parliament building on 2 November.

== Aftermath ==
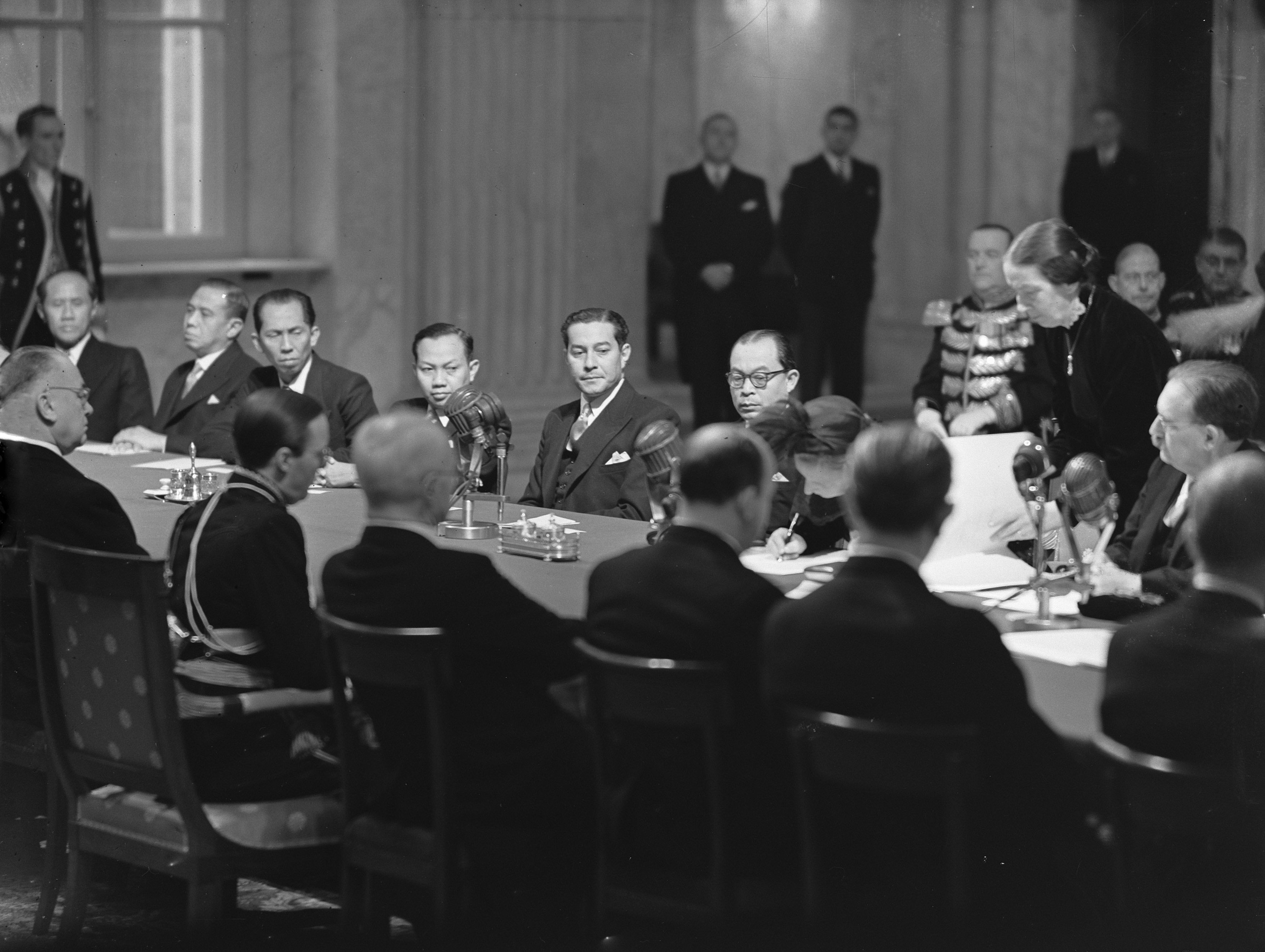
Queen Juliana signing the treaty that transferred sovereignty to Indonesia, 27 December 1949

The Dutch parliament debated the agreement, and the upper and lower houses ratified it on 21 December 1949 by the two-thirds majority needed. Despite criticism in particular of the Indonesian assumption of Dutch government debt and the unresolved status of Western New Guinea, the Indonesian legislature, the Central Indonesian National Committee, ratified the agreement on 14 December. Sovereignty was transferred to the United States of Indonesia on 27 December.

1. The Kingdom of the Netherlands unconditionally and irrevocably transfers complete sovereignty over Indonesia to the Republic of the United States of Indonesia, and thus recognises the Republic of the United States of Indonesia as an independent and sovereign Nation.
2. The Republic of the United States of Indonesia accepts this sovereignty based on the provisions of its Constitution; the Kingdom of the Netherlands has been notified of this proposed constitution.

The unresolved status of Western New Guinea would lead to a 12-year dispute. Political parties in Netherlands considered Indonesia dissolving the United States of Indonesia in 1950 into the original Republic of Indonesia as a pretense to not negotiate further on status of New Guinea which was promised to be completed in 1950, voiding the Round Table Agreement, according to the Indonesian side. In response, Indonesia nationalized Dutch companies and assets, and stopped paying the above-mentioned debt. (Note: The debt included unpaid salaries of Netherlands Indies government personnel, including colonial administrators and military personnel of the K.N.I.L. and the Gouvernementsmarine, dating from their internment in Japanese concentration camps during the Second World War. This became a cause celèbre in the Netherlands as the Dutch government refused to pay these arrears because it reasoned that they were owed by Indonesia.) By around 1956, the remaining (not-recognized) debt of Indonesia was around ƒ600 million. This means that in the period of 1950-1956 ƒ3.9 billion had already been paid. After the conflict was resolved in 1962, Indonesia restarted payment of around ƒ620 million. By 1965, 36 installments of unknown amounts had been made. The remainder was paid from 1976 in 30 installments, with a 1% annual interest rate until the last payment was made in 2002.

Some journalists characterize the aftermath of the Dutch–Indonesian Round Table Conference as 'the price of independence,' suggesting that the Indonesian government was purchasing its sovereignty.

== Sources ==
- Agung, Ide Anak Agung Gde (1973). Twenty Years Indonesian Foreign Policy: 1945–1965. Mouton & Co. ISBN 979-8139-06-2.
- Hasil-Hasil Konperensi Medja Bundar sebagaimana diterima pada Persidangan Umum yang kedua Terlangsung Tangal 2 Nopember 1949 di Ridderzaal di Kota 'S-Gravenhage (Results of the Round Table Conference as Accepted at the Plenary Session on 2 November 1949 at the Ridderzaal in the Hague) (in Indonesian), Djakarta: G. Kolff & Co., 1949
- Kahin, George McTurnan (1961) [1952]. Nationalism and Revolution in Indonesia. Ithaca, New York: Cornell University Press.
- Ricklefs, M.C. (2008) [1981], A History of Modern Indonesia Since c. 1200 (4th ed.), Palgrave MacMillan, ISBN 978-0-230-54686-8
- Taylor, Alastair M. (1960). Indonesian Independence and the United Nations. Ithaca, N.Y.: Cornell University Press. ISBN 0-837-18005-8.
- United Nations Security Council (1950). Indonesië in de Veiligheidsraad van de Verenigde Naties [Indonesia in the United Nations Security Council]. Staatsdrukkerij- en Uitgeverijbedrijf. p. 228.
