= Teuku Mohammad Hasan =

Indonesian politician (1906–1997)

Mr. Teuku Muhammad Hasan
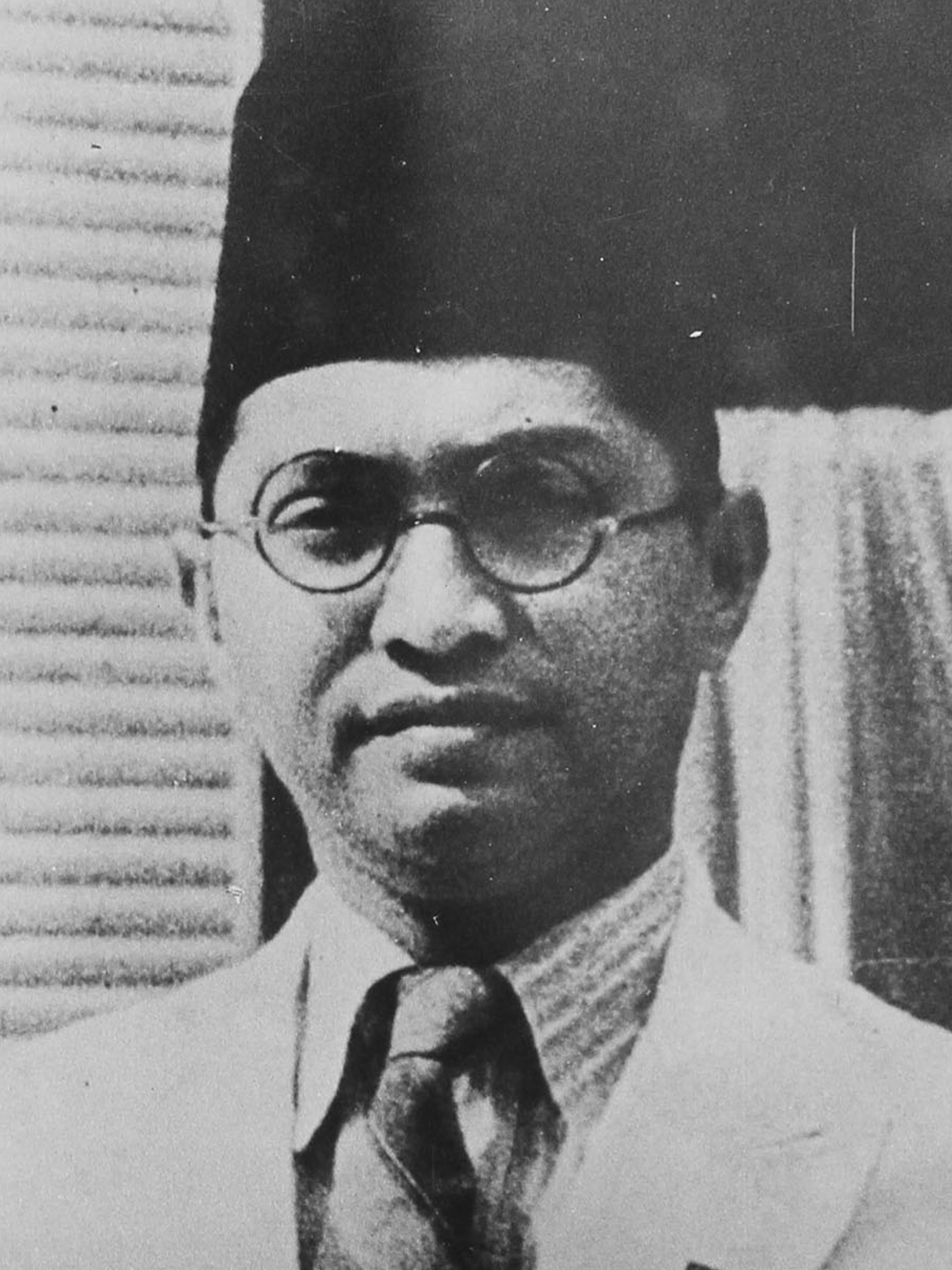
- Portrait, date unknown

1st Governor of Sumatra
- In office 29 September 1945 – 31 May 1948
- Deputy: Mohammad Amir
- Preceded by: Office established
- Succeeded by: Office disestablished
Cabinet posts
Minister of Education (acting)
In office 19 December 1948 – 13 July 1949
Head of government	Sjafruddin Prawiranegara
Preceded by	Ali Sastroamidjojo
Succeeded by	Ki Sarmidi Mangunsarkoro
Minister of Religious Affairs (acting)
In office 19 December 1948 – 13 July 1949
Head of government	Sjafruddin Prawiranegara
Preceded by	Masjkur
Succeeded by	Masjkur
Minister of Home Affairs (acting)
In office 19 December 1948 – 31 March 1949
Head of government	Sjafruddin Prawiranegara
Preceded by	Soekiman Wirjosandjojo
Succeeded by	Wongsonegoro

1st Deputy Speaker of the United States of Indonesia Senate
- In office 25 February 1950 – 16 August 1950
- Preceded by: Office established
- Succeeded by: Office disestablished

United States of Indonesia Senator
- In office 16 February 1950 – 16 August 1950 Serving with Soemanang Soerjowinoto
- Constituency: Indonesia

Member of the People's Representative Council
- In office 16 August 1950 – 20 March 1956

Personal details
- Born: Teuku Sarong; 4 April 1906 Pidie, Dutch East Indies
- Died: 21 September 1997 (aged 91) Jakarta, Indonesia
- Party: Independent
- Education: Leiden University (M.L.)
- Occupation: Politician

Teuku Mohammad Hasan (EVO: Teukoe Moehammad Hasan; 4 April 1906 – 21 September 1997) was an Indonesian politician and national hero from Aceh, who served as the first and only governor of Sumatra from 1945 until 1948. He also served as a cabinet minister in Sjafruddin Prawiranegara's emergency cabinet and was a member of both the Senate of the United States of Indonesia (USI) and the Provisional People's Representative Council (DPRS) of the Republic of Indonesia.

Born to an aristocratic family in present-day Aceh, Teuku Mohammad Hasan studied law at Leiden University. During his time there, he joined the Perhimpoenan Indonesia association, becoming involved in the Indonesian independence movement. After graduating in 1933, he returned to Aceh, and became active in the Islamic organization Muhammadiyah. During the Japanese occupation, he was a member of the Preparatory Committee for Indonesian Independence. Following the proclamation of independence, he was appointed governor of Sumatra by the Central Indonesian National Committee. After the fall of the Indonesian government in Yogyakarta, he took part in the emergency government (PDRI) headed by Sjafruddin Prawiranegara. In the PDRI, he filled the position of minister in the ministries of Home Affairs, Religious Affairs, and Education.

Following the Dutch–Indonesian Round Table Conference and the end of national revolution, Teuku Mohammad Hasan served as a senator in the USI. During his time in the senate, he was elected deputy speaker to Melkias Agustinus Pellaupessy. After the dissolution of the USI and the establishment of a unitary state, he served as a member of the DPRS. In the DPRS, he advocated for oil companies operating in the country to be nationalized. He left the DPRS in 1955, and worked for the ministry of Home Affairs. During the New Order regime, he left politics entirely, and focused on education instead. In 1984, he founded the Veranda of Mecca University in Banda Aceh. He died in Jakarta, on 21 September 1997. In 2006, he was named a national hero by President Susilo Bambang Yudhoyono.

== Early life ==
Muhammad Hasan was born on April 4, 1906, as Teuku Sarong, into an aristocratic family in Sigli, Aceh. His father, Teuku Bintara Pineung Ibrahim was an ulèebalang in Pidie (ulèebalang was an aristocratic class in Aceh who led a district).

He went to Volksschool (Common School) in Lampoeh Saka from 1914-1917. In 1924 he studied at Dutch-language Europeesche Lagere School (RLS), After graduating in 1924, he studied at Koningin Wilhelmina School (KWS) in Batavia (now Jakarta) before attending Rechtshoogeschool (Law High School).

== Netherlands ==
He went to the Netherlands at age 25 to study Law at Leiden University.

During his time in Netherlands, he joined Indonesian student organization Perhimpunan Indonesia and became an independence activist with other Indonesian students like Mohammad Hatta and Sutan Sjahrir.

He graduated as Master of Laws in 1933.

== Independence struggle ==
Hasan returned to Indonesia, and landed in Ulèë Lheuë Sea Port, Kutaradja (now Banda Aceh) in 1934. His activities brought suspicion by the Dutch authorities, who confiscated his books and other possessions.

He was active in Islamic organization Muhammadiyah. During this era, they started schools and a female branch of the organization, Aisyiah.

His other education activity was establishing Perguruan Taman Siswa Aceh Chapter in Kutaraja, on 11 July 1937. He served as chairman, with Teuku Nyak Arif as secretary.

He made a scholarship foundation Atjehsche Studiefonds (Aceh Students Foundation) for supporting poor students.

He chaired Perkumpulan Usaha Sama Akan Kemajuan Anak (Mutual Struggle Association for Children Development, or abbreviated as PUSAKA) attempting to build a school similar to Dutch's Holland Inlandsche School.

During the Japanese occupation of the Dutch East Indies (1942 - 1945), he was chairman of Koperasi Ladang Pegawai Negeri (Field Cooperative for the Civil Servants) in Medan.

He was a member of the Sumatran Investigating Committee for Preparatory Work for Independence (BPUPK) and subsequently the Preparatory Committee for Indonesian Independence. This body was chaired by Sukarno, who declared Indonesian independence on August 17, 1945, two days after Japan surrendered to the Allied Forces at the end of the Pacific War.

== Governor of Sumatra ==
He was appointed by the newly created Republic of Indonesia Government as the first Governor of Sumatra on August 22, 1945.

== Emergency Government ==
In December 1948, the Dutch launched their Second Police Action and focused their attack on Yogyakarta. Sukarno and Hatta chose to remain in the city and were arrested.

Hearing the president was arrested, Sjafruddin Prawiranegara, the Minister of Welfare, who was in Bukit Tinggi met Hasan, then Governor of Sumatra and Colonel Hidayat, Commander of Army and Territory of Sumatra on December 19, 1948. and established the Emergency Government of the Republic of Indonesia (PDRI), on December 22, 1948, in Bukittinggi, Sumatra. Sjafruddin served as chairman of the emergency cabinet.

Hasan was appointed as Deputy Chairman of the PDRI, Minister of Home Affairs, Education & Culture and Religious Affairs ad interim.

PDRI leaders moved around West Sumatra in an effort to evade arrest by the Dutch who wanted to abolish the group. In 1949 the PDRI government contacted the leaders of Indonesian forces in Java and the sixth Republic of Indonesia government ministers in Java who had escaped arrest.

Based on the Roem–Van Roijen Agreement, on July 13, 1949, Dutch troops were to be pulled from Republic of Indonesia regions and their leaders were to be freed. The PDRI would therefore no longer be required, and Sjafruddin Prawiranegara disbanded the PDRI and returned the mandate to the President of Republic of Indonesia.

== Oil companies nationalization ==
In 1951, as chair of Trading and Industry Commission of DPRS (People's Representative Council), he advocated for oil company nationalization in Indonesia. His motion was accepted on August 2, 1951. Some Dutch oil companies were integrated into Permina (1957) and Pertamin (1961). Both companies were merged in 1968 as Pertamina.

== Later life ==
Hasan established Serambi Mekkah University in Banda Aceh, and writing books. One of his book is Sejarah Perminyakan di Indonesia (published by Yayasan Sari Pinang Sakti, 1985).

Teuku Muhammad Hasan died on September 21, 1997, in Jakarta.

== Recognition ==
In 1990, University of North Sumatra honored him with Doctor Honoris Causa.

Hasan was recognized as National Hero of Indonesia by Republic Indonesia Government on dated November 3, 2006.

A street in Banda Aceh is named after him.
