= First Hatta Cabinet =

Cabinet of Indonesia (1948–1949)

First Hatta Cabinet Kabinet Hatta I
- Cabinet of Indonesia
- 29 January 1948 – 4 August 1949
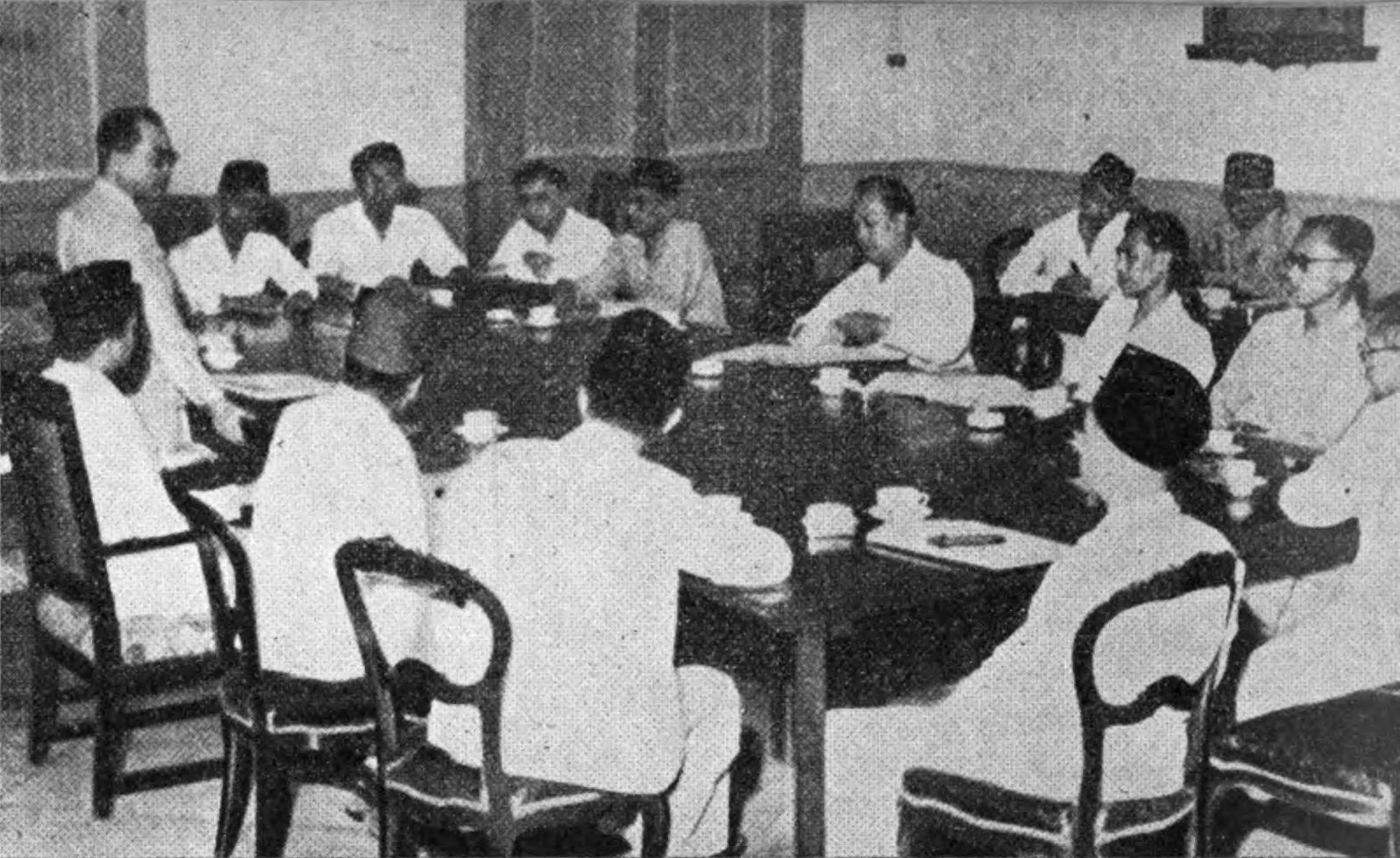
- First meeting of the cabinet
- Date formed: 29 January 1948
- Date dissolved: 4 August 1949

People and organisations
- President: Sukarno
- Prime Minister: Mohammad Hatta
- Member party: Masyumi; Indonesian National Party; Indonesian Christian Party; Socialist - Sjahrir's faction Independent
- Status in legislature: KNIP: Minority coalition 132 / 514
- Opposition party: People's Democratic Front: Socialist - Sjarifuddin's faction Communist Party of Indonesia; Labour Party of Indonesia
- Opposition leader: Munawar Musso (until October 1948); Amir Sjarifoeddin (October–December 1948)

History
- Predecessor: Amir Sjarifuddin II
- Successor: Emergency (exile); Hatta II

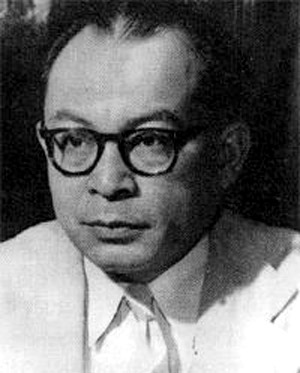
Mohammad Hatta

The First Hatta Cabinet (Indonesian: Kabinet Hatta I) was Indonesia's seventh cabinet. It was formed by Vice President Mohammad Hatta, who was instructed to do so by President Sukarno on 23 January 1948, the same day the previous cabinet was declared dissolved. Following the second Dutch military aggression, when the republican capital of Yogyakarta was seized and most of the cabinet arrested, much of the cabinet was captured and sent into exile, although it was not formally disbanded. After the political leadership returned effective 13 July 1949 the cabinet continued its mandate until it was reshuffled on 4 August.

== Formation ==
The Second Amir Sjarifuddin Cabinet, under Prime Minister Amir Sjarifuddin, fell on 23 January 1948 following popular outrage over the Renville Agreement, which the populace considered having given away too much of the nascent country's political power. Mohammad Hatta, then serving as vice president, was asked by President Sukarno to form a new cabinet which united the country's political parties. Hatta kept ten members of the previous cabinet, although he did away with the deputy ministers and removed ministers with leftist leanings.

The cabinet was formed on 29 January 1948, with Hatta serving concurrently as vice president and prime minister. It formally took office on 2 February. Its mandate focused on dealing with the Renville agreement, developing the nation, and working towards a consolidated government. With General Sudirman, commander in chief of the military, Hatta worked to reduce leftist influences in the armed forces, which had been exploited during Sjarifuddin's cabinet. However, Hatta's work was greatly weakened by continued division over the Renville Agreement.

The Indonesian legal scholar and politician Bibit Suprapto writes that the Hatta Cabinets were not truly parliamentary, as Hatta continued to serve in/ the executive branch of the government, but also not truly presidential, as Hatta formally held the title of prime minister.

=== Composition ===
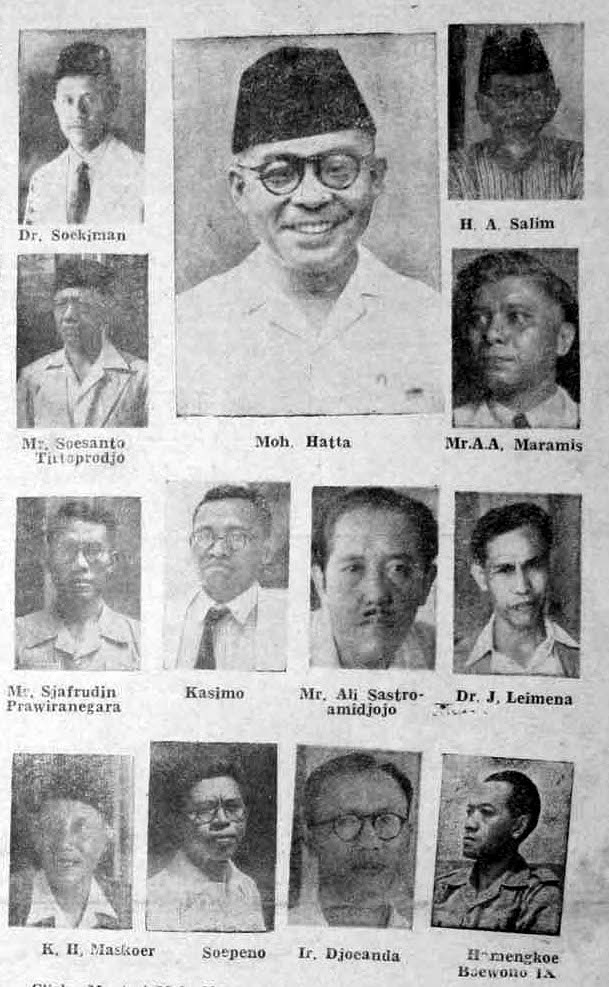
The initial composition of the First Hatta Cabinet

- Prime Minister: Mohammad Hatta
- Minister of Home Affairs ad interim: Soekiman Wirjosandjojo (Masyumi)
- Minister of Foreign Affairs ad interim: Agus Salim
- Minister of Defense ad interim: Mohammad Hatta
- Minister of Justice: Soesanto Tirtoprodjo (Indonesian National Party – PNI)
- Minister of Finance: A. A. Maramis (PNI)
- Minister of Welfare: Sjafruddin Prawiranegara (Masyumi)
- Minister of Education and Culture: Ali Sastroamidjojo (PNI)
- Minister of Health: Dr. Johannes Leimena (Parkindo)
- Minister of Religious Affairs: Masjkur (Masyumi)
- Minister of Labor and Social Affairs: Rahendra Kusnan (PGRI)
- Minister of Development and Youth Affairs: Supeno (Socialist Party)
- Minister of Transportation: Djuanda Kartawidjaja
- Minister of Public Works ad interim: Djuanda Kartawidjaja
- Minister of Information: Mohammad Natsir (Masyumi)
- State Coordinating Minister for Domestic Security: Sultan Hamengkubuwana IX

Several changes to this line-up were made during the course of the cabinet. Juanda was replaced as Minister of Public Works on 13 April 1948 by Herling Laoh. Hamengkubuwana IX replaced Hatta as Minister of Defence on 15 July 1948. Supeno died in on 24 February 1949 and was not replaced.

== Events ==
The First Hatta Cabinet was marked by an increase in international recognition of the country. Yemen and the Soviet Union, for example, recognised Indonesia's independence in May 1948.

=== Internal dissent ===
The former prime minister, Sjarifuddin, did not accept the fall of his cabinet; leftist forces had controlled the cabinet since Indonesia's independence in 1945. Together with the Communist Party figure Muso, he formed the People's Democracy Front (Front Demokrasi Rakyat, or FDR), which opposed the Hatta cabinet and called for a new, leftist, cabinet. In early February 1948 they were already meeting and discussing how to handle the new cabinet.

The FDR surmised that the cabinet, which prominently featured the Muslim-backed party Masyumi, would be unable to fulfill their mandate and what projects were completed would be against the needs of socialists and communists. They gave the cabinet the titles "Masyumi Cabinet" and "Bourgeois Cabinet". Throughout early 1948 the FDR criticised Islamic groups and the groups in power; they also led several strikes and called for the Hatta Cabinet to unilaterally renege the Renville Agreement. In response, the government freed Tan Malaka and other political prisoners beginning in mid-August; although those freed were also communist, they were staunchly opposed to the FDR and worked at subverting the FDR's work.

This dissent culminated in the Madiun Affair, in which FDR forces, under the command of Muso, Sjarifuddin, and other leftist figures, seized the city of Madiun, East Java, on 18 September 1948; the FDR razed homes and killed more than a thousand people, mostly Islamic figures. Four days later the Indonesian Army deployed to retake the city. The first troops arrived on 30 September and began fighting the following day, retaking the city. FDR members spread out over the area, leading to the army spending several months hunting them. Muso was killed in early October, while Sjarifuddin was captured on 29 November and executed the following month.

=== Dutch pressure ===
Following the Renville Agreement, the Van Mook Line – which separated Dutch-held areas from those held by the Indonesian republic – was formally recognised. Behind the line the Dutch established numerous minor nation-states in areas claimed by Indonesia, including Madura and Pasundan. Numerous skirmishes occurred along the line, incurred by both Indonesian and Dutch troops. The Dutch forces also continued to block the Indonesian archipelago, preventing supplies from reaching the people. As such, by December tensions between the two forces were high.

== Fall ==
During Operation Kraai, a Dutch assault on the capital at Yogyakarta which began on 19 December 1948, the cabinet and President Sukarno were captured and exiled. An emergency cabinet, under Sjafruddin Prawiranegara, was established in Sumatra; however, the Hatta Cabinet was not formally disbanded. After the political leadership was released and returned to Yogyakarta, Prawiranegara returned control of the country to Hatta's cabinet effective 13 July 1949; the Hatta cabinet retained its line-up until 4 August 1949, when it was reshuffled, again with Hatta as prime minister.
