= Sjafruddin Emergency Cabinet =

Indonesian wartime government-in-exile 1948–1949

Emergency Cabinet Kabinet Darurat
- 8th Government-in-exile of Indonesia
- 1948–1949
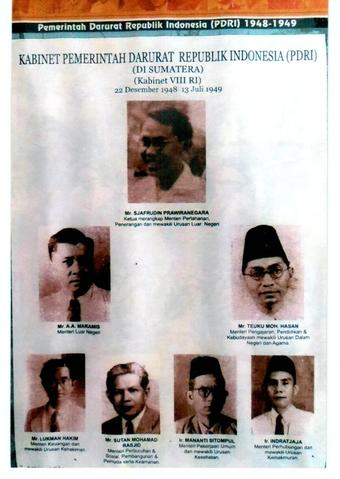
- Original cabinet composition of 1948.
- Date formed: 19 December 1948
- Date dissolved: 13 July 1949

People and organisations
- President: Sukarno (arrested)
- Vice President: Mohammad Hatta (arrested)
- Chairman: Sjafruddin Prawiranegara
- Vice Chairman: Teuku Mohammad Hasan (until 31 March 1949); Susanto Tirtoprodjo (from 31 March 1949)
- No. of ministers: 11 ministers

History
- Predecessor: Hatta I Cabinet (arrested)
- Successor: Hatta I Cabinet (restored)

Sjafruddin Prawiranegara's Emergency Cabinet (Indonesian: Kabinet Darurat) was the government of the Emergency Government of the Republic of Indonesia (PDRI), effectively Indonesia's government in exile, established in Bukittinggi, West Sumatra following the second Dutch military aggression when the republican capital of Yogyakarta was seized and most of the cabinet allowed itself to be captured in the hope of attracting sympathy from the outside world.

== Initial Composition ==
On 19 December 1948 a meeting was held in Bukittinggi. Among those present were Sjarifuddin, Mr. Teuku Muhammad Hasan (central government commissioner for Sumatra), Col. Hidayat Martaatmadja (commander of the Sumatra Command) and other civilian and military officials.

- Chairman, concurrently Minister of Defense, Information and Foreign Affairs ad interim: Sjafruddin Prawiranegara
- Deputy Chairman, concurrently Home Affairs, Education & Culture and Religious Affairs ad interim: Teuku Muhammad Hasan
- Minister of Security, concurrently Minister of Social Affairs, Development and Labor: S. M. Rasjid
- Minister of Finance, concurrently Minister of Justice: Lukman Hakim
- Minister of Public Works, concurrently Minister of Health: Mananti Sitompul
- Minister of Communications, concurrently Minister of Welfare: Indratjahja
- Secretary of the PDRI: Mardjono Danoebroto

== Reshuffle ==
Three key positions were held by officials not present in Bukitinggi: General Sudirman, who was leading the guerrilla war in Java, Foreign Minister A. A. Maramis, who was in India, and Colonel Nasution, territorial commander of Java. On 14 March 1949, the chairman sent a telegram to the leaders in Java proposing the inclusion of ministers still active in Java. After discussions via radiogram, the cabinet was reshuffled and the new lineup announced on 31 March 1949.

- Chairman, concurrently Minister of Defense and Information: Sjafruddin Prawiranegara
- Deputy Chairman, concurrently Minister of Justice, Development and Youth Affairs: Soesanto Tirtoprodjo
- Minister of Foreign Affairs: A. A. Maramis
- Minister of Home Affairs, concurrently Minister of Health: Dr. Sukiman
- Minister of Finance: Lukman Hakim
- Minister of Welfare (including supply of public provisions): Ignatius J. Kasimo
- Minister of Religious Affairs: Masjkur
- Minister of Education & Culture: Teuku Muhammad Hasan
- Minister of Communications: Indratjahja
- Minister of Public Works: Mananti Sitompul
- Minister of Labor and Social Affairs: S. M. Rasjid

== The end of the Emergency Cabinet ==
Under pressure from United Nations and the United States as well as the continuing guerilla warfare from the republican forces, the Dutch agreed to a ceasefire. In January 1949, the United Nations Security Council demanded the republican government be released and sovereignty handed over to Indonesia by 1 July 1950. The US backed this up with a threat to withdraw vital postwar reconstruction aid to the Netherlands. On 7 May the Dutch agreed to the release of Sukarno and Hatta, who would order a ceasefire once they returned to Yogyakarta. On 6 July Sukarno, Hatta and republican leaders arrived back in Yogyakarta, followed by the PDRI cabinet. In a meeting on 13 July chaired by Hatta, Sjafruddin reported to Sukarno on the activities of the emergency cabinet. He then returned his mandate to Sukarno, thus dissolving the cabinet.
