= Sjafruddin Prawiranegara =

Indonesian statesman and economist (1911–1989)

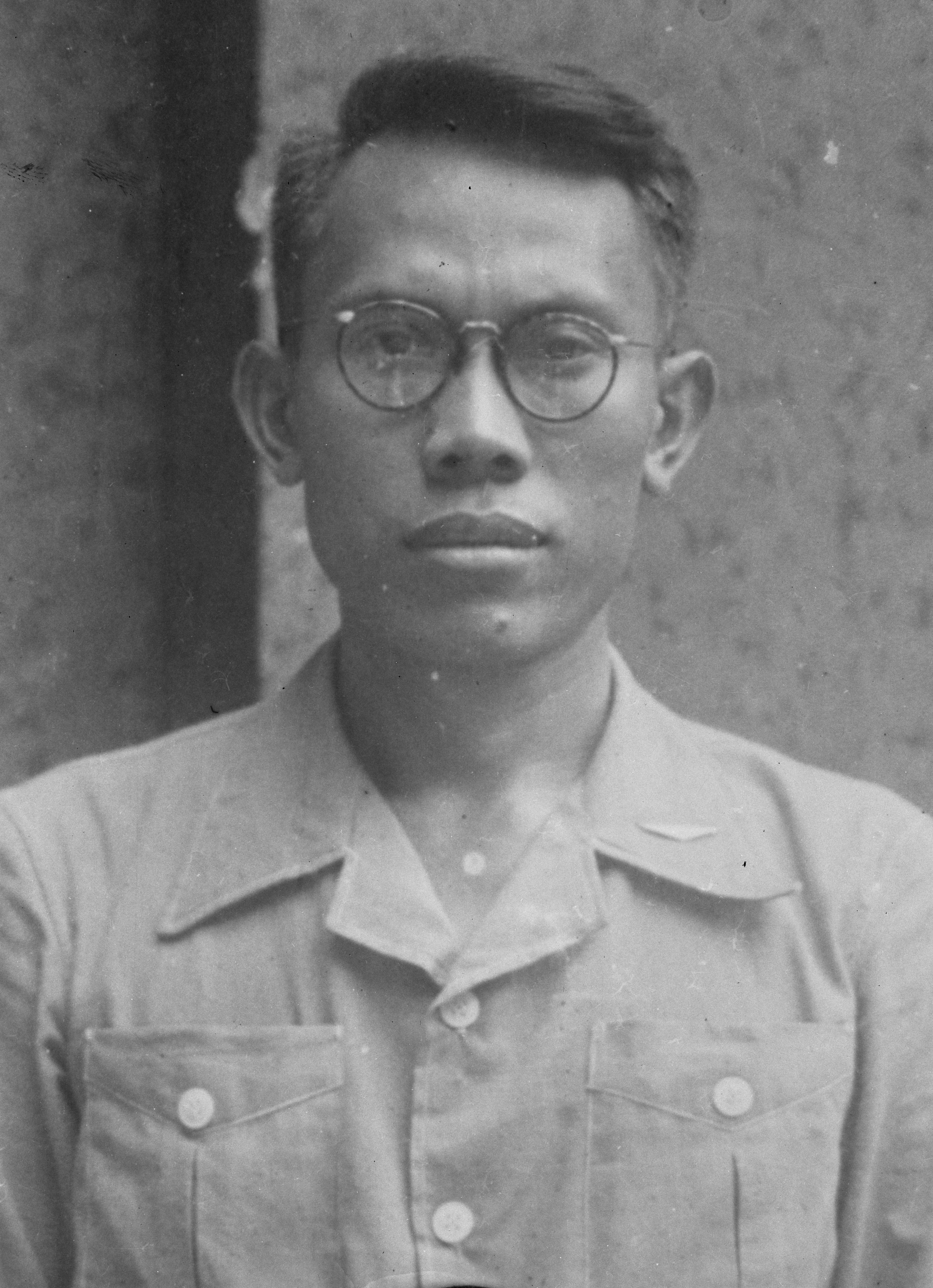
- Sjafruddin in 1947

Prime Minister of the Revolutionary Government of the Republic of Indonesia
- In office 15 February 1958 – 25 August 1961
- Preceded by: Office established
- Succeeded by: Office abolished

Chairman of the Emergency Government of the Republic of Indonesia
- In office 22 December 1948 – 13 July 1949 (Note: also as Minister of Defense and Information.)
- Preceded by: Sukarno (as President); Mohammad Hatta (as Prime Minister)
- Succeeded by: Sukarno (as President); Mohammad Hatta (as Prime Minister)

3rd Deputy Prime Minister of Indonesia
- In office 4 August 1949 – 14 December 1949
- President: Sukarno
- Prime Minister: Mohammad Hatta
- Preceded by: Adnan Kapau Gani; Setjadjit Soegondo; Samsoeddin; Wondoamiseno
- Succeeded by: Abdul Hakim Harahap

1st Governor of Bank Indonesia
- In office 1 July 1953 – 1 February 1958
- President: Sukarno
- Preceded by: Himself (as President of De Javasche Bank)
- Succeeded by: Lukman Hakim

17th President of De Javasche Bank
- In office 15 July 1951 – 1 July 1953
- President: Sukarno
- Preceded by: Andre Houwink
- Succeeded by: Himself (as Governor of Bank Indonesia)

4th Minister of Welfare
- In office 29 January 1948 – 19 December 1948
- President: Sukarno
- Prime Minister: Mohammad Hatta
- Preceded by: Adnan Kapau Gani
- Succeeded by: Ignatius Joseph Kasimo Hendrowahyono

5th Minister of Finance
- In office 20 December 1949 – 27 April 1951 (Note: Between 20 December 1949 and 6 September 1950, Sjafruddin served as Minister of Finance in the Republic of the United States of Indonesia Cabinet and not as Minister of Finance of the State of Republic of Indonesia, which was held by Lukman Hakim.)
- President: Sukarno
- Prime Minister: Mohammad Hatta; Mohammad Natsir
- Preceded by: Lukman Hakim
- Succeeded by: Jusuf Wibisono
- In office 2 October 1946 – 26 June 1947
- President: Sukarno
- Prime Minister: Sutan Sjahrir
- Preceded by: Surachman Tjokroadisurjo
- Succeeded by: Alexander Andries Maramis

1st Vice Minister of Finance
- In office 12 March 1946 – 2 October 1946
- President: Sukarno
- Prime Minister: Sutan Sjahrir
- Preceded by: Office established
- Succeeded by: Lukman Hakim

Personal details
- Born: 28 February 1911 Serang, Dutch East Indies
- Died: 15 February 1989 (aged 77) Jakarta, Indonesia
- Party: Masyumi (1946–1960)
- Spouse: Halimah Syehabuddin (m. 1941)
- Children: 8
- Education: Rechts Hogeschool
- Occupation: Politician; economist

Sjafruddin Prawiranegara (EYD: Syafruddin Prawiranegara; 28 February 1911 – 15 February 1989) was an Indonesian statesman and economist. He served in various roles during his career, including as head of government in the Emergency Government of the Republic of Indonesia (acting president of Indonesia), as Minister of Finance in several cabinets, and as the first Governor of Bank Indonesia. Sjafruddin later became the prime minister of the Revolutionary Government of the Republic of Indonesia, a shadow government set up in opposition to the country's central government.

Originating from Banten with Minangkabau ancestry, Sjafruddin became active in politics after his education in law. By 1940, he was working at a tax office, and joined the nationalist movements during the Japanese occupation period (1942–1945). Due to his closeness to the revolutionary leader Sutan Sjahrir, he was appointed finance minister in the Republican government during the Indonesian National Revolution (1945–1949). In this capacity, he lobbied for and distributed the Oeang Republik Indonesia, a predecessor currency to the Indonesian rupiah. Despite his socialist views, he joined the Islamic Masyumi party. In December 1948, a Dutch offensive captured the Indonesian revolutionary leaders including President Sukarno, resulting in Sjafruddin activating contingency plans and forming the Emergency Government of the Republic of Indonesia on 22 December. For seven months in West Sumatra, he became the head of government of Indonesia, allowing the government to continue functioning and ensuring continued resistance.

Following the Roem–Van Roijen Agreement – which he had opposed – Sjafruddin returned his governing mandate to Sukarno in July 1949. With Indonesia now independent, he was first appointed deputy prime minister, then reappointed finance minister until 1951. One of the party's leaders and its most prominent economic policymaker, he maintained a conservative approach to government budgets and established a foreign exchange certificate system. In order to reduce the money supply and curb inflation, he formulated the "Sjafruddin Cut" policy which involves physically cutting Dutch-issued banknotes in half. He then became the first governor of Bank Indonesia, where his general accommodative approach to foreign capital and opposition to nationalization caused tensions with the Sukarno government and economists such as Sumitro Djojohadikusumo.

A pragmatic policymaker, he espoused religious socialism and based his views on a liberal Islamic interpretation and was a staunch opponent of communism. His opposition to Sukarno's Guided Democracy along with Dutch–Indonesian tensions caused a significant split between Sjafruddin and the Sukarno government. Escaping to Sumatra, he made contacts with dissident army officers and began openly criticizing the government. While initially reluctant to spark a civil war, in February 1958 he became leader of the Revolutionary Government of the Republic of Indonesia in West Sumatra. The rebellion was soon defeated, and after three years of guerrilla warfare Sjafruddin surrendered to the government in 1961. Imprisoned until 1966, once released he became a vocal critic of the New Order government for its corruption and imposition of the principle of Pancasila to religious and social organizations until his death in 1989. Despite opposition from the armed forces, he was declared a National Hero of Indonesia in 2011.

== Early life and career ==
Sjafruddin was born in Anyer Kidul to an aristocratic santri family, in what is present day Serang Regency, Banten, on 28 February 1911. He was the son of a Bantenese father and a Bantenese-Minangkabau mother. His father, R. Arsyad Prawiraatmadja, was a district chief from a family of officials in Banten and was a member of the Sarekat Islam and Budi Utomo organizations. His maternal great-grandfather was a descendant of royalty in the Pagaruyung Kingdom, who had been exiled to Banten after the end of the Padri War. Sjafruddin began his education at a Europeesche Lagere School in Serang, before continuing to a Meer Uitgebreid Lager Onderwijs in Madiun. In 1931, he graduated from an Algemene Middelbare School in Bandung. He wished to continue his studies in Leiden in the Netherlands, but his family could not afford it, so he instead studied at law at the Rechts Hogeschool, in Batavia (now Jakarta), earning a Meester in de Rechten (Mr.) degree in September 1939. During his studies in Batavia, Sjafruddin founded the Unitas Studiosorum Indonesiensis, a student organization which was sponsored by the Dutch authorities and tended to avoid engaging in politics, unlike the more radical Perhimpoenan Peladjar-Peladjar Indonesia (Indonesian Students' Association).

After graduating, he became an editor for the newspaper Soeara Timur ("Eastern Voice"), and from 1940 until 1941 he was the chairman of the Perserikatan Perkumpulan Radio Ketimuran ("Eastern Radio Association"). Sjafruddin, who had developed strong nationalist sentiments, rejected the moderate demands presented by the 1936 Soetardjo Petition (made by Soetardjo Kartohadikusumo, the sponsor of Soeara Timur), and in 1940 refused to join the Stadswacht, the Dutch colonial militia. He also founded a war relief effort organization, where he served as secretary until the Japanese occupation of the Dutch East Indies began in 1942. Despite his education in law and his general interest in literature, he took a job at the colonial finance department as a tax inspector's adjutant in Kediri, after a one-year job training. He retained this job during the Japanese occupation of 1942–1945, during which he was initially promoted to head of the Kediri tax office, and then relocated to Bandung. During the occupation, Sjafruddin became convinced that immediate Indonesian independence was necessary, and became active in the underground independence movement. He often visited Sutan Sjahrir, a key leader in the resistance against Japanese occupation, and according to Sjafruddin, he was often wrongly regarded as a member of Sjahrir's movement. Along with Mohammad Natsir, he discreetly organized a number of educational courses directed against the Japanese occupation.

== National revolution ==
=== Early national revolution ===
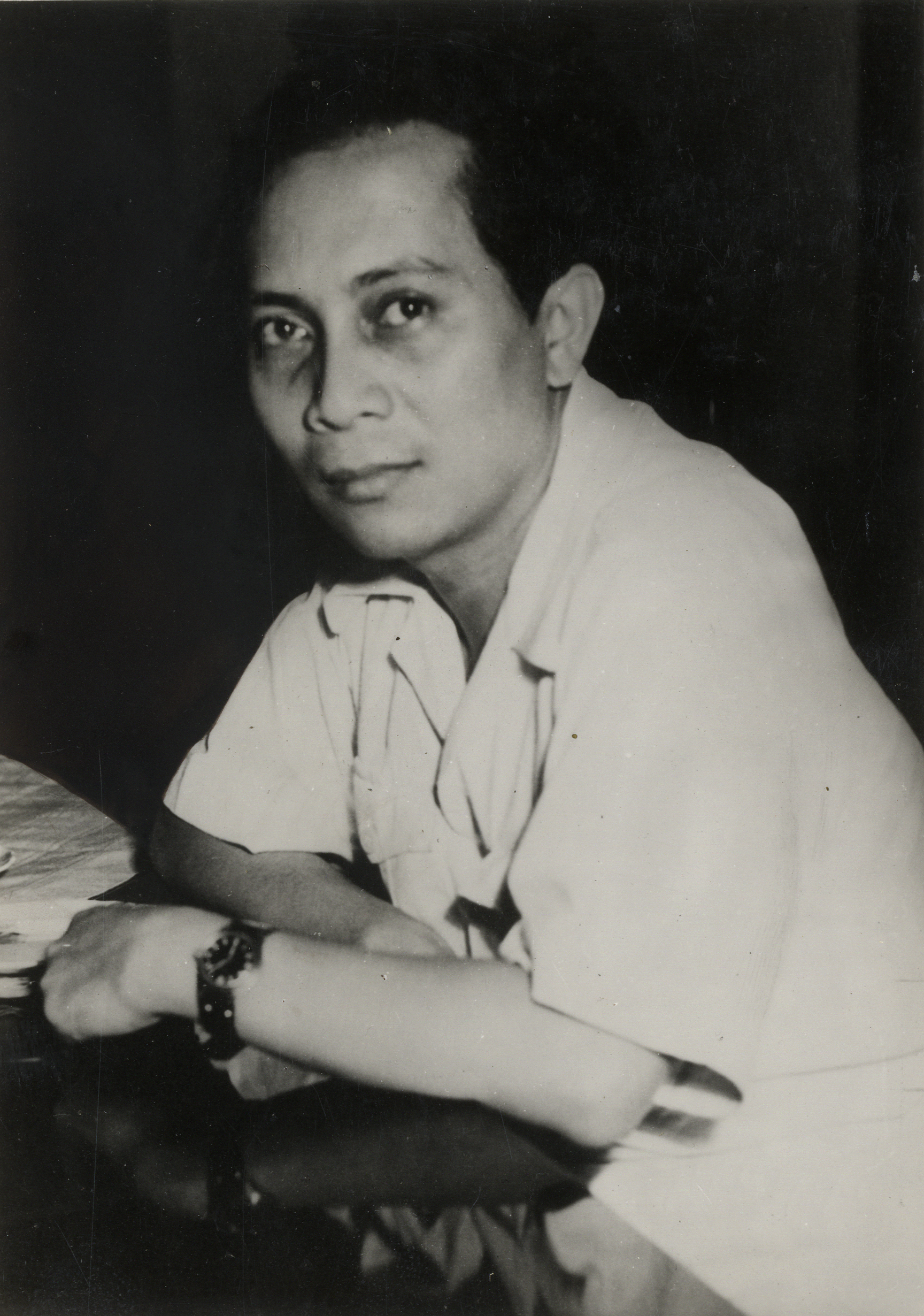
Prime Minister Sutan Sjahrir (1909–1966) who appointed Sjarifuddin to the position of Minister of Finance

Indonesian independence was proclaimed on 17 August 1945, with Sukarno being elected as President. On 24 August Sjafruddin became a member of the Indonesian National Committee of the Priangan region, before joining the Central Indonesian National Committee (KNIP) and becoming one of the members of its Working Committee. In 1946 he joined Masjumi, an Islamic party, despite previously having no experience within Islamic organizations; he later said that his religious affiliation led him to prefer Masyumi to Sjahrir's Socialist Party of Indonesia, despite his personal connection to Sjahrir. His closeness to Sjahrir led to his appointment as deputy minister of finance in Sjahrir's second cabinet from 12 March to 2 October 1946 and Minister of Finance for his third cabinet from 2 October to 27 June 1947, before his replacement by Alexander Andries Maramis.

He returned to a cabinet position as Minister of Prosperity under Mohammad Hatta's non-party cabinet starting from 29 January 1948. Sjahrir had offered Sjafruddin a post as Minister of Finance in Sjahrir's first cabinet, but Sjafruddin rejected the offer, citing his perceived inexperience. In a later interview, Sjafruddin remarked that once he became Junior Minister and saw how his preceding Minister of Finance Soerachman Tjokroadisurjo worked, he thought he "[could do the Finance Minister's duties] better than that". Early in the revolution, he emphasized the need for revolutionaries to maintain a pragmatic stance. In a newspaper article, he criticized the Pemuda (youth) groups for pressuring the government with excessive demands, supported Sjahrir's realpolitik approach and praised Vladimir Lenin and Joseph Stalin as "realists" in contrast to the groups. The article came as a response to revolutionary armed forces commander Sudirman's speech which espoused militancy and downplayed the lack of equipment of the Indonesian military. In the same writing, Sjafruddin denounced a number of leaders who called for pemuda to fight Allied forces with bamboo spears as "criminal".

Sjafruddin also persuaded Hatta of the need to issue the Oeang Republik Indonesia (ORI), the predecessor to the modern Indonesian rupiah, both to finance the Indonesian government during the revolution and to generate a degree of legitimacy to the international community. When Hatta hesitated, Sjafruddin remarked to him that "if [Hatta] was caught by the Dutch he would be hanged not as a forger but as a rebel". In late 1946, he was the first Indonesian finance minister to distribute the ORI, although the signatures were that of Alexander Andries Maramis, who had organized its printing the previous year. In 1947, he participated in the Economic Council for Asia and the Far East at Manila, where he learned of the international impression that the Indonesian revolutionaries were communists. Once he returned, he published a booklet Politik dan Revolusi Kita (Our Politics and Revolution) in mid-1948 which attempted to clarify the unusual coalition between Masyumi and the Indonesian Communist Party (PKI). He also called for political parties to define a policy to ensure that each party's members would follow a specific party line.

=== Emergency government ===
By 1948, the Renville Agreement had established a ceasefire between the Dutch forces and the Republic. However, as the Dutch had previously conducted an offensive against the Republicans despite the Linggadjati Agreement, Indonesian leaders began forming a contingency plan. Following the advice of lieutenant colonel Daan Jahja, who considered the Republican power base in Central Java to be too small and densely populated for an emergency center of power, Hatta (at that time both minister of defence and vice president) began relocating a number of military and civilian officers to Bukittinggi beginning in May 1948. Then, in November, he brought Sjafruddin to Bukittinggi, and they began preparing the groundwork for an emergency government. Hatta then had to return to Yogyakarta to participate in United Nations-sponsored negotiations with the Dutch, leaving Sjafruddin to form an emergency government should Yogyakarta and other Republican leaders fall into Dutch hands. By mid-December, there were plans to evacuate Hatta back to Bukittinggi in order to allow him to lead the emergency government. However, before Hatta could leave Java, the second Dutch offensive was launched on 19 December. The Indonesian government in Yogyakarta fell the same day, with both Sukarno and Hatta being captured and exiled to Bangka.

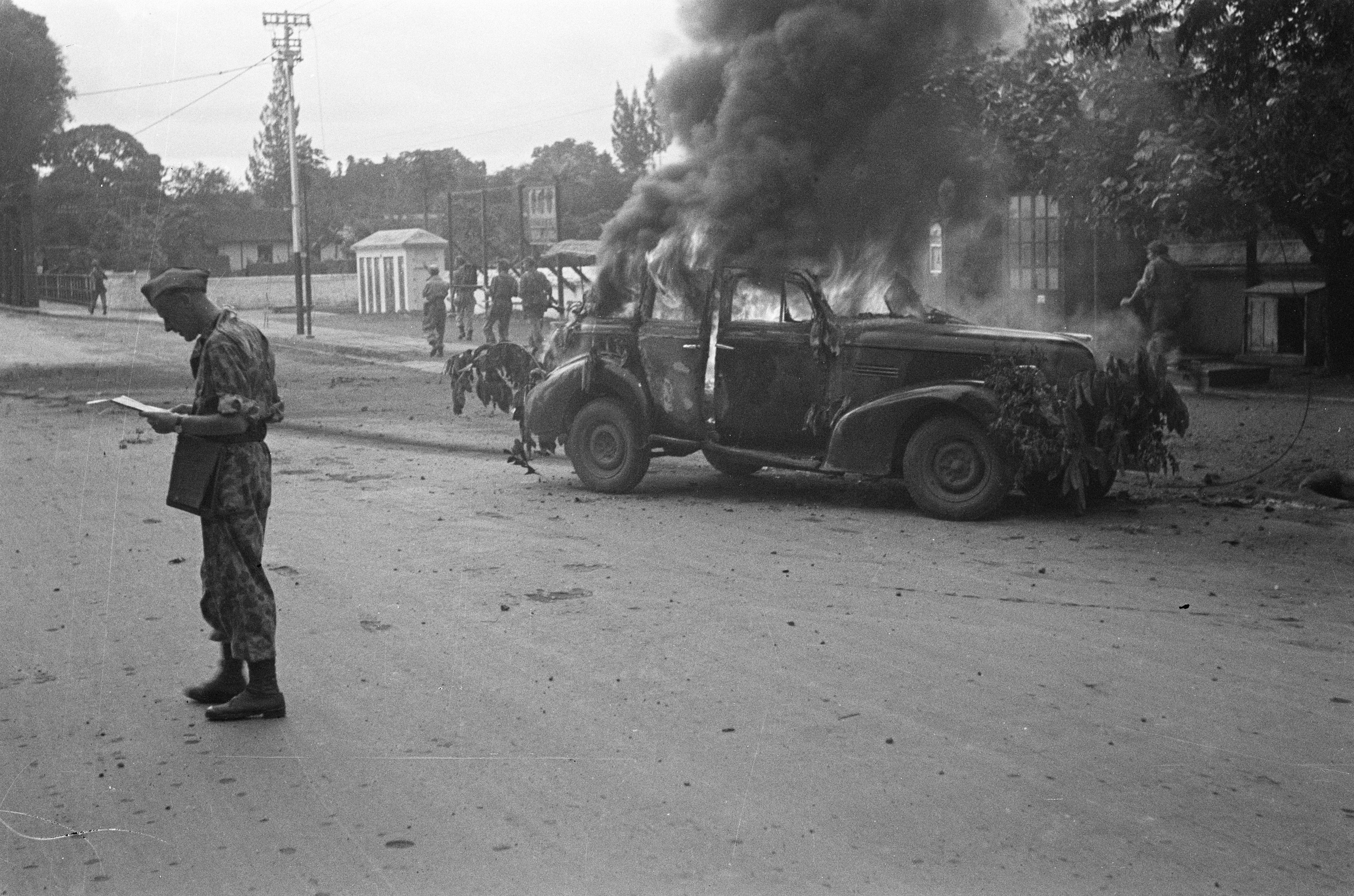
Dutch troops in Yogyakarta during Operation Kraai which saw the capture of both President Sukarno and Vice President Mohammad Hatta, 1948

After being informed of Yogyakarta's fall by Colonel Hidayat Martaatmadja, Sjafruddin was initially unable to believe that the Indonesian government would collapse so quickly and that both President Sukarno and Hatta had been captured. He was also initially uncertain of the authenticity of the news, and of his legal authority to form a government. (Note: While the Yogyakarta government had sent a message to Sjafruddin with an order to form a government, he never received it.) With the fall of Yogyakarta, Sjafruddin convened a meeting with local Republican officials such as Teuku Muhammad Hasan and Mohammad Nasroen, but their meeting was cut short by Dutch aircraft flying low over the city. In order to evade the Dutch attacking Bukittinggi, he retreated further inland, towards the town of Halaban, where he was joined by a number of Republican officials and military leaders. There he eventually announced the formation of the Emergency Government of the Republic of Indonesia (PDRI) on 22 December, with himself as head.

The PDRI further announced the formation of a commissariat in Java, which was to be headed by Republican leaders who had evaded capture such as Soekiman Wirjosandjojo and Ignatius Joseph Kasimo Hendrowahyono. As the leader of the emergency government, Sjafruddin was given a mandate to form a government in-exile by Sukarno, but opted to use the title "Head" instead of "President", as the mandate had not reached him by 22 December. In addition to Head of Government, the emergency cabinet also had Sjafruddin as the minister of defense, foreign affairs, (Note: Alexander Andries Maramis, who was located in India at the time, was later appointed foreign affairs minister.) and information. Still on 22 December, Dutch forces captured Bukittinggi and Payakumbuh, threatening the PDRI at Halaban and convincing them to withdraw further. Shortly after the pronouncement, Sjafruddin's group left Halaban, with the military leadership heading north towards Aceh. Sjafruddin and the civilian leadership had initially planned to move to Pekanbaru, but Dutch air attacks, difficult roads, and Dutch capture of a number of towns along the route compelled the group to briefly split up at Sungai Dareh, then regroup at the village of Bidar Alam, near Jambi. Sjafruddin arrived there on 9 January 1949, and the split groups caught up in the following weeks.

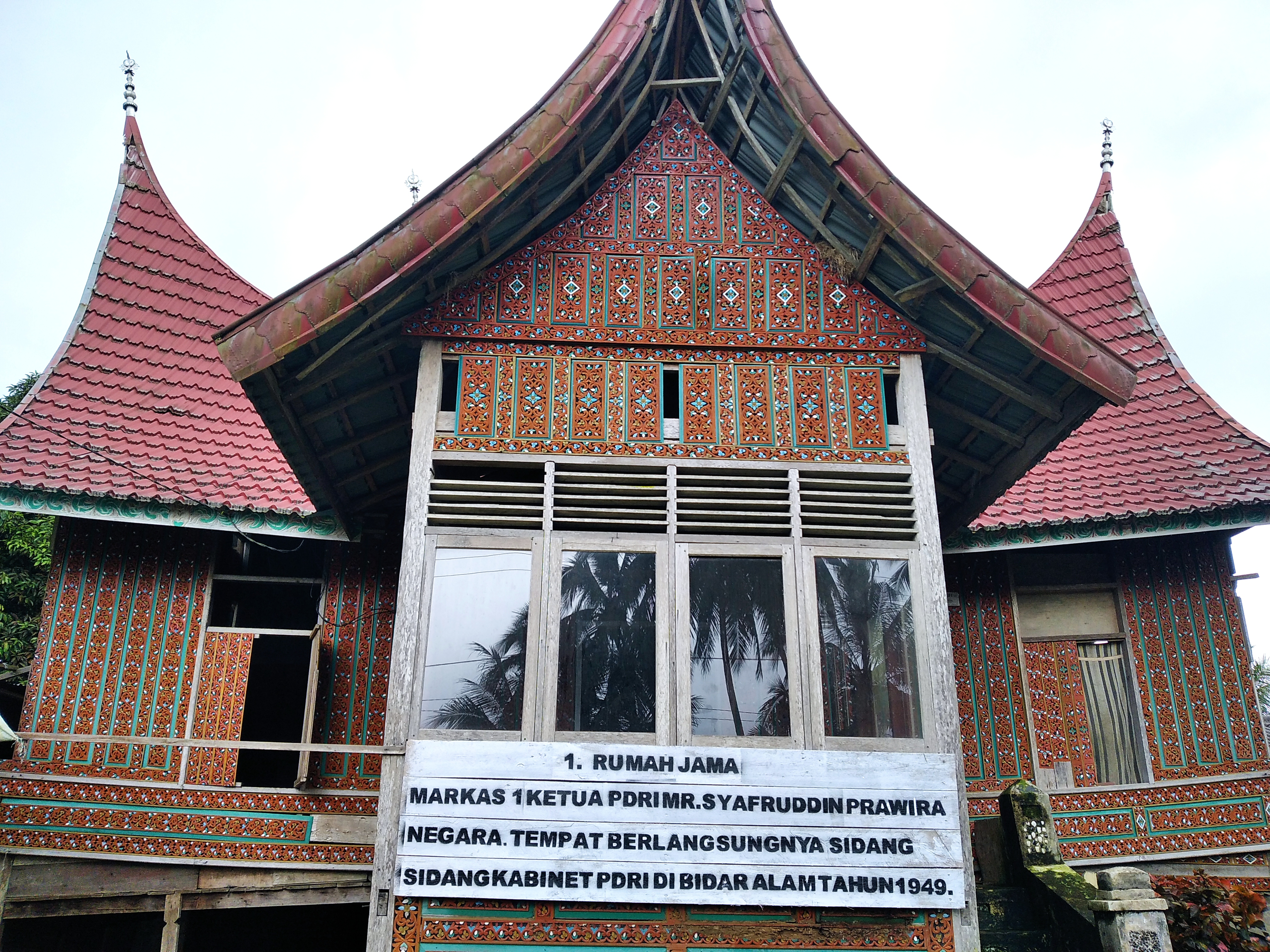
Sjafruddin's base during his time at the village of Bidar Alam.

While in Bidar Alam, he used a generator-powered radio transmitter of the Indonesian Air Force to maintain contact with both the international world (for example, congratulating Jawaharlal Nehru for his inauguration as Indian Prime Minister) and the scattered members of PDRI. In order to ensure continued supplies of food and military supplies for the guerrilla units still operating in Sumatra, Sjafruddin established a supply section, which controlled the Republican trade of agricultural products and opium to the Malay Peninsula. On one occasion on 14 January 1949, Sjafruddin and a large number of PDRI's civilian and military leaders attended a meeting at the village of Situjuh Batur. Sjafruddin left after the meeting, but a number of leaders (such as Chatib Sulaiman) stayed the night there and were killed in a Dutch ambush at dawn the next day. As the Republican forces led by Sudirman conducting guerrilla warfare in Java and Sumatra recognized Sjafruddin's PDRI as the legitimate Republican government, the PDRI gave the Indonesian fighters a unified authority during this critical time. The PDRI also stifled Dutch plans to present a lack of an Indonesian government as a fait accompli to the UN, with Sjafruddin giving instructions to the Indonesian delegation at the UN. This coordination, alongside Republican military successes, gave negotiators under Mohammad Roem a strong bargaining position.

The Dutch, frustrated with continued Indonesian resistance, eventually approached Sukarno and Hatta in order to negotiate, bypassing Sjafruddin's emergency government. This angered him, as he believed that Sukarno and Hatta had no legal authority at that time and that the PDRI should represent the legitimate government. Many leaders, including Sudirman, were also displeased as neither Sukarno nor Hatta consulted the PDRI leaders while negotiating the Roem–Van Roijen Agreement, and pressed Sjafruddin to reject it. Sjafruddin thought that the exiled Republican leaders in Bangka underestimated the strength of the PDRI. Sjafruddin was convinced to agree to the outcome of the agreement after some negotiations with Natsir, Johannes Leimena and Abdul Halim in Sjafruddin's hideout at the village of Padang Japang – Hatta had gone to meet Sjafruddin, but he went to Aceh as the captured Republican leaders initially thought that the PDRI was based there. Eventually, coming along with Natsir's delegation, Sjafruddin left his hideout, and returned to Java. In a speech before his departure, Sjafruddin indicated his misgivings with the agreement, but acknowledged the need of presenting a united Republican front. He returned his mandate to Sukarno in Yogyakarta on 13 July 1949.

== Political career ==
=== Deputy Prime Minister ===
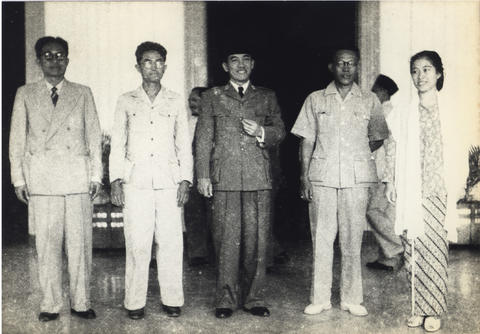
Sjafruddin (second from the right) and Sukarno (center) in Yogyakarta, shortly after Sjafruddin's return from Sumatra, c. June 1949

Following Sjafruddin's return to Yogyakarta, he was appointed as Deputy Prime Minister for Sumatra in the Second Hatta Cabinet, and was stationed at Kutaraja. He was given extensive powers in this position, since the Republican government had poor communications with Sumatra and only held tenuous control. During the PDRI period in 1949, Sjafruddin had been approached by Acehnese leaders, who requested that the region be split off into its own province. By May 1949, he had officially appointed Daud Beureu'eh as military governor of Aceh. In a visit to Aceh in August 1949, he faced significant pressure in order to form a province, to a point where a government statement later described that "the autonomous province of Aceh was created through force majeure". In December 1949, he released a decree which separated Aceh from North Sumatra to form its own province, but this decree was revoked by the central government under Mohammad Natsir's premiership. This caused significant anger amongst Acehnese leaders such as Daud Beureu'eh, and only successive visits by Sjafruddin, Assaat, Hatta, and finally Natsir himself calmed the situation. Additionally, Sjafruddin assured officials who had worked for the Dutch that the Republican government would not permit reprisals.

=== Minister of Finance ===
Within the Republic of the United States of Indonesia Cabinet led by Hatta, Sjafruddin returned to his previous office as Minister of Finance, a post which he would later retain in the succeeding Natsir Cabinet. While drafting a provisional constitution for the federal state, Sjafruddin argued unsuccessfully for the inclusion of a clause whereby Hatta would become Prime Minister in the event of a political deadlock. The proposal was accepted by Masyumi and several others, but could not pass and was eventually dropped in exchange for an implicit promise by Sukarno to do so instead of a formal clause. In the Masyumi-heavy cabinets between December 1949 and the end of the Wilopo Cabinet in June 1953, Sjafruddin's economic views and outlook enjoyed significant influence in the government, with Sjafruddin being Masyumi's primary economic policymaker. One of Sjarifuddin's programs was a foreign exchange certificate system, which required certificates obtainable from exporting goods in order to engage in imports.

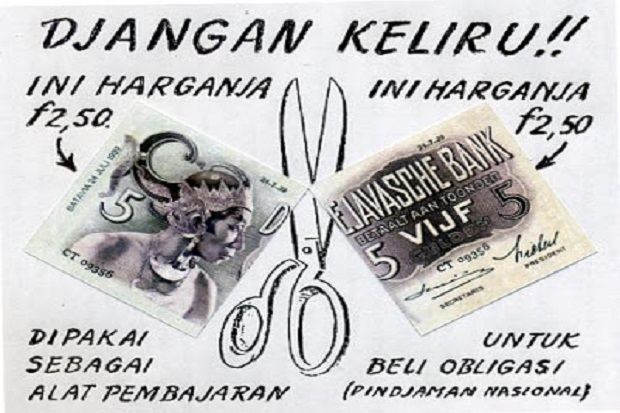
A caricature illustrating the Sjafruddin Cut policy, 1950

Additionally, as a result of the Dutch–Indonesian Round Table Conference, the Indonesian government was saddled with heavy debts and obligations, and the economy was plagued with heavy inflation due to a shortage of goods and an oversupply of currency. By 1950, there were three currencies circulating – one issued by the Republican government, one issued by the Netherlands Indies Civil Administration (NICA), and the other issued by the Bank of Java before the Japanese occupation. In order to reduce the money supply, Sjafruddin announced on 10 March 1950 that all NICA and Bank of Java notes with a face value above 5 guilders were to be physically cut in half – a policy known as the "Sjafruddin Cut" (Gunting Sjafruddin). The left halves of the notes remained legal tender until 9 April, with a nominal value of half its face value, and were to be exchanged with new notes, while the right halves were exchanged with 30-year government bonds yielding 3 percent.

The same "cut" also applied to bank accounts, with half of all bank account values (excepting an amount of 200 guilders for accounts with less than 1,000 guilders) being transferred into a government loan account. According to Sjafruddin in a later interview, beyond reining in inflation, this also served to create uniform legal tender for the whole country and remove unwanted Dutch currency from circulation. The Bank of Java claimed that the policy reduced the money supply by 41 percent, and that the prices of food and textiles still rose in 1950 after the execution of the Sjafruddin Cut. Both the foreign exchange certificate system and the Sjafruddin Cut invited significant criticism from the political opposition. This was especially the case with the cut, which was constantly attacked by PKI. It also caused controversy due to the dating of the order, which happened at the end of the month, when most salaried workers still held cash.

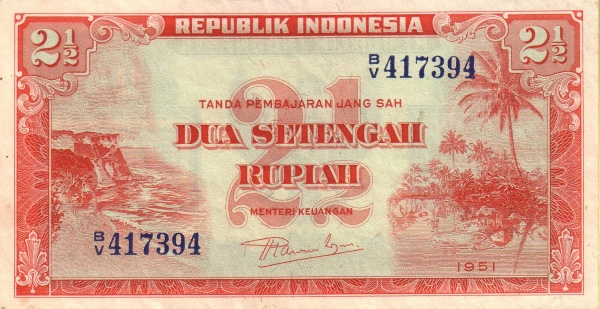
A 2½ rupiah banknote from 1951, bearing Sjafruddin's signature

Government income increased during Sjafruddin's early tenure, but expenses also rose, and he failed to close the government deficit. Indonesian government finances later improved during the Natsir era due to a boom caused by the Korean War, resulting in a budget surplus. In this period, the "Economic Urgency Plan" was devised by minister of trade and industry Sumitro Djojohadikusumo, against Sjafruddin's opposition, to develop import substitution industries and restrict some industries to native Indonesian entrepreneurs. Despite the improving financial situation, Sjafruddin maintained strict budgetary controls by retaining an unpopular colonial-era tax, refusing to raise salaries of civil servants, and rejecting calls to provide funding to political parties. His unpopularity was compounded by the retention of a number of Dutch officials who held significant powers within the finance ministry.

After Sjafruddin's tenure ended, he was replaced by fellow Masyumi member Jusuf Wibisono in the Sukiman Cabinet. He was a critic of the cabinet's economic policies, writing in a June 1951 pamphlet that economic decline from the government's policies was "only temporarily hidden by the pseudo-welfare of high export prices". During 1951, the Indonesian government had been negotiating war reparations with the Japanese government as part of the Treaty of San Francisco. The government of Sukiman had intended to sign the multilateral agreement in order to improve relations with the United States and the democratic camp of the Cold War on top of receiving reparations and economic benefits. While Wibisono supported the position, Sjafruddin and Natsir opposed it: Sjafruddin argued that a bilateral agreement would suffice as Indonesia had never been formally at war with Japan and could receive economic benefits and reparations without signing the treaty. Despite the opposition, after heated discussions, Sukiman's position prevailed. In 1952, Masyumi split between modernist and traditional politicians, the party remaining under modernist politicians such as Sjafruddin and Natsir, while more traditional Islamist members broke off and merged into Nahdlatul Ulama (NU).

=== Bank Indonesia governor ===
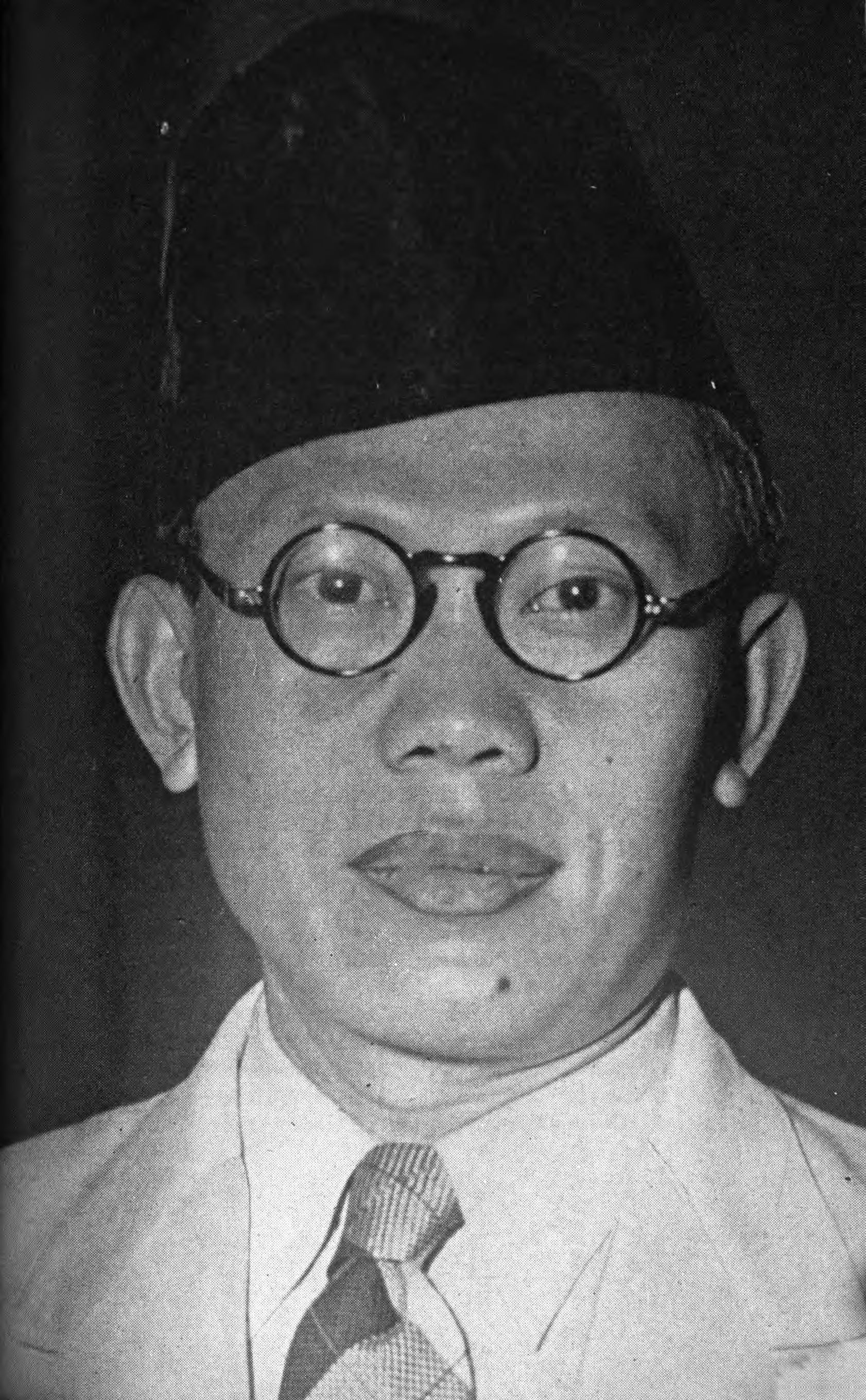
Portrait of Sjafruddin, c. 1952

On 30 April 1951, the Indonesian government nationalized the Bank of Java, and converted it from a joint-stock company into a public body. Sjafruddin opposed this on the grounds that the bank's Indonesian personnel were too inexperienced to manage it. Despite this, on 15 July he was appointed as the inaugural governor of the central bank, later renamed Bank Indonesia (BI), to replace the previous resigning governor A. Houwink. Sjafruddin was initially reluctant to take up the post, having planned to retire from public life and enter the private sector to earn enough for his children's education. As he did not want to earn money through abuse of office, he accepted the post under the condition that his salary and that of other Indonesian employees in the bank would be the same as that of the Dutch staff.

Sjafruddin's economic and monetary policy views, such as his opposition to the nationalization of the bank, were similar to the views of the outgoing Dutch administrators, and according to Sjafruddin, Houwink approved of his appointment. In BI's first annual report, Sjafruddin argued for the bank to continue commercial banking activities, citing a shortage of access to banking systems and the lack of a capital market in Indonesia at that time. In designing BI's statutes, Sjafruddin included a clause which would manage the bank's reserves of gold and foreign currency at 20 percent of currency issued. This was criticized by contemporary economists, most prominently Sumitro who had been appointed the new Finance Minister.

While in office, Sjafruddin criticized the Indonesian government's lack of clarity on the distinction between "domestic" and "foreign" capital. Sjafruddin was of the opinion that the distinction between the two lay in whether profits were remitted abroad or not – in other words, that Chinese Indonesian entrepreneurs would be "domestic". This was in contrast to positive discrimination policies for indigenous Indonesians favored by Sumitro. During the Ali Sastroamidjojo premiership between 1953 and 1955, Sjafruddin was also a prominent critic of the government's economic and monetary policies. In 1956, approaching the end of Sjafruddin's first term as governor, the Indonesian National Party (PNI) proposed to replace him with PNI member, BI deputy governor and former PDRI minister Lukman Hakim, with whom Sjafruddin had a close relationship. Sjafruddin maintained his post after NU opted to back his second term, aided by favours given to NU-related businesses by fellow Masyumi member and sitting finance minister Wibisono.

== PRRI rebellion ==
=== Prelude ===
By late 1957, the Indonesian economic and political situation had deteriorated, and Dutch firms were often blamed for the malaise. Public opinion was firmly against Sjafruddin's policy of accommodating foreign capital. Anti-Dutch sentiments rose significantly following Dutch success in blocking the West New Guinea dispute from being discussed at the United Nations General Assembly on 29 November, and immediately afterwards Sukarno ordered labor unions and army units to take over Dutch businesses. Sjafruddin and other Masyumi leaders were investigated for possible links with an assassination attempt on Sukarno on 30 November in Cikini as some of the assailants were members of Masyumi's youth wing. Despite this, Sjafruddin remained openly critical of the takeovers and the lack of a clear plan on how they would be executed, believing that Indonesians needed further training in order to acquire the skills needed to run the nationalized companies. Throughout December 1957, Masyumi leaders Sjafruddin, Natsir, and Burhanuddin Harahap were subjected to accusations by the media of being complicit in the assassination attempt, and they were harassed by phone calls and by paramilitary groups affiliated with PNI and PKI. They all opted to depart Jakarta for their own and their families' safety, and by January 1958 Sjafruddin was in Padang.

While on the way there, he and other Masyumi leaders (and Sumitro, who had left Jakarta after being accused of corruption) attended a meeting with a number of dissident officers such as Maludin Simbolon. Following debates (the military commanders allegedly wanted to declare Sumatra's independence, which the civilian leaders opposed), the group released a statement which called the Djuanda Cabinet unconstitutional, and called for a cabinet led by Hatta and the Sultan of Yogyakarta Hamengkubuwono IX to be formed. Sjafruddin also went to Palembang and held discussions with the potential dissident Colonel Barlian, who was the regional commander of the armed forces in South Sumatra. Barlian refused to commit his forces to support a potential rebellion. Sjafruddin also wrote an open letter to Sukarno, which voiced his opposition to the "fascist" Guided Democracy and called for a return to the 1945 Constitution. While Natsir and Harahap claimed to have specific reasons to be in Sumatra, Sjafruddin openly admitted to having fled Jakarta, writing another open letter to Sukarno on 23 January, saying that "he was not ready to die stupidly". On 1 February, Sjafruddin was removed from his office as Bank Indonesia governor by Presidential Order, and he was replaced by Lukman Hakim.

=== Rebellion ===
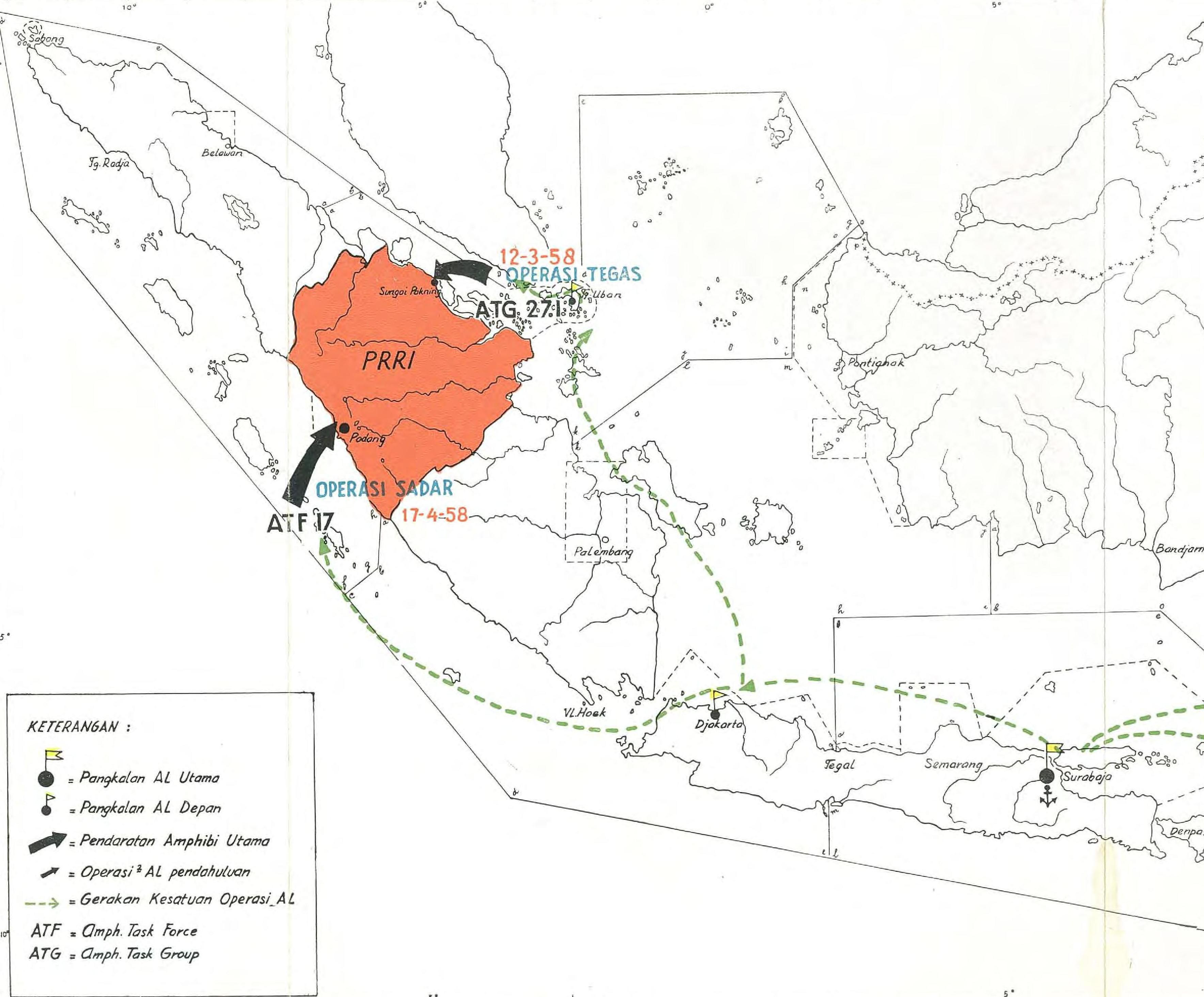
Indonesian Navy military operations against PRRI in 1958

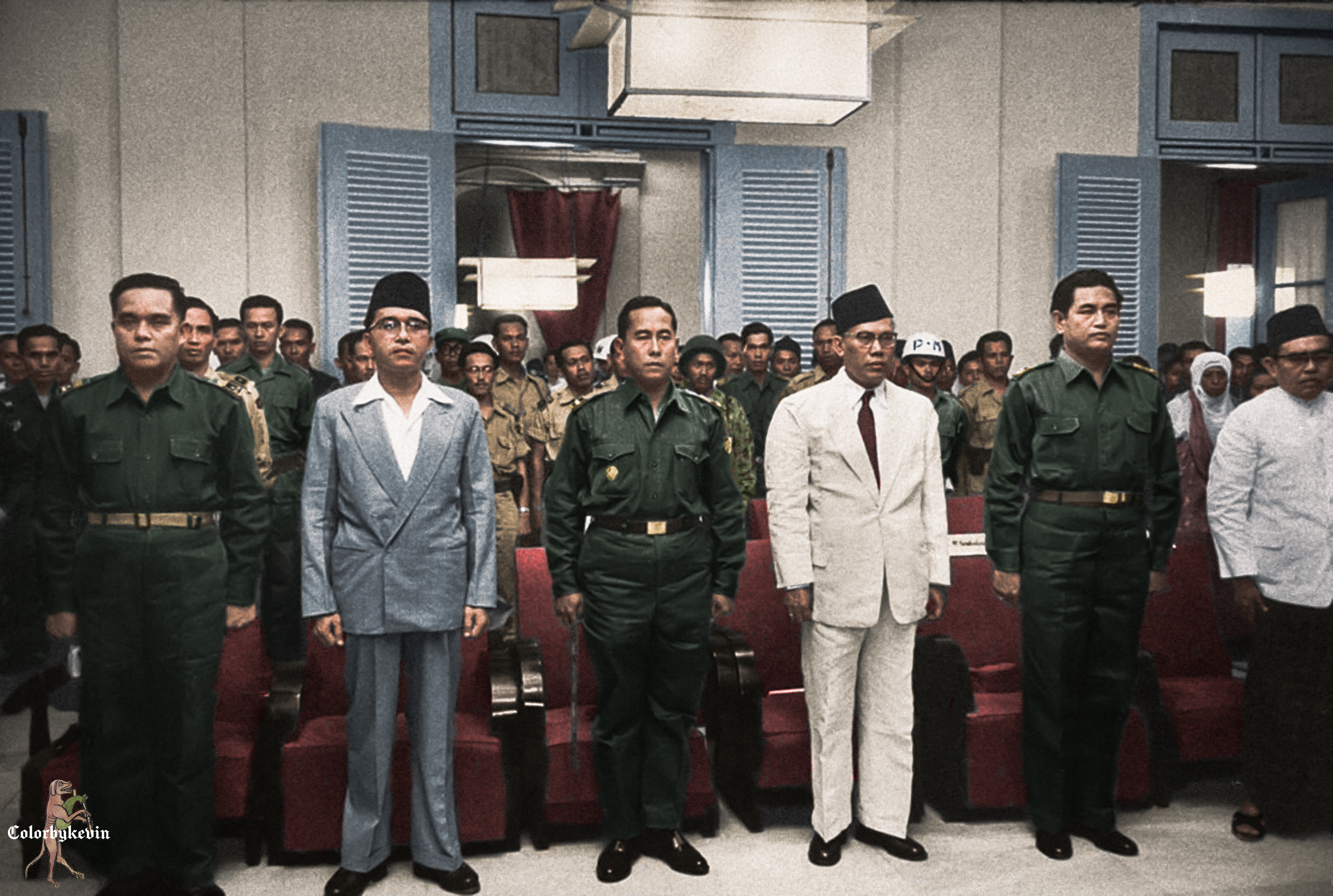
Sjafruddin (third from right) with other PRRI members

On 15 February 1958, the Revolutionary Government of the Republic of Indonesia (PRRI) was declared in Padang by Lt. Col Ahmad Husein, with Sjafruddin being named as both its prime minister and finance minister. According to Sjafruddin in his later autobiography, he refused Husein's request that he sign the declaration which proclaimed PRRI, in order to emphasize that PRRI's formation was not his initiative. Sjafruddin had previously attempted to convince the military officers to exercise restraint and avoid a civil war, but he eventually agreed to take part in PRRI. The Indonesian government under prime minister Djuanda Kartawidjaja issued an order to arrest Sjafruddin and the other civilian leaders the following day, and within a week aerial attacks were launched against cities in West Sumatra. By April, government forces had landed in Padang and secured it with little to no resistance. Once he learned of PRRI's military collapse, Sjafruddin vowed in anger to "stay here in the jungle" and adding that "it won't be the first time". By 5 May, PRRI's capital at Bukittinggi had been captured by the Indonesian government.

Within four months, the government had completely defeated PRRI militarily. PRRI's leaders had failed to gain significant popular support for the movement, and while it initially received some backing from the United States, military aid was soon withdrawn. (Note: At that time, parts of the United States Seventh Fleet and the 3rd Marine Division were posted off the coast of Sumatra. The US State Department under John Foster Dulles had expected a wider insurrection, but was disappointed by the limited extent of the rebellion and the poor military performance of PRRI.) By the middle of 1958, the group had been forced into a low-intensity guerrilla warfare based in the jungles of Sumatra. Despite continued defeats, Sjafruddin still refused to attempt a compromise with the Jakarta government. On the first anniversary of PRRI, he gave a speech attacking Sukarno for working with communists, and urging a federal state. In a last-ditch political attempt, the Masyumi leadership and the dissident military leaders announced the "United Republic of Indonesia" at Bonjol on 8 February 1960. In the proclamation, Sjafruddin was named president of the Republic, but little else beyond the state's constitution was announced. The declaration did not amount to much, and the Indonesian government continued to pressure PRRI, capturing rebel-held towns in Sumatra's highlands. By July, the rebel stronghold at Koto Tinggi where Sjafruddin and the other Masyumi/PRRI leaders resided had been captured, forcing them to flee and disabling their capacity to lead the rebellion.

Army Chief of Staff Abdul Haris Nasution, in order to further split the government of PRRI, announced an amnesty program for rebelling troops in late 1960. In April and May 1961, they began surrendering to the government, although PRRI still controlled much of the rural regions of West Sumatra. Sjafruddin and Natsir appointed Maludin Simbolon to represent PRRI in negotiating with the central government, but the military leaders opted to surrender separately. Between June and 17 August, nearly all of PRRI's troops and military commanders surrendered, leaving the civilian leaders few options. Sjafruddin himself had been negotiating with Nasution since July, and alongside Assaat and Burhanuddin Harahap he submitted to military authorities near Padangsidimpuan on 25 August. He did so after advising his own remaining followers to "cease hostilities" in a radio broadcast on 17 August. Sjafruddin also surrendered PRRI's assets in form of 29 kilograms (64 lb) of gold bullion. This left only Natsir and Colonel Dahlan Djambek as PRRI's remaining leadership, and after Djambek's death on 13 September, Natsir too surrendered on 25 September, ending PRRI's rebellion. Sjafruddin was initially not imprisoned, due to a 1961 declaration of amnesty for PRRI members by Sukarno, and for a time he stayed around Medan. However, in March 1962, he was brought to Jakarta, and then held as a prisoner in Kedu for two years before being transferred to a military prison in Jakarta in 1964. After the fall of Sukarno and the advent of Suharto's New Order, Masyumi leaders were released from prison between 1965 and 1967. Sjafruddin himself was released on 26 July 1966.

== Post-rebellion ==
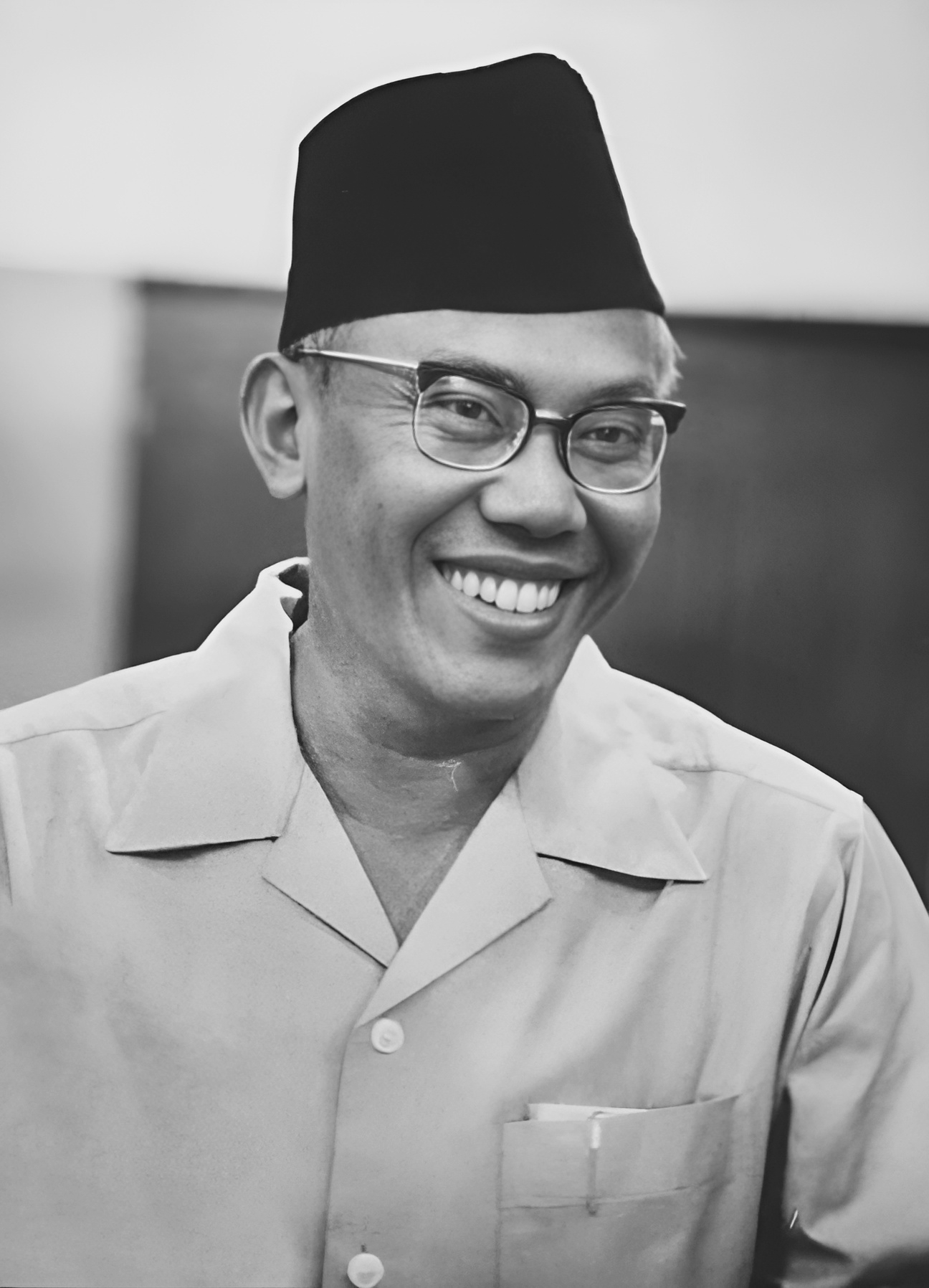
Sjafruddin, pictured in the 1960s

Shortly before Sjafruddin's release, other Masyumi leaders released earlier had attempted to rehabilitate the party, but the Indonesian Army had forbidden the rehabilitation of both Masyumi and the Socialist Party of Indonesia. Disillusioned, Sjafruddin left active politics and tended to express himself more through religious organizations such as the Indonesian Pesantren Foundation and the Mubaligh Corps. He also maintained an interest in economics, founding the Indonesian Association of Muslim Businessmen in July 1967, and he generally supported the economic policies of the technocrats under Suharto such as Widjojo Nitisastro and Mohammad Sadli. He then used Friday sermons in mosques to preach against corruption under Suharto. He opposed the government monopoly on hajj pilgrimages, considering it inefficient and prone to fraud and corruption. In 1970, he founded a hajj association, which facilitated pilgrims who wanted to build up savings to go to Mecca outside the official government route. While successful for a time, financial mismanagement resulted in around 300 pilgrims being abandoned in Mecca in 1976 and requiring an intervention from the government. He also opposed the government-backed Parmusi and the newly formed Islamic parties, comparing them unfavorably with PKI. (Note: Quoted from Sjafruddin in a 1971 interview: "The present Islamic parties are as bad as the communists. No, that is not right, for the communists are willing to make sacrifices.") Due to his vocal criticism of the Suharto government, he was detained for a short period in April 1978.

In 1980, he became a member of the "Petition of Fifty" opposition group, alongside former PRRI colleagues Natsir and Harahap and retired generals such as Nasution, Ali Sadikin, and Hoegeng Iman Santoso. The petition questioned the conduct of the Indonesian National Armed Forces, its collaboration with Golkar, Suharto's accumulation of wealth, and his use of Pancasila, Indonesia's foundational philosophical theory, as a political weapon. Between 1974 and 1982, Pancasila had been pushed as the sole guiding principle for all groups in Indonesia, including religious ones. Sjafruddin was not opposed to Pancasila in itself, and accepted it as a founding principle for the state and constitution, but could not accept its extension as the basis of all social and political organizations. On 7 July 1983 he wrote a widely circulated open letter to Suharto protesting the provision in the draft law that endorsed the concept. In the letter, he made an argument based around Sukarno's 1945 speech at the creation of Pancasila, which had emphasized a nation based on gotong-royong (mutual assistance). Sjafruddin viewed this statement as an argument allowing the participants of the state to maintain their own unique identities – and that Pancasila's universal enforcement would eliminate the diversity. Following the 1984 Tanjung Priok riots and massacre, he was one of the authors and signatories of a "white paper" which attributed the riots to government policy, especially the increased use of Pancasila as a political tool. Due to these activities, Suharto banned Sjafruddin from leaving the country except for medical treatment. Still, he continued to criticize the government – for example, he was investigated in June 1985 due to a sermon he gave at a mosque in Tanjung Priok.

== Political views ==
Indonesian economist Thee Kian Wie described Sjafruddin as a pragmatic policymaker along with several contemporaries such as Sumitro and Hatta, although compared to such contemporaries Sjafruddin's policies and views were considered more accommodating. In a 1948 pamphlet, he espoused "Religious Socialism", which promoted a liberal free market economy and reserved nationalization for a later-stage, more developed economy. While not opposing nationalization altogether, Sjafruddin argued for a more gradual process of nationalization, arguing that foreign capital was advantageous for the country's economy and that rejecting it would be counterproductive. His reluctance on nationalization was associated with his Islamic views upholding the sanctity of individual property.

This resulted in a number of disagreements and public debates between him and the more nationalistic Sumitro, mostly in the Dutch-language newspaper Nieuwsgier during 1952. Unlike Sumitro, who endorsed state intervention to develop an industrial base, Sjafruddin doubted that state-owned enterprises would be efficient or productive. In the public debates, the two also had disagreements on development policy, with Sumitro attacking Sjafruddin's policies of prioritizing agrarian development and accumulation of fiscal reserves. Sjafruddin's reasoning was that the fiscal surpluses of the early 1950s were temporary, and therefore the fiscal reserves should be spent on expanding national productive capacity instead of a general monetary injection into the economy, and regarding agrarian development, Sjafruddin viewed the needed investment to improve national food security as much lower than that of industrialization. On the other hand, Sjafruddin attacked Sumitro's Benteng program, which he claimed forced industrialization before the Indonesian people could acquire the needed management and technological skills needed. Both Sjaruddin and Sumitro did agree on the necessity of maintaining foreign capital and attracting investments, unlike many in Indonesia at the time.

While agreeing with communists on the necessity of social justice and praising them for successful attempts in Europe to improve working conditions, Sjafruddin was fundamentally opposed to Marxism due to its atheism. In his writings, Sjafruddin insisted that no Muslim or Christian could be a true communist. He believed that many Muslims had joined together with the communists due to a misunderstanding of communism, and also considered Marxism to be contrary to the Constitution of Indonesia. Still, following liberal modernist Islam, he also argued that modern Muslims should be allowed to diverge from Muhammad on worldly issues, and hence Sjafruddin disagreed with the interpretation of bank interest as riba. His theological interpretations were generally based on the Quran over the actions of Muhammad which he considered to be bound to a certain place and time. He also often disagreed with various fatwā – such as when he supported Suharto's family planning program. Sjafruddin also strongly argued against a Pakistan-like Islamic state, considering it as imposing Islam on other Indonesians.

== Personal life ==
Sjafruddin married Tengku Halimah, daughter of the district chief of Buahbatu and a descendant of a King of Pagaruyung, whom he had met in Bandung, on 31 January 1941. The couple had eight children. During the PDRI months, his family remained in Yogyakarta under protection of Hamengkubuwono IX, while during the PRRI period they followed Sjafruddin to West Sumatra. His 1950s biography described Sjafruddin as "unskilled in sweet-talk", but noted he was "funny and has a lot of humor". He had a limited grasp of Arabic, which he learned in the 1950s. During Sjafruddin's imprisonment after his PRRI involvement, his family was homeless for a time due to the seizure of their house. For some time, they stayed at the homes of family and friendly Masyumi politicians, and one of his children could only enroll at a Catholic school thanks to I. J. Kasimo's intervention. Eventually, once Deputy Prime Ministers Leimena and Soebandrio became aware of his family's situation, their home was returned and Leimena provided the family with basic needs. When Sukarno also learned of the family's problems, he arranged for a businessman to give the family two cars.

== Death and legacy ==
The twin towers of the Bank Indonesia office, named after Sjafruddin and Radius Prawiro

Sjafruddin died in Jakarta of a heart attack on 15 February 1989. Suffering from bronchitis, at around 6 pm that day he had collapsed in his home and was rushed to Pondok Indah Hospital. He was buried in a simple grave at Tanah Kusir Cemetery in South Jakarta. In the years preceding his death, he had grown frailer, and in a December 1988 letter to George McTurnan Kahin after Hamengkubuwono IX's death he wrote "I was more than ever aware that the time is nearing that the Angel of Death will fetch me and join me with all other friends and comrades in arms who have preceded us."

In Sjafruddin's obituary, Kahin wrote that Sjafruddin was "never tainted by corruption" and had a "reputation for honesty, forthrightness, and solid integrity". Journalist Rosihan Anwar called him an idealist, who despite his Muslim background had a strong socialist ideal close to that of Sjahrir. Anwar also quoted Sjafruddin as saying, shortly prior to his death, that Indonesia was being colonized by itself. In Anwar's commentary, he remarked that Sjafruddin had been largely ignored by the Indonesian people and government after his fall from power, despite Sjafruddin's efforts in the national struggle.

Sjafruddin was made a National Hero of Indonesia on 8 November 2011 by President Susilo Bambang Yudhoyono, after the proposal to make him one was rejected twice due to Sjafruddin's PRRI involvement, and historians had to provide evidence to government officials that it was not a rebellion against the country. Indonesian Army officials were particularly against Sjafruddin's appointment as a National Hero, but as Natsir had also received the title in 2008, politicians from Islamic political parties – including several governors and high officials – organized seminars and book launchings supporting Sjafruddin's bid throughout 2011. This included a biographical novel around Prawiranegara's life by Akmal Nasery Basral, Presiden Prawiranegara. These actions led to Yudhoyono's approval of the honor. One of the two buildings that comprise Bank Indonesia's headquarters is named after Sjafruddin. A number of modern political figures, such as MPR speaker Zulkifli Hasan, deputy speaker Lukman Hakim Saifuddin and Constitutional Court Chief Justice Jimly Asshiddiqie, have argued for the formal recognition of Sjafruddin as Indonesia's second president.

== Notes ==
Political offices
Preceded by Lukman Hakim	Minister of Finance; 1949–1951	Succeeded by Jusuf Wibisono
Preceded by Adenan Kapau Gani; Setyadjit Soegondo; Raden Sjamsoeddin; Wondoamiseno	Deputy Prime Minister of Indonesia; 1949–1949	Succeeded by Abdul Hakim Harahap
Preceded by Sukarno (as President)	Chairman of the Emergency Government of the Republic of Indonesia; Also as Minister of Finance and Information; 1948–1949	Succeeded by Sukarno (as President)
Preceded by Adnan Kapau Gani	Minister of Welfare; 1948–1948	Succeeded by I. J. Kasimo
Preceded by Surachman Tjokroadisurjo	Minister of Finance; 1946–1947	Succeeded by A. A. Maramis
New title	Vice Minister of Finance; 1946–1946	Succeeded by Lukman Hakim
Government offices
New title	Governor of Bank Indonesia; 1953–1958	Succeeded by Lukman Hakim
