= Emergency Government of the Republic of Indonesia =

1948–49 government during the National Revolution

- Pemerintahan Darurat Republik Indonesia
- Central government
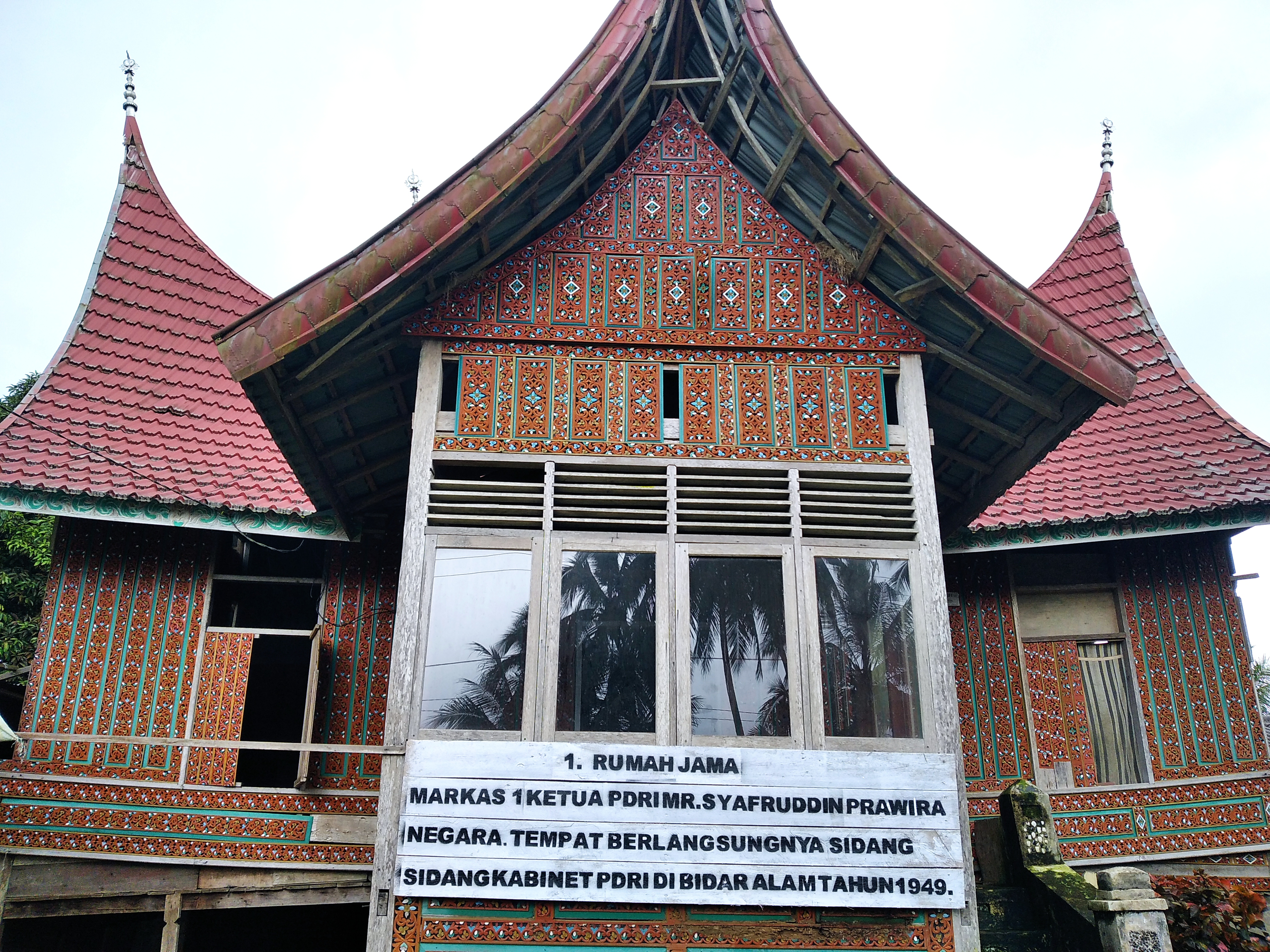
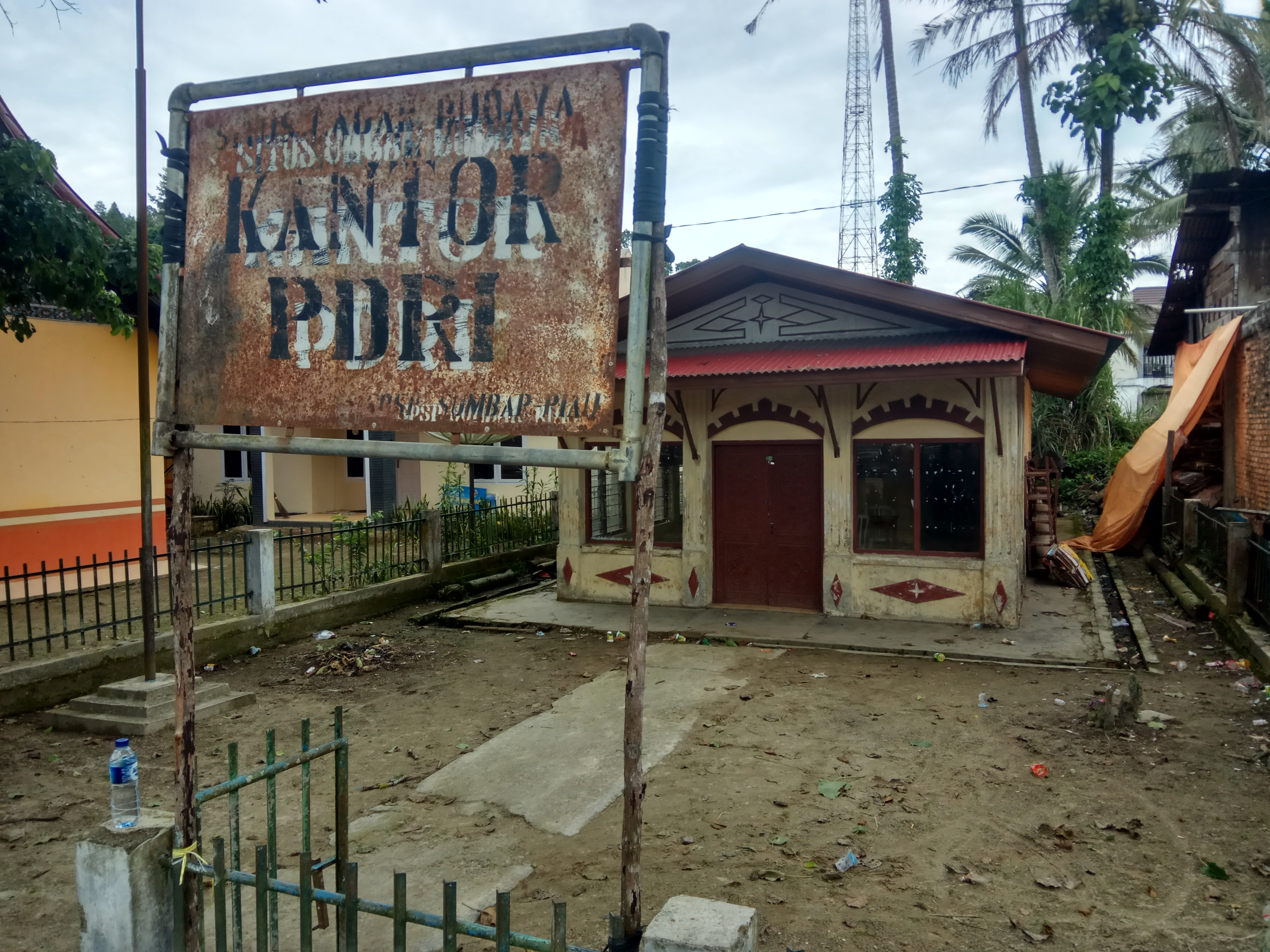
- Top: PDRI headquarter in Bidar Alam; Bottom: PDRI headquarters in Koto Tinggi, Lima Puluh Kota Regency

Overview
- Established: 22 December 1948
- Dissolved: 13 July 1949
- Country: Indonesia
- Leader: Chairman
- Leader Name: Sjafruddin Prawiranegara
- Appointed by: President
- Main organ: Sjafruddin Emergency Cabinet
- Ministries: 11
- Responsible to: Government of Indonesia
- Headquarters: Bukittinggi; Bidar Alam; Koto Tinggi

The Emergency Government of the Republic of Indonesia (Indonesian: Pemerintahan Darurat Republik Indonesia, PDRI) was established by Indonesian Republicans after the Netherlands occupied the at the time capital city of Yogyakarta in Central Java, the location of the temporary Republican capital during the Indonesian National Revolution. It was established in the city of Bukittinggi and led by Sjafruddin Prawiranegara.

The Republic of Indonesia's Strategy Council had prepared an emergency plan to create a "government-in-exile" in Sumatra or overseas. Sjafruddin, the Minister of Welfare, went to Bukittinggi in preparation for this emergency plan. Before being captured by the Dutch, President Sukarno sent a telegraph message to Sjafruddin in Bukittinggi giving him a mandate to create a "Republic of Indonesia government in exile" but this was not received until 1949. A similar telegraph was sent to A.A. Maramis, Indonesian Minister of Finance in New Delhi, India. Based on the emergency plan, after the Dutch invasion, on 22 December 1948, Sjafruddin established a 'government in exile' called the 'Emergency Government of the Republic of Indonesia' (PDRI) in Bukittinggi, Sumatra. Sjafruddin served as chairman of the emergency cabinet. The leaders of the PDRI moved around West Sumatra in an effort to evade arrest by the Dutch who wanted to abolish the PDRI. In early 1949, the PDRI government contacted the leaders of Indonesian forces in Java and the six Republic of Indonesia government ministers in Java who had escaped arrest.

According to the Roem–Van Roijen Agreement, on 13 July 1949 Dutch troops were to be pulled out from Republic of Indonesia regions and the Republic of Indonesia leaders were to be freed. The PDRI would therefore no longer be required. Sjafruddin then disbanded the PDRI and returned the mandate to President Sukarno.

== See also ==
- Indonesian National Revolution
