= Operation Kraai =

1948–49 Dutch military offensive in Indonesia during the National Revolution

- Part of the Police Actions of the Indonesian National Revolution
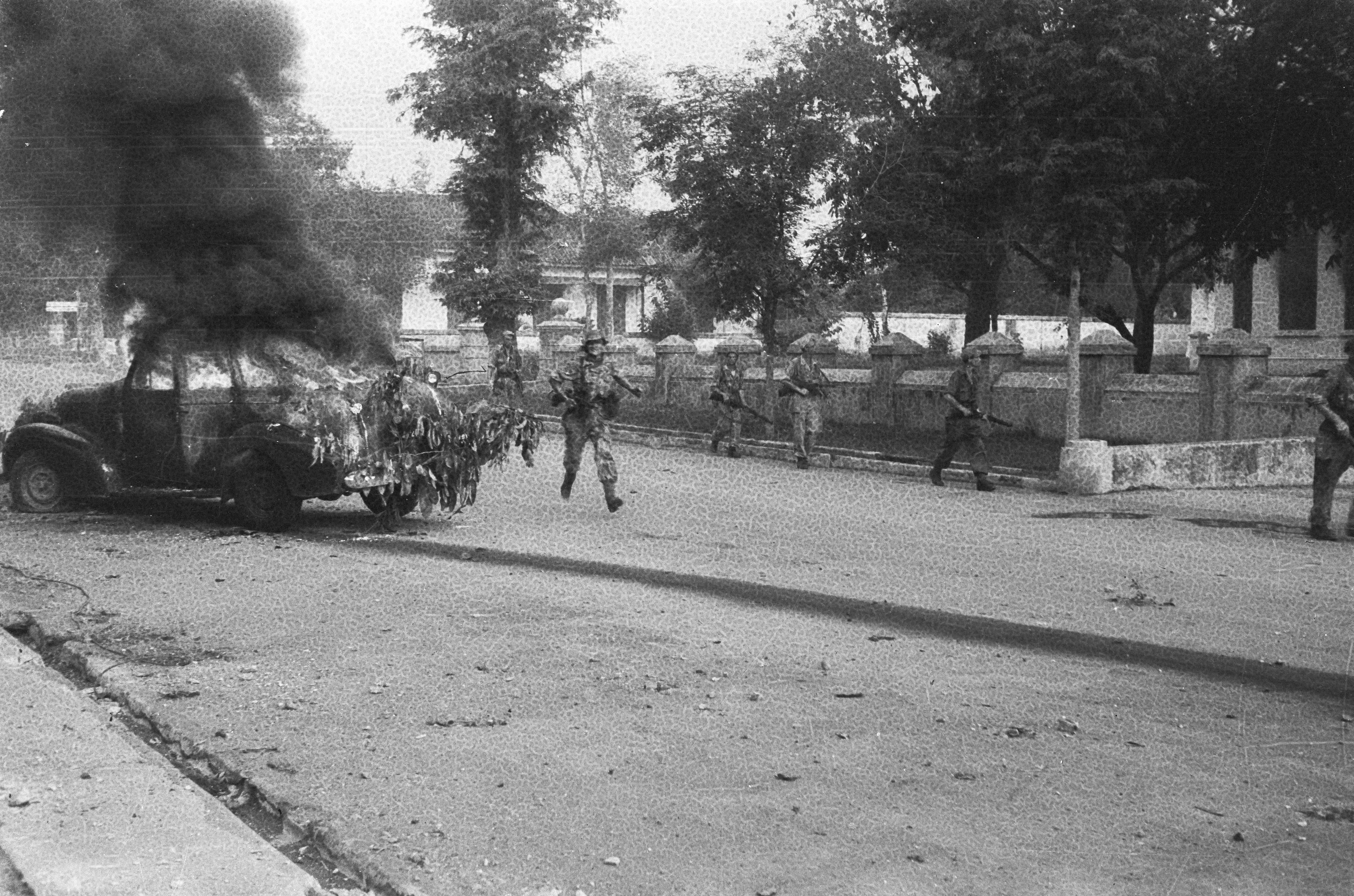
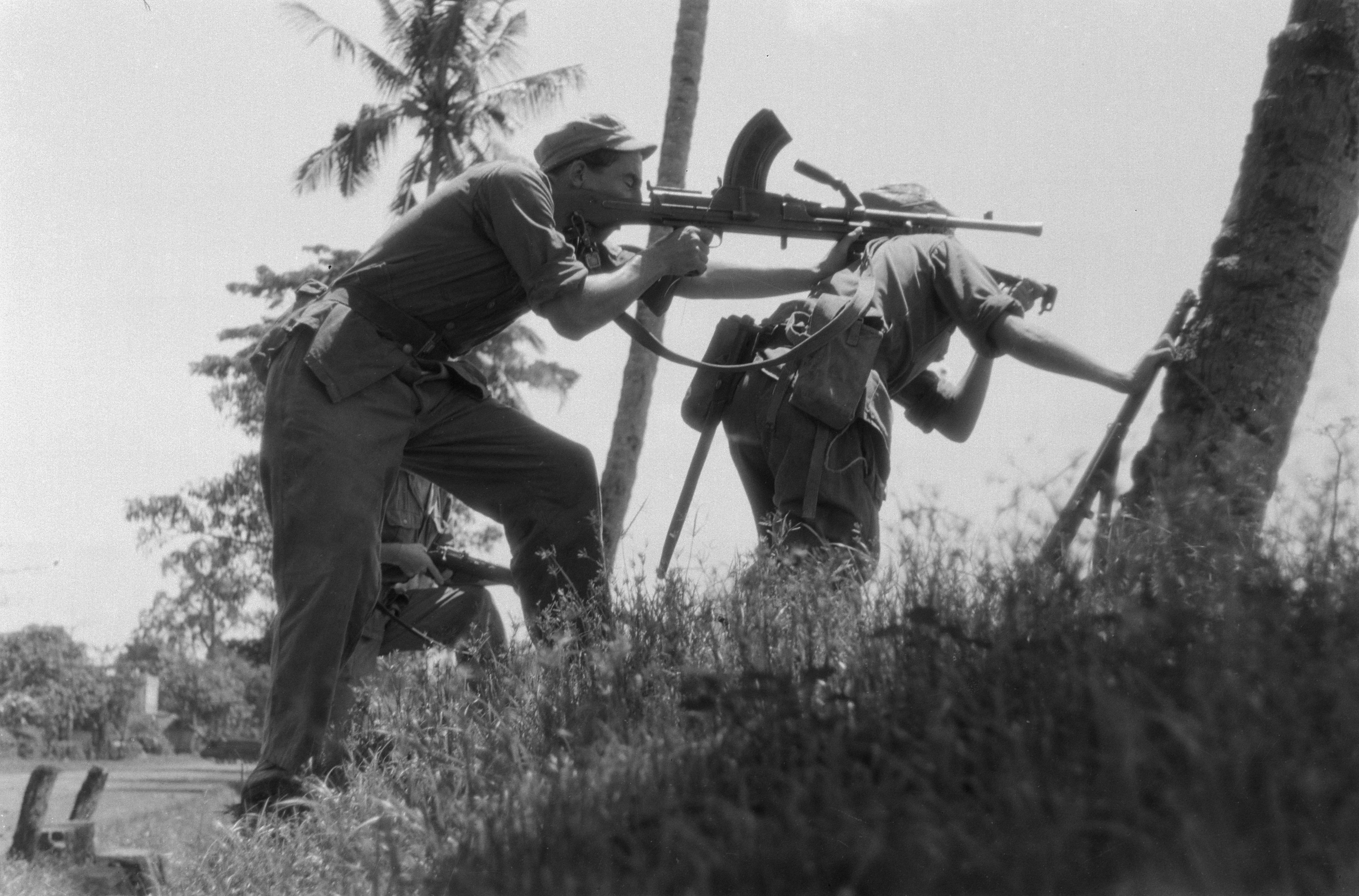
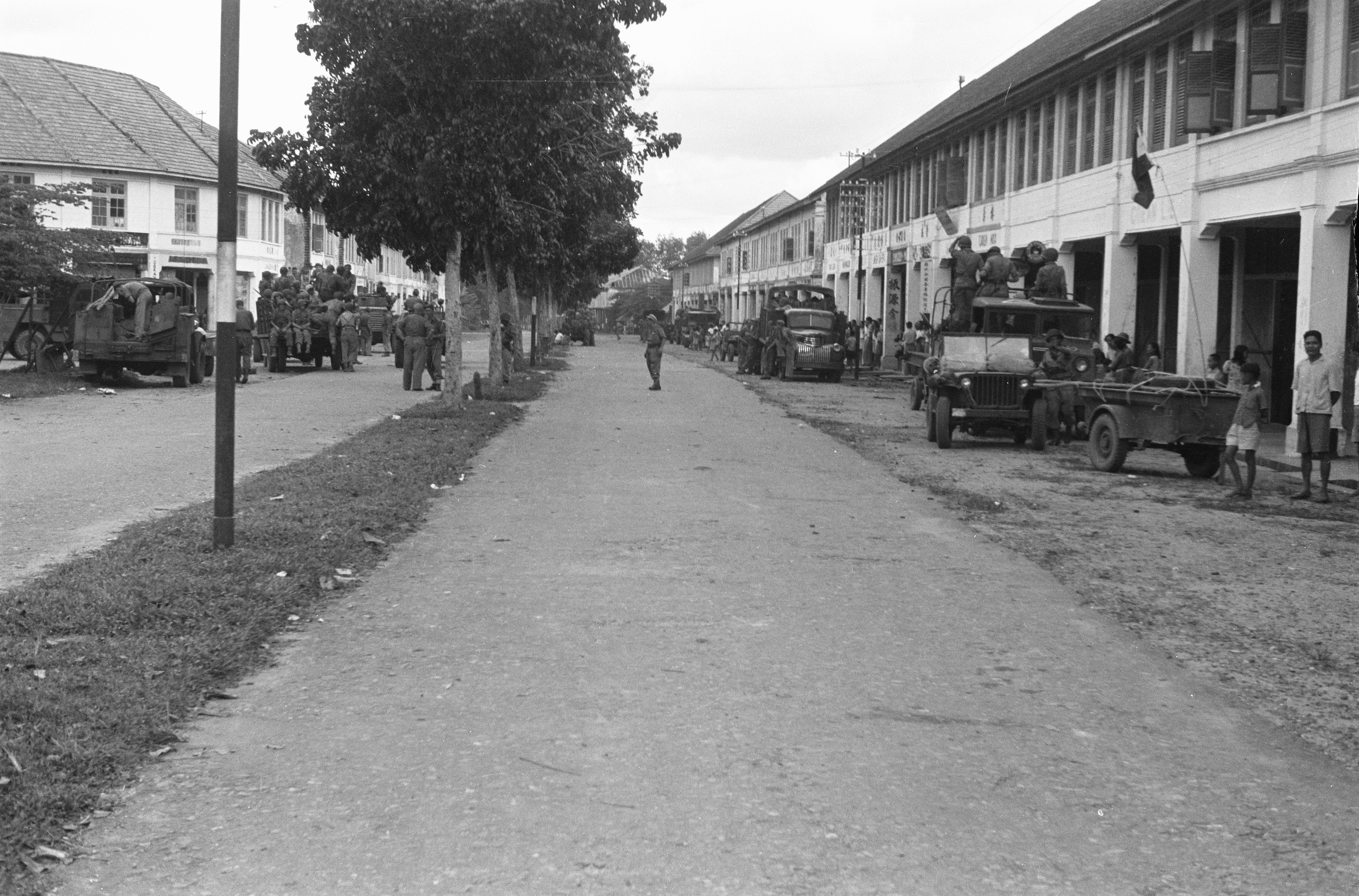
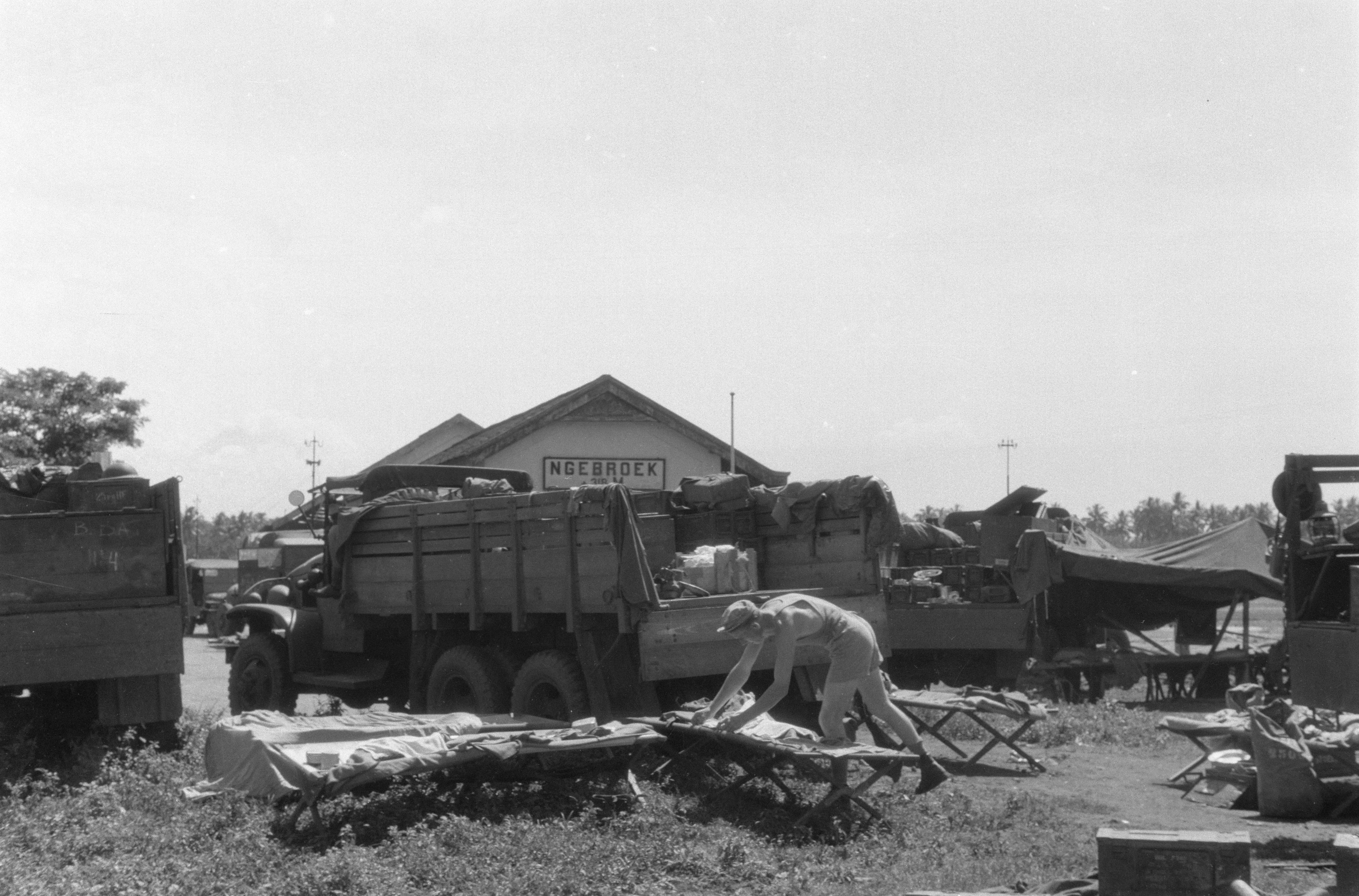
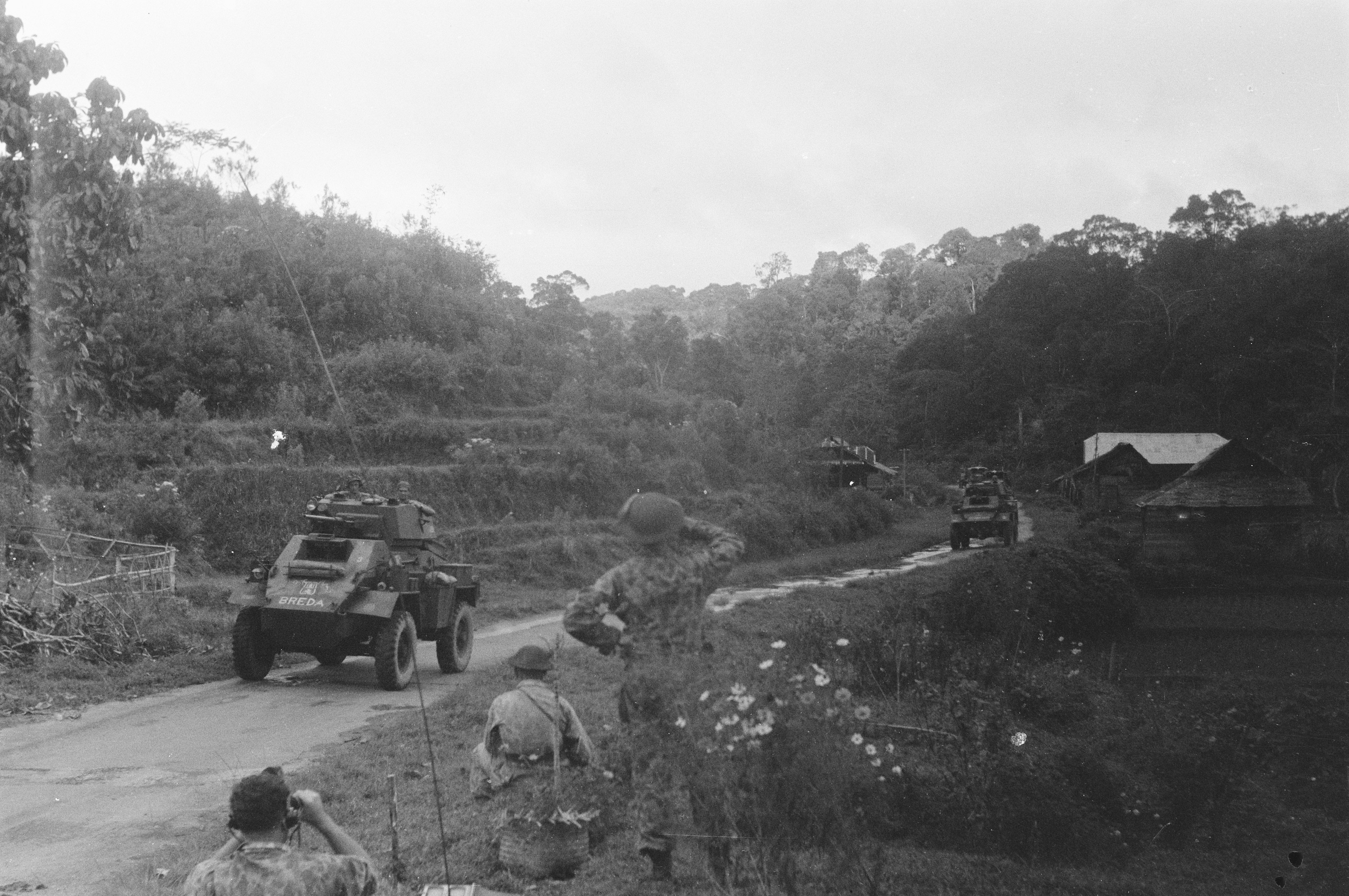
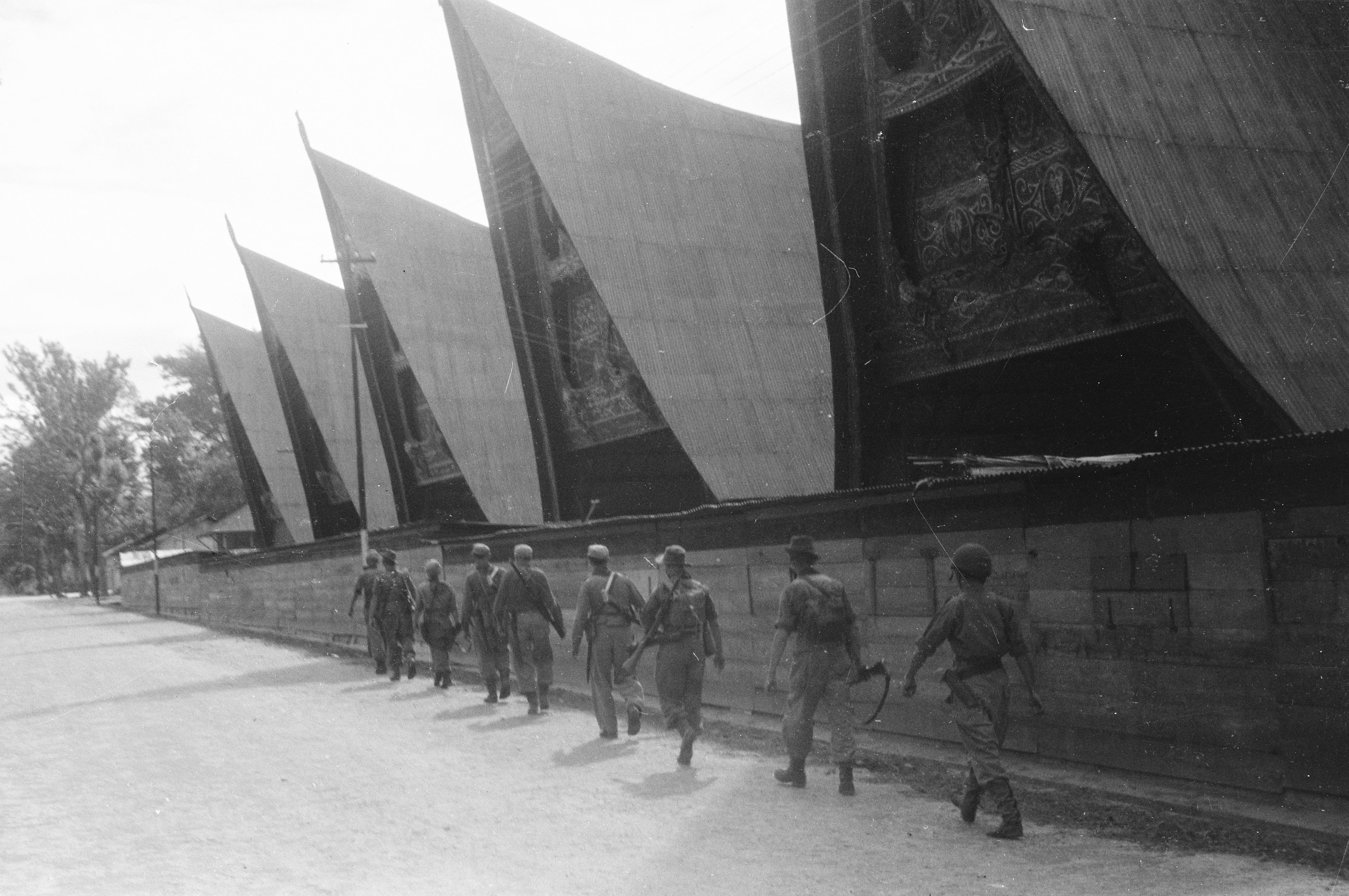
- From top, left to right: Dutch troops enter Djokjakarta. On the left a burning car.; Dutch troops on the advance of East Java; Station of Ngebroek. A bivouac is set up.; Advance in Tapanoeli (Sumatra). Patrol of Dutch soldiers passes some typical Batak houses; Advancement in Padang, Sumatra by Dutch troops.; Dutch soldiers in the main street of Rantau Prapat
Date	19 December 1948 – 5 January 1949 (2 weeks and 3 days); Guerilla warfare until 7 May 1949
Location	Java and Sumatra, Indonesia
Result	Dutch victory; Indonesian government exiled
Territorial changes	Yogyakarta captured by the Dutch

Belligerents
Indonesia	Netherlands

Commanders and leaders
(Indonesia) Sudirman; (Indonesia) Djatikoesoemo; (Indonesia) Abdul Haris Nasution	(Netherlands) Simon Hendrik Spoor; (Netherlands) Dirk van Langen

Units involved
Indonesian National Armed Forces; Indonesian Army; Indonesian Air Force	Royal Netherlands East Indies Army; Royal Netherlands East Indies Army Air Force; Korps Speciale Troepen

Strength
3 Mitsubishi Zero; 100,000 soldiers	800–900 paratroopers; 10,000 soldiers–130,000 soldiers; 23 Douglas DC-3s; Dutch fighter aircraft and bombers

Casualties and losses
4,000 casualties (including in Operation Product)	300 killed

Operation Kraai (lit. 'Operation Crow') was a Dutch military offensive launched in December 1948 against the Republic of Indonesia, after the failure of negotiations with the Republican government. The operation was one of two major offensives launched by the Netherlands during the Indonesian National Revolution, the other being Operation Product, and they are collectively referred to as the Police Actions.

With the advantage of surprise, the Dutch managed to capture the Republic of Indonesia's provisional capital of Yogyakarta along with many of its leaders, including President Sukarno and Prime Minister Mohammad Hatta. The initial offensive was followed by months of guerrilla warfare against the Dutch at the hands of the Indonesian Army led by General Sudirman. Combined with diplomatic pressure from the international world, this led to negotiations which resulted in the Roem–Van Roijen Agreement. The agreement was followed by the Dutch–Indonesian Round Table Conference which saw Dutch recognition of Indonesian sovereignty and the establishment of the United States of Indonesia.

Operation Kraai is often referred to by the Dutch as the Second Police Action (Dutch: Tweede Politionele Actie), while the military offensive is more commonly known as the Second Dutch Military Aggression (Indonesian: Agresi Militer Belanda II) in Indonesian history books and military records.

== Background ==
The second Politionele actie or military operation was aimed at conquering Jogjakarta, the then Indonesian capital, and the other areas held by the Republic of Indonesia, except for Aceh. The purpose was to dissolve the Republic of Indonesia and install a more malleable political entity that would join the federal statehood proposed by the Netherlands, thus enabling the Netherlands to preserve its control in Indonesia. The Dutch East Indies government, NICA, accused Indonesians of breaching the armistice that had been signed following Operation Product. That armistice, the Renville Agreement, stipulated the withdrawal of Indonesian forces from Dutch-occupied territory in exchange for ending the Dutch naval blockade. However, several factors complicate the situation on both sides: 1) After Dutch's Operation Product/First Offensive, Dutch hold the cities and big roads, complicating the evacuation of military personnel and civilians as they have move through smaller, less-known route; 2) While most Indonesian combatants complied to instruction to move to Indonesian side of Van Mook line, 4,000 irregulars refused the treaty and stayed on the what is now Dutch area; 3) Dutch erected land blockade around Indonesian-held areas in Central Java, Banten, and Sumatra in defiance of Renville Agreement which not only limit movement of people but also food, cloth and medicine; 4) as Dutch unilaterally pushed ahead with their proposal of creating federal states in their conquered territory, they wasted most goodwill they had. Minor hostilities continued behind Dutch's side of Status Quo Line/Van Mook Line and intensified as parts of Siliwangi Division began to infiltrate back after Madiun affair. In November—December 1948 the Dutch decided on a final military push to crush the Republic.

By September 1948, the Dutch military command had succeeded in decoding the republic's encrypted secret code, gaining crucial intelligence on Indonesian military and diplomatic strategies and plans. This allowed General Simon Hendrik Spoor to counteract republic actions on the battlefield and diplomatic stage. The Dutch were so confident of this advantage that they began organising a press conference in Jakarta explaining their actions three days before the attack was launched, to be held when it commenced. The Dutch also timed their attack to co-ordinate with plans by the Indian Prime Minister Jawaharlal Nehru to dispatch a private plane to fly Sukarno and Mohammad Hatta to Bukittinggi in West Sumatra where they would head an emergency government. A Republican delegation led by Sukarno would then be flown to New York City, via New Delhi, to advocate the republic's cause in the United Nations General Assembly. Throughout the Indonesian National Revolution, newly independent India had been sympathetic to the republic's cause, which they viewed as a struggle against Western imperialism.

On 18 December, radio broadcasts in Jakarta reported that the Dutch High Commissioner, Louis Beel, was going to give an important speech the next day. This news did not reach Yogyakarta because the Dutch had cut the communication line. Meanwhile, Spoor instructed to begin a full-scale surprise attack against the Republic. He timed the attack before coinciding with Tentara Nasional Indonesia military exercises on 19 December, giving Dutch movements some temporary camouflage and enabling them to take the enemy by surprise. The attack was also launched without the prior knowledge of the UN Committee of Good Offices.

== Battle ==
=== First offensive ===
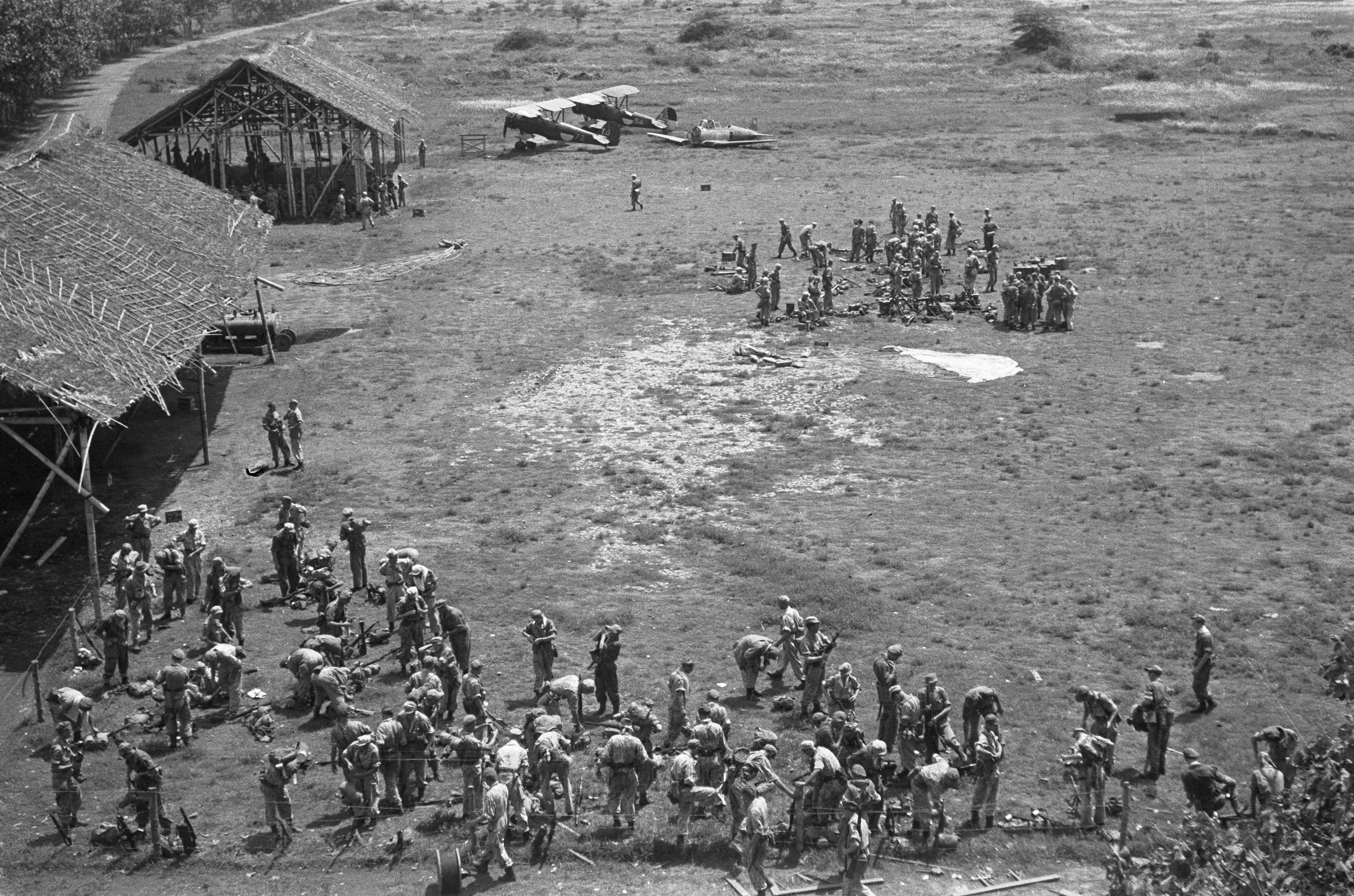
Dutch troops at Maguwo airfield with captured Indonesian Air Force biplanes in the background, 19 December 1948

The first offensive began in the early hours of 19 December. At 04:30, Dutch aircraft took off from Bandung; heading for Yogyakarta via the Indian Ocean. Meanwhile, the Dutch High Commissioner Beel announced that the Dutch were no longer bound by the Renville Agreement on radio. The operation began as the Dutch attacked major Indonesian centres in Java and Sumatra. At 05:30, Maguwo airfield and the radio station at military aircraft including Yogyakarta were bombed by the Royal Netherlands East Indies Air Force (ML-KNIL). The republic fielded only three captured Japanese Mitsubishi Zeros whereas the ML-KNIL had several American-built P-40 Kittyhawk and P-51 Mustang fighters, B-25 Mitchell bombers, and 23 Douglas DC-3s carrying approximately 900 troops.

Dutch paratroopers from Korps Speciale Troepen landed at Maguwo airfield, which was defended by 47 lightly armed Indonesian Air Force cadets who lacked anti-aircraft machine guns. In advance, dummies were landed by the Dutch to draw enemy fire which enabled Dutch fighter planes to strafe the defenders. The skirmish lasted for 25 minutes ending with the Dutch taking over Maguwo; killing 128 republicans with no casualties. Having secured the airfield perimeter by 06:45, the Dutch were able to land airborne troops in two successive waves and use Maguwo as an airhead for reinforcements from their main base in Semarang. At 8:30 am, General Spoor gave a radio broadcast ordering his forces to cross the Van Mook line and capture Yogyakarta to "purge" the republic of "unreliable elements".

The main aim of Operation Kraai was to quickly destroy the Tentara Nasional Indonesia (TNI) which Spoor thought would desperately defend their capital. Thus, with Dutch superiority both in the air and on land, the Dutch army would easily execute a final and decisive victory over the Indonesian army. However, most of the TNI had left Yogyakarta, defending western Yogyakarta's border from another Dutch military campaign. The commander General Nasution himself was on an inspection tour in East Java. The air attack found the Indonesians unprepared and within hours, the advancing Dutch army had quickly taken the airfield, main road, bridge, and strategic locations. General Sudirman's strategy was to avoid any major contact with the Dutch main army, thus saving the Indonesians from total defeat. He would prefer to lose territory but gain extra time to consolidate his army.

=== Capture of Yogyakarta ===
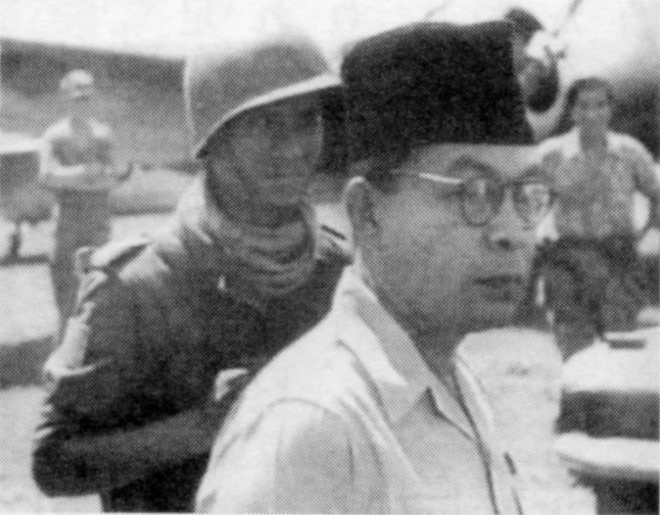
Mohammad Hatta captured by the Dutch soldiers on 21 December 1948

After hearing of the surprise attack, Indonesian military commander General Sudirman broadcast Perintah kilat (quick command) via radios. He also requested Sukarno and other leaders to evacuate and join his guerrilla army. After a cabinet meeting, they refused and decided to stay in Yogyakarta and keep communicating with the United Nations and Komisi Tiga Negara (Trilateral Commission) envoys. Sukarno also announced a plan for "emergency government" in Sumatra, in the event something happened to the Indonesian leadership in Yogyakarta.

Meanwhile, 2,600 fully armed Dutch troops (infantry and paratroopers) led by Colonel Dirk Reinhard Adelbert van Langen had gathered in Maguwo, ready to capture Yogyakarta. On that same day, most of Yogyakarta fell into Dutch hands, with key targets like the air force and chief-of-staff headquarters razed by both Indonesian "scorched earth" tactics and Dutch bombing. Indonesian President Sukarno, Vice-president Mohammad Hatta, and ex-prime minister Sutan Sjahrir were seized by the Dutch and subsequently exiled to Bangka. They let themselves be captured hoping it would outrage international support. However, this action was later criticised among Indonesian military circles which regarded it as an act of cowardice by the political leadership. Sultan Hamengkubuwono IX stayed at his palace in Yogyakarta and did not leave during the entire occupation. The Sultan himself refused to cooperate with the Dutch administration and rejected mediation attempts by the pro-Dutch Sultan of Pontianak Hamid II.

By 20 December, all remaining Republican troops in Yogyakarta had been withdrawn. Offensives were also conducted in other areas in Java and most of Sumatra. All parts of Indonesia except Aceh and some cantons in Sumatra fell under Dutch control. Sudirman, who was suffering from tuberculosis, led the guerrillas from his sickbed. General Abdul Haris Nasution, military commander of Java territories, declared the military government in Java and initiated a new guerrilla tactic called Pertahanan Keamanan Rakyat Semesta ("universal people's defense and security"), transforming the Javan countryside into a guerrilla front with civilian support.

A previously planned emergency government was declared on 19 December, the Emergency Government of the Republic of Indonesia, based in Bukittinggi, West Sumatra, led by Sjafruddin Prawiranegara. Sudirman radioed his immediate support for this government.

== Aftermath ==
This attack was well publicized internationally with many newspapers, including those in the United States, condemning Dutch attacks in their editorials. The United States threatened to suspend the Marshall Plan aid to the Dutch. This included funds vital for Dutch post-World War II rebuilding that had so far totaled $US 1 billion. The Netherlands government had spent an amount equivalent to almost half of this funding their campaigns in Indonesia. The perception that American aid was being used to fund "a senile and ineffectual imperialism" encouraged many key voices in the United States – including those amongst the US Republican Party – and from within American churches and NGOs to speak out in support of Indonesian independence.

On 24 December, the UN Security Council called for the end of hostilities. In January 1949, it passed a resolution demanding the reinstatement of the republican government. The Dutch had achieved most of their objectives and announced a ceasefire in Java on 31 December and on 5 January in Sumatra. The guerrilla war nonetheless continued. Hostilities eventually ended on 7 May with the signing of the Roem–Van Roijen Agreement.

== See also ==
- Rengat massacre
- Operation Product
