= List of sovereign states in the 1940s =

Map of the World in 1946

This is a list of sovereign states in the 1940s, giving an overview of states around the world during the period between 1 January 1940 and 31 December 1949. It contains 106 entries, arranged alphabetically, with information on the status and recognition of their sovereignty. It includes 99 widely recognized sovereign states, six entities which were de facto sovereign but which were not widely recognized by other states.

Academic datasets differ in terms of the number of states in the 1940s. At the start of the 1940s, the lowest estimate of the number of states is in the mid-50s whereas the highest is in the low-70s. At the end of the 1940s, the lowest estimate is in the mid-70s while the highest is in the mid-80s.

== Sovereign states ==
Name and capital city	Information on status and recognition of sovereignty
=== A ===
Afghanistan – Kingdom of Afghanistan; Capital: Kabul	Widely recognized independent state. LON member state (to 20 April 1946). UN member state (from 19 November 1946).
→ Albania (from 20 October 1944); Capital: Tirana: Democratic Government of Albania (from 20 October 1944 to 11 January 1946); People's Republic of Albania (from 11 January 1946)	Widely recognized independent state under Italian occupation to 8 September 1943 and German occupation from 8 September 1943 to 29 November 1944.
→ Andorra – Principality of Andorra; Capital: Andorra la Vella	Widely recognized independent state. The President of France and Bishop of Urgell were ex officio Co-Princes of Andorra. The defense of Andorra was the responsibility of France and Spain.
Argentina – Argentine Republic; Capital: Buenos Aires	Widely recognized independent state. LON member state to 20 April 1946. UN member state from 27 December 1945. Argentina was a federation of 23 provinces and 10 federal territories. (Note: 23 Provinces: Buenos Aires, Catamarca, Chubut (from 15 June 1955), Córdoba, Corrientes, Entre Ríos, Formosa (from 15 June 1955), Jujuy, La Pampa (renamed Eva Perón from 29 January 1952 to 27 April 1956), La Rioja, Mendoza, Misiones (from 1953), Neuquén (from 15 June 1955), Presidente Juan Perón (from 10 August 1951, renamed Chaco on 27 April 1956), Río Negro (from 15 June 1955), Salta, San Juan, San Luis, Santa Cruz (from 1957), Santa Fe, Santiago del Estero, Tucumán. 10 Territories: Buenos Aires, Chaco (to 10 August 1951, renamed Presidente Juan Perón in 1950), Chubut (to 15 June 1955), Formosa (to 15 June 1955), Misiones (to 1953), Neuquén (to 15 June 1955), Río Negro (to 15 June 1955), Santa Cruz (to 1957), Tierra del Fuego.) It had a claim over Argentine Antarctica (from 1942). It also claimed the Falkland Islands and South Georgia and the South Sandwich Islands, both of which were British overseas territories.
Australia – Commonwealth of Australia; Capital: Canberra	Widely recognized de facto independent state. De jure independent from October 9, 1942. LON member state to 20 April 1946. UN member state from 1 November 1945. British dominion and Commonwealth realm. Australia was a federation of six states and three territories. (Note: 6 States: New South Wales, Queensland, South Australia, Tasmania, Victoria, Western Australia. 3 Territories: Australian Capital Territory, Jervis Bay Territory, Northern Territory.) It had sovereignty over the following external territories: Australian Antarctic Territory; Heard Island and McDonald Islands (from 26 December 1947); Norfolk Island; Australia administered one League of Nations mandate/United Nations trust territory: New Guinea (to 6 November 1949); Australia administered two United Nations Trust Territories: Nauru (with New Zealand and the United Kingdom, from August 21 1945); Papua and New Guinea (from 6 November 1949)
=== B ===
Belgium – Kingdom of Belgium (to 17 May 1940, from 3 September 1944); Capital: Brussels	Widely recognized independent state. LON member state to 20 April 1946. Had a government in exile and an occupation by Germany from October 1940 to September 1944. UN member state from 27 December 1945. Belgium had sovereignty over one colony: Belgian Congo; Belgium administered one League of Nations mandate / United Nations trust territory: (Belgium) Ruanda-Urundi (LON mandate became UN trust territory from December 13, 1946)
Bhutan – Kingdom of Bhutan (from 8 August 1949); Capital: Punakha	Widely recognized independent state. Bhutan was officially guided by India in its foreign affairs.
Bolivia – Republic of Bolivia; Capital: Sucre (official), La Paz (administrative)	Widely recognized independent state. LON member state to 20 April 1946. UN member state from 14 November 1945.
Brazil; Capital: Rio de Janeiro: Estado Novo (to 31 January 1946); Fourth Brazilian Republic (from 18 September 1946)	Widely recognized independent state. UN member state from 24 October 1945. Brazil was a federation of 20 states, five territories, and one federal district. (Note: 20 states: Alagoas, Amazonas, Bahia, Ceará, Espírito Santo, Goiás, Maranhão, Mato Grosso, Minas Gerais, Pará, Paraíba, Paraná, Pernambuco, Piauí, Rio Grande do Norte, Rio Grande do Sul, Rio de Janeiro, Santa Catarina, São Paulo, Sergipe. 5 territories: Acre, Amapá (from September 13, 1943), Fernando de Noronha (from February 9, 1942), Iguaçu (from September 13, 1943 to September 18, 1946), Ponta Porã (from September 13, 1943 to September 18, 1946), Guaporé (from September 13, 1943), Rio Branco (from September 13, 1943). 1 federal district: Federal District.)
(Tsardom of Bulgaria (1908–1946)) → → → Bulgaria; Capital: Sofia: Kingdom of Bulgaria (to 15 September 1946); People's Republic of Bulgaria (from 15 September 1946)	Widely recognized independent state. LON member state to 20 April 1946.
Burma – Union of Burma (from 4 January 1948); Capital: Rangoon	Widely recognized independent state. UN member state from 19 April 1948.
=== C ===
Canada – Dominion of Canada; Capital: Ottawa	Widely recognized independent state. LON member state to 20 April 1946. UN member state from 9 November 1945. Commonwealth realm. Canada was a federation of ten provinces and two territories. (Note: 10 Provinces: Alberta, British Columbia, Manitoba, New Brunswick, Newfoundland (from 31 March 1949), Nova Scotia, Ontario, Prince Edward Island, Quebec, Saskatchewan. 2 Territories: Northwest Territories, Yukon.)
Ceylon – Dominion of Ceylon (from 4 February 1948); Capital: Colombo	Widely recognized independent state. Commonwealth realm.
Chile – Republic of Chile; Capital: Santiago	Widely recognized independent state. UN member state from 24 October 1945.
China, Republic of Capital: Nanking (to 2 September 1945), Chunking (from 2 September 1945 to 7 December 1949), Taipei (from 7 December 1949): Republic of China (mainland) (to 1 October 1949); Republic of China (Taiwan) (from 1 October 1949)	Widely recognized independent state. LON member state to 20 April 1946. UN member state from 24 October 1945. The Republic of China claimed to be the sole legitimate government of China (from 1 October 1949), but only administered Taiwan, Hainan, Kinmen, the Matsu Islands, Pratas Island, Itu Aba, and portions of Yunnan Province. The Republic of China had territorial claims over Mongolia; the Tuvan Autonomous Soviet Socialist Republic; the Sixty-Four Villages East of the River (administered by the Soviet Union); The majority of Gorno-Badakhshan (administered by the Soviet Union); The eastern tip of the Wakhan Corridor (administered by Afghanistan); part of the disputed Kashmir region; eastern Bhutan; South Tibet (controlled by India's North-East Frontier Agency); and Kachin State (administered by Burma).
Colombia – Republic of Colombia; Capital: Bogotá	Widely recognized independent state. LON member state to 20 April 1946. UN member state from 5 November 1945. Colombia claimed Quita Sueño Bank, Roncador Bank, and Serrana Bank (disputed by the United States); Bajo Nuevo Bank (disputed by Jamaica, Nicaragua and the United States); and Serranilla Bank (disputed by Nicaragua and the United States)
Costa Rica; Capital: San José: First Republic of Costa Rica (to 24 April 1948); Second Republic of Costa Rica (from 24 April 1948)	Widely recognized independent state. UN member state from 2 November 1945.
Cuba – Republic of Cuba; Capital: Havana	Widely recognized independent state; LON member state to 20 April 1946 and UN member state from 2 November 1945. The Cuban area of Guantánamo Bay was under the total control of the United States.
Czechoslovakia (from April 3, 1945); Capital: Prague: Third Czechoslovak Republic (from April 3, 1945 to February 25, 1948); Fourth Czechoslovak Republic (from February 25, 1948)	Widely recognized independent state under German occupation to 8 May 1945, also had a government in exile to 5 April 1945. UN member state from 24 October 1945. (Note: Owing to a dispute over lands seized during World War II, Liechtenstein and Czechoslovakia did not recognize each other.)
=== D ===
Denmark – Kingdom of Denmark (to 9 April 1940, from 5 May 1945); Capital: Copenhagen	Widely recognized independent state. LON member state to 20 April 1940. UN member state from 24 October 1945.
Dominican Republic – Third Dominican Republic; Capital: Santo Domingo	Widely recognized independent state. LON member state to 9 April 1946. UN member state from 24 October 1945.
=== E ===
Ecuador; Capital: Quito: Republic of Ecuador (to 1 June 1944); Republic of Ecuador (from 1 June 1944)	Widely recognized independent state; LON member state to 9 April 1946 and UN member state from 21 December 1945, The country was under Peruvian occupation from July 23, 1941 to February 12, 1942.
(Kingdom of Egypt) Egypt – Kingdom of Egypt; Capital: Cairo	Widely recognized independent state; LON member state to 9 April 1946 and UN member state from 24 October 1945.
El Salvador – Republic of El Salvador; Capital: San Salvador	Widely recognized independent state; UN member state from 24 October 1945.
Estonia – Republic of Estonia (to June 17, 1940); Capital: Tallinn	Widely recognized independent state until June 1940, LON member state to 19 April 1946. Invaded and annexed by USSR in 1940; maintained diplomatic representatives and a government in exile.
Ethiopia – Ethiopian Empire (from 5 May, 1941); Capital: Addis Ababa	Widely recognized independent state and LON member state to 24 October 1945; UN member state from 24 October 1945.
=== F ===
Finland – Republic of Finland; Capital: Helsinki	Widely recognized independent state. LON member state to 9 April 1946.
France; Capital: Paris (de jure), Vichy (de facto from 22 June 1940 to 20 August 1944) Algiers (de facto from 3 June to 31 August 1944): French Republic (to 22 June 1940); French State (from 22 June 1940 to 20 August 1944); Provisional Government of the French Republic (from 20 August 1944 to 14 October 1946); French Republic (from 14 October 1946)	Widely recognized independent state. LON member state to 18 April 1941 and from 20 August 1944 to 9 April 1946. UN member state from 24 October 1945. France administered the foreign affairs of the following colonies and protectorates: French Algeria (de jure Department of Metropolitan France, de facto Colony); French Equatorial Africa (Colony); French Guiana (Colony); French India – French Establishments in India (Colony); French Indochina (Federation of protectorates); French Madagascar (Colony); French Morocco (Protectorate); French Oceania – French Establishments in Oceania (Colony); French Somaliland (Colony); French Tunisia (Protectorate); French West Africa (Colony); Guadeloupe (Colony); Inini (Colony from June 6, 1930); Martinique (Colony); Saar (from 15 December 1947); France administered the following League of Nations mandates: → Lebanese Republic; → Syrian Republic (from May 14, 1930); French Cameroons; French Togoland
=== G ===
Germany (to 8 May 1945); Capital: Berlin: German Reich (to 26 June 1943); Greater German Reich (from 26 June 1943 to 8 May 1945)	Widely recognized independent state to 8 May 1945.
(Kingdom of Greece) Greece – Kingdom of Greece (to 23 April 1941, From October 13, 1944); Capital: Athens	Widely recognized independent state. LON member state to April 1941, from Oct 13 1944 to 20 April 1946. Had a government in exile from April 1941 to October 1944. UN member state from 25 October 1945.
Guatemala – Republic of Guatemala; Capital: Guatemala City	Widely recognized independent state. UN member state (from 21 November 1945)
=== H ===
Haiti – Republic of Haiti; Capital: Port-au-Prince	Widely recognized independent state. LON member state to April 1942. UN member state from 24 October 1945.
→ Honduras – Republic of Honduras; Capital: Tegucigalpa	Widely recognized independent state. UN member state from 17 December 1945.
(Kingdom of Hungary (1920–1946)) → (Hungarian Republic (1946–49)) → (Hungarian People's Republic) Hungary; Capital: Budapest: Kingdom of Hungary (to 1 February 1946); Hungarian Republic (from 1 February 1946 to 20 August 1949); Hungarian People's Republic (from 20 August 1949)	Widely recognized independent state.
=== I ===
→ Iceland; Capital: Reykjavík: Kingdom of Iceland (to 17 June 1944); Iceland (from 17 June 1944)	Widely recognized independent state. Associated state in personal union with Denmark to 17 June 1944. UN member state from 19 November 1946.
India – Union of India (from 15 August 1947); Capital: New Delhi	Widely recognized independent state. UN member state. Commonwealth realm.
Indonesia (from 17 August 1945); Capital: Djakarta: Republic of Indonesia (from 17 August 1945 to 27 December 1949); United States of Indonesia (from 27 December 1949)	Widely recognized independent state.
Iran – Imperial State of Iran; Capital: Tehran	Widely recognized independent state. UN member state from 12 November 1945. Under joint British military occupation from 30 August 1941 to 2 March 1946 and Soviet military occupation to May 1946.
Iraq – Kingdom of Iraq; Capital: Baghdad	Widely recognized independent state and LON member state to 20 April 1946; UN member state from 21 December 1945. Under British military occupation from 31 May 1941 to 26 October 1947.
Ireland; Capital: Dublin	Widely recognized independent state and LON member state to 20 April 1946. Commonwealth realm. (to 18 April 1949)
Israel – State of Israel (from 14 May 1948); Capital: Jerusalem	Widely recognized independent state. UN member state from 11 May 1949. (Note: Israel was not recognized by Afghanistan, Egypt, India, Indonesia, Iraq, Ireland, Jordan, Lebanon, North Korea, Pakistan, Saudi Arabia, Syria, and Yemen.)
→ Italy; Capital: Rome (to September 1943, from February 1944), Brindisi (from September 1943 to February 1944): Kingdom of Italy (to 2 June 1946); Italian Republic (from 2 June 1946)	Widely recognized independent state under fascism to 3 September 1943.: Italian Albania (to 8 September 1943); Hellenic State (Italian and German puppet state from 23 April 1941 to 25 July 1943); Italian Montenegro (from 3 October 1941 to 25 July 1943); Italian Libya (to 13 May 1943); Italian East Africa (to 27 November 1941); (All colonies relinquished by Italy from the Treaty of Paris on 10 February 1947.)
=== J ===
→ Japan; Capital: Tokyo: Empire of Japan (to 2 May 1947); Japan (from 2 May 1947)	Widely recognized independent state under Allied occupation from 2 September 1945. Japan had sovereignty over the following dependencies and concessions: (Empire of Japan) Hangzhou (Concession); (Empire of Japan) Hankou (Concession); Japanese Korea (Chōsen) (Note: Claimed by Provisional Government of the Republic of Korea (partially recognized government-in-exile).) (Dependency); Karafuto (Dependency); Kwantung (Concession); (Empire of Japan) Shashi (Concession); (Empire of Japan) Suzhou (Concession); Taiwan (Dependency); Tientsin (Concession); Japan administered one League of Nations mandate: South Seas Mandate
=== K ===
→ Korea, North (from 8 February 1946); Capital: Pyongyang: Provisional People's Committee for North Korea (from 8 February 1946 to 21 February 1947); People's Committee of North Korea (from 21 February 1947 to 9 September 1948); Democratic People's Republic of Korea (from 9 September 1948)	Widely recognized independent state. (Note: North Korea was not recognized by the Estonian exile government, France, Japan, or South Korea.) Claimed to be the sole legitimate government of Korea.
→ → Korea, South – Republic of Korea (from 17 August 1948); Capital: Seoul	Widely recognized independent state. (Note: South Korea was not recognized by the Soviet Union, the People's Republic of China, Romania or North Korea.) Permanent observer at the UN. Claimed to be the sole legitimate government of Korea.
=== L ===
Latvia – Republic of Latvia (to 17 August 1940); Capital: Riga	Widely recognized independent state. LON member state to 5 August 1940 and in exile to 20 April 1946. Conquered by a Soviet offensive but maintained a government in exile.
Lebanon – Lebanese Republic (from 22 November 1943); Capital: Beirut	Widely recognized independent state. UN member state from October 1945.
Liberia – Republic of Liberia; Capital: Monrovia	Widely recognized independent state.LON member state to 20 April 1946. UN member state from 2 November 1945.
Liechtenstein – Principality of Liechtenstein; Capital: Vaduz	Widely recognized independent state.
Lithuania – Republic of Lithuania (to 15 June 1940); Capital: Vilnius	Widely recognized independent state.LON member state to 5 August 1940 and in exile to 20 April 1946. Conquered by a Soviet offensive but maintained a government in exile.
Luxembourg – Grand Duchy of Luxembourg (to 10 May 1940, from 11 September 1944); Capital: Luxembourg City	Widely recognized independent state; LON member state to 10 May 1940, from 11 Sept 1944 to 20 April 1946 and in exile from 10 May 1940 to 11 Sept 1944. Conquered by a German offensive but maintained a government in exile based in London and a UN member state from 24 October 1945.
=== M ===
Mexico – United Mexican States; Capital: Mexico City	Widely recognized independent state. LON member state to 20 April 1946. UN member state from 17 November 1945.
Monaco – Principality of Monaco; Capital: Monaco	Widely recognized independent state.
→ → Mongolia – Mongolian People's Republic; Capital: Ulaanbaatar	Widely recognized independent state from January 5, 1946.
Muscat and Oman – Sultanate of Muscat and Oman; Capital: Muscat	De jure independent state. De facto a British protectorate.
=== N ===
Nepal – Kingdom of Nepal; Capital: Kathmandu	Widely recognized independent state.
Netherlands – Kingdom of the Netherlands (to 15 May 1940, from 5 May 1945); Capital: Amsterdam	Widely recognized independent state. LON member state to 20 April 1946. UN member state from 10 December 1945. Under occupation by Germany from 10 May 1940 to 5 May 1945, also had a government in exile from 15 May 1940 to 5 May 1945. The Netherlands had sovereignty over three colonies: Curaçao and Dependencies (renamed Netherlands Antilles in May 1948); Dutch East Indies (de facto to 17 August 1945, de jure to 27 December 1949); Surinam
New Zealand; Capital: Wellington: Dominion of New Zealand (to 25 November 1947); Dominion of New Zealand (from 25 November 1947)	Widely recognized de facto independent state. De jure independent from 25 November, 1947. LON member state to 20 April 1946. UN member state from 24 October 1945. Dominion of the British Empire until 25 Nov 1947. Commonwealth realm. New Zealand had sovereignty over four dependent territories: Cook Islands (Dependent territory); Niue-Fekai (Dependent territory); Union Islands (Dependent territory); Ross Dependency (Uninhabited dependent territory); New Zealand administered one League of Nations mandate: Western Samoa
Nicaragua – Republic of Nicaragua; Capital: Managua	Widely recognized independent state. UN member state (from 24 Oct 1945).
Norway – Kingdom of Norway; Capital: Oslo	Widely recognized independent state. LON member state to 20 April 1946. UN member state from 24 October 1945. Under occupation by Germany from 9 April 1940 to 8 May 1945.
=== P ===
Pakistan – Dominion of Pakistan (from 14 Aug 1947); Capital: Karachi	Widely recognized independent state. UN member state (from 30 September 1947). Commonwealth realm.
Panama – Republic of Panama; Capital: Panama City	Widely recognized independent state. LON member state to 20 April 1946. UN member state from 13 November 1945.
Paraguay – Republic of Paraguay; Capital: Asunción	Widely recognized independent state. UN member state from 24 Oct 1945.
Peru – Peruvian Republic; Capital: Lima	Widely recognized independent state. UN member state from 31 October 1945.
Philippines; Capital: Manila: Commonwealth of the Philippines (until 4 July 1946); Republic of the Philippines (from 4 July 1946)	Widely recognized independent state from 4 Jul 1946. UN member state from 24 October 1945. The commonwealth was under Japanese occupation from 1942 to 1945. The Philippine Government went into exile during that same time.
Poland (from 31 December 1944); Capital: Warsaw: Provisional Government of the Republic of Poland (from 31 December 1944 to 28 June 1945); Provisional Government of National Unity (from 28 June 1945 to 19 January 1947); Republic of Poland (from 19 January 1947)	Widely recognized independent state. LON member state to 20 April 1946. UN member state from 24 October 1945. Poland's government was still in exile.
Portugal – Portuguese Republic; Capital: Lisbon	Widely recognized independent state. LON member state to 20 April 1946. The following were colonies and possession of Portugal: Portuguese Cape Verde (Colony); Portuguese Macau (Colony); Portuguese East Africa (Colony); Portuguese Guinea (Colony); Portuguese India (Colony); Portuguese Timor (Colony); Portuguese West Africa (Colony); Fort of São João Baptista de Ajudá (Possession); Portuguese São Tomé and Príncipe (Colony)
=== R ===
→ → Romania; Capital: Bucharest: Kingdom of Romania (to 30 Dec 1947); Romanian People's Republic (from 30 Dec 1947)	Widely recognized independent state under fascism from 14 September 1940 to 24 September 1944.
=== S ===
San Marino – Most Serene Republic of San Marino; Capital: City of San Marino	Widely recognized independent state.
Saudi Arabia – Kingdom of Saudi Arabia; Capital: Riyadh	Widely recognized independent state; UN member state from 24 October 1945.
Sikkim – Kingdom of Sikkim (from 15 August 1947); Capital: Gangtok	Widely recognized independent state from 15 August 1947. Protectorate of British India prior.
South Africa – Union of South Africa; Capital: Pretoria (administrative), Cape Town (legislative), Bloemfontein (judicial)	Widely recognized independent state. UN member state from 17 November 1945. Commonwealth realm. South Africa administered one League of Nations mandate: South West Africa
Soviet Union – Union of Soviet Socialist Republics; Capital: Moscow	Widely recognized independent state. UN member state from 24 October 1945. The Soviet Union was a federation of 11 (later 16) republics. (Note: Byelorussian SSR, Russian SFSR, Ukrainian SSR, Uzbek SSR, Turkmen SSR, Tajik SSR, Armenian SSR, Azerbaijan SSR, Georgian SSR, Kazakh SSR, Kirghiz SSR, Karelo-Finnish SSR (from March 31, 1940), Moldavian SSR (from August 2, 1940), Lithuanian SSR (from August 3, 1940), Latvian SSR (from August 5, 1940), Estonian SSR (from August 6, 1940).) Those republics being: → Armenian SSR; → Azerbaijani SSR; Byelorussian SSR (to 22 June 1941, from 29 August 1944); → Estonian SSR (from 6 August 1940, to 22 June 1941, from 26 September 1944); Georgian SSR; → Kazakh SSR; Kirghiz SSR; → Latvian SSR (from 5 August 1940, to 10 July 1941, from 13 October 1944); → Lithuanian SSR (from 15 June 1940, to 22 June 1941, from 28 January 1945); Moldavian SSR (from 2 August 1940); Russian SFSR; → Tajik SSR; → Turkmen SSR; Ukrainian SSR; → Uzbek SSR; Karelo-Finnish SSR (from 31 March 1940); Other areas include: Moldavian ASSR (to 2 August 1940); Karelo-Finnish ASSR (to 31 March 1940); Soviet Civil Administration (occupied territory from 1945, to 9 September 1948
(Francoist Spain) → (Francoist Spain) Spain – Spanish State; Capital: Madrid	Widely recognized independent state. Spain had sovereignty over the following overseas provinces: → Ifni (Colony); → Spanish Guinea (Colony); → Spanish Sahara (Colony); → Spanish West Africa (Colony from July 20, 1946); Spanish Morocco (Protectorate)
Sweden – Kingdom of Sweden; Capital: Stockholm	Widely recognized independent state. UN member state.
Switzerland – Swiss Confederation; Capital: Bern	Widely recognized independent state. LON member state. Permanent observer at the UN.
Syria – Syrian Republic (from 24 October 1945); Capital: Damascus	Widely recognized independent state. UN member state from 24 October 1945.
=== T ===
Thailand / Siam; Capital: Bangkok: Kingdom of Thailand (to 7 September 1945, from 11 May 1949); Kingdom of Siam (from 7 September 1945 to 11 May 1949)	Widely recognized independent state. LON member state. UN member state from 16 December 1946.
(Jordan) Transjordan / Jordan (from 25 May 1946); Capital: Amman: Hashemite Kingdom of Transjordan (from 25 May 1946 to April 1949); Hashemite Kingdom of Jordan (from 3 April 1949)	Widely-recognized independent state.
Turkey – Republic of Turkey; Capital: Ankara	Widely recognized independent state. LON member state to October 4, 1945. UN member state from October 4, 1945.
=== U ===
United Kingdom – United Kingdom of Great Britain and Northern Ireland; Capital: London	Widely recognized independent state. LON member state to October 4, 1945. UN member state from October 4, 1945. Part of the Commonwealth realm. The United Kingdom was composed of four constituent countries: England, Northern Ireland, Scotland, and Wales. The United Kingdom had sovereignty over the following colonies, protectorates and territories: Aden – Aden Colony and Protectorate (Crown colony and protectorate); + Anglo-Egyptian Sudan (Condominium of the United Kingdom and the Kingdom of Egypt); Ashanti (Protectorate); Bahama Islands (Crown colony); Bahrain – State of Bahrain (Protectorate); Barbados (Crown colony); (United Kingdom) Basutoland – Territory of Basutoland (Crown colony); (United Kingdom) Bechuanaland – Bechuanaland Protectorate (Protectorate); Bermuda (Crown colony); Bhutan – Kingdom of Bhutan (Independent state under Treaty of Punakha to August 8, 1949); British Guiana (Crown colony); British Honduras (Crown colony); British Leeward Islands – Federal Colony of the Leeward Islands (Crown colony); (United Kingdom) British Solomon Islands Protectorate; British Somaliland – British Somaliland Protectorate (Protectorate); British Windward Islands – Federal Colony of the Windward Islands (Crown colony); Brunei – State of Brunei (Protectorate to April 1, 1942, from June 14, 1945); (Myanmar) Burma (Crown colony to 1942, from March 27, 1945 to January 4, 1948); Canton and Enderbury Islands (Condominium of the United Kingdom and the United States); (Dominion of Ceylon) Ceylon (Crown colony to February 4, 1948); Cyprus (Crown colony); (United Kingdom) Cyrenaica (Occupied territory from October 23, 1942); (United Kingdom) Eritrea (Occupied territory); → Falkland Islands (Crown colony); Faroe Islands (Occupied territory, from April 12, 1940 to September 16, 1945); Federated Malay States (Protectorate to February 15, 1942, from September 12, 1945 to April 1, 1946); Gambia – Gambia Colony and Protectorate (Crown colony and protectorate); Gibraltar (Crown colony); Gilbert and Ellice Islands – Gilbert and Ellice Islands Colony (Crown colony); Gold Coast (Crown colony); (United Kingdom) Heard Island and McDonald Islands (uninhabited possession); Hong Kong (Crown colony to December 28, 1941, from August 28, 1945); India – Indian Empire (Crown colony to August 15, 1947) ^{[UN from October 30, 1945]}; (United Kingdom) Italian Somaliland (Occupied territory from February 26, 1941); Jamaica (Crown colony); Johor – State of Johor Darul Ta'zim (Protectorate to February 16, 1942, from September 12, 1945 to April 1, 1946); Kedah – State of Kedah Darul Aman (Protectorate to February 16, 1942, from September 8, 1945 to April 1, 1946); Kelantan – State of Kelantan Darul Naim (Protectorate to February 16, 1942, from September 8, 1945 to April 1, 1946); Kenya – Kenya Colony and Protectorate (Crown colony and protectorate); → Kuwait – State of Kuwait (Protectorate); Labuan (Crown colony from April 1, 1946 to July 15, 1946); Malaya (Protectorate from February 1, 1948); Malayan Union (Colony from April 1, 1946 to January 31, 1948); Maldive Islands – Sultanate of the Maldive Islands (Protectorate); → Malta (Crown colony); Mauritius (Crown colony); Muscat and Oman – Sultanate of Muscat and Oman (State under the informal protection); (United Kingdom) Newfoundland – Dominion of Newfoundland (Dominion, to 31 March, 1949) (Note: Following the commission of government in 1934, Newfoundland reverted back to being run like a crown colony. Newfoundland joined Canada on March 31, 1949 as a province.); Nigeria – Colony and Protectorate of Nigeria (Crown colony and protectorate); → North Borneo (Protectorate to January 2, 1942, from September 10, 1945 until July 15, 1946 when the protectorate became a crown colony); Northern Rhodesia – Protectorate of Northern Rhodesia (Protectorate); Northern Territories of the Gold Coast (Protectorate); Nyasaland – Nyasaland Protectorate (Protectorate); Perlis – State of Perlis Indera Kayangan (Protectorate to February 16, 1942, from September 8, 1945 to April 1, 1946); (United Kingdom) Pitcairn Island (Possession); → Qatar – State of Qatar (Protectorate); (United Kingdom) Redonda (Possession); Saint Helena (Crown colony); → Sarawak – Kingdom of Sarawak (Protectorate to 1941, from September 10, 1945 to April 1, 1946 when the protectorate became a crown colony); Seychelles (Crown colony); Sierra Leone – Sierra Leone Colony and Protectorate (Crown colony and protectorate); Sikkim (Independent state under the Treaty of Tumlong until August 15, 1947); Singapore (Crown colony from April 1, 1946); (United Kingdom) South Orkney Islands (Uninhabited possession); Southern Rhodesia – Colony of Southern Rhodesia (Crown colony); (United Kingdom) South Shetland Islands (Uninhabited possession); Straits Settlements (Crown colony to 1941, from September 12, 1945 to April 1, 1946); (United Kingdom) Suez Canal Zone (Crown colony); (United Kingdom) Swaziland – Swaziland Protectorate (Protectorate); Terengganu – State of Terengganu Darul Iman (Protectorate to 1942, from September 8, 1945 to April 1, 1946); (United Kingdom) Tientsin (Concession until 1945); Trinidad and Tobago (Crown colony); (United Kingdom) Tripolitania (Occupied territory from October 23, 1942); (Emirate of Sharjah) Trucial States (Protectorate); Uganda (Protectorate); Zanzibar – Sultanate of Zanzibar (Protectorate); United Kingdom administered the following League of Nations mandates: British Cameroons; British Togoland; Palestine; → Transjordan; Tanganyika; The British Crown (but not the UK) had sovereignty over the following crown dependencies: (Note: Guernsey is part of the Channel Islands and was under German occupation from June 9, 1940 until it was liberated on May 9, 1945.) Guernsey – Bailiwick of Guernsey, with two dependencies: Alderney; Sark; Isle of Man; Jersey (Note: Guernsey is part of the Channel Islands and was under German occupation from June 9, 1940 until it was liberated on May 9, 1945.) – Bailiwick of Jersey
United States – United States of America; Capital: Washington, D.C.	Widely recognized independent state. UN member state from October 4, 1945. The United States had sovereignty over: Alaska – Alaska Territory (Territory); (United States) American Samoa – Territory of American Samoa (Territory); (United States) Baker Island (uninhabited territory); (United States) Bonin Islands (Occupied territory, from September 3, 1945); Canton and Enderbury Islands (Condominium of the United Kingdom and the United States); (United States) Clipperton Island (Occupied territory, to 1945); → Guam – Territory of Guam (unincorporated territory to December 10, 1941, from August 10, 1944); Hawaii – Territory of Hawaii (unincorporated territory); (United States) Howland Island (uninhabited territory); (United States) Jarvis Island (uninhabited territory); (United States) Johnston Atoll (uninhabited territory); (United States) Kingman Reef (uninhabited territory); Southern Korea (occupied territory, from 1945 to 17 August 1948); (United States) Midway Atoll (uninhabited territory); (United States) Navassa Island (uninhabited territory); (United States) Palmyra Atoll (unincorporated organized territory); Panama Canal Zone (Territory); Philippine Commonwealth (unincorporated organized commonwealth to March 12, 1942, from February 27, 1945 to July 4, 1946); Puerto Rico (Territory); Ryukyu Islands – United States Military Government of the Ryukyu Islands (Occupied territory, from April 3, 1945); United States Virgin Islands (Territory); (United States) Volcano Islands (Occupied territory, from September 3, 1945); (United States) Wake Island (uninhabited territory, from September 4, 1945)
Uruguay – Oriental Republic of Uruguay; Capital: Montevideo	Widely recognized independent state. LON member state to December 18, 1945. UN member state from December 18, 1945.
=== V ===
Vatican City – Vatican City State; Capital: Vatican City	Widely recognized independent state.
Venezuela – United States of Venezuela; Capital: Caracas	Widely recognized independent state.
=== Y ===
Yemen – Mutawakkilite Kingdom of Yemen; Capital: Sana'a	Widely recognized independent state.
→ → Yugoslavia (to April 6, 1941, from November 29, 1943); Capital: Belgrade: Kingdom of Yugoslavia (to April 6, 1941); Democratic Federal Yugoslavia (from November 29, 1943 to November 29, 1945); Federal People's Republic of Yugoslavia (from November 29, 1945)	Widely recognized independent state. UN member state from October 24, 1945. Under occupation by Nazi Germany from April 6, 1941 to May 25, 1945. A government in exile was regarded as the legitimate government by the Allies.

== Other entities ==
Excluded from the list above are the following noteworthy entities which either were mostly unrecognized, not fully sovereign or did not claim to be independent:

Name and capital city	Information on status and recognition of sovereignty
Azad Hind – Provisional Government of Free India (from 21 October 1943 to 18 August 1945); Capital: New Delhi (claimed), Singapore (de facto), Port Blair (provisional)	Organized and recognized by Indian nationalists in-exile during the Japanese occupation of Singapore. Recognized by Axis powers member states.
Azerbaijan People's Government (from 20 November 1945 to 12 December 1946); Capital: Tabriz	Unrecognized satellite state of the Soviet Union during the Iran crisis. Claimed by Iran.
(Myanmar) Burma – State of Burma (from 1 August 1943 to 19 August 1945); Capital: Rangoon	Organized and recognized by Japanese military during the Japanese occupation. Recognized by Axis powers member states.
→ (Taiwan) China, National Government of – National Government of the Republic of China (from 30 March 1940 to 16 August 1945); Capital: Nanjing	Organized and recognized by Japanese military, combined Reformed Government and Provisional Government together. Recognized by Axis powers member states.
China, Provisional Government of – Provisional Government of the Republic of China (to 30 March 1940); Capital: Beijing	Organized and recognized by Japanese military authority during the Second Sino-Japanese War.
China, Reformed Government of – Reformed Government of the Republic of China (to 30 March 1940); Capital: Nanjing	Organized and recognized by Japanese military authority during the Second Sino-Japanese War.
China, People's Republic of (from 1 October 1949); Capital: Beijing	Partially recognized de facto independent state. The Republic of China claimed to be the sole legitimate government of China (from 1 October 1949), but only administered the mainland. It also claimed the Paracel Islands (disputed by the Republic of China and South Vietnam), the Spratly Islands (disputed by the Republic of China, South Vietnam, and the Philippines), and South Tibet (controlled by India's North-East Frontier Agency).
Croatia – Independent State of Croatia (from 10 April 1941 to 25 May 1945); Capital: Zagreb	Organized and recognized by German military authority during the invasion of Yugoslavia. Recognized by Axis powers member states.
Cyrenaica – Emirate of Cyrenaica (from 1 March 1949); Capital: Benghazi	Unilaterally proclaimed independent Senussi emirate from 1 March 1949, backed by the United Kingdom.
Democratic Finland – Finnish Democratic Republic (to 12 March 1940); Capital: Helsinki (official), Terijoki (de facto)	Partially recognized socialist republic. Puppet state of the Soviet Union.
East Indonesia (from 24 December 1946 to 27 December 1949); Capital: Makassar: State of the Great East (from 24 December 1946 to 27 December 1946); State of East Indonesia (from 27 December 1946 to 27 December 1949)	Puppet state established by the Netherlands during the Indonesian National Revolution. Joined the United States of Indonesia as part of a peace deal on 27 December 1949.
East Java – State of East Java (from 26 November 1948 to 27 December 1949)	Puppet state established by the Netherlands during the Indonesian National Revolution. Joined the United States of Indonesia as part of a peace deal on 27 December 1949.
East Sumatra – State of East Sumatra (from 25 December 1947 to 27 December 1949); Capital: Medan	Established by the Netherlands after the reoccupation of North Sumatra in July 1947. Joined the United States of Indonesia as part of a peace deal on 27 December 1949.
East Turkestan – East Turkestan Republic (from 12 November 1944 to 22 December 1949); Capital: Ghulja	Satellite state of the Soviet Union from November 12, 1944 to December 22, 1949, when it was conquered by China.
Germany, East – German Democratic Republic (from 7 October 1949); Capital: East Berlin (disputed)	Widely recognized state under Soviet occupation.
Germany, West – Federal Republic of Germany (from 23 May 1949); Capital: Bonn	Widely-recognized state under Allied occupation. West Germany was a federation of eleven states.: West Berlin (from 23 May 1949) was a political enclave that was closely aligned with – but not actually a part of – West Germany. It consisted of three occupied sectors administered by the United States, the United Kingdom, and France.
(Hyderabad State) Hyderabad – State of Hyderabad (from 15 August 1947 to 17 December 1948); Capital: Hyderabad	Unrecognized de-facto independent state.
Indonesia – Emergency Government of the Republic of Indonesia (from 19 December 1948 to 13 July 1949); Capital: Bidar Alam	Organized and recognized by Indonesian Republicans after the Netherlands occupied the at the time capital city of Yogyakarta in Central Java, the location of the temporary Republican capital during the Indonesian National Revolution.
Inner Mongolia – Inner Mongolian People's Republic (from 9 September 1945 to 6 November 1945); Capital: Sonid Right Banner	Unrecognized de-facto independent state.
Italian Social Republic (from 23 September 1943 to 2 May 1945); Capital: Salò	Puppet state of Germany, independent to the Kingdom of Italy.
Kampuchea – Kingdom of Kampuchea (from 13 March 1945 to 16 October 1945); Capital: Phnom Penh	Organized and recognized by Japan military authority during the Japanese coup d'etat in French Indochina. Recognized by Axis powers member states.
Korea – People's Republic of Korea (from 12 September 1945 to 8 February 1946); Capital: Seoul	Interim transitional state.
Korea, Provisional Government of – Provisional Government of the Republic of Korea (to 8 September 1945); Capital-in-exile: Qijiang (to 1940), Chongqing (from 1940)	Partially recognized Korean government-in-exile.
(Laos) Lao Issara – Kingdom of Laos (from 12 October 1945 to 24 April 1946); Capital: Vientiane	Unrecognized de-facto independent state.
Lokot Autonomy (from 15 November 1941 to 26 August 1944); Capital: Lokot	Autonomous republic in the occupied territories of the Bryansk, Oryol and Kursk Oblasts of the Soviet Union formed by German troops.
Luang Prabang – Kingdom of Luang Prabang (from 8 April 1945 to 12 October 1945); Capital: Luang Prabang	Organized and recognized by Japan military authority during the Japanese coup d'etat in French Indochina. Recognized by Axis powers member states.
Madura – State of Madura (from 23 January 1948 to 27 December 1949)	Puppet state established by the Netherlands during the Indonesian National Revolution. Joined the United States of Indonesia as part of a peace deal on 27 December 1949.
Mahabad – Republic of Mahabad (from 22 January 1946 to 15 December 1946); Capital: Mahabad	Unrecognized satellite state of the Soviet Union established during the Iran crisis. Claimed by Iran.
Manchukuo (to 17 August 1945); Capital: Changchun (to 9 August 1945), Tonghua (from 9 August 1945)	Organized and recognized by Japanese military authority after the Mukden incident. Recognized by Axis powers member states and several neutral states.
Manipur – Kingdom of Manipur (from 14 August 1947 to 15 October 1949); Capital: Imphal	Unrecognized de-facto independent state.
Mengjiang – Mongolian Autonomous State (to 19 August 1945); Capital: Zhangbei: Menjiang United Autonomous Government (to 4 August 1941); Mongolian Autonomous State (from 4 August 1941)	Organized and recognized by Japan military authority during the Second Sino-Japanese War. Recognized by Axis powers member states.
Palestine – All-Palestine Protectorate (from 22 September 1948); Capital: Jerusalem (claimed), Gaza City (until December 1948, provisional), Cairo (from December 1948, provisional)	Partially recognized de facto independent state. Recognized by six Arab League states.
→ Pasundan (from 4 May 1947 to July 1947, from 26 February 1948 to 27 December 1949); Capital: Bandoeng: Pasundan Republic (from 4 May 1947 to July 1947); State of Pasundan (from 26 February 1948 to 27 December 1949)	Puppet state established by the Netherlands during the Indonesian National Revolution. Joined the United States of Indonesia as part of a peace deal on 27 December 1949.
(Second Philippine Republic) Philippines – Second Philippine Republic (from 14 October 1943 to 17 August 1945); Capital: Manila (from 14 October 1943 to 3 March 1945), Baguio (from 3 March 1945)	De facto independent state; considered to be a puppet state of Japan.
Slovakia – Slovak Republic (to 4 April 1945); Capital: Bratislava	Organized and recognized by German military after the Munich Agreement. Recognized by Axis powers member states and several neutral states.
South Sumatra – State of South Sumatra (from 30 August 1948 to 27 December 1949); Capital: Palembang	Puppet state established by the Netherlands during the Indonesian National Revolution. Joined the United States of Indonesia as part of a peace deal on 27 December 1949.
→ → Tannu Tuva – Tuvan People's Republic (to 1 November 1944); Capital: Kyzyl	Partially recognized satellite state of the Soviet Union. Absorbed into the Soviet Union on 1 November 1944.
Tibet; Capital: Lhasa	Partially recognized de facto independent state. Claimed by the Republic of China and by the People's Republic of China.
Trieste – Free Territory of Trieste (from 10 February 1947); Capital: Trieste	Independent territory under direct responsibility of the United Nations Security Council.
Tripura – Kingdom of Tripura (from 13 August 1947 to September 9, 1949); Capital: Agartala	Unrecognized de-facto independent state.
→ Vietnam – Empire of Vietnam (from 11 March 1945 to 25 August 1945); Capital: Huế	Organized and recognized by Japan military authority during the Japanese coup d'etat in French Indochina. Recognized by Axis powers member states.
Vietnam, Democratic Republic of – Democratic Republic of Vietnam (from 2 September 1945); Capital: Hanoi	Partially recognized independent state.
Vietnam, State of – State of Vietnam (from 2 July 1949); Capital: Saigon-Cholon: Provisional Central Government of Vietnam (from 27 May 1948 to 2 July 1949)	Organized and recognized by France during the First Indochina War.

=== Entities not claiming independence ===
- Austria (from 27 April 1945) was divided into four zones of occupation by France, the United Kingdom, the United States, and the Soviet Union. The Soviets quickly formed a new provisional government, which was recognized by the rest of the occupying nations in October 1945. In 1946, the occupying powers substantially loosened their dominance over the Austrian government, with a unanimous vote of the four occupying powers required to overturn a decision of the Austrian Parliament.
- Germany (from 5 June 1945 to 23 May 1949) was divided into four zones of occupation by France, the United Kingdom, the United States, and the Soviet Union. The four occupying powers administered Germany through the Allied Control Council, through which they asserted sovereign authority over it. The Allied Control Council ceased to function after the Soviet Union withdrew from it in 1948. On 23 May 1949, the Federal Republic of Germany was formed in the American, British, and French occupation zone, followed by the German Democratic Republic in the Soviet occupation zone on 7 October 1949.
- Poland (from 1 January 1940 to 31 December 1944) was occupied by Nazi Germany following the Invasion of Poland, which saw the overthrow of the Second Polish Republic. Polish territories not annexed by Germany and the Soviet Union were administered as a zone of occupation by Germany known as the General Government. Polish areas annexed by the Soviet Union were added to the area of the General Government following Operation Barbarossa. Throughout this time, the Polish government-in-exile was maintained from abroad and exerted significant influence in Poland through the Polish Underground State and its military arm, the Home Army. The General Government collapsed in the closing stages of World War II as Soviet forces conquered the territory from the Germans. The Provisional Government of the Republic of Poland was created on 31 December 1944.
- Estonia was incorporated into the Soviet Union in 1940, but the legality of the annexation was not widely recognized. The Baltic diplomatic services in the West continued to be recognised as representing the de jure state.
- Latvia was incorporated into the Soviet Union in 1940, but the legality of the annexation was not widely recognized. The Baltic diplomatic services in the West continued to be recognised as representing the de jure state.
- Lithuania was incorporated into the Soviet Union in 1940, but the legality of the annexation was not widely recognized. The Baltic diplomatic services in the West continued to be recognised as representing the de jure state.
- The Saudi Arabian–Iraqi neutral zone was a strip of neutral territory between Iraq and Saudi Arabia.
- The Saudi Arabian–Kuwaiti neutral zone was a strip of neutral territory between Kuwait and Saudi Arabia.
- The Sovereign Military Order of Malta was an entity claiming sovereignty. The order had bi-lateral diplomatic relations with a large number of states, but had no territory other than extraterritorial areas within Rome. Although the order frequently asserted its sovereignty, it did not claim to be a sovereign state. It lacked a defined territory. Since all its members were citizens of other states, almost all of them lived in their native countries, and those who resided in the order's extraterritorial properties in Rome did so only in connection with their official duties, the order lacked the characteristic of having a permanent population.
- Tangier was an international zone under the joint administration of France, Spain, the United Kingdom, Italy, Portugal and Belgium. Under Spanish occupation from 14 June 1940 to 11 October 1945.
- The United States Army Military Government in Korea administered the southern half of Korea from September 1945 to 15 August 1948, when its territory became part of the new South Korean state.
