= List of heads of state of the United States of Indonesia =

This article lists the heads of state of the United States of Indonesia, a short-lived federal state which existed from 17 December 1949 to 17 August 1950. The heads of state held different titles depending upon their constituent state. Each constituent state had the same head of state throughout the short existence of the federation.

This list does not include autonomous and unrecognized regions.

State	Name	Title	Term of office		Duration
United States of Indonesia	Sukarno	President	17 December 1949 (Note: The United States of Indonesia was officially established on 27 December 1949.)	17 August 1950 (Note: Date of the dissolution of the United States of Indonesia. Sukarno would concurrently serve as the President of the Republic of Indonesia after Assaat resigned in 15 August 1950.)	243 days
Republic of Indonesia	Assaat	Acting President	27 December 1949	15 August 1950	231 days
State of East Indonesia	Tjokorda Gde Raka Soekawati	President	24 December 1946	17 August 1950 (Note: Date of the dissolution of the State of East Indonesia.)	3 years, 236 days
State of Pasundan	Wiranatakusumah V	Wali Negara	24 April 1948	10 February 1950 (Note: Resignantion offered 30 January 1948, effective 10 February)	1 year, 292 days
State of East Sumatra	Tengku Mansur	Wali Negara	29 January 1948	17 August 1950 (Note: Date of the dissolution of the State of East Sumatra.)	2 years, 200 days
State of South Sumatra	Abdul Malik	Wali Negara	28 December 1948	18 March 1950	1 year, 90 days
State of East Java	Achmad Kusumonegoro	Wali Negara	1 December 1948	9 March 1950	1 year, 47 days
State of Madura	Tjakraningrat XII	Wali Negara	20 February 1948	1 February 1950	1 year, 346 days

== Bibliography ==
- Abdullah, Taufik; Mulyani, Nani; Djumadiono, Didik; Salman, Budi (1995), 50 Tahun Indonesia Merdeka:1945-1965 (in Indonesian), Jakarta: Citra Media Persada
- Feith, Herbert (2007) [1962]. The Decline of Constitutional Democracy in Indonesia. Singapore: Equininox Publishing (Asia) Pte Ltd. ISBN 978-979-3780-45-0.
- Helius, Sjamsuddin; Ekadjati, Edi S.; Marlina, Kuswiah; Wiwi, Ietje (1992), Menuju Negara Kesatuan: Negara Pasundan (PDF), Jakarta: Ministry of Education and Culture
- Ide Anak Agung Gde Agung (1996) [1995]. From the Formation of the State of East Indonesia Towards the Establishment of the United States of Indonesia. Translated by Owens, Linda. Yayasan Obor. ISBN 979-461-216-2.
- Government of East Sumatra (1948), Pemandangan ringkas ekonomi dan tata Negara Soematera Timoer, Medan: Druk Varekamp
- Kahin, George McTurnan (1952), Nationalism and Revolution in Indonesia, Ithaca, New York: Cornell University Press
- 1948 selajang pandang: setahun perdjuangan kearah pembangunan, keamanan, ketenteraman dan kesedjahteraan Indonesia (in Indonesian), Jakarta: Regeringsvoorlichtingsdienst, 1949
- Tim Penyusun Sejarah (1970), Seperempat Abad Dewan Perwakilan Rakyat Republik Indonesia [A Quarter Century of the People's Representative Council of the Republic of Indonesia] (PDF) (in Indonesian), Jakarta: Sekretariat DPR-GR
