= Netherlands-Indonesia Union =

Confederation of the Netherlands and Indonesia (1949–56)

Netherlands-Indonesia Union Nederlands-Indonesische Unie (Dutch) Uni Indonesia–Belanda (Indonesian)
- 1949–1956
- Flag of the Netherlands and Indonesia (Note: Both flags are treated equally and used within their respective territories.)

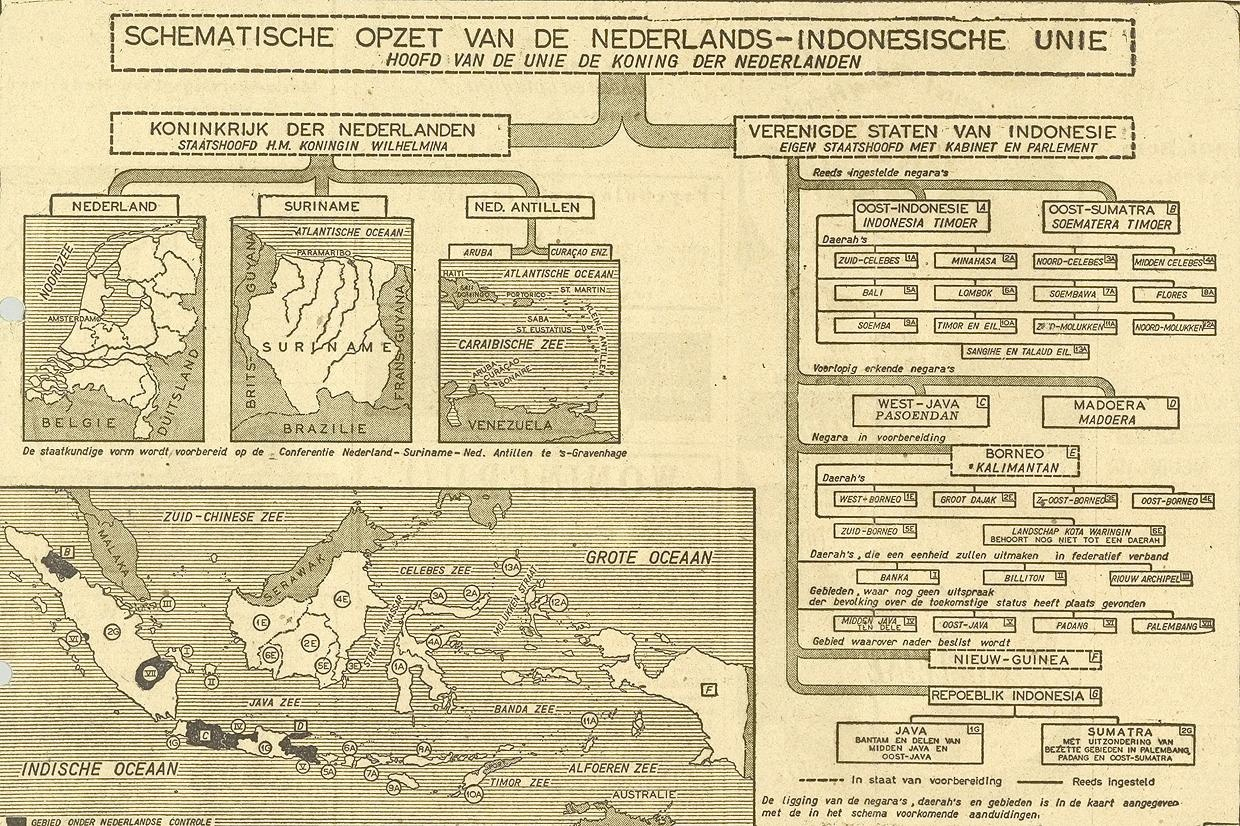
- Schematic layout of the Netherlands-Indonesia Union
- Status: Confederation between the Netherlands and Indonesia
- Capital: Amsterdam; Jakarta
- Secretariat: The Hague
- Common languages: Indonesian; Dutch; Indigenous languages
- Religion: Sunni Islam; Christianity; Hinduism; Buddhism
- Hoofd der Unie (Head of the Union)
  - 1949–1956: Juliana
- Director General
  - 1949‒1956: P. J. A. Idenburg
- History
  - Established: 1 January 1949
  - Transfer of sovereignty: 27 December 1949
  - NIU Ministers conference: 24 March 1950
  - Sukarno dissolves the Union: 17 August 1954 (Note: Dissolved in name only; after Sukarno's speech.)
  - Charter for the Kingdom of the Netherlands: 15 December 1954
  - Union dissolved (in Indonesia): 15 February 1956 (Note: Indonesia issued UU No. 13 Tahun 1956 (Act Number 13/1956), the act nullified any Netherlands-Indonesia Union formal relations and conferences, the act was in effect from 15/16 February 1956.)
  - Union dissolved (in the Netherlands): February 1956

Area
- 1956: 2,111,219 km^{2} (815,146 sq mi)

Population
  - 1949 estimate: 84,000,000
Preceded by	Succeeded by
Netherlands; United States of Indonesia	Netherlands; Republic of Indonesia

The Netherlands-Indonesia Union (Dutch: Nederlands-Indonesische Unie, NIU; Indonesian: Uni Indonesia–Belanda, UIB), also called the two-state solution (Dutch: tweestaten-oplossing) by the Dutch, was a confederal relationship between the Netherlands and Indonesia that existed between 1949 and 1956. Agreed in 1949, it was an attempt by the Netherlands to continue to bind its former colony of the Dutch East Indies (now Indonesia) to the Netherlands in a confederal manner, at least within the framework of a personal union, even after independence had been granted. However, it was less effective than the French Union of around the same time and less enduring than the British Commonwealth. The loose union failed primarily due to the dispute over Dutch New Guinea and was cancelled by Indonesia in 1954, although it continued to exist de jure until 1956.

== Initial situation ==
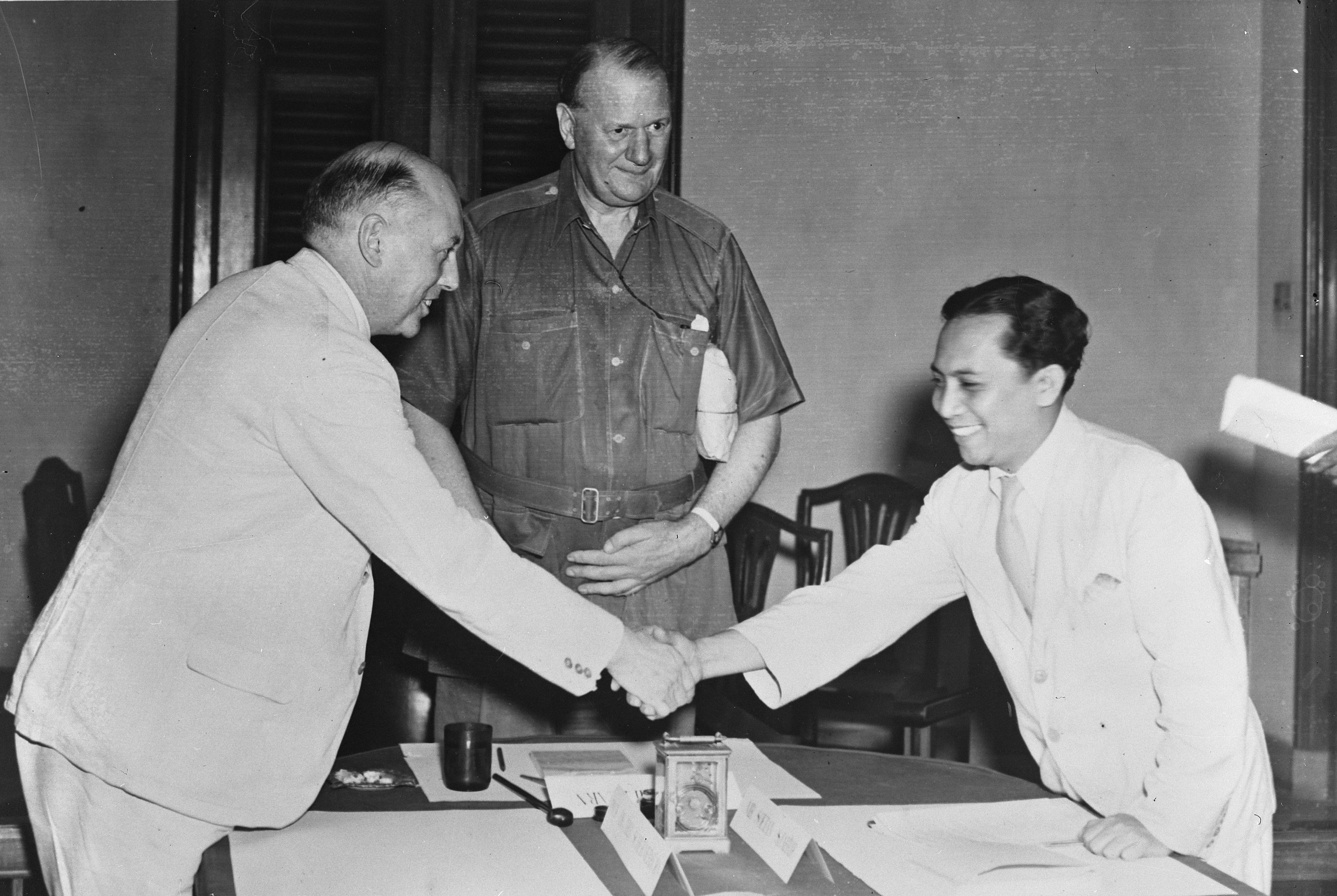
Linggarjati Agreement from left to right: Wim Schermerhorn, Lord Killearn, and Sutan Sjahrir.

In the Indonesian War of Independence, which broke out after the withdrawal of the Japanese occupying forces in 1945, the Dutch policy of constantly alternating between rounds of negotiations and repeated counter-offensives led to a military stalemate; in terms of foreign policy, the Netherlands became increasingly isolated. The nationalists of the Republic of Indonesia controlled the majority of the most populous islands of Java, Sumatra and Madura, while the Netherlands wanted to establish a federal republic of the United States of Indonesia on the remaining islands with the help of collaborators, which in turn was to remain confederately linked to the Dutch Kingdom (consisting of the Netherlands, Suriname/Guayana and the Antilles). In this way, the Dutch government wanted to retain control over Indonesia's security, foreign and economic policy.

On 15 November 1946, the Linggadjati Agreement was signed between the Netherlands and the soon-to-be independent Dutch East Indies, which stated that the Dutch colonies would become an independent nation called 'the United States of Indonesia'. A Netherlands-Indonesian Union was established "to promote their common interests." Due to a military dispute, the execution of the agreement did not take place. The Roman/Red First Beel cabinet was hesitant on its approval, especially on its implications for the Dutch Kingdom, such like the idea of drafting a new constitution of a new Netherlands-Indonesian Union to replace the Kingdom of the Netherlands's constitution, the role of the Monarch, and New Guinea. The ministers of the Labor party (PvdA) supported it, though some members of the government, particularly from the right-wing opposition, expressed concerns of a 'broken crown'; that the agreement might lead to a break-up of the kingdom, especially if it went beyond the initially prescribed solution within the kingdom. This led to different interpretations which led to the stalling of its ratification within the Dutch government for a weeks without a solution.

Those of the Catholic People's Party (KVP) objected to the symbolic role and non-binding nature of the Dutch-Indonesian Union to be established. Carl Romme, then leader of the KVP, believed in an interpretation of a 'heavy' union. Romme envisioned a 'transformation' of the kingdom towards a royal union as a sovereign 'super state', led by the Dutch monarch, serving the higher-level common interests of its constituent parts. The KVP's support of the union went as far as making it one of the party's commitments during the proposed transfer of sovereignty to Indonesia for the 1948 Dutch general election. On 25 March 1947, with increasing pressure from the KVP, the Dutch House of Representatives adopted the Romme-Van der Goes van Naters motion with the support of the socialists and communists. Romme's interpretation was not well-received by the Republic of Indonesia, as it was seen as attempting a one-sided interpretation of the Linggadjati Agreement. After the Netherlands had signed a truce with the Republic of Indonesia, the Netherlands-Indonesia Union was established on 1 January 1949 and the transfer of sovereignty took place on 27 December 1949.

== Problems within the union ==
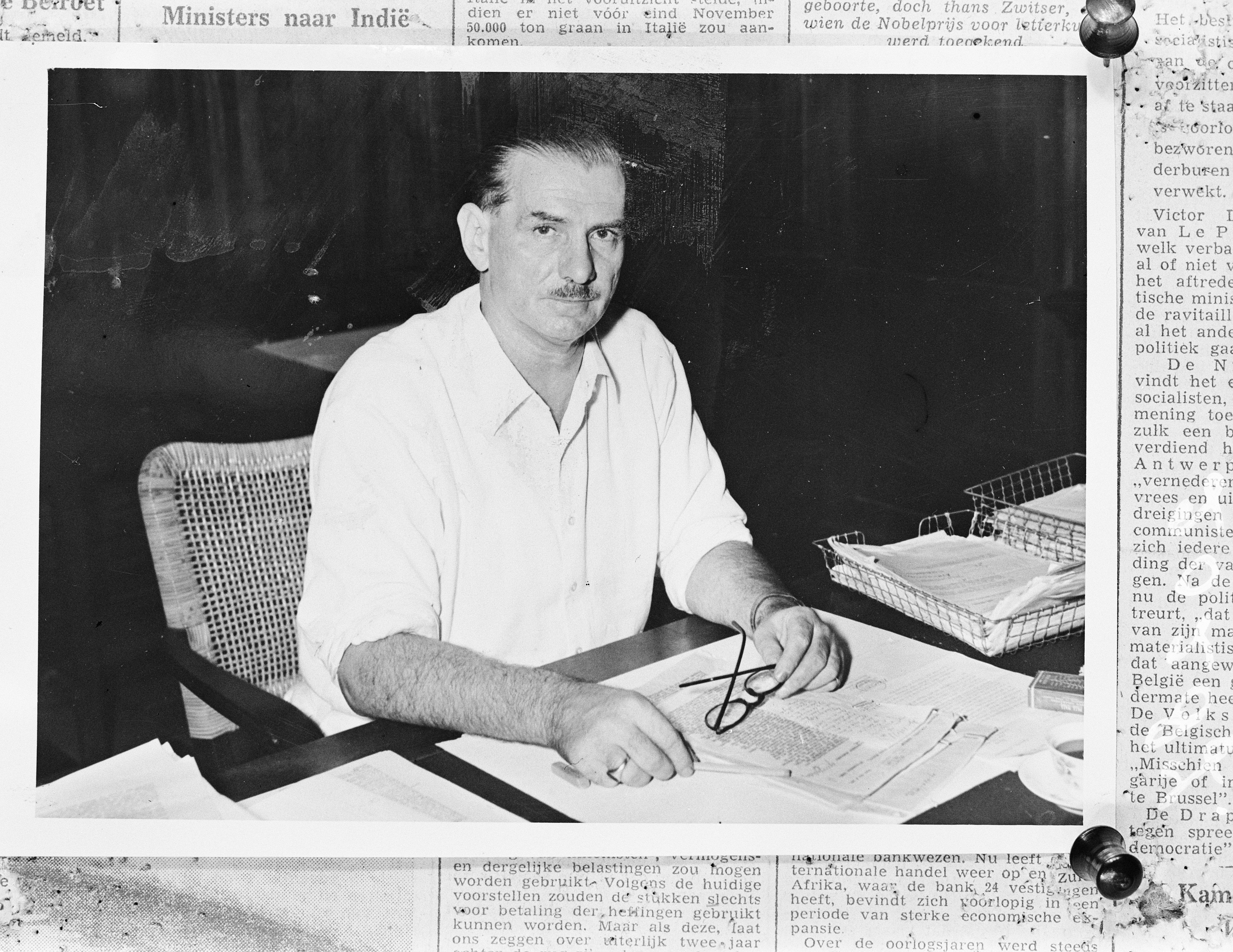
Dr. Petrus Johannes Abram Idenburg (1896-1976) during his time in the Indies as Director General of General Affairs, February 5, 1947

In December 1949, Indonesia became independent and the union with the Netherlands came into force. However, Indonesia was very poorly prepared for independence. The Dutch school system had only educated a very small, European-educated elite; of a population of well over 70 million at the time, just 591 had a university degree. There was a lack of both managers and civil servants. Without enough local managers and local capital, it was not possible to nationalise the Dutch plantations, factories, oil fields and banks, so that even after independence the most important economic sectors remained in Dutch (and in some cases British, Australian and US) hands. In order to keep the administrative apparatus operational, 17,000 Dutch civil servants and advisors remained in the country. The joint Union bodies agreed in the Linggadjati Agreement of 1946, which were to coordinate foreign policy, foreign trade and monetary policy during the transition period, were no longer provided for in the Union Treaty of 1949. The Union only had a secretariat. The director of this secretariat (Secretary-General) was the Dutchman Petrus Johannes Abraham Idenburg, whose father Alexander Willem Frederik Idenburg had once been Governor-General of the Netherlands Indies.

Unlike in the French Union, for example, no common citizenship of the Union was created, but it was agreed that citizens of the Netherlands and Indonesia would be treated equally in the other country. In the medium and long term, this could have led to the problem of immigration of millions of Indonesians for the Netherlands, who would also have the right to vote. In 1949, the Netherlands had barely 10 million inhabitants, while Indonesia already had over 76 million.

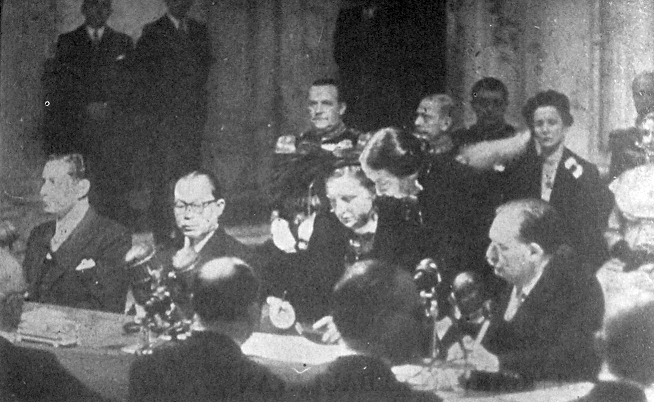
Queen Juliana and Mohammad Hatta sign the Hague Agreement in 1949

Theoretically, Queen Juliana was to be the joint head of state of both the Netherlands and Indonesia, similar to the British Commonwealth. However, Indonesia emphasized its sovereignty and republican character, and Sukarno had himself elected President of Indonesia in 1949. Within the federal republic of the United States of Indonesia, the nationalist Republic of Indonesia dominated, and as early as 1950, President Sukarno transformed the federation into a unitary state. However, after the collapse of the Indonesian federation, the Netherlands was not prepared to hand over West New Guinea, which had initially been excluded from the Hague Agreement of 1949 (to be settled within a year), to the Indonesian unitary state and only offered to place West New Guinea under the jurisdiction of the Union, which would have effectively meant the continuation of Dutch rule.

=== Ministerial conference of 1950 ===
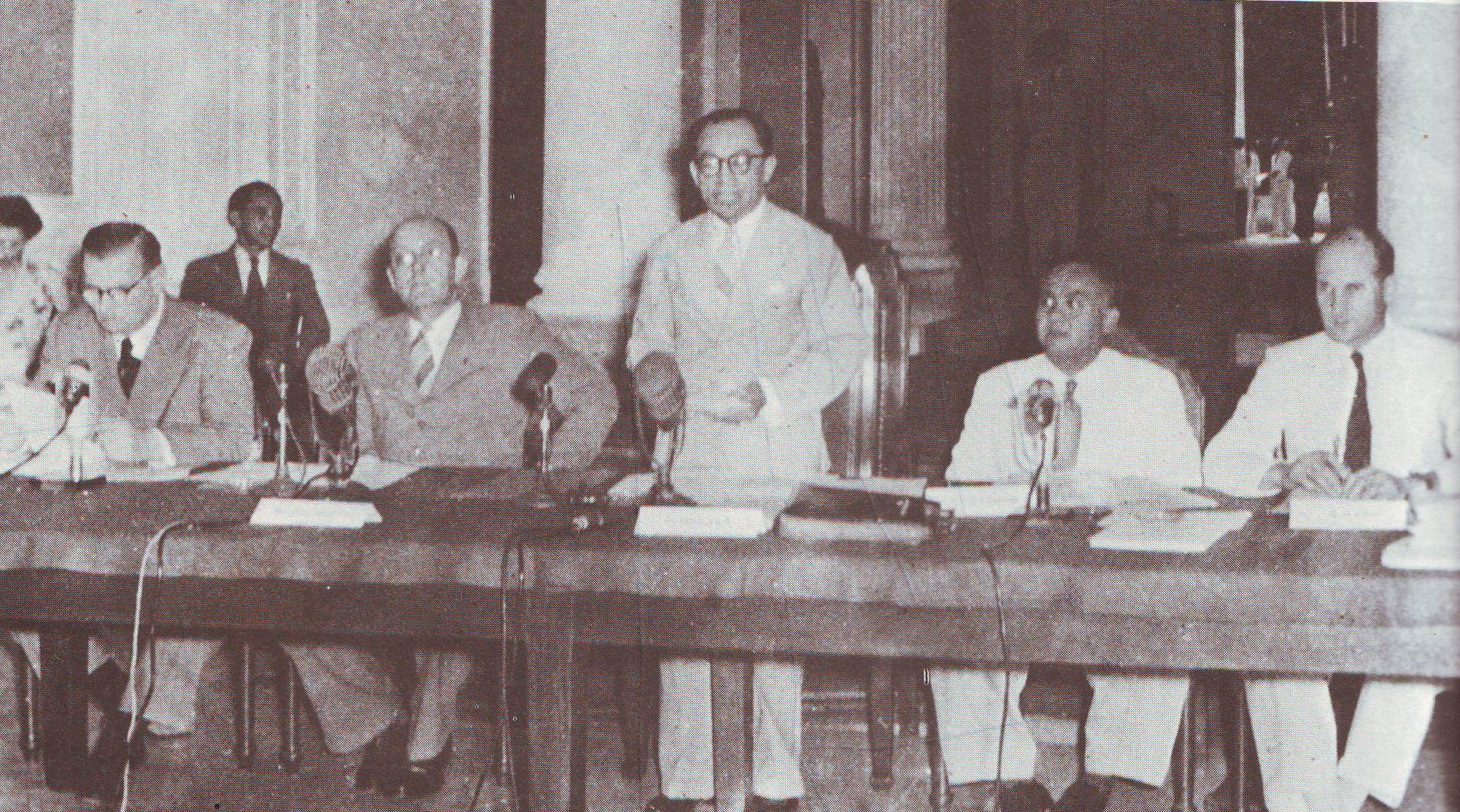
Mohammad Hatta at the Ministerial Conference of the Netherlands-Indonesia Union in Jakarta, March 24, 1950

As agreed, a year after the signing of the Hague Agreement, on March 24, 1950, the Ministerial Conference of the Indonesian-Dutch Union was held in Jakarta. Attended by Dutch ministers who flew from the Netherlands, the meeting was intended to celebrate the continued cordial bond of Dutch-Indonesian relations and to discuss the results of the Round Table Conference. However, the meeting went sour as Indonesia pressed the Netherlands to immediately withdraw from the West Irian dispute. The abrupt change in attitude might be attributed to the confidence gained from the successes of Indonesian diplomacy in pressuring the Dutch to make concessions, coupled with the perceived Dutch isolation following the fallout of the Dutch Military Aggressions on the international world stage. No solution could be reached by negotiation, and the Union gradually collapsed over the dispute about West New Guinea.

== End and dissolution ==
In a speech on August 17, 1954, celebrating the 9th anniversary of Indonesian Independence, President Sukarno unilaterally dissolved the Union, citing it as a hindrance to Indonesian progress. He further stated that, "For a fighting nation there is no journey's end."

In September 1955, Queen Juliana also announced the imminent end of the Union in a speech from the throne. The Dutch government (Cabinet Drees II) made its agreement to the dissolution of the Union dependent on the settlement of certain economic and financial matters, such as the debt issue and continued investment protection for Dutch companies. Until February 1956, negotiations on this issue and on an amendment to the Union Treaty continued, but were unsuccessful in view of the unresolved dispute over West New Guinea. The Indonesian parliament then formally proclaimed the end of the Union and the expiry of all bilateral agreements with the Netherlands on 15 February 1956 by issuing an act titled UU No. 13 Tahun 1956 (Act Number 13/1956), the act nullified any Netherlands-Indonesia Union formal relations and the related agreements of the round table conference. In the Netherlands, the General Secretariat was dissolved in 1956 and the Union was removed from the constitution, and with it, the financial and economic parts of the Hague Agreement. The debts accepted at the Hague Agreement were no longer repaid. The same applied to the (partial) pension payments that Indonesia had to make. After the dissolution, the relationship with the Netherlands deteriorated rapidly within months.

== Structure ==
Published text of the Uniestatuut, as part of the UNTS, which lays out the Union’s character and aims.

The Netherlands-Indonesia Union would be a Dutch equivalent of the French Union or the British Commonwealth. The Union would consist of two independent and sovereign partners:

1. the Kingdom of the Netherlands, consisting of
  1. The Netherlands
  2. Suriname
  3. The Netherlands Antilles
  4. Netherlands New Guinea
2. the United States of Indonesia (later Republic of Indonesia), comprising seven federal states.
  1. Republic of Indonesia
  2. State of East Indonesia
  3. State of East Java
  4. State of East Sumatra
  5. Madura
  6. Pasundan
  7. State of South Sumatra

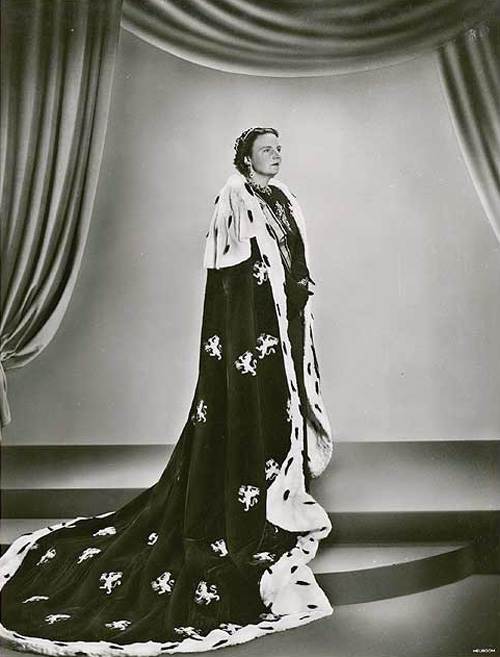
Her Majesty, Queen Juliana, Head of the Netherlands-Indonesia Union

The status of Netherlands New Guinea should be discussed further. Preliminarily, New Guinea remained under Dutch rule. And, where Suriname and the Antilles would be equal partners (federated states) in the Kingdom, New Guinea would remain a colony. The Head of the Union (Hoofd der Unie) would be Queen Juliana, in which her majesty's role would be that of a figurehead, akin to the current role of the Head of the Commonwealth. The collaboration would take place in the following areas:

- Defense and training
- Foreign relations
- Finance
- Economic relations
- Cultural relations

To accomplish this, various organs would be created. Firstly, a conference of ministers had to be held every six months. Secondly, a permanent secretariat was established in The Hague. Each partner would choose a Secretary-General, who would each year take the leadership of the Secretariat. (From 1950 this was P. J. A. Idenburg for the Netherlands, who would remain such until the arrangement was dissolved in 1956.) Finally, there was a Union-Court of Arbitration set up to judge disputes between the Netherlands and Indonesia.

== Sources ==
- Nijhoffs Geschiedenislexicon Nederland en België, compiled by H.W.J. Volmuller in collaboration with the editors of De Grote Oosthoek, The Hague‑Antwerp 1981.
- John Jansen van Galen: Fiasco van goede bedoelingen: Nederland en de Indonesische onafhankelijkheid. Uitgeverij Pluim, 2019, ISBN 978-94-92928-75-7

== See also ==
- Austria-Hungary
- French Union
- French Community
- British Commonwealth
