= Hague Agreement Between Netherlands-Indonesia =

1949 treaty between the Netherlands and Indonesia

The Hague Agreement, also called the Round Table Conference Agreement, is a treaty ratified on November 2, 1949, between the Netherlands and the Republic of Indonesia, that attempted to bring to an end the Dutch-Indonesian conflict that followed the proclamation of Indonesian independence in 1945. After prolonged disagreement over its provisions, the treaty was revoked in 1956.

== Provisions ==
According to the treaty, the Dutch agreed to transfer, by December 30, 1949 (transfer was made on Dec. 27, 1949), their political sovereignty over the entire territory of the former Dutch East Indies, with the exception of West New Guinea (West Irian), to the Republic of the United States of Indonesia, which was to be a federal government formed of the republican state and the 15 autonomous states created by the Dutch. This new republic together with the Netherlands established a Netherlands-Indonesian Union, which was intended to work for the common interest. In return for Dutch political concessions, the new republic gave a guarantee to Dutch investors in the region and accepted the debt of 4.3 billion guilders. The status of West New Guinea was to be settled in discussions to take place the following year.

The Hague Agreement apparently benefited the Netherlands, but Indonesian nationalists were dissatisfied with certain articles in the agreement, especially those dealing with the nature of the state, the dominant role of the autonomous Dutch states, the debt, and the West New Guinea problem. The dissatisfied nationalists drafted a provisional constitution in 1950 and established Indonesia as a unitary state. The conflict between the Dutch and the Indonesian nationalists continued, and on April 21, 1956, the Indonesian parliament revoked the Hague Agreement.
