= Charles van der Plas =

Dutch colonial governor in Indonesia (1891–1977)

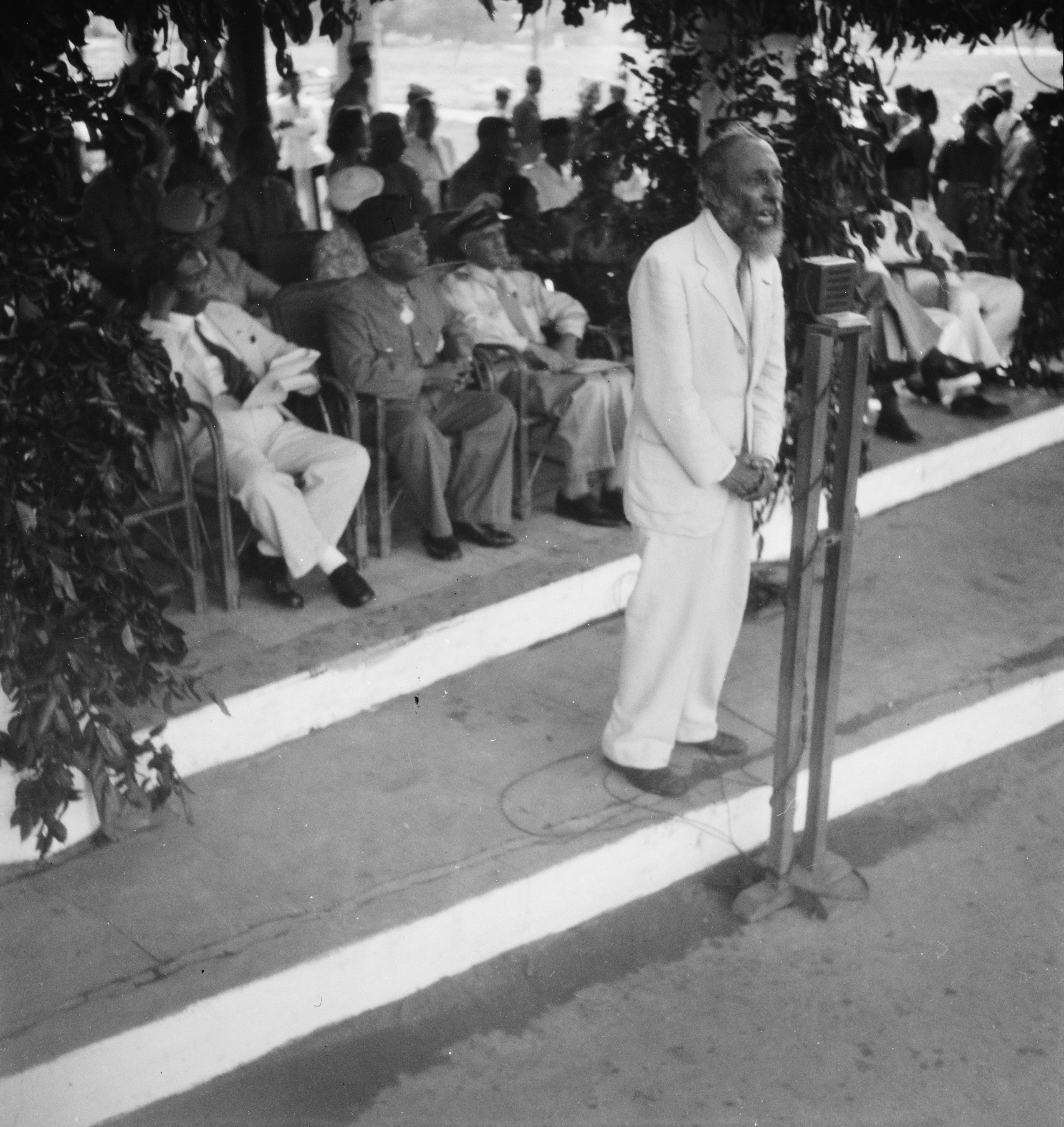
Charles van der Plas

Charles Olke van der Plas (15 May 1891, Buitenzorg – 7 June 1977, Zwolle) was an administrator in the Dutch East Indies colonial government who served as the governor of the state of East Java from 1936 to 1941. He was trained at Leiden University in the Netherlands, and joined the Dutch civil service in 1908. Van der Plas was influenced by the Dutch Islamicist scholar Christiaan Snouck Hurgronje and became an expert in Indonesian society and politics, Islam and Arabic. In this capacity he served as the Dutch consul to Jeddah in Saudi Arabia in the 1920s. Van der Plas also spoke Javanese, Sundanese and Madurese, and was deeply versed in aspects of Indonesian culture.

Following the Japanese occupation of the Dutch East Indies during World War Two, he liaised closely with anti-Japanese nationalists, including providing funds for leftist resistance forces. In 1943, he organised for Indonesian political prisoners held in camps at Boven Digoel, in West Papua, to be evacuated to Australia. In Australia, he was Chairman of the Netherlands Indies Commission in Australia and New Zealand, where he was deputy to Hubertus van Mook. He headed the Netherlands Indies Government Information Service, where he worked closely with Indonesian nationalists. He then served as deputy leader in the Netherlands Indies Civil Administration and was a key negotiator with the Allied forces for the return of Dutch control of Indonesia. Van der Plas played an important role in establishing the State of Madura, a constituent state of the federal planned Republic of the United States of Indonesia.

He was known as "the man who knew too much" by observers of the struggle for Indonesian independence, but also called "Tuan Gila", the Mad White Man, by Indonesians.

== Bibliography ==
- Kahin, George McTurnan; Audrey Kahin (2003). Southeast Asia: A Testament. London: Routledge Curzon. ISBN 0-415-29975-6.
