= Military Mission for Indonesia =

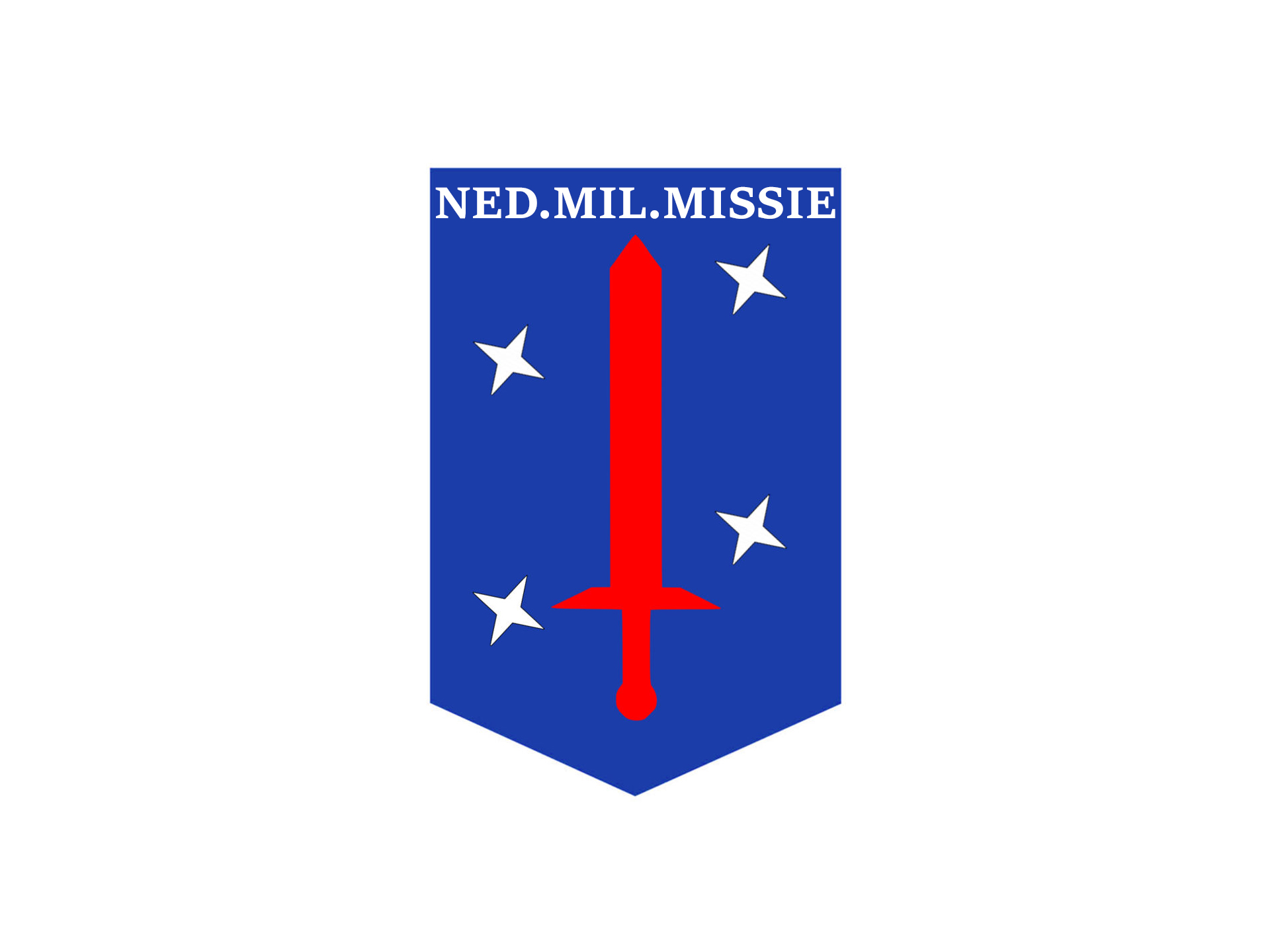
- Military Mission for Indonesia insignia
- Active: 24 March 1950–19 December 1953
- Disbanded: 10 March 1954
- Country: Netherlands
- Type: Military instruction and advisory group
- Role: Education and training of Indonesian National Armed Forces personnel
- Size: 800
- Part of: Netherlands Armed Forces
- Headquarters: Jakarta, also Bandung (KL), Surabaya (KM), and elsewhere

Commanders
- Notable commanders: Maj. Gen. A.J.A. Pereira; Lt. Col. H.A. Maurenbrecher; Lt. Col. L.B. Duitz

The Military Mission for Indonesia (Dutch: Nederlandse Militaire Missie in Indonesië; NMM, Indonesian: Misi militer Belanda di Indonesia) was a military instruction and advisory program for the Indonesian National Armed Forces by personnel of the Netherlands Armed Forces between 1950 and 1954.

== Formation ==
At the Round Table Conference (RTC) of 2 November 1949, it was agreed that, effective from the transfer of sovereignty on 27 December 1949, a Dutch military mission would become active in Indonesia to provide military-technical and organizational assistance and to assist in the development and instruction of the Indonesian National Armed Forces (Tentara Nasional Indonesia, TNI). During the first ministerial conference of the Netherlands-Indonesia Union on 24 March 1950, the foundation was laid for the establishment of the Provisional Dutch Military Mission (Voorlopige Nederlandse Militaire Missie, VNMM). The mission would consist of personnel from the Dutch naval, army, and air force branches, whose total strength was not to exceed 800 personnel.

In mid-June 1950, the VNMM was "demerged" from the Netherlands Armed Forced Command, thus gaining independent status with the authority to directly contact the relevant Indonesian authorities. Consequently, a mission headquarters was established in Jakarta on 25 June 1950, alongside a separate headquarters for the air force department. The VNMM began its task understaffed, as the military aspects of the RTC agreement had not yet been finalized, and the personnel assigned to the mission only became available gradually, as the Dutch military demobilized in the aftermath of the Indonesian National Revolution. Initially, the mission relied on volunteers as instructors and advisors, but there was little interest because the terms of their employment were not yet known. To ensure a core team for the headquarters and the departments of the three service branches, a mandatory staff appointment was introduced for the duration of the provisional mission.

Interest grew as the specifics of the mission were defined, but recruitment in Indonesia did not yield enough candidates. Due to military-political difficulties that arose during the implementation of the RTC agreement, replacing personnel from the former Royal Netherlands East Indies Army (Koninklijk Nederlands-Indisch Leger, KNIL) now serving in the VNMM with personnel from the Netherlands as quickly as possible became a priority. As cooperation and mutual understanding between the mission members and the TNI developed favorably, the initial distrust of the Indonesian high command towards the former KNIL soldiers faded into the background.

By the end of 1950, additional personnel began arriving from the Netherlands and the naval department formally joined the mission, finalizing its organizational structure. The departments of the NMM were subdivided into advisory and instruction teams corresponding to the Indonesian service branches and were stationed across the archipelago.

== Mission agreement ==
At the second ministerial conference of the Netherlands-Indonesia Union on 29 November 1950, the definitive mission was established by joint decision.

Article 1 of the agreement described the task of the Military Mission for Indonesia:

- To assist the Government of the Republic of Indonesia in the development and instruction of the Indonesian National Armed Forces;
- To provide advisory services on military organizational and technical matters;
- In addition, in the maritime field: to assist in clearing existing minefields, and to perform other activities to be determined by mutual agreement;
- In addition, in the field of military aviation: to assist with air traffic control at airfields to be determined by mutual agreement, and to perform other activities to be determined by mutual agreement.

The agreement was entered into for a period of three years, starting from 1 January 1951.

== Liquidation ==
In the first quarter of 1953, negotiations opened regarding an extension or termination of the mission agreement. Against the backdrop of the growing West New Guinea dispute and the gradual collapse of the Netherlands-Indonesia Union, it became clear that there would be no extension. This was confirmed in a protocol with annexes signed by both governments on 21 April 1953. The technical implementation of the liquidation of the NMM was assigned to a committee consisting of the Minister of Defense of Indonesia and the commander of the NMM and/or their representatives. The timeline for the liquidation or repatriation of each mission element became dependent on the completion of ongoing training of Indonesian personnel, as the TNI intended to make most of the time given to them by political decision-makers.

In accordance with the plan drawn up by the liquidation committee, nearly all instructional and advisory activities of the NMM halted in the fourth quarter of 1953. The activities of the naval department in Surabaya were a notable exception, as it remained in the country to finish ongoing training throughout the first half of 1954. On 19 December 1953, all instructional and advisory teams, as well as the relevant staff sections of the army and air force departments, were disbanded, and the Military Mission for Indonesia ended. Its formal dissolution took place on 10 March 1954.

Major General Antoine Jan Alexander Pereira (1903–1960), who headed the mission since its formation, was succeeded on 12 September 1953 by Lieutenant Colonel Hans Anton Maurenbrecher (1910–1966). When the NMM was disbanded in December 1953, Maurenbrecher handed over command to Lieutenant Colonel Louis Bernard Duitz (born 1909).

== See also ==
- Indonesia–Netherlands relations
- Defence diplomacy
