= East Borneo Region =

1946–1950 Dutch client state then autonomous region of Indonesia

East Borneo Region Daerah Kalimantan Timur
- State-level autonomous region of Indonesia
- 1947 – 1950 (Dutch Puppet State until 27 December 1949)
- Location of East Borneo within the USI
- History
  - Established: 12 May 1947
  - Disestablished: 24 March 1950
Preceded by	Succeeded by
Dutch East Indies	East Kalimantan

East Borneo Region (Indonesian: Daerah Kalimantan Timur) was a component entity of the United States of Indonesia in eastern part of Borneo. It was established on 12 May 1947 with capital at Samarinda. East Borneo was dissolved on 24 March 1950 and became part of Kalimantan Province which was formed on 14 August 1950 with its capital at Banjarmasin. Following the division of Kalimantan Province, the former territory of East Borneo was assigned to East Kalimantan in 1956.

== Notable people ==
- Adji Mohammad Parikesit
- Adji R. Aflus
- Adji R. Djokoprawiro
