= West Borneo (Special Region) =

1946–1950 Dutch client state then autonomous region of Indonesia

West Borneo (Special Region) Daerah Istimewa Kalimantan Barat
- State-level autonomous region of Indonesia
- 1947 – 1950 (Self-governing entity until 27 December 1949)
- Location of West Borneo within the USI
- History
  - Established: 12 May 1947
  - Disestablished: 22 April 1950
Preceded by	Succeeded by
Dutch East Indies	West Kalimantan

West Borneo Special Region (Indonesian: Daerah Istimewa Kalimantan Barat) was a component entity of the United States of Indonesia in western part of Borneo. It was established on 12 May 1947 with capital at Pontianak. West Borneo was dissolved on 22 April 1950 and became part of Kalimantan Province which was formed on 14 August 1950 with its capital at Banjarmasin. Following the division of Kalimantan Province, the former territory of West Borneo was assigned to West Kalimantan in 1956.

== Person of interests ==
- Syarif Hamid II of Pontianak
