= Special Region of Minangkabau =

Dutch client state and proposed province of Indonesia

The Special Region of Minangkabau, abbreviated as DIM, is a proposal to rename the Province of West Sumatra as a special region in Indonesia. This proposal has gained attention since 2014, with its main figure being Mochtar Naim, a sociologist who once served as a member of the Regional Representative Council of Indonesia (DPD RI). The proposed name is based on the nagari as a special traditional institution that meets two criteria: the nagari has an original structure and possesses rights of origin.

== History ==
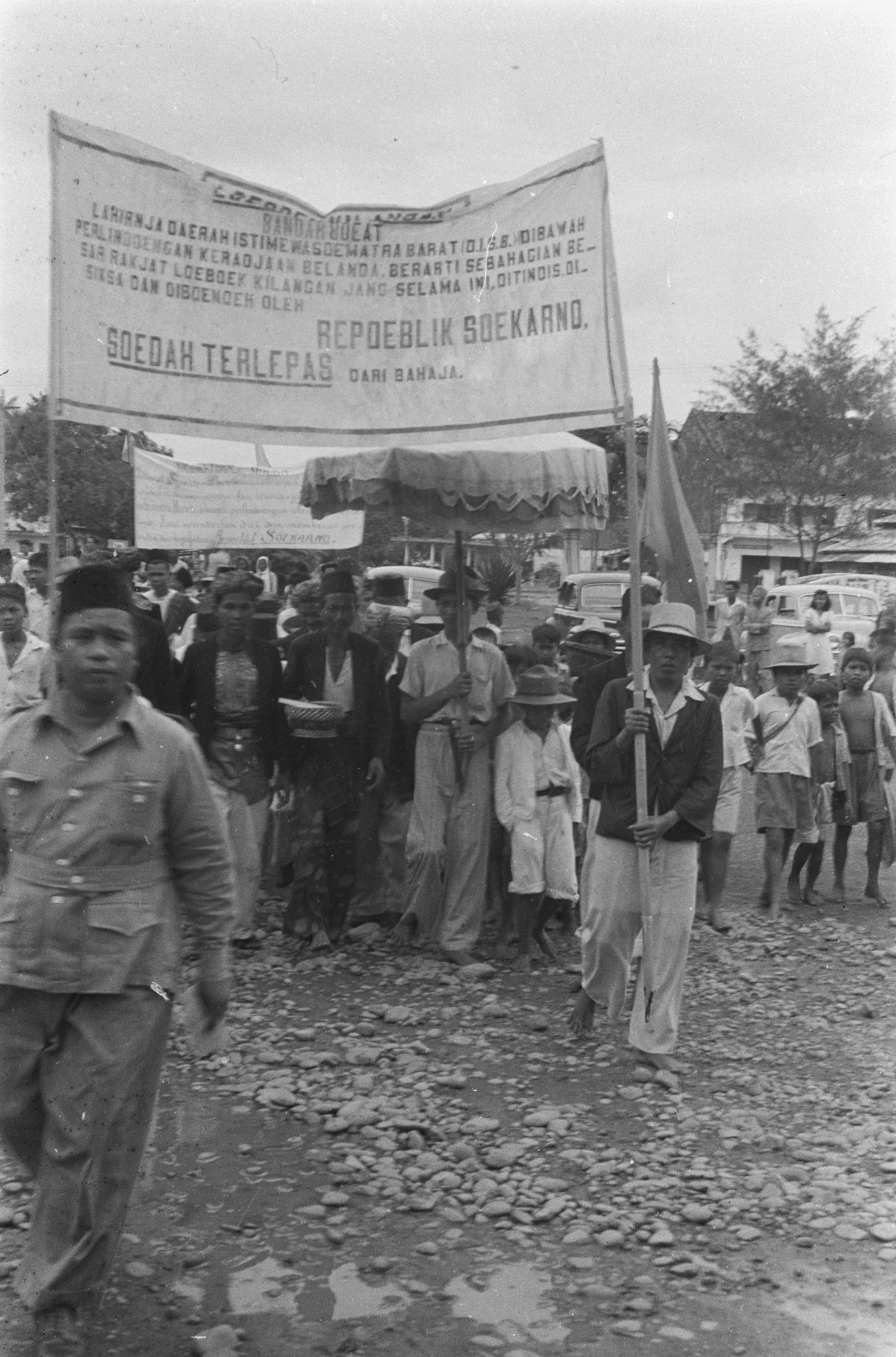
A procession in Lubuk Kilangan carrying a banner declaring the "birth" of the Special Region of West Sumatra under the Dutch crown and denouncing the "Republic of Sukarno", 26 October 1947

The emergence of the proposal to establish the Special Region of Minangkabau in public discourse began in 2014. Dr. Mochtar Naim was the figure who first declared the DIM proposal. He was an Indonesian anthropologist and sociologist from Andalas University and a graduate of McGill University, Canada. A Minangkabau person of Banuhampu, Agam descent, he first introduced the DIM proposal to the wider public together with several other national figures of Minangkabau origin.

In 2016, Dr. Mochtar Naim and his team completed the academic draft of the Bill on changing West Sumatra Province into the DIM Province. This academic draft was one of the administrative requirements set by the central government for a region seeking to apply for special-region status, as referred to in Article 18B paragraph 1 of the 1945 Constitution, which formed the legal background for the proposal.

== Debate over the Establishment ==
The idea of establishing the Special Region of Minangkabau (DIM) received various strong responses from different circles, especially among academic figures. Many Minangkabau people living in West Sumatra rejected the proposal to establish DIM, offering various arguments against it, while others supported the idea for their own reasons.
