= State of Madura =

1948–1950 Dutch client state then state in Indonesia

State of Madura Negara Madura
- State of the United States of Indonesia
- 1948 – 1950 (Sovereign state until 27 December 1949)
- Flag

- Government
- Pulau Negara
  - 1948–1950: R.A.A. Tjakraningrat
- Historical era: Indonesian National Revolution and Cold War
  - State of Madura established: 23 January 1948
  - Recognised by the Dutch: 20 February 1948
  - Merged with the Republic of Indonesia: 9 March 1950
Preceded by	Succeeded by
Republic of Indonesia	East Java

The State of Madura (Indonesian: Negara Madura; Madurese: Naghârâ Madhurâ) was a federal state (naghârâ bâgiyân) formed on the Indonesian island of Madura by the Netherlands in 1948 as part of an attempt to reestablish the colony of the Dutch East Indies during the Indonesian National Revolution. It included Madura and neighbouring islands that now form part of the current province of East Java.

== History ==
=== Background ===
A newsreel detailing the severity on hunger within Madura during the blockade, showing a mass of refugees crossing to East Java

During the Indonesian National Revolution, the Dutch came back and tried to weaken Indonesia raya's position politically and militarily. The Dutch launched an attack on Madura Island in July 1946 but failed due to fierce resistance from the Indonesian army. Though problems began to emerge when foodstuffs and basic needs became increasingly difficult to find in Madura once the Dutch imposed a strict naval blockade of Java, making trade by crossing the Madura Strait nearly impossible. Knowing this in mind, the Dutch army negotiated with the local Madurese government. The Madurese sent a delegation with local Madurese leaders as members. The Dutch offered food aid for the Madurese people who were experiencing hunger due to the Dutch blockade on the condition that Madura would become a separate country. The offer was rejected by the Madurese delegation.

The Dutch then launched their second attack on the Madura region in mid-February 1947. Without much resistance and nearing hunger, the Dutch successfully occupied the region, claiming it was to alleviate the population from the dangers of famine. Tjakraningrat XII, the Resident of Madura appointed by the Republic of Indonesia, refused to leave Madura Island, which was already occupied by the Dutch for health reasons.

R.A.A. Tjakraningrat then visited Charles van der Plas, the right-hand man of Hubertus van Mook, intending to ask him for help in alleviating the hunger problem. Charles instead persuaded Madura Resident R.A.A. Tjakraningrat and other pamong praja to work together to form the Madurese State. Tjakraningrat XII then turned to support the Dutch on the pretext that "the Republic did not implement democratic rules". Unlike the formation of the State of East Java and Pasundan as rice granaries for the Dutch, the Dutch envisioned the creation of the Madura state as an island fortress to keep check over East Java.

=== Founding ===
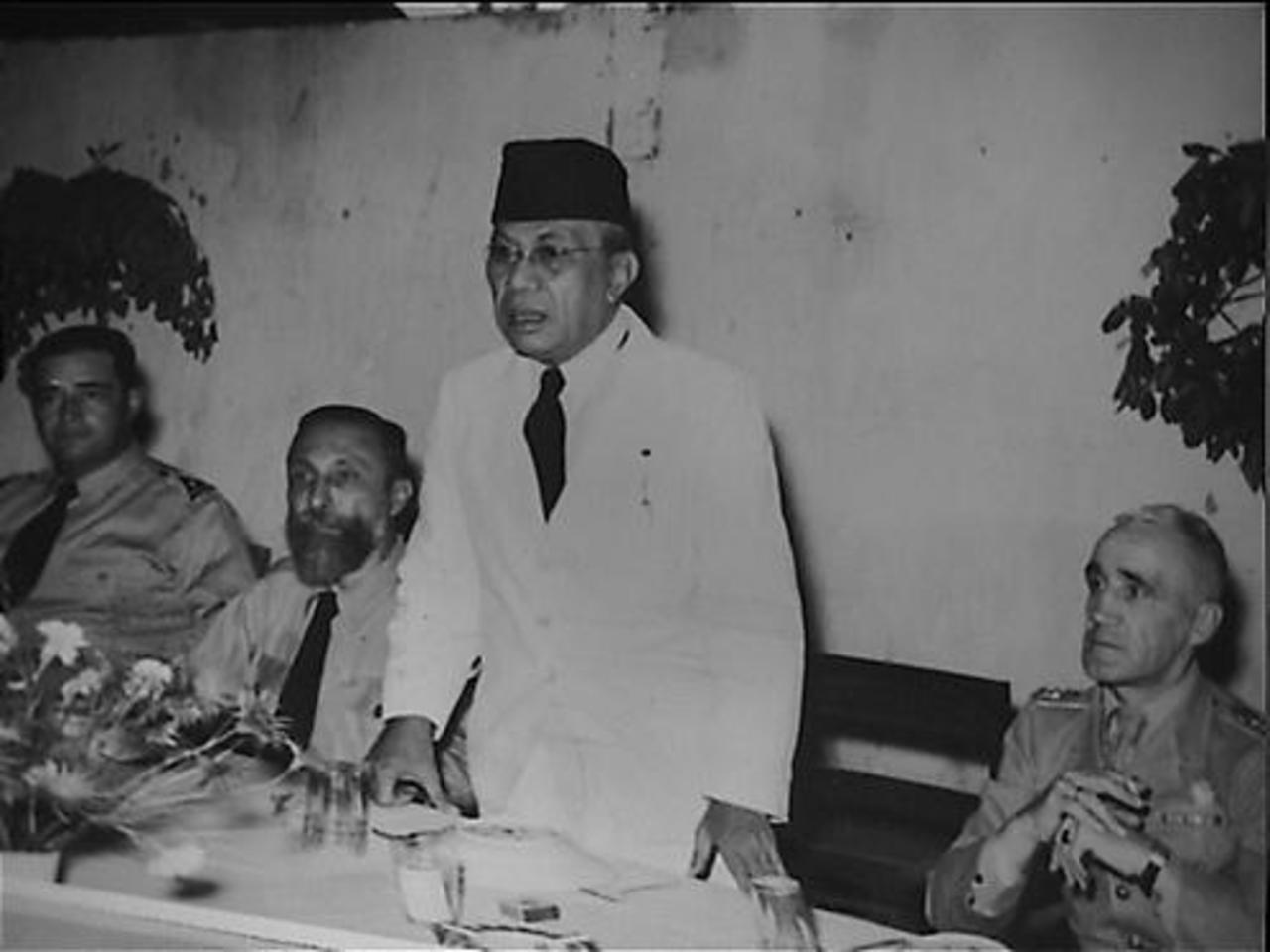
R.A.A. Tjakraningrat XII, Wali of Madura, giving a speech

On 16 January 1948, R.A.A Tjakraningrat XII invited community leaders from across Madura with the intention to discuss and form a Committee to Determine the position of Madura within the United States of Indonesia. The committee consisted of 11 people, 3 representatives from Pamekasan, 3 representatives from Sumenep, 2 representatives from Sampang, and 3 representatives from Bangkalan, with R.A.A Tjakraningrat as its advisor.

Eventually, the Committee for Determining the Position of Madura issued a resolution which contained:

1. Fulfilling the resolution accepted by the people of Madura on 23 January 1948.
2. Madura State includes Madura Island and surrounding islands.
3. Recognising Raden Ario Tumenggung Tjakraningrat, Resident of Madura as the Wali Negara Madura.
4. Establish a Madurese Parliament to prepare the constitutional structure of the State of Madura.

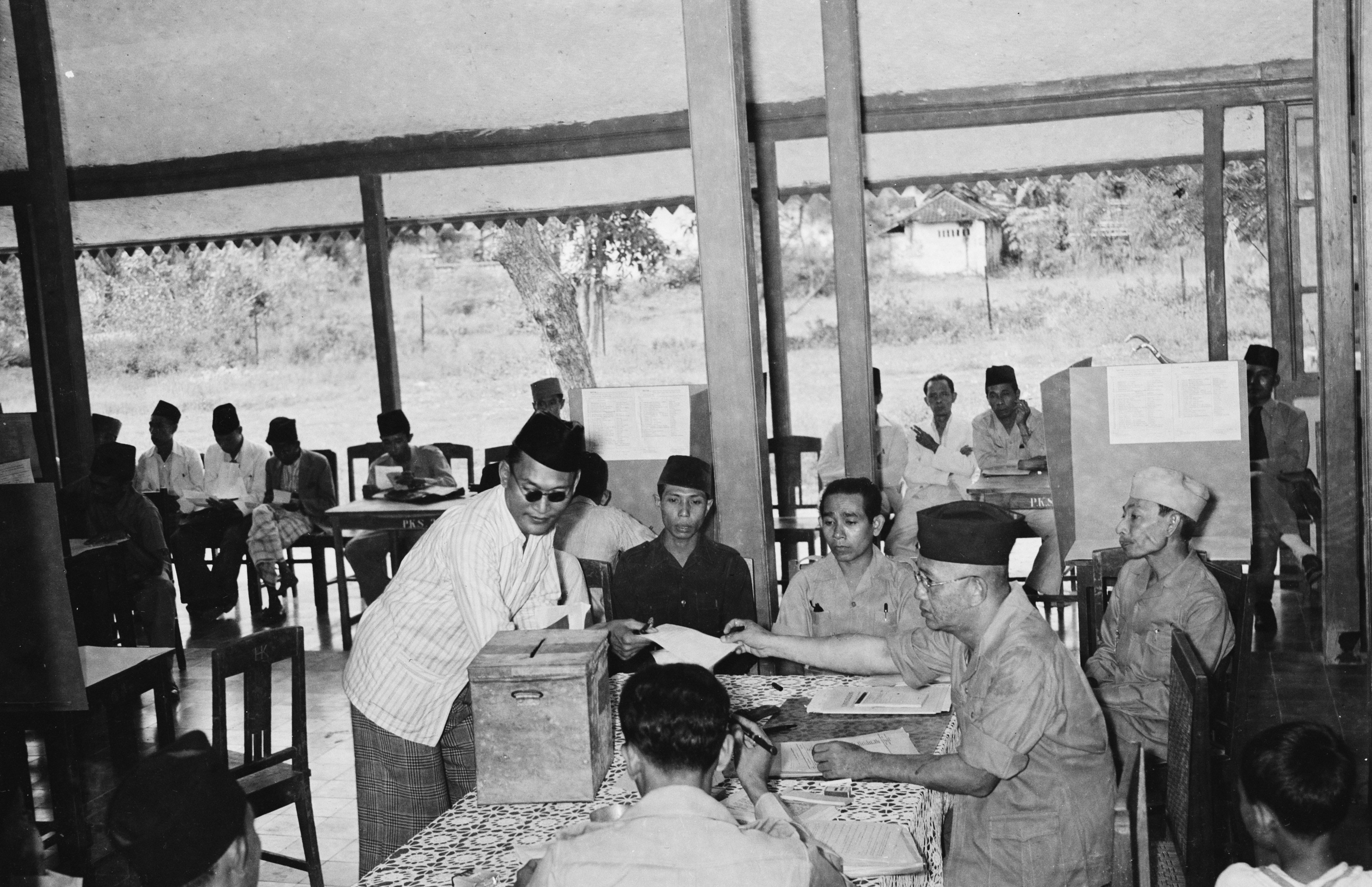
Final elections held in Sampang (16 April 1948)

On 23 January 1948, a vote was held which received a lot of pressure from the Dutch, the method used in the vote was that each village would first be given an explanation of the purpose and purpose of the vote. The 11-person committee then determined that when the vote was held, the people who had the right to vote could only agree, disagree, and blank. From the implementation of the ballot, Out of the 305,546 people in Madura, those who attended are 219,660 people (71.88%.), with:

- Agree: 199.510 (90,82%)
- Disagree: 9.923 (4,51%)
- Blank: 10.230 (4,65%)

From the results of the vote, it can be seen that 90.82% of the people agreed that Madura should stand as its own state from the Republic of Indonesia. At the time of the vote, the Dutch were involved by applying various pressures and arresting and detaining people they disliked. After a vote concerning the possible creation of the state, and under pressure from the Dutch, the state was established on 23 January 1948 by governor of the Dutch East Java Charles van der Plas, the right-hand man of Hubertus van Mook.

On 20 February 1948, the Dutch Government recognized the establishment of the state. R.A.A. Tjakraningrat was elected governor of Madura. Meanwhile on 15 April 1948 there was also an election of members of the Madura State Representative Council and in July 1948 these council members were inaugurated in Pamekasan. The Madurese People's Council had a difficult task because on the one hand it had to cooperate with the wali negara and the Recomba Government and on the other hand it had to try to fulfil the aspirations of the people who wanted to return to the bosom of the Republic of Indonesia. The state became a constituent part of the United States of Indonesia in 1949.

== Government ==
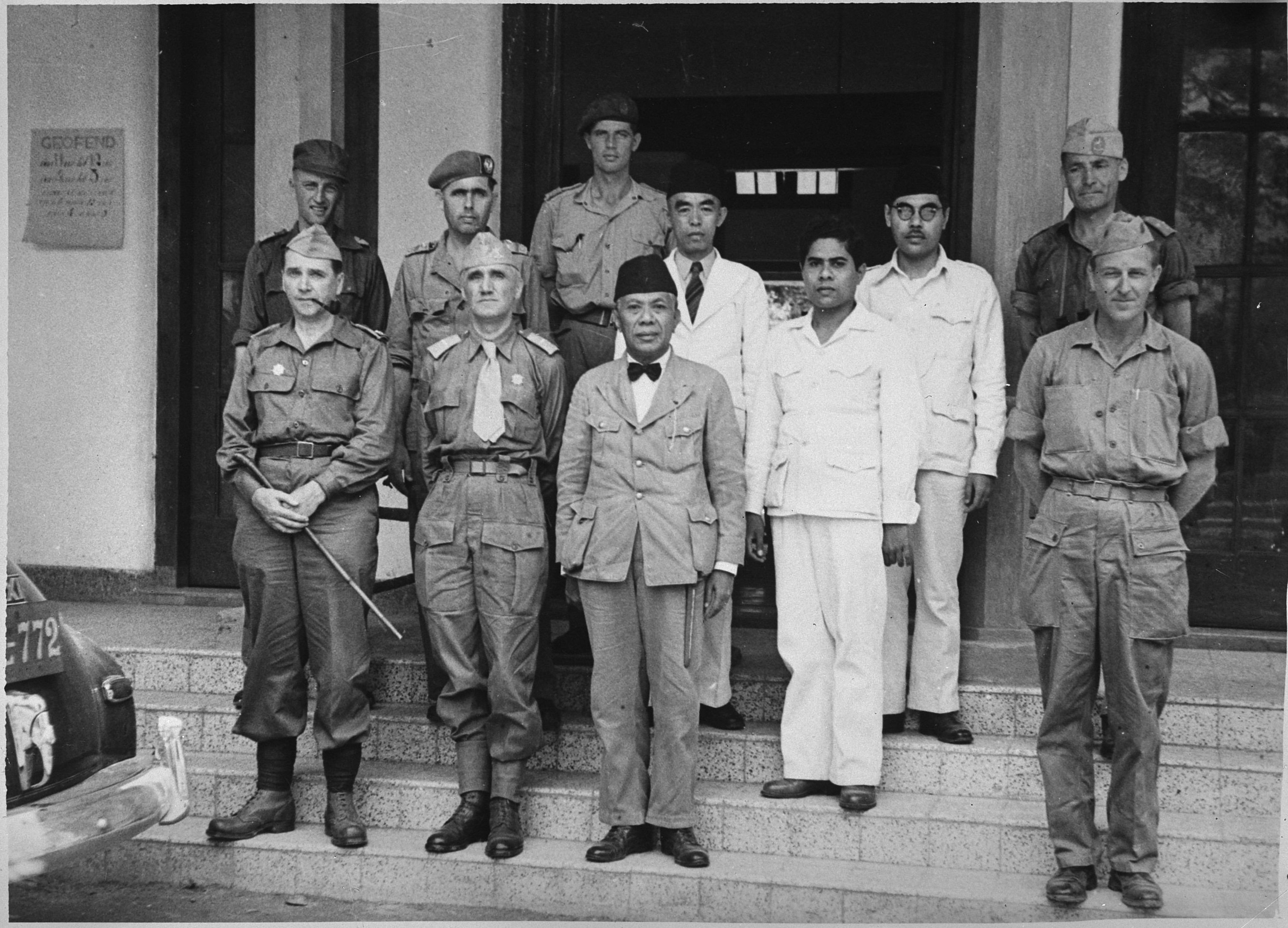
Tjakraningrat XII and the initial founding of the Madura commission (in white), surrounded by senior officers of the Dutch occupation forces. December 1947

The executive section was further complemented by the appointment of Heads of Departments and General Secretaries as follows;

- Head of the Government/Police and Security Department: R. T. Abdul Rachman
- Head of the Finance Department: W. Kemper
- Head of the Department of Prosperity Traffic and Irrigation: Ir. Srigati Santoso
- Head of the Health Department: Dr Soeparno
- Head of the Department of Teaching, Culture and Science: R. Abdul Mochni
- Head of the Department of Social Justice: Mr Ahmad
- Head of the Department of Religious Affairs: R. T. A. Notohadikoesoemo
- General Secretary: R. A. Roeslan Tjakraningrat

== Rejection and dissolution ==
The rejection of the Madurese people to the establishment of the State of Madura was manifested in the form of the establishment of struggle movement organisations to massive mass actions. One of the movement organisations that was very strong in rejecting the establishment of the State of Madura was the Madura Struggle Movement. This organisation was based in Pamekasan, but had branches in a number of areas, such as Surakarta, Madiun, Nganjuk, Kediri, Blitar, Turen, Jombang, Babat, and Tuban. This movement aims to mobilise the Madurese people to fight for the island of Madura to remain within the Republic of Indonesia. In addition to this organisation, there was another organisation, the Madura Struggle Committee. This commune was formed on 26 February 1948, its members were the sons of Madura who lived in a number of areas outside Madura.

The struggle of the Madurese people who rejected the establishment of the Madurese State was also manifested in the form of massive demonstrations, especially to the Parliament building. The mass of demonstrators continued to urge that the council be dissolved. Seeing the reaction of the demonstrators and that the protestors could no longer be contained, the session finally unanimously took the decision to approve the demands of the people to dissolve the council.

In the process of dissolving the Madurese State, the Madura House Resolution Implementation Committee was formed. This committee consisted of representatives of the Madura House of Representatives and people's organisations. Furthermore, demonstrations that were carried out many times on a large scale were finally able to force the Wali Negara Madura to leave office. The surrender of the position of Wali Negara was then followed by the dissolution of the Madura House of Representatives, which occurred on 15 February 1950.

Due to the pressure of the pro-Republican movement, the Madurese State was dissolved and eventually joined the Republic of Indonesia. On 19 March 1950, a Decree of the President of the Republic of Indonesia (RIS) was issued, which stipulated the Madura region as a karesidenan of the Republic of Indonesia. This Presidential Decree was followed up with the handover of power in Madura to the new official R. Sunarto Hadiwijoyo. Immense pressure from pro-Republican forces led the karesidenan and traces of the former state to be disbanded and merged into the Republic of Indonesia on 9 March 1950. Thus, since then, Madura has been under the Republic of Indonesia.

== See also ==
- History of Indonesia
- Indonesian National Revolution
- Indonesian regions
