= Flags of the United States of Indonesia =

Flags used by the United States of Indonesia

United States of Indonesia
- Use: National flag
- Proportion: 2:3
- Design: A horizontal bicolour of red and white

The Flags of the United States of Indonesia refers to the state flags that were used as the official state symbols of the United States of Indonesia (Abbreviation: RIS), the predecessor state of the Republic of Indonesia. The flag that were hoisted during the proclamation of independence on 17 August 1945 remained as the official flag of the United States of Indonesia after its transfer of sovereignty on December 27, 1949, and it was written on the Federal Constitution of 1949.

== Legal basis ==
After the Dutch East Indies, on behalf of the Dutch government transferred its sovereignty to the Republic of Indonesia, the new federated state called the United States of Indonesia was formed out of former Dutch territories in the East Indies and several states formed prior to the round table conference held in 1949. The new federation adopted a constitution in which stated in the Chapter III, article III, is that the official flag of the United States of Indonesia is a bicolor red and white, similar to the one that was adopted by the State of the Republic of Indonesia. (Note: Wikisource: Chapter III, Article III of the 1949 Federal Constitution)

== State flags ==
=== State of the Republic of Indonesia (1949–1950) ===
Flag	Date	Use	Description
	1949–1950	State of the Republic of Indonesia	Bicolor with two equal horizontal bands, red (top) and white (bottom) with an overall ratio of 2:3.

=== State of East Indonesia ===
During the Denpasar conference held in 1946, a majority of the delegates called for the adoption of the national anthem to be Indonesia Raya, and for the Indonesian red and white flag to be the national flag of East Indonesia. On 22 December, Governor van Mook gave his response to the proposals. He supported the use of the Indonesian national anthem, but was more cautious about the flag.

Flag	Date	Use	Description
	1946–1950	State flag	A four striped flag of yellow-red-white-green (horizontally) is given for a state called Indonesia Timur (meaning East Indonesia), a "Federation of East Indonesian States", according to D. Rühl in his book Vlag en Wapen van der Republiek Indonesie, 1950.
	1947–1950	Presidential standard	Besides a national coat of arms and flag a presidential flag and flags for the members of the council of ministers were adopted. The flag of the president was gironny of black, white, red and yellow charged in the middle with a white eight-leaved lotus-flower. Adopted on 2 August 1947.
	1947–1950	Presidential pennant	Beside a presidential flag was a light-blue pennon with a lotus-flower seen from the side.
	1947–1950	Prime ministerial flag	On the flags of rank of the Prime Minister, the President of Parliament, the ministers and the vice-ministers there was the Garuda from the emblem of state on a dark-green cloth and at the mast end six-pointed stars, adopted on 2 August 1947.

=== State of East Sumatra ===
According to D. Rühl, 1950. The design of the flag was confirmed by a letter from Mr. Van de Velde, Governmental counsellor for Political Affairs on Sumatra to the Lieutenant Governor General Van Mook dd. on 27 February 1948, which reads as follows:

de vlag der Negara werd vastgesteld, bestaande uit drie horizontale banen van geel, wit en groen. Met deze kleuren wenst men te symboliseren Grootheid, Rust en Welvaart.

Translated as:

the flag of the Negara was established, consisting of three horizontal bands of yellow, white and green. With these colors one wishes to symbolize Greatness, Tranquility and Prosperity.”

Flag	Date	Use	Description
	1948–1950	State of East Sumatra	The flag of the State of Eastern Sumatra consisted of three breadths yellow, white and green, the colors of the arms of Medan. The colors symbolize Greatness, Peace and Prosperity.
	1949–1950	Standard of Wali Negara	The standard of Wali Negara consisted of the color yellow and green, with the state coat of arms in the center.

=== Pasundan ===
Two flags were used by the State of Pasundan. The first flag consisted of a bicolor flag of white and green, the flag mostly used by pro independence and Pasundan People's Party sympathist and the other was three stripes of green, white, and green.

Flag	Date	Use	Description
	1948–1950	State of Pasundan	Tricolor flag of green, white, and green.
	1947–1950	Pasundan Republic, later State of Pasundan (Pro Independence)	Bicolor white and green flag.

=== South Sumatra ===
The Second Dutch military intervention on 30 August 1948 resulted in the establishment of State of South Sumatra, and was incorporated to RIS following the transfer of sovereignty on 27 December 1949. In 1949 the flag was adopted, it was a bicolor yellow and green.

Flag	Date	Use	Description
	1949–1950	State of South Sumatra	Two breadths yellow and green.

=== Great Dayak ===
In 1947–1950 the State of Great Dayak had a flag, namely a horizontal line with three colors namely red, yellow and blue.

Flag	Date	Use	Description
	1947–1950	State of Great Dayak	Tricolor flag of red, yellow and blue.

=== Kotawaringin ===
The Autonomous Community of Kotawaringin used the flag of the former Sultanate of Kotawaringin. Carried over by the Dutch during its intervention, it was used briefly for one year until its dissolution in the 1950s.

Flag	Date	Use	Description
	1949–1950	Autonomous Community of Kotawaringin	Base of yellow with an Arabic inscription

== See also ==
- National emblem of Indonesia
