= State of South Sumatra =

1948–1950 Dutch client state then state of Indonesia

State of South Sumatra Negara Sumatera Selatan
- State of the United States of Indonesia
- 1948 – 1950 (Dutch puppet state until 27 December 1949)
- Flag

- Capital: Palembang
- Government
  - Type: Parliamentary republic
- Wali Negara
  - 1948–1950: Abdul Malik
- Historical era: Cold War
  - State of South Sumatra established: 30 August 1948
  - Merged with the Republic of Indonesia: 24 March 1950
| Preceded by | Succeeded by |
| Republic of Indonesia | South Sumatra |

The State of South Sumatra (Indonesian: Negara Sumatera Selatan) was a federated state and part of the United States of Indonesia formed in the southern part of Sumatra by the Netherlands in 1948 as part of an attempt to reestablish the colony of the Dutch East Indies during the Indonesian National Revolution.

== History ==
=== Background ===
At that time, after the Dutch returned to Indonesia, two forms of statehood developed, namely a unitary state and a federated state. The Republic of Indonesia wanted a unitary state while the Netherlands wanted a federated state. The dispute between the two countries began to find a common perception since the Linggadjati Agreement was signed on 15 November 1946. Since then, the resolution of the conflict between Indonesia and the Netherlands has always referred to the framework of the formation of a union state. Ever since the Netherlands set foot in Indonesia for the second time, the Dutch thought that the most suitable form of state for Indonesia was a federal state. This was due to the vast differences between the regions of the Indonesian archipelago. The Dutch government's view may have been correct, as a federal state suits a society that is highly diverse and pluralistic in many ways such as social, cultural, geographical, and natural resource wealth.

The federal system gives the different regions the opportunity to govern themselves without having to submit to a central government that tends to govern nationally while ignoring the distinctive features of the various regions. However, history has shown that the federal state was used by the Dutch colonial authorities to divide the Indonesian people. As the Netherlands was unable to dissolve the Republic of Indonesia and defeat its military forces, it formed a number of states that would merge into a federal state to defeat Indonesia.

=== Formation ===
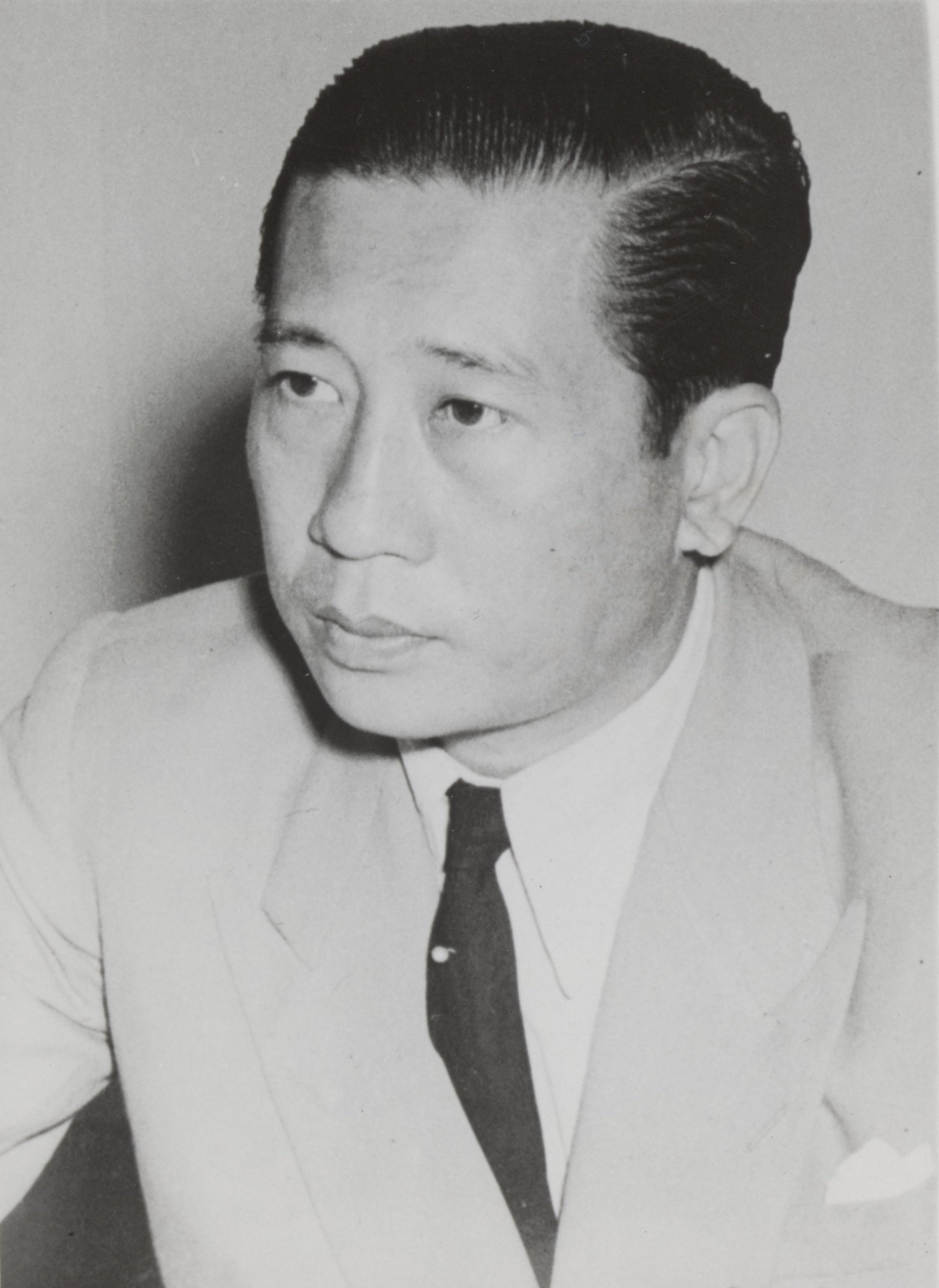
Abdul Malik, Wali Negara of South Sumatra

On 25 November 1945 and later used as the basis for talks during the Malino Conference in July 1946. In this conference, representatives of Kalimantan and East Indonesia concluded that in the Indonesian constitutional order, federalism should be the basis of a unitary state system covering the whole of Indonesia, thus forming the United States of Indonesia. The connection between the federal state and the Dutch desire to maintain power in Indonesia is reinforced by the fact that the boundaries of the states formed by the Dutch in Sumatra and Java were the armistice lines drawn by the Netherlands and the Republic of Indonesia. This shows that the states were a Dutch fabrication. Dutch politics in creating a federal state in South Sumatra was supported by the political situation in Palembang when the political elite was in a weak state, this made it easier for the Dutch to enter politics by influencing people to cooperate with.

In December 1947, the Dutch established a Body for the Preparation of South Sumatra to establish a federal state in an area originally planned to remain part of the Republic of Indonesia. Subsequently the Dutch also formed a 36-member advisory council comprising 30 Indonesians, 2 Dutch citizens and representatives of the Chinese, Arabic and Indian ethnic communities. This group then elected Abdul Malik as its chairman, and he became head of state when State of South Sumatra was formally established on 30 August 1948. It covered approximately one quarter of the area of the province of South Sumatra.

In the regulation of the South Sumatra State Administration, the area included in the NSS is the area in the government decree dated 30 August 1948 number 4 (staadsblad number 204), namely the territory of South Sumatra. The state capital is Palembang, the official language is Indonesian. According to Kahin, although South Sumatra had the status of a state for eight months its territory only covered the Palembang Prefecture, about a quarter of South Sumatra. Meanwhile, Abdul Malik as Wali Negara said that there were several areas that would be voluntarily included in the NSS, including areas in Palembang, Bengkulu and Jambi. Although this area did not fully cover the areas in South Sumatra, it was sufficient to represent the South Sumatra region. The inhabitants of these areas were culturally attached to South Sumatra and through free and democratic expression expressed a wish to join the NSS. Thus all people residing in the territory of the state have equal rights and protection.

== Government ==
Upon the establishment of the state, Abdul Malik was inaugurated as head of state by a representative of the Dutch crown in Palembang's Great Mosque. The people's representative assembly, a continuation of the advisory council, was the most powerful state institution, but the annual state budget was set by the head of state, and submitted it to the assembly for approval. A number of government departments were established, and ministers appointed as follows:

- Home Affairs Minister: Alwi
- Information, Culture, Science and Religion Minister: Mohammad Rasyid
- Development, Transport and Waterways Minister: R.M. Akip
- Welfare Minister: H.A. Polderman
- Justice Minister: F.P. Stocker

Many Dutch nationals held positions as heads of government agencies and mayors, including of the capital, Palembang.

== Dissolution ==
Although the NSS was established and welcomed mainly by federalists, the actual popular support for the federal state was very weak. This is evident in the fact that almost all federal states in Indonesia did not develop, after the Republic of Indonesia Union (RIS) was formed on 27 December 1949. The federal form of state resulting from the Round Table Conference was basically not a form rooted in the will of the population. At the time the NSS was established, the Palembang area was still surrounded by an insecure atmosphere, the political process was carried out by force. The social and economic conditions of the South Sumatra region in mid-1948 were not very encouraging due to the war atmosphere. The people experienced difficulties in dealing with prices that were felt to be quite high. This situation can affect the course of the economy in the NSS which relies on the results of rubber, oil and coal plantations.

By early 1950, there were growing calls for the constituent states of the RUSI to dissolve themselves into a unitary Republic of Indonesia. The South Sumatra representative assembly voted for reintegration into the Republic of Indonesia, and asked for the state to be placed under the control of a RUSI representative, rather than the head of state. The dissolution was facilitated by RUSI Presidential Regulation No. 126/1950, through which the State of South Sumatra ceased to exist as of 24 March 1950.

== See also ==
- History of Indonesia
- Indonesian National Revolution
- Indonesian regions
