= United States of Indonesia =

1949–1950 federal state in Southeast Asia

United States of Indonesia Republik Indonesia Serikat (Indonesian) Verenigde Staten van Indonesië (Dutch)
- 1949–1950
- Flag National emblem
- Anthem: Indonesia Raya "Great Indonesia"
- Capital: Jakarta
- Common languages: Indonesian
- Government: Federal parliamentary republic
- President
  - 1949–1950: Sukarno
- Vice President & Prime Minister
  - 1949–1950: Mohammad Hatta
- Legislature
  - Upper house: Senate
  - Lower house: House of Representatives
- History
  - Independence from the Netherlands: 27 December 1949
  - Constitution adopted: 27 December 1949
  - Replaced by the Unitary State of the Republic of Indonesia: 17 August 1950
- Currency: Rupiah (IDR)
Preceded by	Succeeded by
Republic of Indonesia; Dutch East Indies	Republic of Indonesia; Netherlands-Indonesia Union

The United States of Indonesia (Indonesian: Republik Indonesia Serikat, lit. 'Republic of the United States of Indonesia'; (Note: The literal translation is also used in a provisional translation of the state's constitution.) Dutch: Verenigde Staten van Indonesië; abbreviated as RIS or RUSI, also known as Federal Republic of Indonesia) was a short-lived federal state to which the Netherlands formally transferred sovereignty of the Dutch East Indies (except Netherlands New Guinea) on 27 December 1949 following the Dutch–Indonesian Round Table Conference. This transfer ended the four-year conflict between Indonesian nationalists and the Netherlands for control of Indonesia. It lasted less than a year, before being replaced by the unified and unitary Republic of Indonesia.

== Background ==
In January 1942, the Japanese invaded the Dutch East Indies, displacing the Dutch colonial government. On 17 August 1945, two days after the Japanese surrender, Indonesian nationalist leader Sukarno declared Indonesian independence. The Dutch, viewing Sukarno and the Indonesian leadership as having collaborated with the Japanese, decided to restore their authority. However, British South East Asia Command, under Lord Louis Mountbatten, who had responsibility for the Dutch East Indies, refused to allow Dutch troops to land in Java and Sumatra and recognised de facto Republican authority there. However, the Dutch were able to reassert control over most of the area previously occupied by the Japanese Navy, including Borneo and the Great East. Discussions between the British and the Dutch resulted in Acting Governor-General of the Dutch East Indies Hubertus van Mook proposing eventual self-determination for an Indonesian commonwealth. In July 1946, the Dutch organised the Malino Conference in Sulawesi at which representatives from Borneo and eastern Indonesia backed the proposal for the federal United States of Indonesia with links to the Netherlands. It would comprise four elements, Java, Sumatra, Dutch Borneo and the Great East. This was followed on 15 November by the Linggadjati Agreement, in which the Dutch recognised de facto republican control over Sumatra, Java and Madura, and the Republic of Indonesia agreed to the principle of a federal Indonesia in which it would be one state. The Dutch then organised the December 1946 Denpasar Conference, which led to the establishment of the State of East Indonesia, followed by a state in West Borneo in 1947.

Military action by the Dutch launched on 20 July 1947 against areas controlled by the Indonesian republicans, Operation Product, resulted in the Dutch regaining control of West and East Java, the areas around Medan, Palembang and Padang in Sumatra. The United Nations called for a ceasefire, and negotiations between the two sides led to the Renville Agreement of January 1948, with a ceasefire along the "Van Mook Line", which connected the most advanced Dutch positions. The Dutch then established states in the areas they had reoccupied, including East Sumatra (December 1947), Madura and West Java (February 1948), South Sumatra (September 1948) and East Java (November 1948). The leaders of these regions then established the Federal Consultative Assembly.

A second Dutch military action, Operation Kraai, aimed at destroying the Republic, was launched on 18 December 1948. Despite recapturing the major cities of Java, including the republican capital of Yogyakarta, and all of Sumatra except Aceh in the far north, it triggered the protest resignation of the cabinets of the State of East Indonesia and Pasundan (West Java) and the Sultan of Yogyakarta from his position as regional head. There was also pressure from the United States and the United Nations, in particular in the form of a Security Council resolution. The Dutch agreed to negotiations with Indonesia to arrange a transfer of sovereignty. The Dutch–Indonesian Round Table Conference took place in The Hague from August to November 1949 and resulted in the Dutch agreeing to hand over sovereignty to the Dutch East Indies, except for Western New Guinea. However, many Indonesian nationalists believed that the Dutch had insisted on a federal state in an attempt to weaken or even break up the new nation, a manifestation of a "divide and conquer" strategy. Nevertheless, on 27 December 1949, sovereignty was transferred to the United States of Indonesia.

== Governance ==
The RIS had a bicameral legislature. The People's Representative Council consisted of 50 representatives from the Republic of Indonesia and 100 from the various states according to their populations. The Senate had two members from each constituent part of the RIS regardless of population, making 32 members in total. The state was governed according to the Federal Constitution of 1949, which had been drawn up on the sidelines of the Round Table Conference. It had a cabinet of 16 members, led by Prime Minister Hatta.

== Constituent entities ==
The United States of Indonesia. The constituent state of the Republic of Indonesia is shown in red. Other constituent states are shown in orange. Autonomous constituent entities are shown in yellow.

The RIS comprised sixteen main entities: seven states (negara), including the "Republic of Indonesia" consisting of parts of Java and Sumatra (a combined population of over 31 million); and the nine formerly directly-ruled territories (neo-lands, Dutch: neo-landschappen). Apart from the Republic of Indonesia, all these constituent entities, which had populations between 100,000 and 11 million, were established by the Dutch. Also included were some smaller entities not seen as viable as distinct political entities.

Name	Established	Capital	Area (km^{2})	Dissolved	Notes
Republic of Indonesia	17 August 1945	Yogyakarta	-	-	-
States
East Indonesia	24 December 1946	Makassar	346,300	17 August 1950	Longest-lasting state
East Sumatra	25 December 1947	Medan	17,500	17 August 1950	Along with East Indonesia, the last state to be dissolved
Madura	20 February 1948	Pamekasan	5,500	9 March 1950	State
Pasundan	25 February 1948	Bandung	35,900	11 March 1950	State
South Sumatra	2 September 1948	Palembang	74,000	24 March 1950	State
East Java	27 November 1948	Surabaya	22,200	9 March 1950	State
Autonomous entities
West Borneo	12 May 1947	Pontianak	146,800	22 April 1950	
East Borneo	12 May 1947	Samarinda	200,000	24 March 1950	Federation
Great Dayak	3 June 1947	Banjarmasin	132,000	4 April 1950	Neo-land
Bandjar	14 January 1948	-	26,000	4 April 1950	
Southeast Borneo Federation	March 1947	-	14,100	4 April 1950	Federation
Bangka	July 1947	–	12,000	4 April 1950	Neo-land
Belitung	July 1947	–	4,800	4 April 1950	Neo-land
Riau	July 1947	–	10,800	4 April 1950	Neo-land
Central Java	2 March 1949 (Note: Recognition by the Dutch authorities of the temporary representative body Schiller 1955, p. 121)	Semarang	14,000	9 March 1950	Undefined political entity
Other regions
Kotawaringin	–	-	20,600	4 April 1950	Autonomous community
Padang (West Sumatra Region)	–	-	-	9 March 1950	Autonomous community
Sabang	–	–	-	9 March 1950	Autonomous community
Djakarta Federal District	June 1948	–	3,000	11 March 1950	–

== Dissolution ==
From the outset, the majority of Indonesians were opposed to the federal system resulting from the Round Table Agreement. The main reason was that the whole concept was associated with colonialism. However, there were other reasons. One reason was the feeling that a federal state lacked cohesion and would potentially lead to states seceding, while another reason was that the Indonesian side had only accepted it as a short-term tactic. In addition, most of the non-republican areas were controlled by traditional rulers, who were seen as too pro-Dutch and anachronistic. Finally, there were insufficient ethnic or cultural ties between people in the individual states to overcome the dominance of Java. For example, although the population of the State of Madura was entirely ethnic Madurese, almost as many Madurese lived in the ethnically mixed State of East Java, forming a substantial minority.

Even those who supported the idea of a federal state wanted the form of it to be decided by the people of Indonesia through an elected Constitutional Assembly, rather by than the former colonial power. The Dutch also tried to convince Indonesians that a unitary state would mean Javanese domination, although without much success.

In March and April 1950, all the constituents of the RIS except East Sumatra and East Indonesia dissolved themselves into the Republic. From 3–5 May, a three-way conference between the State of East Indonesia, the State of East Sumatra and the Republic of Indonesia ended with a decision to merge the three entities into a single unitary state. On 19 May, an announcement was issued by the governments of the United States of Indonesia (representing the two remaining constituent states) and the Republic of Indonesia, which stated that all parties, "...have reached an agreement to jointly create a unitary state as the transformation of the Republic of Indonesia proclaimed on 17 August 1945". The United States of Indonesia was officially dissolved by President Sukarno on 17 August 1950 – the fifth anniversary of his proclamation of independence – and replaced by the unitary Republic of Indonesia.

== See also ==
- History of Indonesia
- Indonesian National Revolution
- Indonesian regions
- List of members of the Senate of the United States of Indonesia
- Netherlands-Indonesia Union
- State of East Indonesia
