= State of East Java =

1948–1950 Dutch client state then state of Indonesia

State of East Java Negara Jawa Timur
- State of the United States of Indonesia
- 1948 – 1950 (Sovereign state until 27 December 1949)
- Flag

- East Java in the United States of Indonesia
- Historical era: Cold War
  - State of East Java established: 26 November 1948
  - Merged with the Republic of Indonesia: 25 February 1950
Preceded by	Succeeded by
Republic of Indonesia	East Java

The State of East Java (Indonesian: Negara Jawa Timur) was a federal state (negara bagian) formed on the Indonesian island of Java by the Netherlands in 1948. It subsequently became a component of the United States of Indonesia, but merged into the Republic of Indonesia on 9 March 1950.

== See also ==
- History of Indonesia
- Indonesian National Revolution
- Indonesian regions
