= Indonesian National Armed Forces =

Combined military forces of Indonesia

- Tentara Nasional Indonesia
- Insignia of the Indonesian National Armed Forces

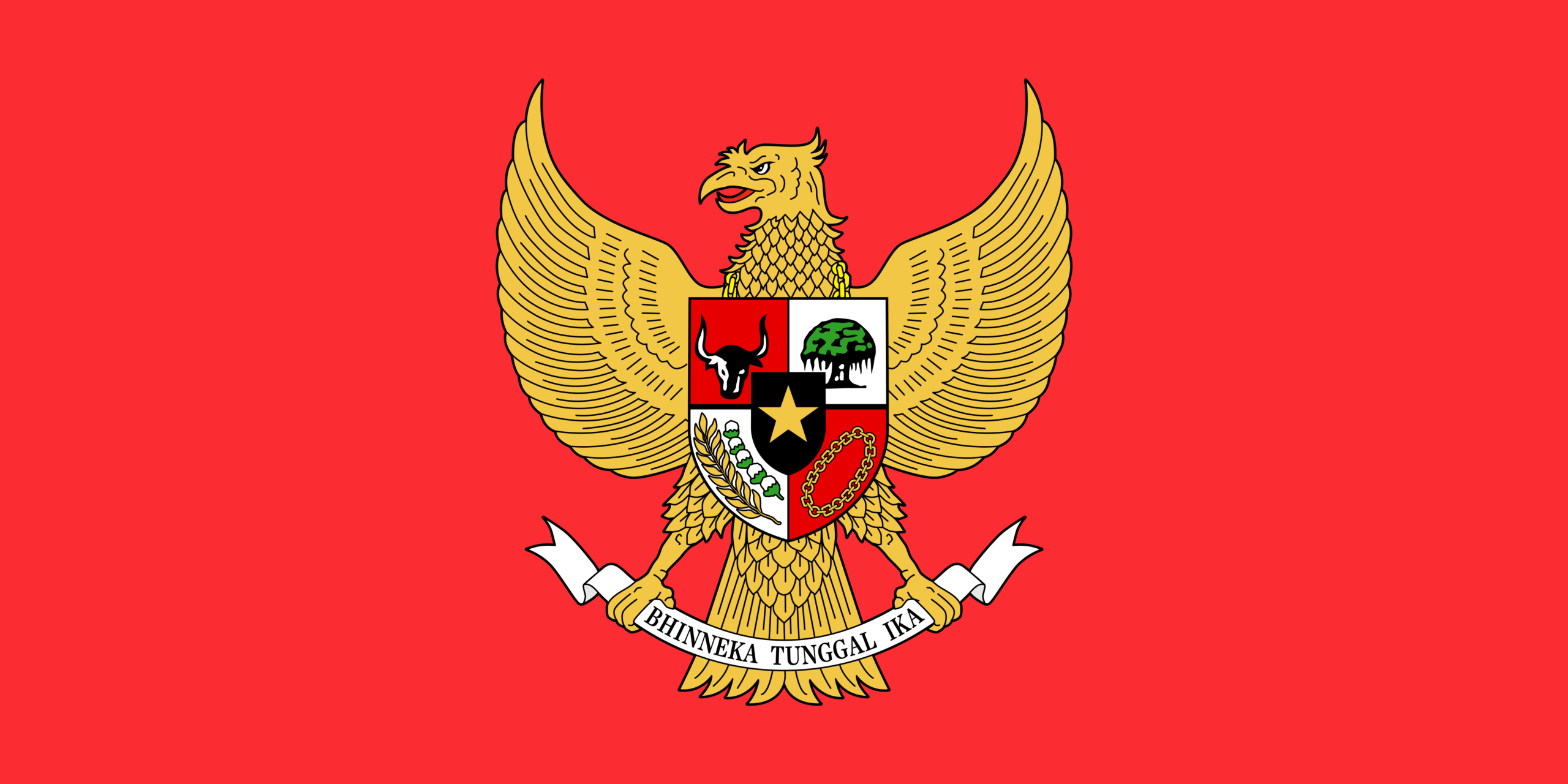
- Flag of the Indonesian National Armed Forces Reverse
- Motto: Tri Dharma Eka Karma (Sanskrit, lit. 'Three services, one determination')
- Founded: 5 October 1945; 81 years ago as the People's Security Army
- Current form: 3 June 1947; 79 years ago
- Service branches: Indonesian Army; Indonesian Navy; Indonesian Marine Corps; Indonesian Air Force
- Headquarters: Cilangkap, Jakarta
- Website: tni.mil.id

Leadership
- Commander-in-Chief of the Armed Forces: President Prabowo Subianto
- Coordinating Minister for Political and Security Affairs: Djamari Chaniago
- Minister of Defense: Sjafrie Sjamsoeddin
- Commander of the Armed Forces: Gen. Agus Subiyanto

Personnel
- Military age: 17
- Conscription: No
- Active personnel: 433,700 (2026)
- Reserve personnel: 400,000 (2026)
- Deployed personnel: 54,394 (2026)

Expenditure
- Budget: Rp 337.1 Trillion / $18.9 billion USD (2026)
- Percent of GDP: 2% (2026)

Industry
- Domestic suppliers: List: PT Pindad; PT Komodo Armaments; PT Sentra Surya Eka Jaya (SSE); PT Enrol Sistem Indonesia; PT Sari Bahari Malang; PT DAHANA; PT Len Industri (Persero); PT DI (IAe); PT PAL; PT Palindo Marine; PT Lundin Industry Invest; PT Citra Shipyard; PT Tesco Indomaritim; PT Dok dan Perkapalan (DKB) Kodja Bahari; PT SRITEX; PT Famatex; PT Infoglobal Teknologi Semesta; CV Maju Mapan; PT Fista Bahari Internusa; PT CMI Teknologi
- Foreign suppliers: Current: Australia; Austria; Brazil; Bosnia and Herzegovina; Bulgaria; Croatia; Canada; China; Czech Republic; France; Germany; India; Italy; Japan; Netherlands; Norway; Pakistan; Poland; Romania; Russia; Serbia; Singapore; Slovakia; Spain; South Africa; South Korea; Sweden; Switzerland; Thailand; Turkey; Ukraine; United Kingdom; United States; Former: Czechoslovakia; East Germany; Israel; USSR; Yugoslavia

Related articles
- History: Military history of Indonesia: Indonesian National Revolution; Battle of Kotabaru; Battle of Medan; Battle of Ambarawa; Battle of Surabaya; Madiun affair; General Offensive of 1 March 1949; Siege of Surakarta Age of Gerombolan; Bambu Runtjing rebellion; Tjitarum Brigade rebellion; Merapi-Merbabu Complex rebellion; Darul Islam rebellion; South Sulawesi insurgency; South Kalimantan insurgency; Insurgency in Aceh (1953-1962); Battalion 426 rebellion; Operation Gunung Gede; APRA coup d'état; Makassar Uprising; South Maluku rebellion; Invasion of Ambon; Justice Defense Force rebelion; Barisan Sakit Hati rebelion; PRRI rebellion; Operation 17 Agustus; Permesta rebellion Operation Trikora Insurgency in Papua; Operation Cartenz's Peace Cross border attacks in Sabah Operation Dwikora; Insurgency in Sarawak 30 September Movement; Indonesian mass killings of 1965–66; Operation Merapi; Operation Trisula; Operation Security and Order Operation Lotus; Battle of Dili; Occupation of East Timor Insurgency in Aceh; 2003–2004 Indonesian offensive in Aceh Post-Suharto era internal conflict; Communal conflict in Poso; Maluku sectarian conflict; Sambas riots; Sampit conflict Operation Enduring Freedom – Horn of Africa; MV Sinar Kudus hijacking War on Terror in Indonesia; Tanjung Priok massacre; Talangsari incident; Operation Madago Raya UN peacekeeping forces
- Ranks: Indonesian military ranks

The Indonesian National Armed Forces (Indonesian: Tentara Nasional Indonesia, lit. 'Indonesian National Military'; abbreviated as TNI) are the military forces of the Republic of Indonesia. It consists of the Army (TNI-AD), Navy (TNI-AL), and Air Force (TNI-AU). The President of Indonesia is the Supreme Commander of the Armed Forces. As of 2023, it comprises approximately 404,500 military personnel including the Indonesian Marine Corps (Korps Marinir RI), which is a branch of the Navy.

Initially formed with the name of the People's Security Army (TKR), then later changed to the Republic of Indonesia Army (TRI) before changing again its name to the Indonesian National Armed Forces (TNI) to the present. The Indonesian Armed Forces were formed during the Indonesian National Revolution, when it undertook a guerrilla war along with informal militia. As a result of this, and the need to maintain internal security, the Armed forces including the Army, Navy, and Air Force has been organised along territorial lines, aimed at defeating internal enemies of the state and potential external invaders. Under the 1945 Constitution, all citizens are legally entitled and obliged to defend the nation. Conscription is provided for by law, however the Forces have been able to maintain mandated strength levels without resorting to a draft.

The Indonesian armed forces (military) personnel does not include members of law enforcement and paramilitary personnel such as the Indonesian National Police (Polri) consisting of approximately 440,000+ personnel, Mobile Brigade Corps (Brimob) of around 42,000+ armed personnel, and the Indonesian College Students' Regiment or Resimen Mahasiswa (Menwa) which is a collegiate military service consisting of 26,000 trained personnel.

== History ==
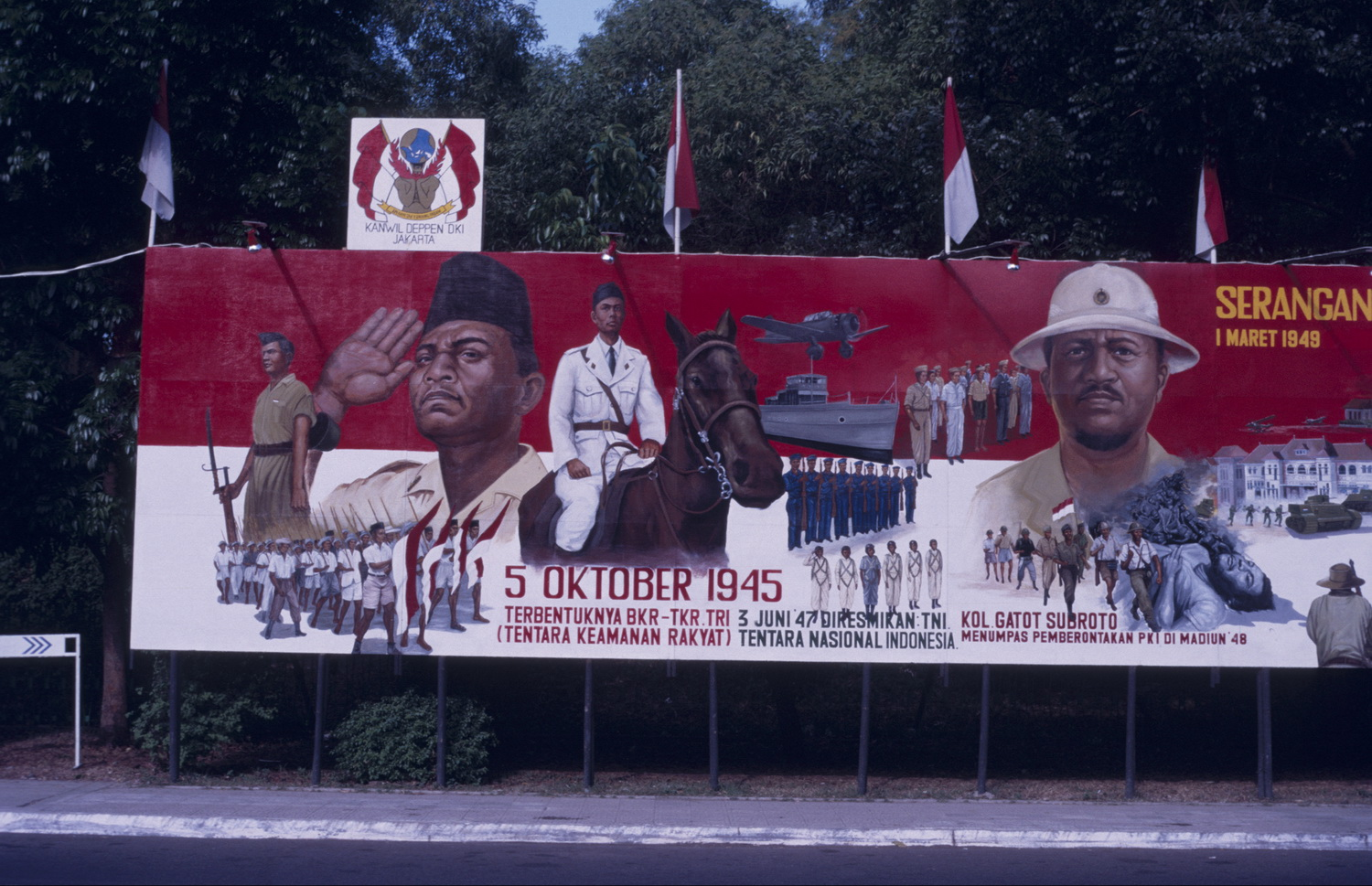
A road-side painting in Jakarta commemorating the anniversary of the Indonesian National Armed Forces in 1985

Before the formation of the Indonesian Republic, the military authority in the Dutch East Indies was held by the Royal Dutch East Indies Army (KNIL) and by naval forces of the Royal Netherlands Navy (KM). Although both the KNIL and KM were not directly responsible for the formation of the future Indonesian armed forces, and mainly took the role of foe during Indonesian National Revolution in 1945 to 1949, the KNIL had also provided military training and infrastructure for some of the future TNI officers and other ranks. There were military training centres, military schools and academies in the Dutch East Indies. Next to Dutch volunteers and European mercenaries, the KNIL also recruited indigenous, especially Ambonese, Kai Islanders, Timorese, and Minahasan people. In 1940, with the Netherlands under German occupation and the Japanese pressing for access to Dutch East Indies oil supplies, the Dutch had opened up the KNIL to large intakes of previously excluded Javanese. Some of the indigenous soldiers that had enjoyed Dutch KNIL military academy education would later become important TNI officers, for example Suharto and Abdul Haris Nasution.

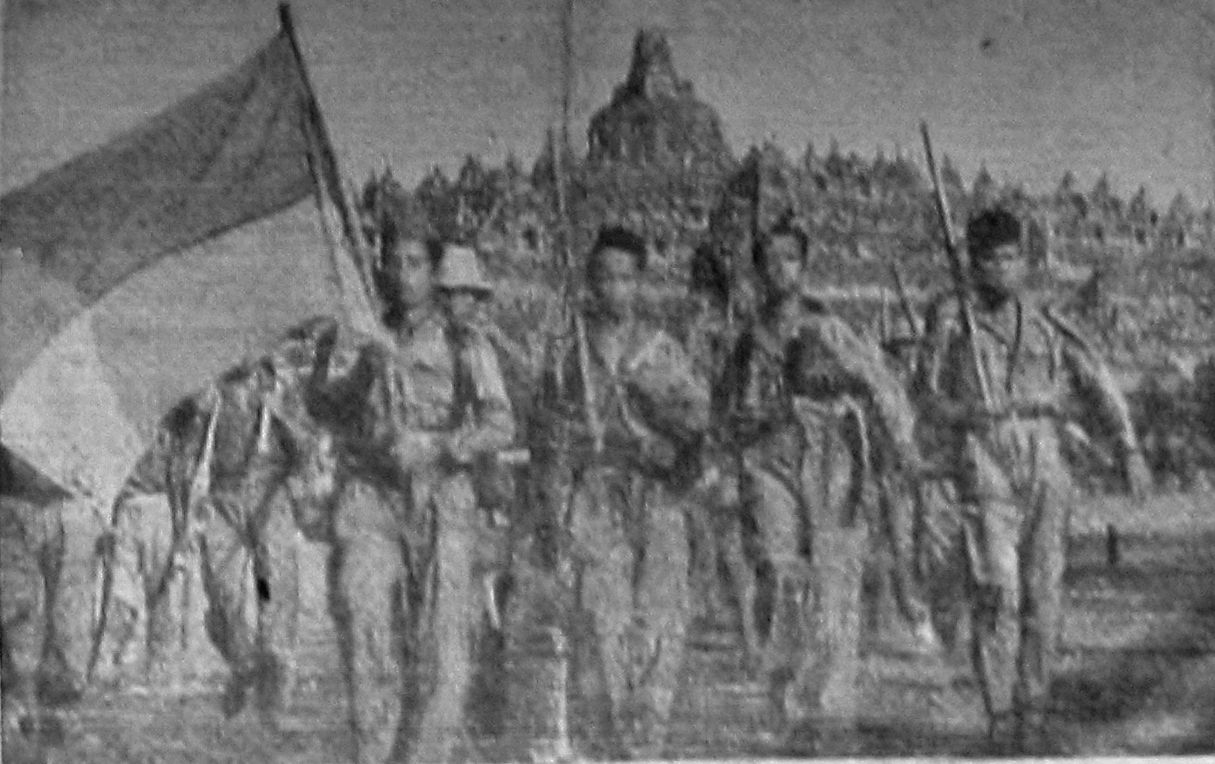
Indonesian soldiers in front of Borobudur, March 1947

Indonesian nationalism and militarism started to gain momentum and support in World War II during the Japanese occupation of the Dutch East Indies. To gain support from the Indonesian people in their war against the Western Allied force, Japan started to encourage and back Indonesian nationalistic movements by providing Indonesian youth with military training and weapons. On 3 October 1943, the Japanese military formed the Indonesian volunteer army called PETA (Pembela Tanah Air; Defenders of the Homeland). The Japanese intended for PETA to assist their forces and oppose a possible invasion by the Allies. The Japanese military training for Indonesian youth was originally meant to rally local support for the Empire of Japan but later became a significant resource for the Republic of Indonesia during the Indonesian National Revolution from 1945 to 1949. Many of these men who served in PETA, both officers and NCOs alike including Sudirman, formed the majority of the personnel that would compose the future armed forces.

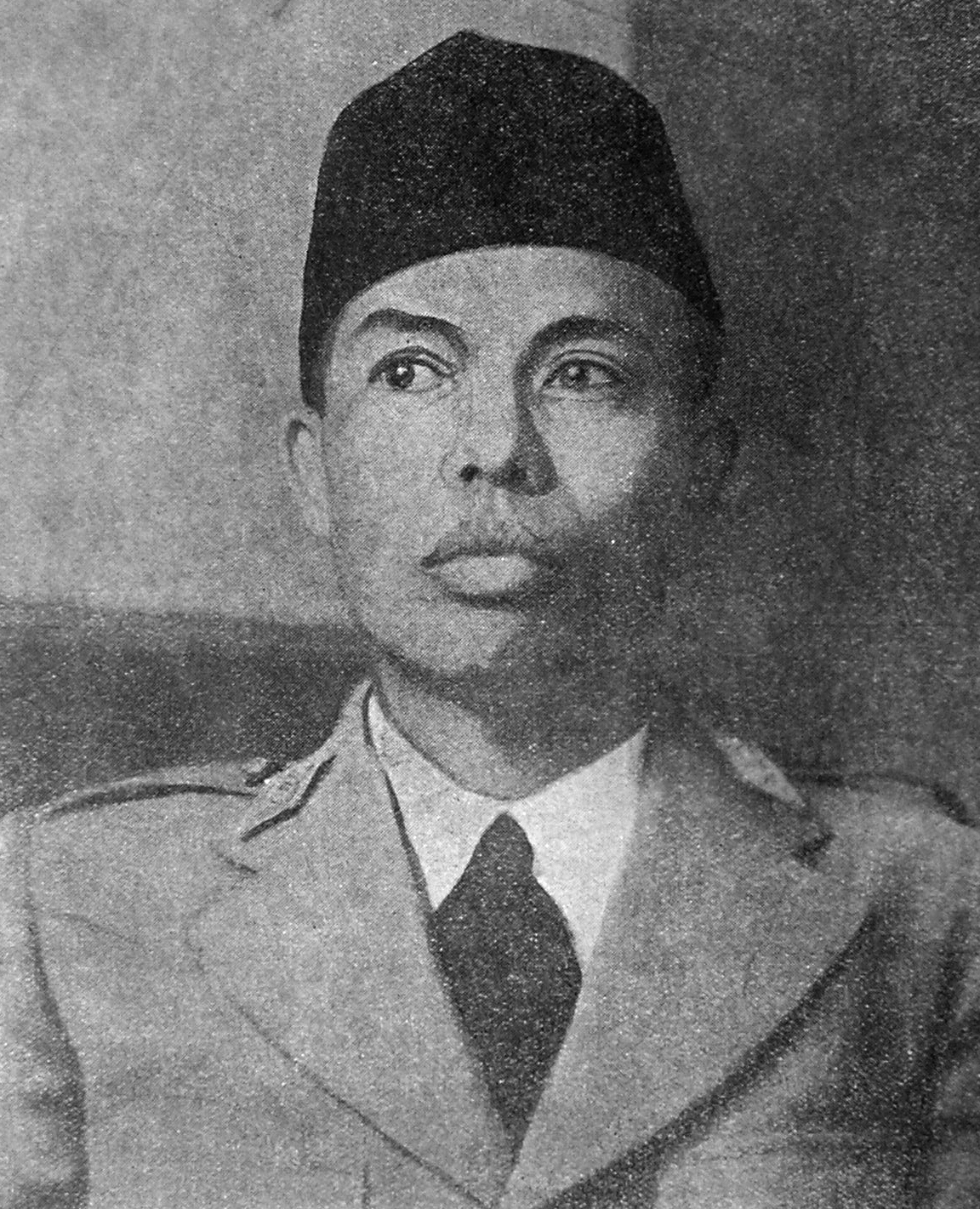
General Sudirman, first commander of the Indonesian Armed Forces

The Indonesian Armed Forces started out as the People's Security Agency (Badan Keamanan Rakyat, BKR), which was formed in the third PPKI meeting, on 29 August 1945. BKR united militias across the newly independent country to maintain civil order; it was more of a constabulary than an army. The decision to create a "security agency", and not an army, was taken to avoid the Allied forces seeing it as an armed revolution and invading in full force. One of the terms of surrender to Japan was to return the Asian colonies they had conquered to their previous rulers, certainly not to make them independent.

When confrontations became sharp and hostile between Indonesia and the Allied forces, on 5 October 1945 the People's Security Forces (Tentara Keamanan Rakyat, TKR) was formed on the basis of existing BKR units; this was a move taken to formalise, unite, and organise the splintered pockets of independent troopers (laskar) across Indonesia, ensuing a more professional military approach, to contend with the Netherlands and the Allied force invaders.

The Indonesian armed forces have seen significant action since their establishment in 1945. Their first conflict was the 1945–1949 Indonesian National Revolution, in which the 1945 Battle of Surabaya was especially important as the baptism of fire of the young armed forces.

In January 1946, TKR renamed as the People's Safety Forces (Tentara Keselamatan Rakyat, TKR), then succeeded by Armed Forces of the Republic of Indonesia (Tentara Republik Indonesia, TRI), in a further step to professionalise the armed forces and increase its ability to engage systematically.

In June 1947, the TRI, per a government decision, was renamed the Indonesian National Armed Forces (Tentara Nasional Indonesia, TNI) which was a merger between the TRI and the independent paramilitary organisations (laskar) across Indonesia, becoming by 1950 the War Forces of the United States of Indonesia (Angkatan Perang Republik Indonesia Serikat, APRIS), by mid year the War Forces of the Republic of Indonesia (Angkatan Perang Republik Indonesia, APRI), also absolving native personnel from within both the former KNIL and KM within the expanded republic.

According to the official website of Indonesian veterans, there were 863,432 people who joined the struggle for Indonesian independence and this included those who were members of the militia, police, intelligence and auxiliary and as of 2023, there are still 25,676 Indonesian National Revolution veterans alive.

Emblem of the Armed Forces of the Republic of Indonesia (ABRI) (1962–1999)

On 21 June 1962, the name Tentara Nasional Indonesia (TNI) was changed to Angkatan Bersenjata Republik Indonesia (Armed Forces of the Republic of Indonesia, ABRI). The POLRI (Indonesian National Police) was integrated under the Armed Forces and changed its name to Angkatan Kepolisian (Police Force), and its commander maintained the concurrent status of Minister of Defense and Security, reporting to the President, who is commander in chief. The commanding generals (later chiefs of staff) and the Chief of the National Police then all held ministerial status as members of the cabinet of the republic, while a number of higher-ranking officers were appointed to other cabinet posts. On 1 July 1969, the Police Force's name was reverted to "POLRI".

After the fall of Suharto in 1998, the democratic and civil movement grew against the acute military role and involvements in Indonesian politics. As a result, the post-Suharto Indonesian military has undergone certain reforms, such as the revocation of the Dwifungsi doctrine and the terminations of military controlled business. The reforms also involved law enforcement in common civil society, which questioned the position of Indonesian police under the military corps umbrella. These reforms led to the separation of the police force from the military. In April 1999, the Indonesian National Police officially regained its independence and now is a separate entity from the armed forces proper. The official name of the Indonesian armed forces also changed from Angkatan Bersenjata Republik Indonesia (ABRI) back to Tentara Nasional Indonesia (TNI).

=== Future plans ===
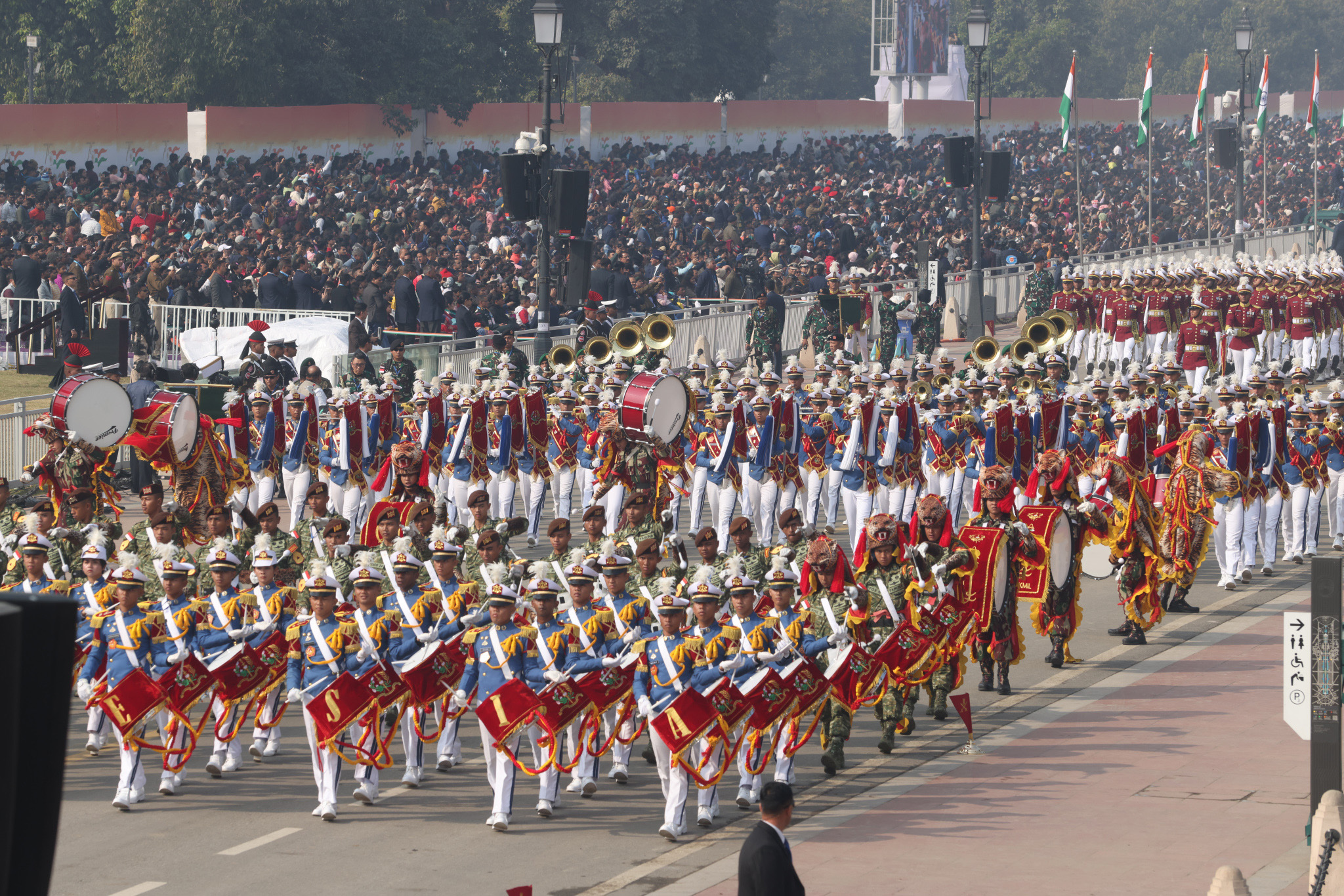
Indonesian combined military band in Indian Republic day parade rehearsal.

At the beginning of 2010, the Indonesian government sought to strengthen the TNI to achieve minimum standards of minimum strength called "Kekuatan Pokok Minimum" (Minimum Essential Force, or MEF). The MEF was divided into three strategic five-year plan stages, 2010–2014, 2015–2019, and 2020–2024. Initially the government budgeted Rp156 trillion (around US$16 billion at the time) for the provision of TNI's main weapon system equipment (known as alutsista, an abbreviation for Alat Utama Sistem Senjata or "Main Weapons System") in the MEF period 2010–2014.

=== Naming history ===
- People's Security Agency (Badan Keamanan Rakyat, 22 August – 5 October 1945; spelled Ra'jat)
- People's Security Forces (Tentara Keamanan Rakyat, 5 October 1945 – 7 January 1946; spelled Ra'jat)
- People's Safety Forces (Tentara Keselamatan Rakyat, 7–26 January 1946; spelled Ra'jat)
- Armed Forces of the Republic of Indonesia (Tentara Republik Indonesia, 26 January 1946 – 3 June 1947; spelled Repoeblik until 17 March 1947)
- Indonesian National Armed Forces (Tentara Nasional Indonesia, 3 June 1947 – 27 December 1949)
- War Forces of the Republic of the United States of Indonesia (Angkatan Perang Republik Indonesia Serikat, 27 December 1949 – 17 August 1950)
- War Forces of the Republic of Indonesia (Angkatan Perang Republik Indonesia, 17 August 1950 – 21 June 1962)
- Armed Forces of the Republic of Indonesia (Angkatan Bersenjata Republik Indonesia, 21 June 1962 – 1 April 1999; spelled Bersendjata until 1 January 1973)*
- Indonesian National Armed Forces (Tentara Nasional Indonesia, since 1 April 1999)

*the name TNI was still used during ABRI era when it came to the military itself and the branches excluding the Police (e.g. TNI-AD/AL/AU). But when it was Armed Forces as a whole, including the Police, the term ABRI was used instead.

== Philosophy and doctrine ==
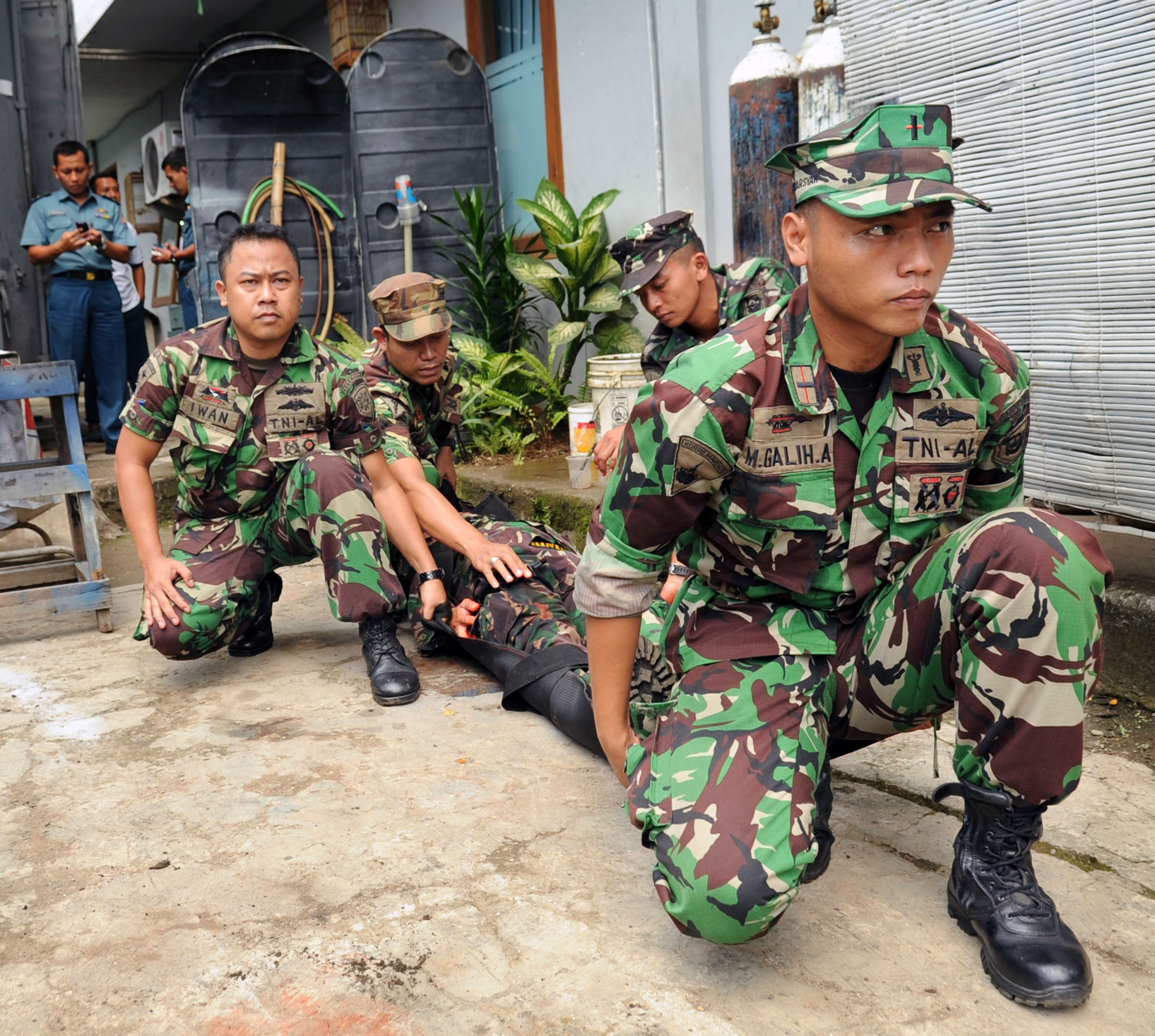
Indonesian soldiers participate in a mass casualty training scenario as part of exercise Cooperation Afloat Readiness and Training (CARAT)

The Indonesian military philosophy about the defence of the archipelago is summarily civilian-military defence, called "Total People's Defense", consisting of a three-stage war: a short initial period in which an invader would defeat a conventional Indonesian military, a long period of territorial guerrilla warfare followed by a final stage of expulsion, with the military acting as a rallying point for defence from grass-roots village level upwards. The doctrine relies on a close bond between villager and soldier to encourage the support of the entire population and enable the armed forces to manage all war-related resources.

The civilian population would provide logistical support, intelligence, and upkeep with some of the population that is armed forces-trained to join the guerrilla struggle against the aggressor. The armed forces regularly engage in large-scale community and rural development. The "Armed Forces Enters the Village" (AMD/TMMD) program, begun in 1983, is held three times annually to organise and assist construction and development of civilian village projects.

The current developments in Indonesia's defence policies are framed within the concept of achieving "Minimum Essential Force" or MEF by 2024. This concept of MEF was first articulated in Presidential Decree No. 7/2008 on General Policy Guidelines on State Defense Policy which came into effect on 26 January 2008. MEF is defined as a capability based defence and force level that can guarantee the attainment of immediate strategic defence interests, where the procurement priority is given to the improvement of minimum defence strength and/or the replacement of outdated main weapon systems/equipment. To achieve this aim, MEF had been restructured into a series of 3 strategic programs with timeframes from 2010 to 2014, 2015 to 2019 and 2020 to 2024 as well as spending of up to 1.5–2% of the GDP.

The identity of the Indonesian National Armed forces is as defined by the Article 2 of the Law No 34/2004 on Indonesian National Armed forces is the TNI must aim to become the:

1. People's Military Forces, the armed forces whose serving personnel come from Indonesian citizens from all walks of life;
2. Military of Warriors, which are soldiers who fought to establish the Unitary State of the Republic of Indonesia and do not recognise surrender in carrying out and completing its obligations;
3. National Armed Forces, the Indonesian national armed forces who serve in the interest of the country and her people over the interests of the regions/provinces, ethnic groups, races, and religions;
4. and Professional Armed Forces, an armed forces that is well-trained, well-educated, well-equipped, non-practicable, prohibited to do business and politics and guaranteed welfare, and following the country's political policies that embrace democratic principles, civil supremacy, human rights, and the provisions of national law and international laws in force, as ratified and approved in the 1999–2003 amendments to the Constitution.

== Operations ==
The military in Indonesia has evolved as an apparatus for defence based on political decisions. Indonesia has deployed forces in several UN peacekeeping operations, including in Lebanon and Democratic Republic of Congo (DRC), and has sent over 24,000 peacekeeping personnel to UN missions since 1957.

The armed forces are tasked with military operations other than war, which include deterring radicalism and terrorism, securing critical infrastructure such as border controls, protecting dignitaries, providing disaster relief, and assisting the government in securing flight and maritime routes against hijacking, piracy, and trafficking.

== Organisation ==
The Indonesian armed forces have long been organised around territorial commands. Following independence, seven were established by 1958. No central reserve formation was formed until 1961 (when the 1st Army Corps of the Army General Reserve, "CADUAD", the precursor of today's Kostrad, was established). It was only after the attempted coup d'état of 1 October 1965 and General Suharto's rise to the presidency that it became possible to integrate the armed forces and begin to develop a joint operations structure.

Following a decision in 1985, a major reorganisation separated the Ministry of Defense and Security from the ABRI (Angkatan Bersenjata Republik Indonesia, the name of the armed forces used during the New Order) headquarters and staff. MoDS was made responsible for planning, acquisition, and management tasks but had no command or control of troop units. The ABRI Commander in chief retained command and control of all armed forces and continued by tradition to be the senior military officer in the country, while continuing to be a part of the cabinet.

The administrative structure of Ministry of Defense and Security consisted of a minister, deputy minister, secretary general, inspector general, three directorates-general and a number of functional centres and institutes. The minister, deputy minister, inspector general, and three directors general were retired senior military officers; the secretary general (who acted as deputy minister) and most functional centre chiefs were, as is the case today, active-duty military officers, while employees and staff were personnel of the armed forces and of the civil service.

The 1985 reorganisation also made significant changes in the armed forces chain of command. The four multi-service Regional Defense Commands ("Kowilhans") and the National Strategic Command ("Kostranas") were eliminated from the defence structure, establishing the Military Regional Command ("Kodam"), or area command, as the key organisation for strategic, tactical, and territorial operations for all services. The chain of command flowed directly from the "ABRI" commander in chief to the ten "Kodam" commanders, and then to subordinate army territorial commands. The former territorial commands of the air force and navy were eliminated from the structure altogether, with each of those services represented on the "Kodam" staff by a senior liaison officer. The navy and air force territorial commands were replaced by operational commands. The air force formed two Operational Commands ("Ko-Ops") while the navy had its two Fleet Commands, the Western and Eastern Armadas. The air force's National Air Defense Command ("Kohanudnas") remained under the "ABRI" commander in chief. It had an essentially defensive function that included responsibility for the early warning system.

After Suharto's presidential era collapsed in 1998, the Indonesian National Police was separated from the Armed Forces making the Indonesian Armed Forces under the direct auspices command of the Ministry of Defense and the Police Force under the direct auspices of the President of Indonesia. Before 1998, the Armed Forces of the Republic of Indonesia (the then name "ABRI") was composed of four service branches: Indonesian Army, Indonesian Navy, Indonesian Air Force, and the Indonesian National Police. Then after 1998 (After reformation from Soeharto), the Armed Forces' name, in 1999, was changed to TNI (Tentara Nasional Indonesia) literally meaning: "The National Military of Indonesia" and the independent Indonesian Police Force changed its name to POLRI (Kepolisian Negara Republik Indonesia) literally meaning: "The National Police Force of Indonesia". Now specifically, although the Armed Forces of Indonesia and the National Police of Indonesia has been separated, they still cooperate and conduct special duties and tasks together for the sake of the national security and integrity of Indonesia.

On 13 May 2018, Commander Hadi Tjahjanto reorganised the armed forces once more by inaugurating 4 new military units: Kostrad's 3rd Infantry Division, Navy's 3rd Fleet Command, Air Force's 3rd Air Force Operations Command, and Marine Force III. The new military units are intended to reduce response time against any threats and problems in Eastern Indonesia. He also officially renamed the Western and Eastern Fleet Commands to 1st and 2nd Fleet Commands.

The Indonesian National Armed Forces is structured into the following in accordance with Presidential Regulation No. 66/2019, later revised with Presidential Regulation No. 84/2025. The organisation of the Indonesian National Armed Forces consists of Indonesian National Armed Forces General Headquarters (Markas Besar Tentara Nasional Indonesia) based in the Joint Armed Forces Headquarters in Cilangkap, East Jakarta, of which it oversee the headquarters of the three branch of the military:

- Indonesian Army Headquarters (Markas Besar Tentara Nasional Indonesia Angkatan Darat), based in Gambir, Central Jakarta;
- Indonesian Navy Headquarters (Markas Besar Tentara Nasional Indonesia Angkatan Laut), based in Cilangkap, East Jakarta; and
- Indonesian Air Force Headquarters (Markas Besar Tentara Nasional Indonesia Angkatan Udara), also based in Cilangkap, East Jakarta

=== Armed Forces Headquarters Organization ===
==== Leadership elements ====
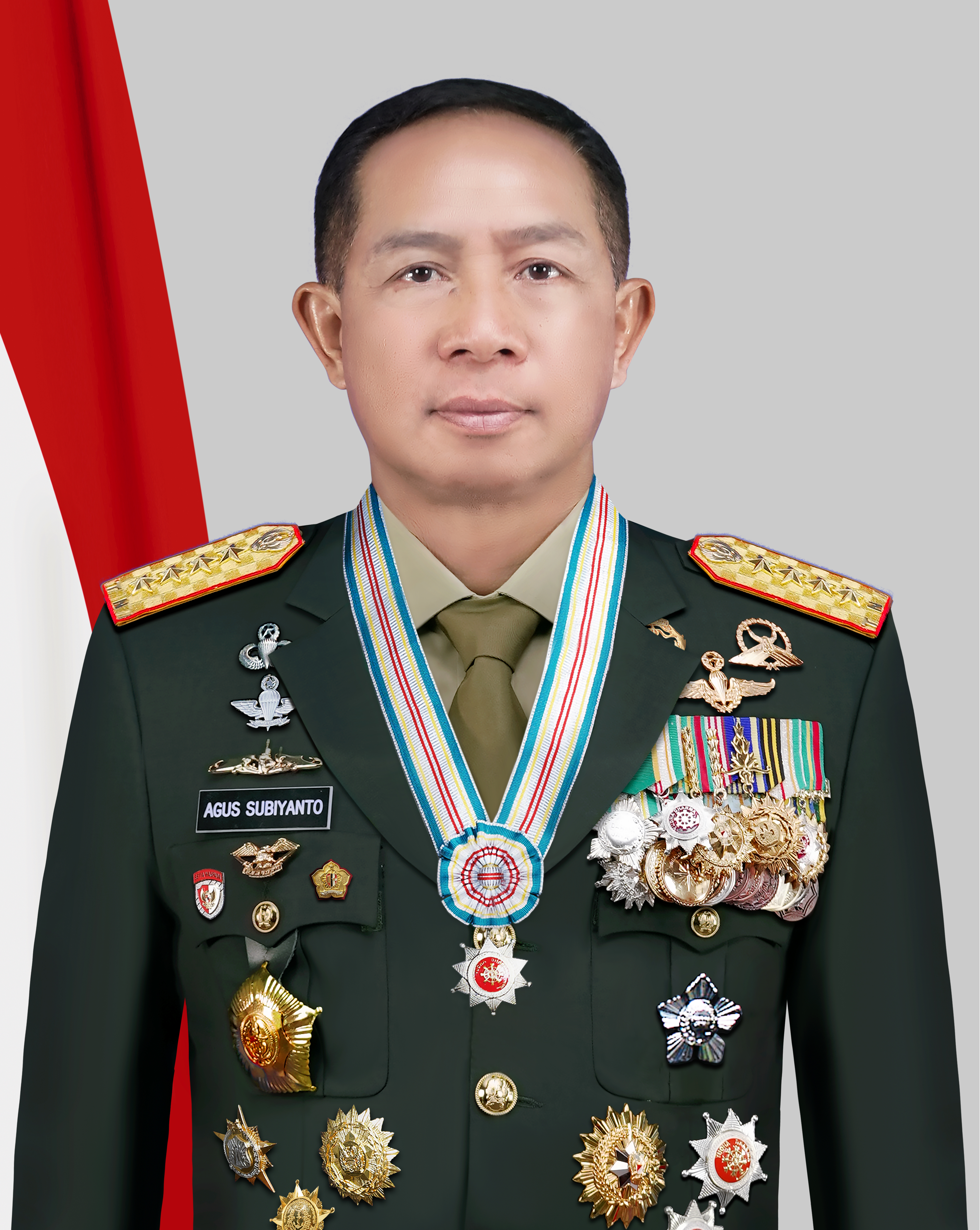
The current Panglima (Commander) of the Indonesian National Armed Forces, General Agus Subiyanto of the Army

The leadership elements of the Indonesian armed forces consist of the Commander of the Indonesian National Armed Forces (Panglima TNI) and the Deputy Commander of the Indonesian National Armed Forces, both position are held by four-star Generals/Admirals/Air Marshals appointed by and reporting directly to the President of Indonesia, who is the overall commander-in-chief of the armed forces. As of August 2025, the deputy commander of the armed forces is General Tandyo Budi Revita.

- Commander of the Indonesian National Armed Forces (Panglima Tentara Nasional Indonesia); and
- Deputy Commander of the Indonesian National Armed Forces (Wakil Panglima Tentara Nasional Indonesia).

==== Leadership support elements ====
1. Armed Forces General Staff (Staf Umum)
2. Armed Forces Inspectorate General (Inspektorat Jenderal)
3. Armed Forces Strategic Policy and General Planning Staff (Staf Kebijakan Strategis dan Perencanaan Umum)
4. Armed Forces Operations Staff (Staf Operasi)
5. Armed Forces Commander Advisory Staff (Staf Ahli Panglima)
6. Armed Forces Intelligence Staff (Staf Intelijen)
7. Armed Forces Personnel Staff (Staf Personalia)
8. Armed Forces Logistics Staff (Staf Logistik)
9. Armed Forces Territorial Staff (Staf Teritorial)
10. Armed Forces Communication and Electronics Staff (Staf Komunikasi dan Elektronik)

==== Service Elements ====
1. Armed Forces Electronics and Communication Unit (Satuan Komunikasi dan Elektronika)
2. Armed Forces Operations Control Center (Pusat Pengendalian Operasi)
3. Armed Forces Secretariat General (Sekretariat Umum)
4. Armed Forces General Headquarters and Services Detachment (Detasemen Markas Besar)

==== Central Executive Agencies ====
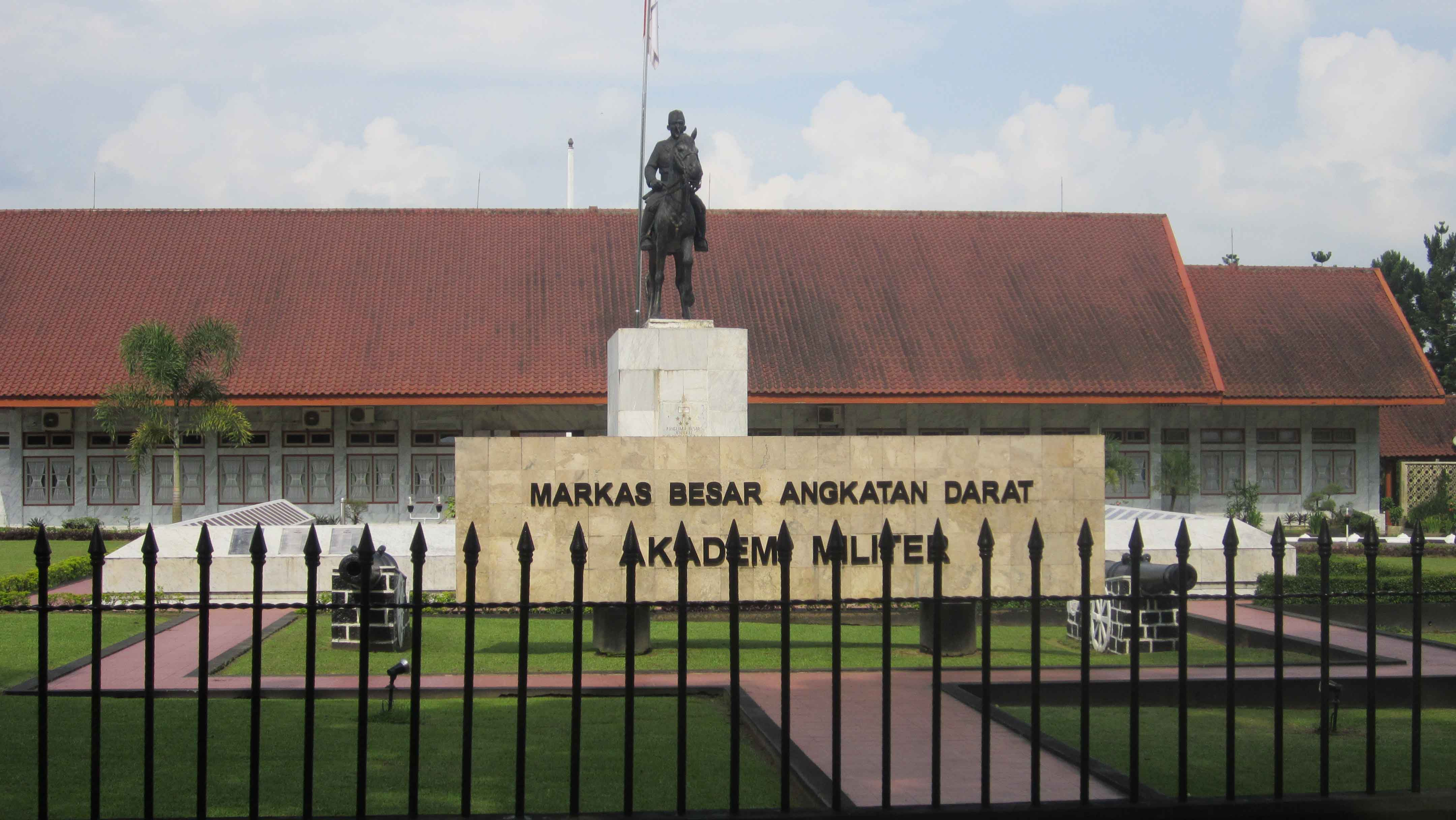
Military Academy of Indonesia

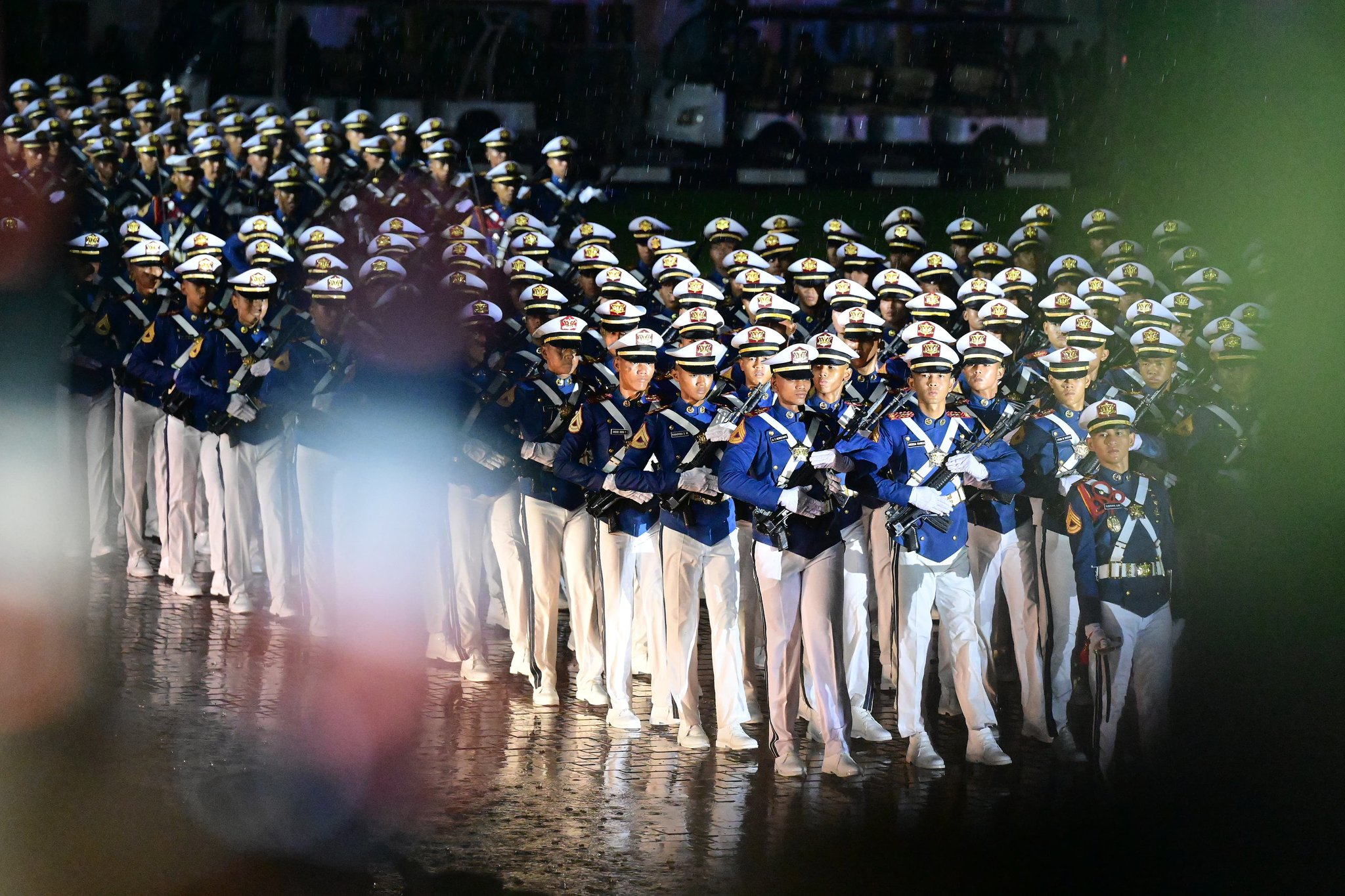
Indonesian Armed Forces Academy cadets / Taruna

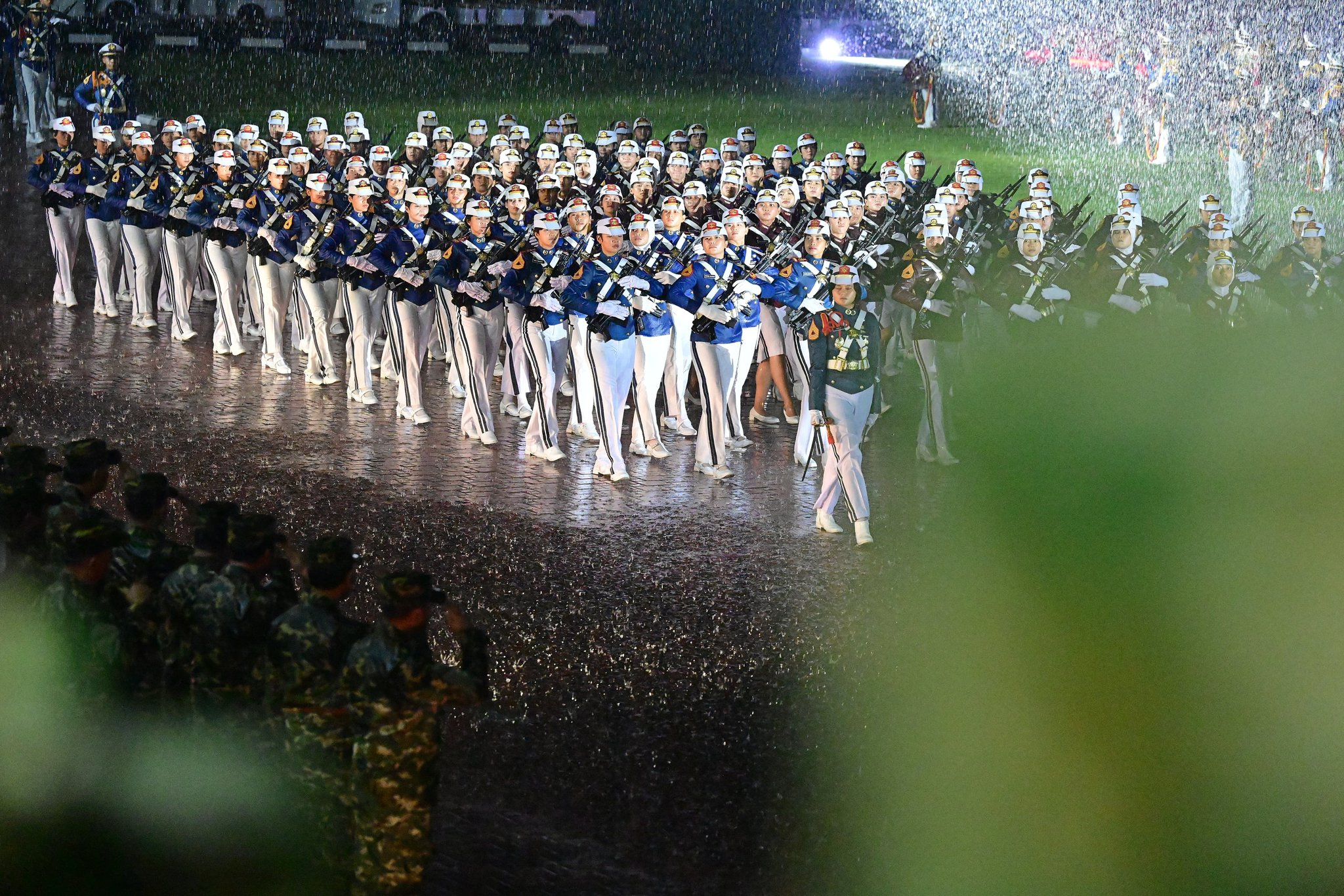
Indonesian Armed Forces Academy female cadets / Taruni

1. Armed Forces Command and Staff Colleges (Sekolah Staf dan Komando TNI/Sesko TNI) based in Bandung, which consist of:
  - Army Command and Staff College, based in Bandung;
  - Naval Command and Staff College, based in Cipulir, South Jakarta; and
  - Air Force Command and Staff College, based in Lembang, West Bandung.
2. Armed Forces Academy (Akademi TNI), based in Cilangkap, which consist of:
  - Military Academy, based in Magelang;
  - Naval Academy, based in Surabaya; and
  - Air Force Academy, based in Yogyakarta.
3. Armed Forces Strategic Intelligence Agency (Badan Intelijen Strategis TNI/ BAIS TNI);
4. Armed Forces Education, Training and Doctrine Development Command (Komando Pembinaan Doktrin, Pendidikan, dan Pelatihan TNI/ Kodiklat TNI);
  - Army Training, Education and Doctrine Development Command, based in Bandung;
  - Naval Training, Education and Doctrine Development Command, based in Surabaya; and
  - Air Force Training, Education and Doctrine Development Command, based in East Jakarta.
5. Armed Forces Special Operations Command (Komando Operasi Khusus/ Koopssus TNI);
6. Indonesian Presidential Security Forces (Pasukan Pengamanan Presiden/ Paspampres);
7. Armed Forces Legal and Human Rights Agency (Badan Pembinaan Hukum dan Hak Asasi Manusia TNI), which also oversee the Armed Forces prosecutors' office (Oditurat) and correctional facilities.
8. Armed Forces Logistics Agency (Badan Logistik TNI);
9. Armed Forces Information Center (Pusat Penerangan/ Puspen TNI);
10. Armed Forces Medical Center (Pusat Kesehatan/ Puskes TNI);
11. Armed Forces Military Police Center (Pusat Polisi Militer/ Puspom TNI);
12. Armed Forces Finance Center (Pusat Keuangan/ Pusku TNI);
13. Armed Forces Peacekeeping Missions Center (Pusat Misi Pemeliharaan Perdamaian/ PMPP TNI)
14. Armed Forces Strategic Assessment, Research, and Development Center (Pusat Pengkajian Strategis, Penelitian, dan Pengembangan/ Pusjianstralitbang TNI);
15. Armed Forces Psychology Center (Pusat Psikologi TNI)
16. Armed Forces Mental Guidance and Chaplaincy Center (Pusat Pembinaan Mental/ Pusbintal TNI);
17. Armed Forces Historical Heritage Center (Pusat Sejarah/ Pusjarah TNI);
18. Armed Forces Information and Data Processing Center (Pusat Informasi dan Pengolahan Data/ Pusinfolahta TNI);
19. Armed Forces International Cooperation Center (Pusat Kerjasama Internasional/ Puskersin TNI);
20. Armed Forces Physical Fitness and Basic Military Regulation Center (Pusat Jasmani dan Peraturan Militer Dasar/ Pusjaspermildas TNI);
21. Armed Forces Procurement Center (Pusat Pengadaan/ Pusada TNI);
22. Armed Forces Maritime Information Center (Pusat Informasi Maritim/ Pusinfomar TNI);
23. Armed Forces Bureaucratic Reform Center (Pusat Reformasi Birokrasi TNI);
24. Armed Forces Personnel Administration Center (Pusat Administrasi Personel TNI );
25. Armed Forces Permanent Garrison Commands (Komando Garnisun Tetap/ Kogartap), which consist of:
  - 1st Permanent Garrison Command/Jakarta
  - 2nd Permanent Garrison Command/Bandung
  - 3rd Permanent Garrison Command/Surabaya
26. Armed Forces Cyber Operations Unit (Satuan Siber/ Satsiber TNI)

==== Principal Operational Commands ====
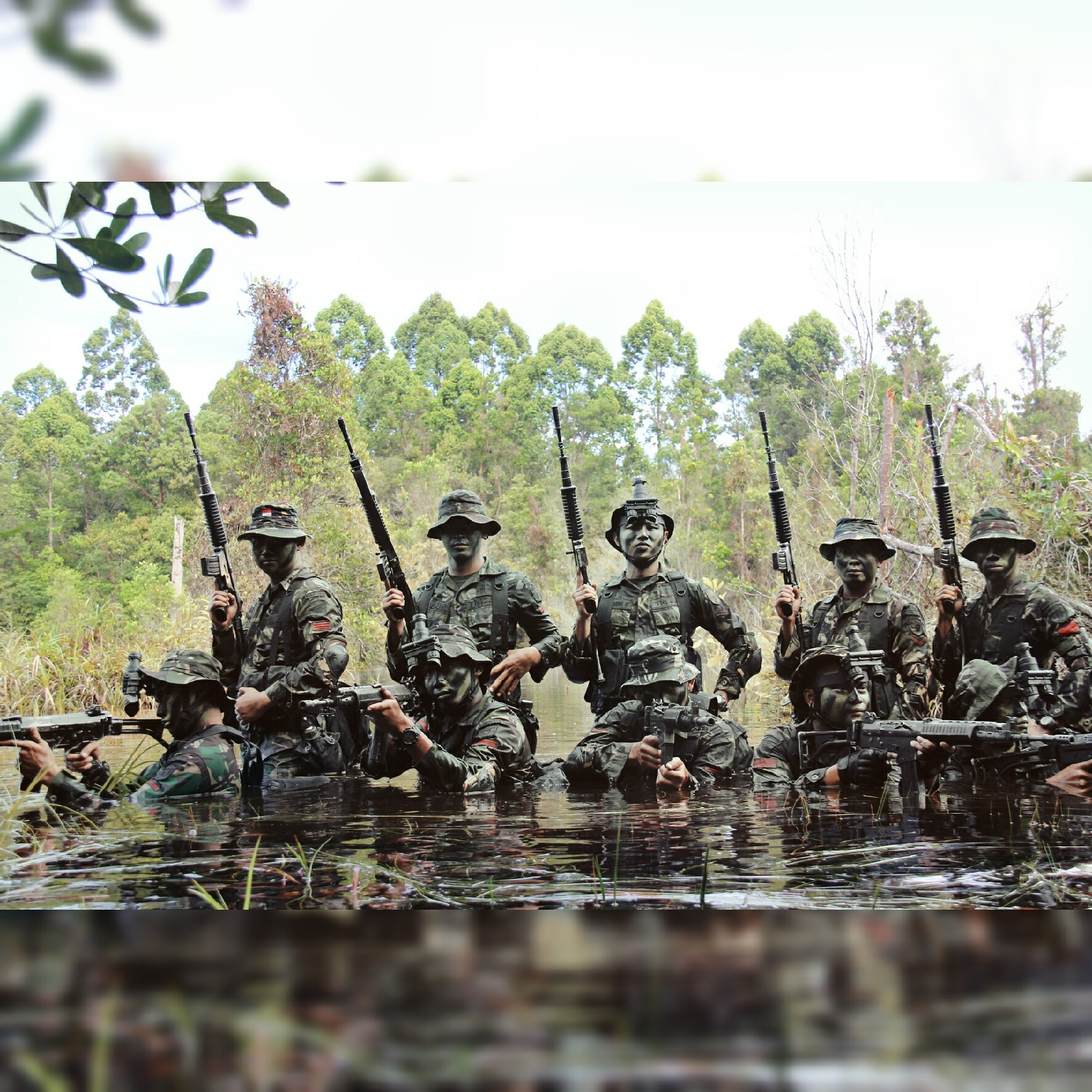
Indonesian Army Infantry soldiers is one of the main combatant forces of the Indonesian armed forces

The Principal Operational Commands (Komando Utama Operasi TNI) are the centralised TNI forces which are under the command of the Armed Forces General Headquarters. Some of these commands are actually part of the three military branches (such as Kostrad and Koarmada RI, armed and trained by the Army and Navy, respectively), but these are operationally controlled by the Armed Forces General Headquarters.

Direct control by Armed Forces General Headquarters:

1. Defense Area Joint Command (Komando Gabungan Wilayah Pertahanan / Kogabwilhan), tasked with coordinating and integrating operational readiness of all military bases throughout Indonesia. Command held by three-star General/Admiral/Air Marshall.
2. Indonesian National Air Defense Forces Command (Komando Pertahanan Udara Nasional Indonesia), tasked with integrating air and space security assets. Command held by three-star Air Marshall.

Readiness maintained under Army Headquarters:

1. Army Strategic Reserve Command (Komando Cadangan Strategis Angkatan Darat / Kostrad) as main combat Army force. Command held by three-star General.
2. Special Forces Command (Komando Pasukan Khusus / Kopassus). Command held by three-star General. It conducts special operations of the Army.
3. Military Regional Commands (Komando Daerah Militer / Kodam). Command held by two-star General. It consists of twenty-one Military Region Commands (Kodams) territorially spread across Indonesia.

Readiness maintained under Navy Headquarters:

1. Indonesian Fleet Command (Komando Armada Republik Indonesia / Koarmada RI). Command held by three-star Admiral. It consists of:
  - 14 Naval Region Commands as Naval territorial commands spread across Indonesia, tasked with maintaining Naval Bases; and
  - 3 Fleet Commands (1st, 2nd, and 3rd Fleet Command), consists of various naval task forces.
2. Naval Hydro-Oceanographic Center (Pusat Hidro-Oseanografi TNI Angkatan Laut), based in North Jakarta. Tasked with providing hydrographic and oceanographic data and information, both for military and civilian use. Command held by three-star Admiral.
3. Indonesian Marine Corps (Korps Marinir Republik Indonesia / Kormar RI) conducts operations as naval infantry force. Command held by three-star Marine General. It consists of 3 Marine Forces and 1 independent marine infantry brigade.
4. Military Sealift Command (Komando Lintas Laut Militer / Kolinlamil). Command held by two-star Admiral. It conduct maritime transportation and logistic transferring.

Readiness maintained under Air Force Headquarters:

1. National Air Operations Command (Komando Operasi Udara Nasional / Koopsudnas). Command held by three-star Air Marshall. It consists of:
  - 3 Air Force Regional Commands as Air Force territorial commands spread across Indonesia, tasked with maintaining Air Force Bases;
  - Air Force Operation Command oversees operational radar units and air wings;
  - National Air Operation Command Space Unit.
2. Quick Reaction Forces Corps (Korps Pasukan Gerak Cepat / Korpasgat) conducts operations as Air Force infantry. Command held by three-star Air Marshall;

=== Branches ===
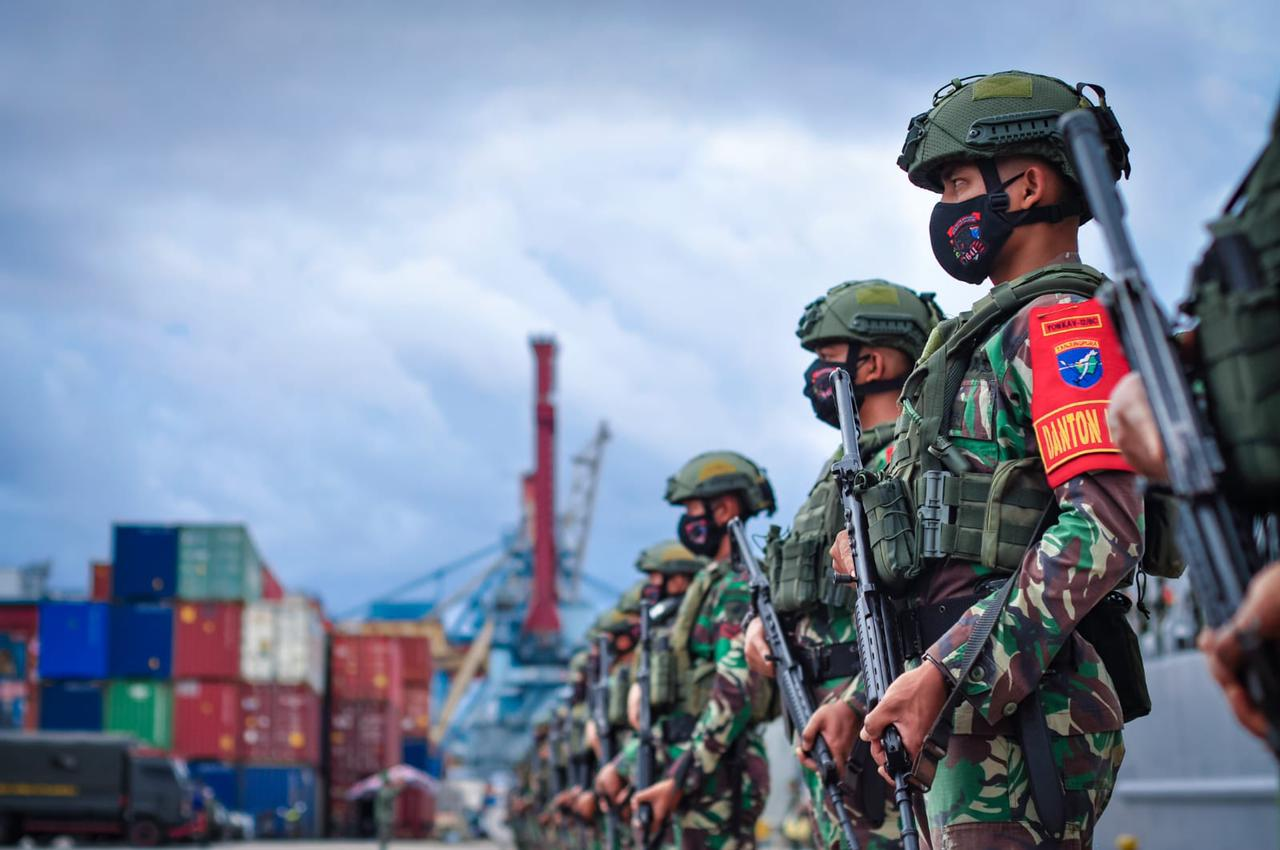
Indonesian Army soldiers of the 641st Raider Infantry Battalion/Beruang, 19th Infantry Brigade/Khatulistiwa, Kodam XII/Tanjungpura

TNI has three service branches, the Army (TNI-AD), the Navy (TNI-AL), and the Air Force (TNI-AU). Each service branch is led by a Chief of staff (Chief of Staff of the Army, Chief of Staff of the Navy, and Chief of Staff of the Air Force respectively) who is responsible for the administration and capability development for his/her own branch. These positions were previously called Commander or Panglima (for some period in 60s, it is a Minister-equivalent post) which was equipped with commanding authority until it was changed as Chief of Staffs (until now). In the present day, the Commander of the Indonesian National Armed Forces is the only military officer holding commanding authority for all the service branches under the overall authority of the President as Supreme Commander of the Armed Forces.

- The TNI-AD (Indonesian Army) was first formed in 1945 following the end of World War II, to protect the newly independent country. It initially consisted of local militia and grew to become the regular army of today. The force now has up to 306,506 personnel, and comprises major strong territorial army commands known as Kodam and several independent regiments, brigades and battalions. The Army is also built up of operational commands and special forces such as the: Kopassus and the Kostrad units also with other types of formation within the Army itself. The Army also operates aircraft under the Army Aviation Command (Pusat Penerbangan Angkatan Darat). The Army operates 123 helicopters including combat, transport, and trainer models, and eight fixed-wing aircraft. (Note: The total numbers of aircraft as of February 2021. For more info please go to List of equipment of the Indonesian Army#Aircraft) The Army also guards and patrols the land borders with Malaysia, Papua New Guinea, and East Timor.

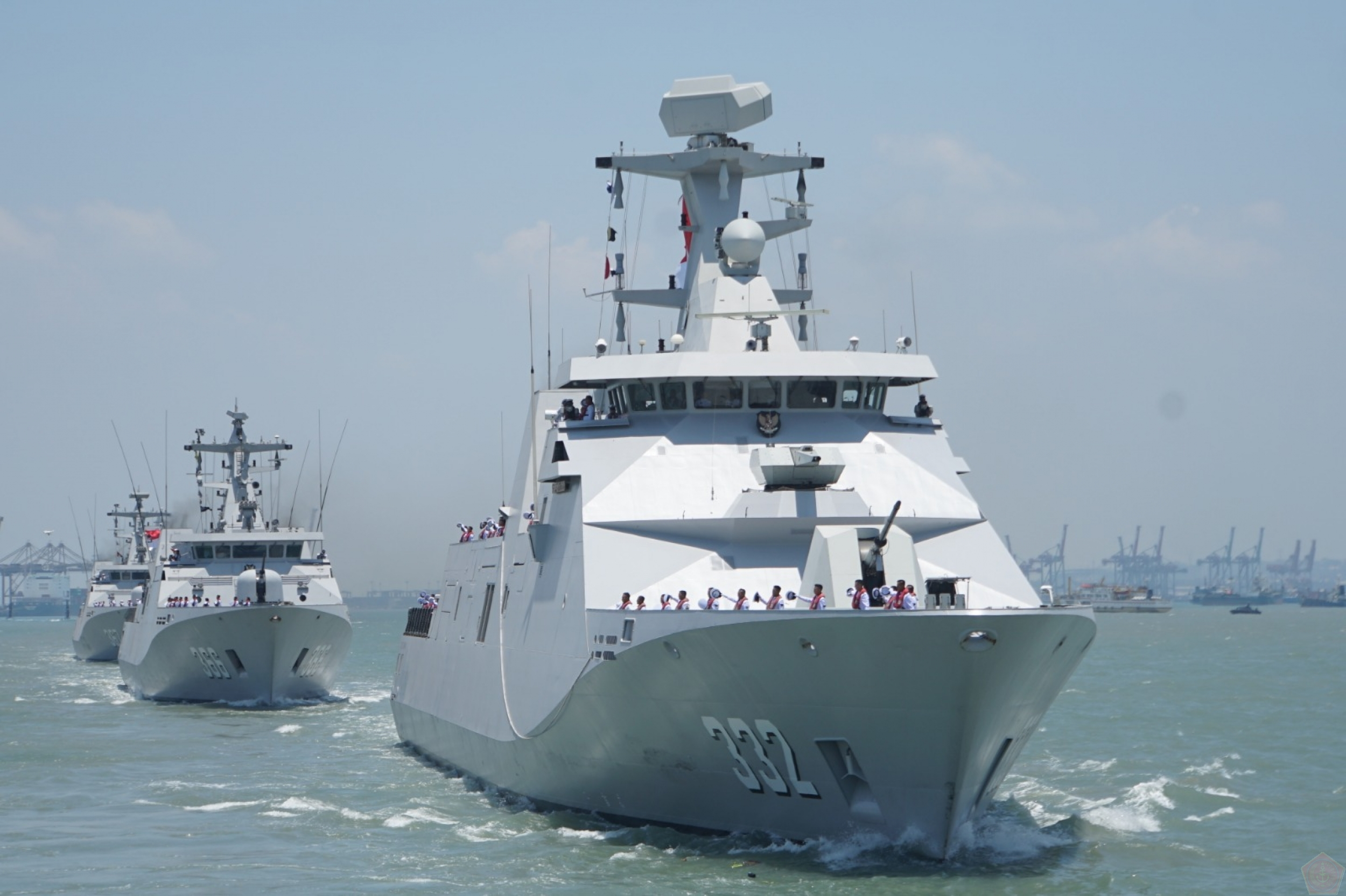
Indonesian Navy Frigate KRI I Gusti Ngurah Rai 332 and Corvettes KRI Sultan Hasanuddin 366, KRI Sultan Iskandar Muda 367

- The TNI-AL (Indonesian Navy) was first formed on 22 August 1945. The current strength of the Navy is around up-to 74,000. In contrast to many other nations and military traditions, the Navy uses Army style ranks (See: Indonesian military ranks). The Navy has one centralised fleet command (Indonesian Fleet Command at Jakarta) which consists of three navy fleets which are the 1st Fleet Command (Koarmada I) based in Tanjungpinang, the 2nd Fleet Command (Koarmada II) based in Surabaya, and the 3rd Fleet Command (Koarmada III) based in Sorong, all three fleet forces commands holding responsibility for the defence of the three maritime and naval territorial commands. The Navy also has a management of aircraft and aviation systems which are operated by the Naval Aviation Center (Pusat Penerbangan Angkatan Laut). The Navy operates 63 fixed wing aircraft and 29 combat and transport helicopters. (Note: The total numbers of aircraft as of February 2021. For more info please go to List of equipment of the Indonesian Navy#Aircraft) The Navy also includes the Indonesian Marine Corps (Korps Marinir, or KorMar). It was created on 15 November 1945 and has the duties of being the main naval infantry and amphibious warfare force with quick reaction capabilities and special operations abilities.

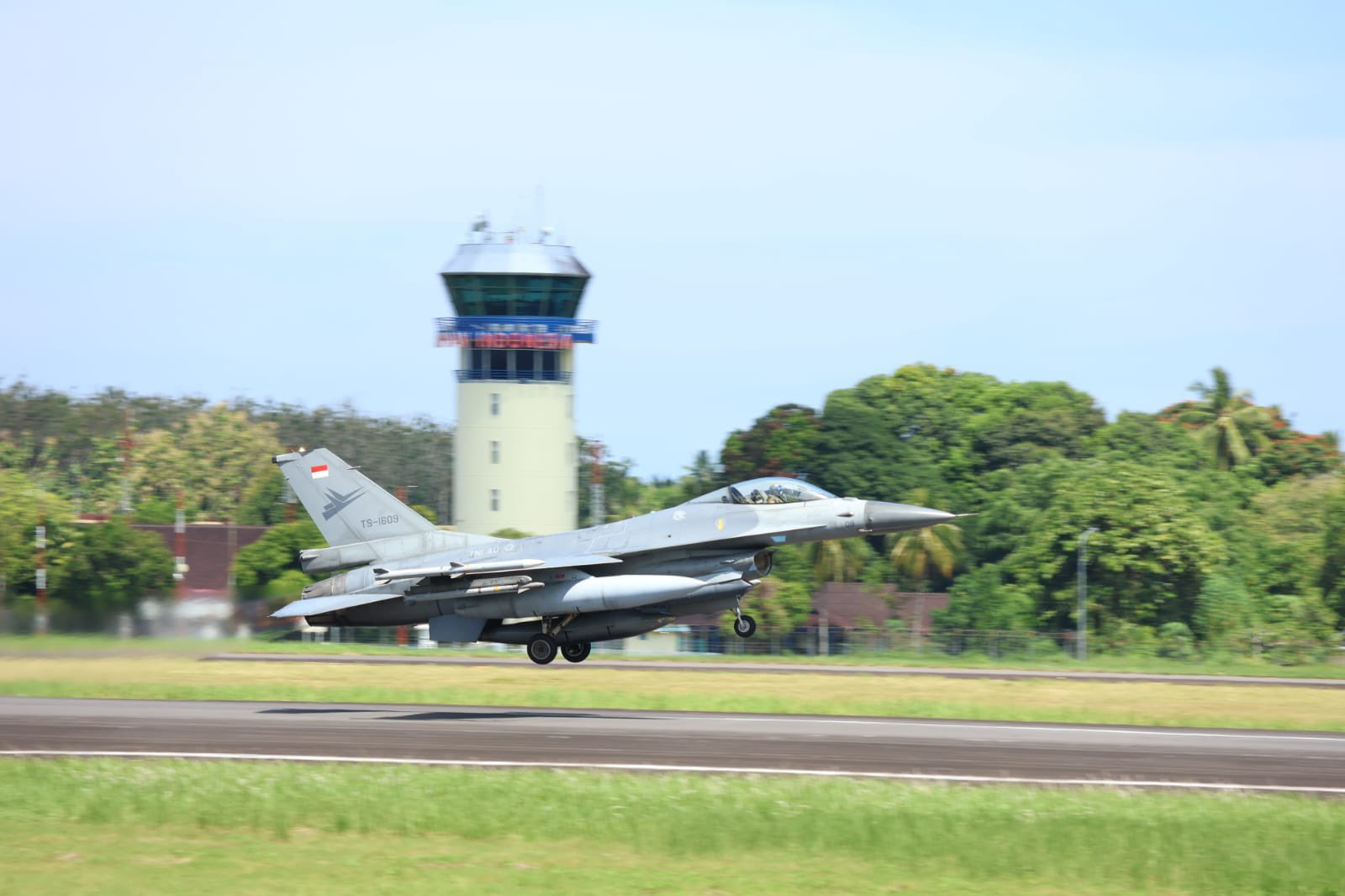
Indonesian Air Force F-16 takes off from Sam Ratulangi AFB

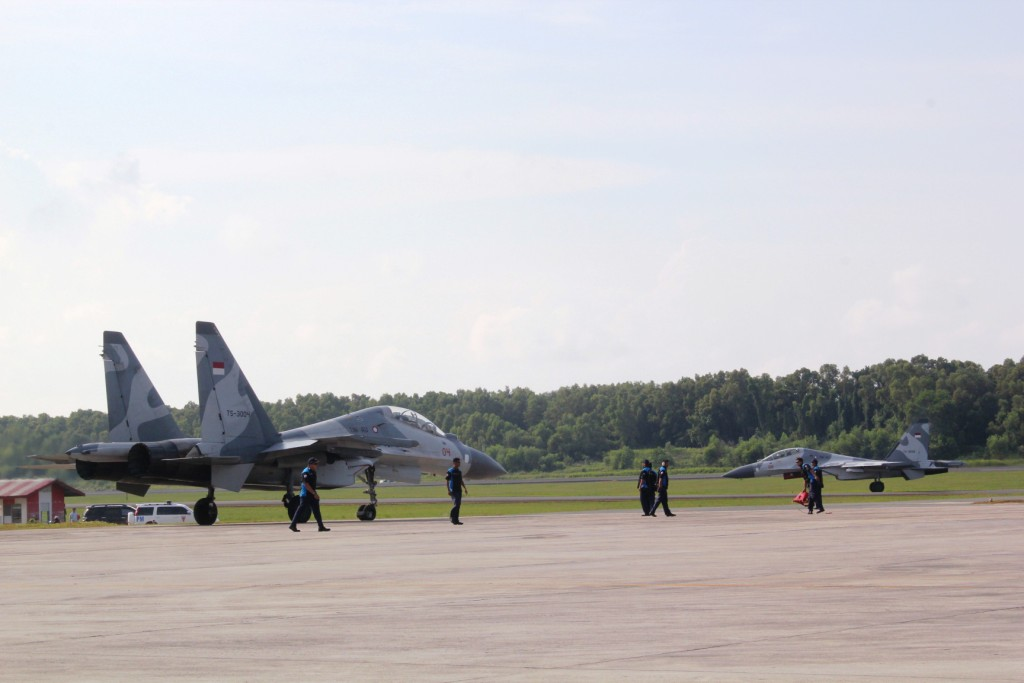
Indonesian Air Force Sukhoi Su-30 fighter at Sultan Aji Muhammad Sulaiman Sepinggan Airport

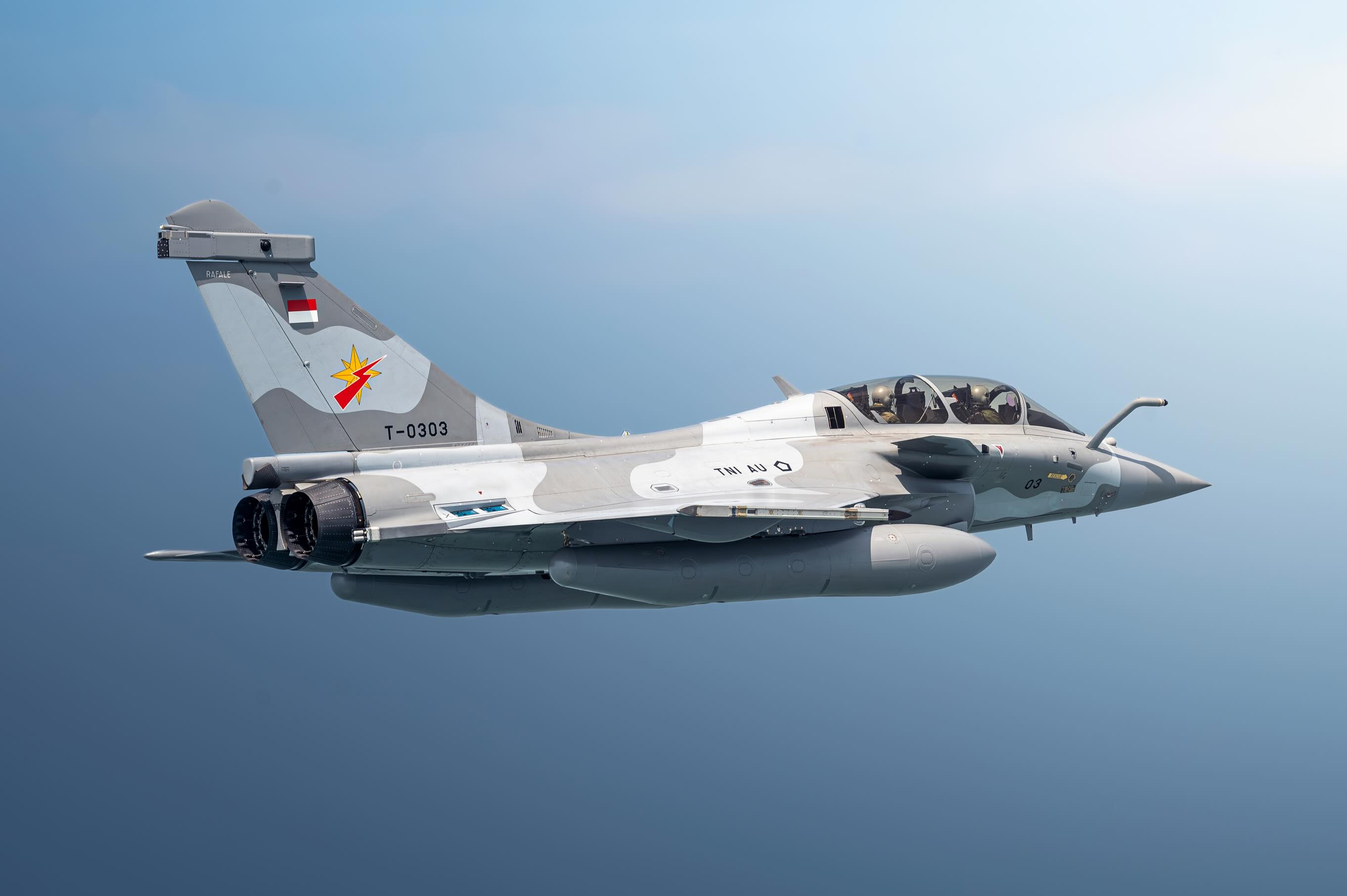
Indonesian Air Force Dassault Rafale

Indonesian Air Force fighter aircraft
- The TNI-AU (Indonesian Air Force) is headquartered in Jakarta, Indonesia. Its Order of Battle is under the Air Operations Commands (Koopsud) which consists of three operational commands (Koopsud I, Koopsud II, and Koopsud III). Most of its airbases are located on the island of Java. Presently, the Air Force has up-to 34,930 personnel equipped with 263 aircraft including Dassault Rafale, Sukhoi Su-27s, Su-30s, F-16 Fighting Falcons, Hawk 100/200s, KAI T-50 Golden Eagles, and EMB 314 Super Tucanos. The Air Force also has air force infantry corps which is known as Korpasgat that are tasked for airbase defence, airborne troops and special forces unit.

While no longer a part of the Armed Forces since 1 April 1999, the Indonesian National Police (POLRI) often operate in paramilitary roles independently or in co-operation with the other services on internal security missions, usually in cooperation with the Indonesian National Armed Forces (TNI). The National Police Mobile Brigade Corps are the main paramilitary forces which are usually put on to these roles and tasks with the service branches of the armed forces. Until today, both the TNI and the POLRI still holds strong ties and cooperation for the sake of the nation's national security and integrity purposes.

=== Special Forces Unit ===
Indonesian Military Special Forces

- TNI AD (Indonesian Army): Kopassus, Tontaipur
- TNI AL (Indonesian Navy): Kopaska, Taifib, Denjaka
- TNI AU (Indonesian Air Force): Bravo Detachment 90

In the immediate aftermath of 2018 Surabaya bombings, President Widodo has agreed to revive the TNI Joint Special Operations Command (Koopssusgab) to assist the National Police in antiterrorism operations under certain conditions. This joint force is composed of special forces of the National Armed Forces as mentioned above, and is under the direct control of the Commander of the National Armed Forces. In July 2019, President Widodo officially formed the Armed Forces Special Operations Command (Koopssus TNI) which comprised 400 personnel each from Sat-81 Gultor of Kopassus, Denjaka, and Den Bravo of Kopasgat to conduct special operations to protect national interests within or outside Indonesian territory.

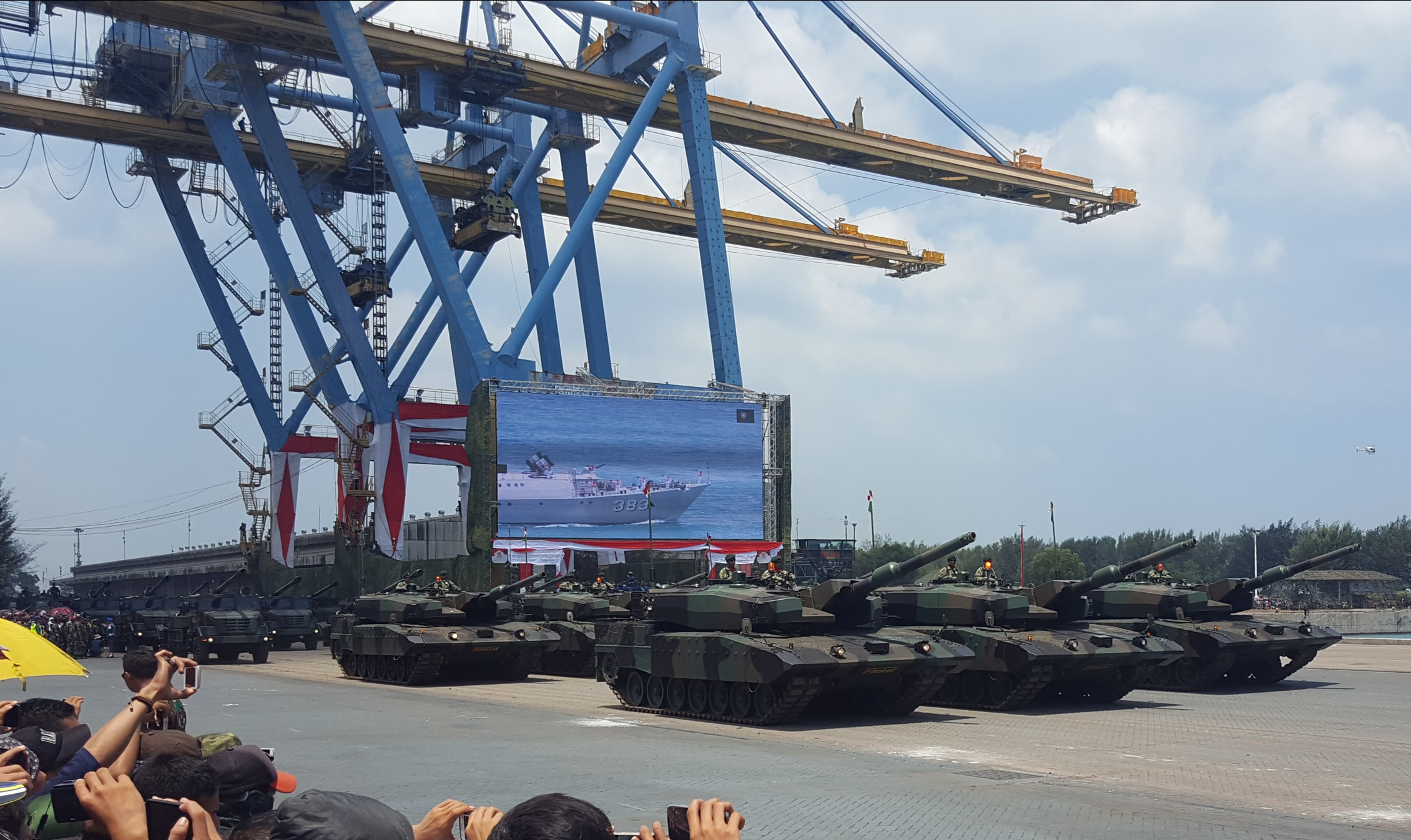
Equipment of the Indonesian National Armed Forces during a parade on Armed Force Anniversary Day in 2017

=== Equipment ===
- TNI AD List of equipment of the Indonesian Army
- TNI AL List of equipment of the Indonesian Navy
- TNI AU List of equipment of the Indonesian Air Force

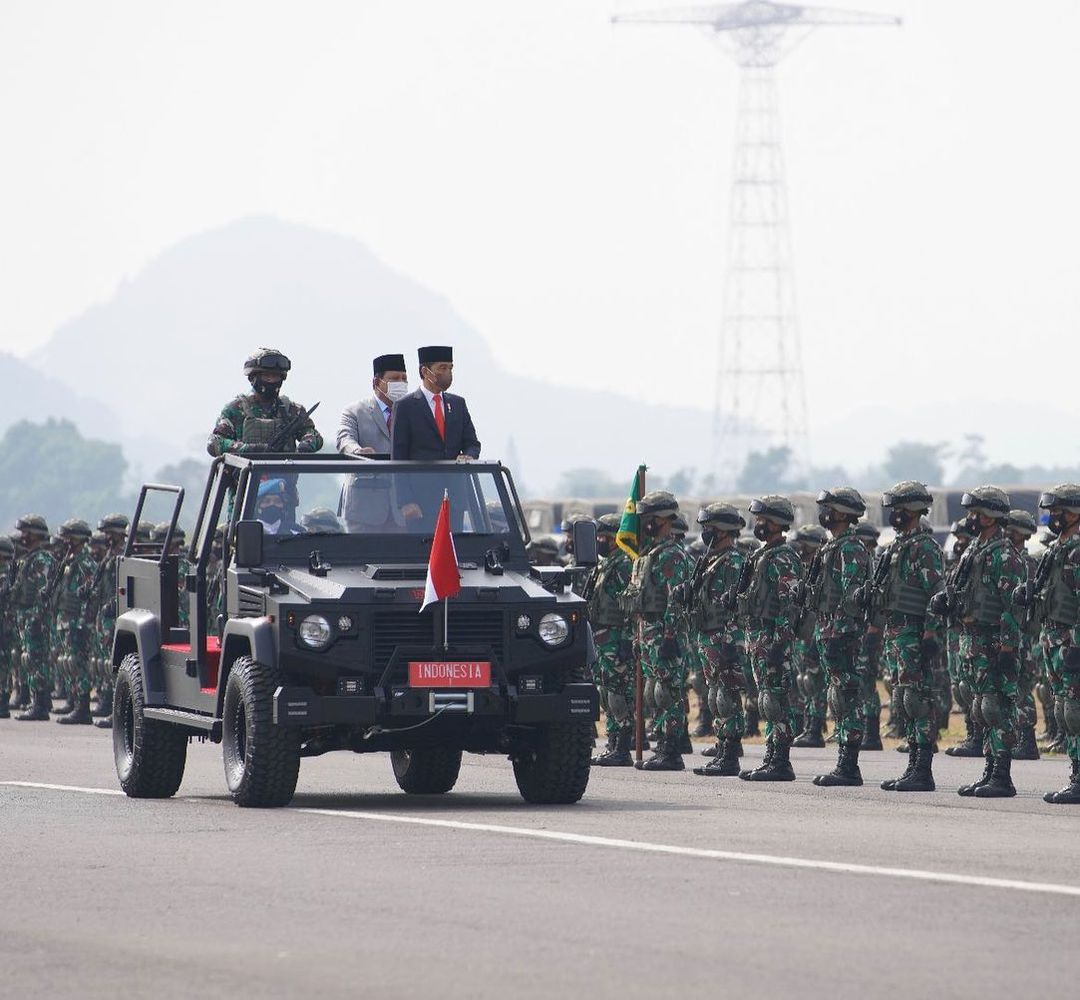
President Jokowi and Defense Minister Prabowo Subianto inaugurates reserve component (Komcad) in ILSV vehicle

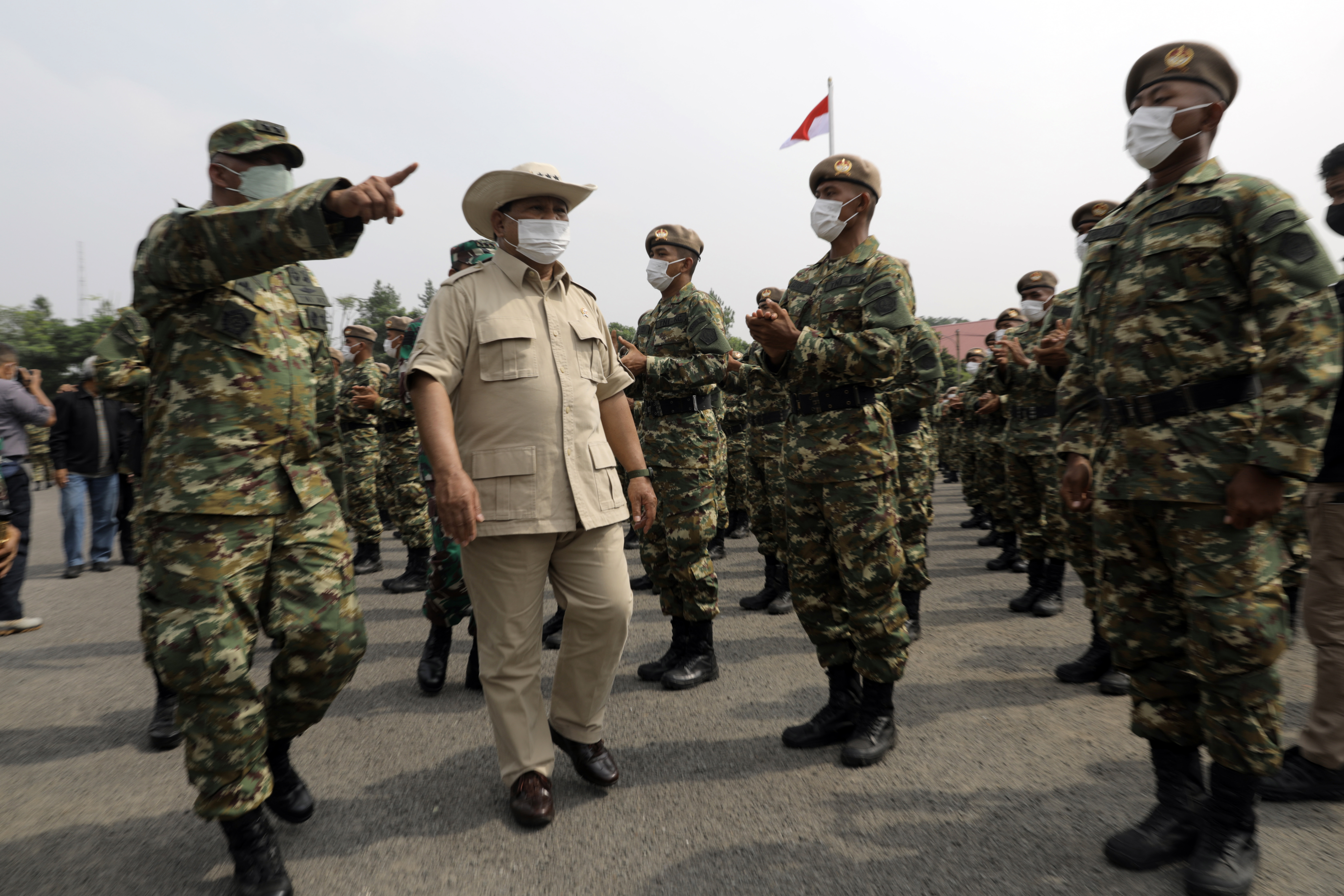
TNI Reserve Component with Kostrad camo pattern

=== Reserves ===
The Indonesian National Armed Forces Reserve Component (Komponen Cadangan TNI, abbreviated into KOMCAD) is the military reserve force element of the Indonesian National Armed Forces.

On January 12, 2021, President Joko Widodo, as Commander in Chief of the Armed Forces, issued Government Regulation Number 3 of 2021 implementing Law 23 on the Management of National Resources for Defense of the Nation which established the Reserve as a directly reporting unit under the General Headquarters, in order to supplement the Principal Component, i.e. the Armed Forces and the National Police.

Under the regulation, the Reserve officially consists of army, naval, and air reserve forces. Membership in the reserve is voluntary for all citizens, even for members of the civil service.

== Budget ==
Fiscal Year	Budget (IDR)	Budget (USD)
2005	Rp 21.97 trillion	US$2.5 billion
2006	Rp 23.6 trillion	US$2.6 billion
2007	Rp 32.6 trillion	US$3.4 billion
2008	Rp 36.39 trillion	US$3.8 billion
2009	Rp 33.6 trillion	US$3.3 billion
2010	Rp 42.3 trillion	US$4.47 billion
2011	Rp 47.5 trillion	US$5.2 billion
2012	Rp 64.4 trillion	US$7.5 billion
2013	Rp 81.8 trillion	US$8.44 billion
2014	Rp 83.4 trillion	US$7.91 billion
2015	Rp 95.5 trillion	US$8.05 billion
2016	Rp 99.5 trillion	US$7.3 billion
2017	Rp 109.3 trillion	US$8.17 billion
2018	Rp 108 trillion	US$8 billion
2019	Rp 121 trillion	US$9.1 billion
2020	Rp 131 trillion	US$9.35 billion
*2020 (Budget cuts)	Rp 122 trillion	US$8.67 billion
2021	Rp 134 trillion	US$9.2 billion
2022	Rp 151 trillion	US$10.1 billion
2023 (Originally)	Rp 123.44 trillion	US$8.54 billion
2023 (Proposed)	Rp 319 trillion	US$22 billion
2023 (Planned)	Rp 134.33 trillion	US$8.83 billion
2024	Rp 139 trillion	US$9.27 billion
2025	Rp 155.98 trillion	US$9.75 billion
2026	Rp 335,2 trillion	-

*the 2020 budget was changed due to COVID-19 outbreak, while the budget for the Ministry of Health, and Ministry of Education and Culture has been increased.

== Uniforms ==
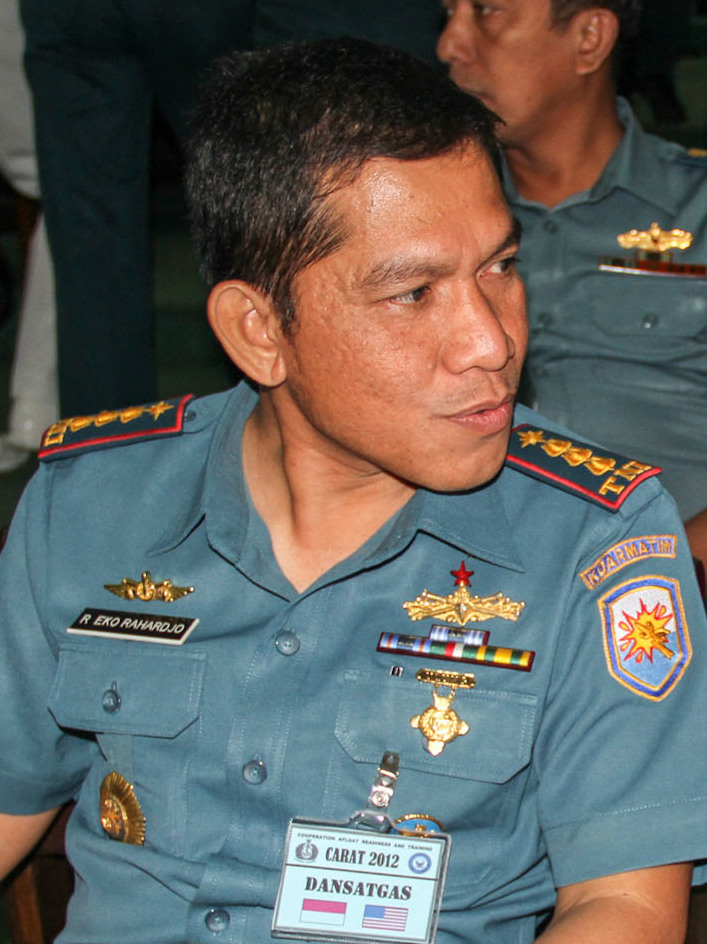
Indonesian navy officer (colonel from the sailor corps) dressed in service uniform (PDH)

The Indonesian National Armed Forces have three types of uniforms worn by its personnel, which are general service uniforms, specialised service uniforms and branch-specific uniforms.

General service uniforms have three subtypes of uniform, which are dress uniform (Pakaian Dinas Upacara/PDU), service uniform (Pakaian Dinas Harian/PDH) and field uniform (Pakaian Dinas Lapangan/PDL). Each uniform subtypes also consists of several categories, which are:

Dress uniform (PDU)	Service uniform (PDH)	Field uniform (PDL)
PDU I – (Service medals and brevets attached)	PDH I – (with military beret or side cap)	PDL I
PDU IA – (Order decorations attached and honorary sash worn over for those who are entitled to wear it)	PDH II – (with cap)	PDL II
PDU II – (Mess dress uniform)	PDH III – (with blue beret)	PDL IIA
PDU IIA – (Mess dress uniform with order decorations attached)		PDL III
PDU III – (Service ribbons attached)		PDL IV
PDU IV – (Short sleeved, with no necktie worn)		

Each branches of the national armed forces have different color in their general service uniforms.

- Dress uniform (Pakaian Dinas Upacara/PDU)
  - Army: Dark green coat, Dark green trousers
  - Navy: White suit.
  - Air Force: Dark blue coat, Dark blue trousers.
- Service uniform (Pakaian Dinas Harian/PDH)
  - Army: green shirt, with dark green trousers
  - Navy: greyish blue shirt, with dark greyish trousers. For international event/duty, the navy personnel will wear white shirt with white trousers.
  - Air Force: light blue shirt, dark blue trousers
- Field uniform (Pakaian Dinas Lapangan/PDL)
  - All branches: Sage Green Digital, officially called "PDL TNI Prima", gradually replacing the standard issue DPM camouflage, sometimes called as "Loreng Malvinas".

Specialised service uniform consists of:

1. Pregnant-women service uniform (PDSH)
2. Standard-bearer service uniform (Gampokbang)
3. Military parade service uniform (PDP)
4. State visit service uniform (Gamprot)
5. Provost service uniform (Gamprov)
6. Military police service uniform (Gam Pom)
7. Military band service uniform (Gamsik)
8. Presidential security force service uniform (Gam Paspampres)
9. Desert field uniform

Branch-specific uniforms consists of:

Army	Navy	Air Force
"Indocam" field uniform	"Sailing" field uniform	Swa Bhuwana Paksa field uniform
NKRI field uniform	Marines field uniform	Air crew uniform (includes flight suit, pilot uniform and flight attendant uniform)
Kostrad field uniform	Kopaska field uniform	Kopasgat field uniform
Raider field uniform	Service dress white uniform	
Kopassus field uniform	Service dress black uniform	

On 2 March 2022, the Army unveiled its field uniform with new camo pattern, called as "Loreng Angkatan Darat" (Army camo pattern), that is specific only to the Army. This camo is a variant of MultiCam based on US Army OCP with local DPM color palette. A Desert/Arid variant intended to replace the older local Desert DPM Variant are also Present.

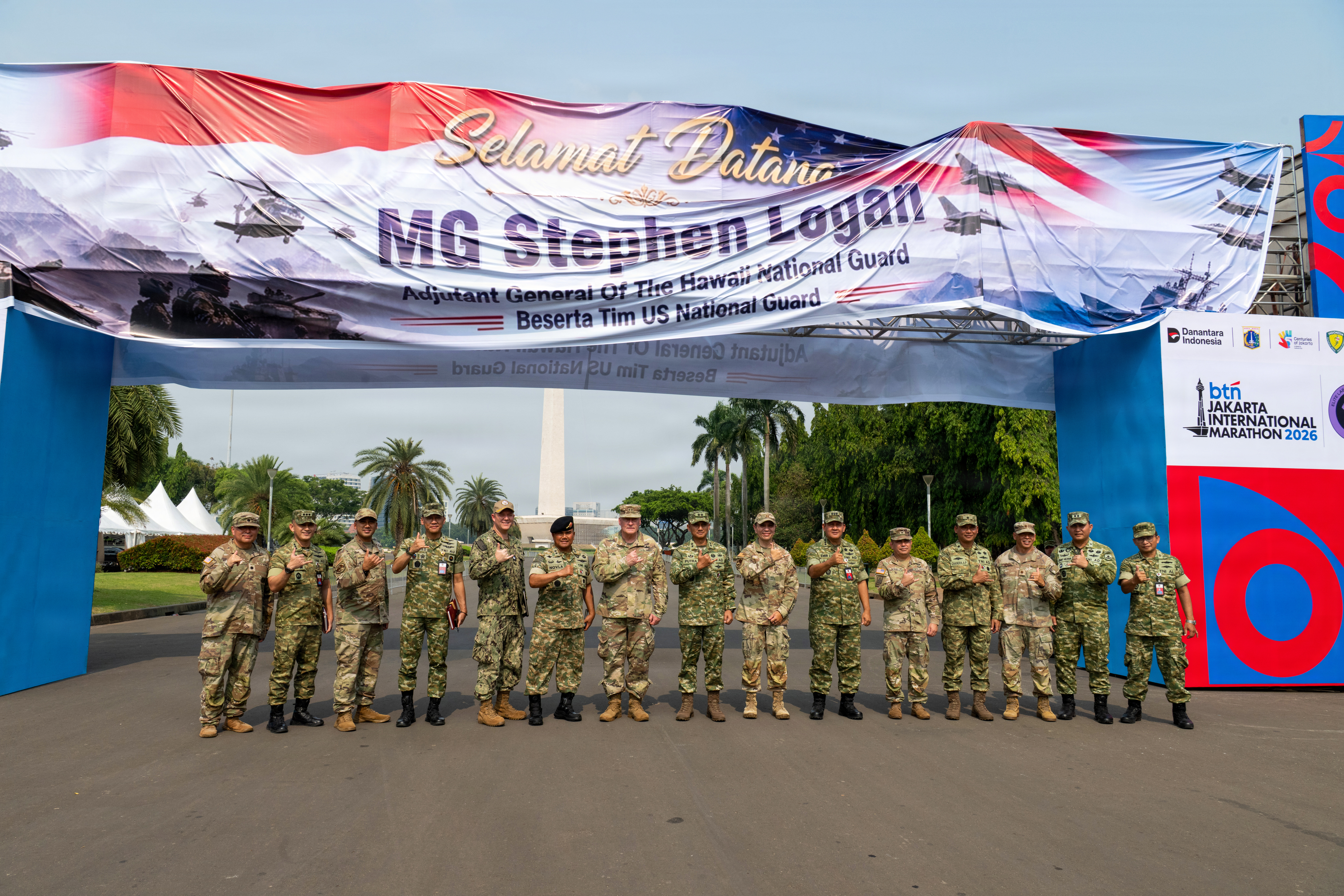
Several high-ranking officials from the Indonesian National Armed Forces Headquarters were seen wearing the latest field service uniforms.

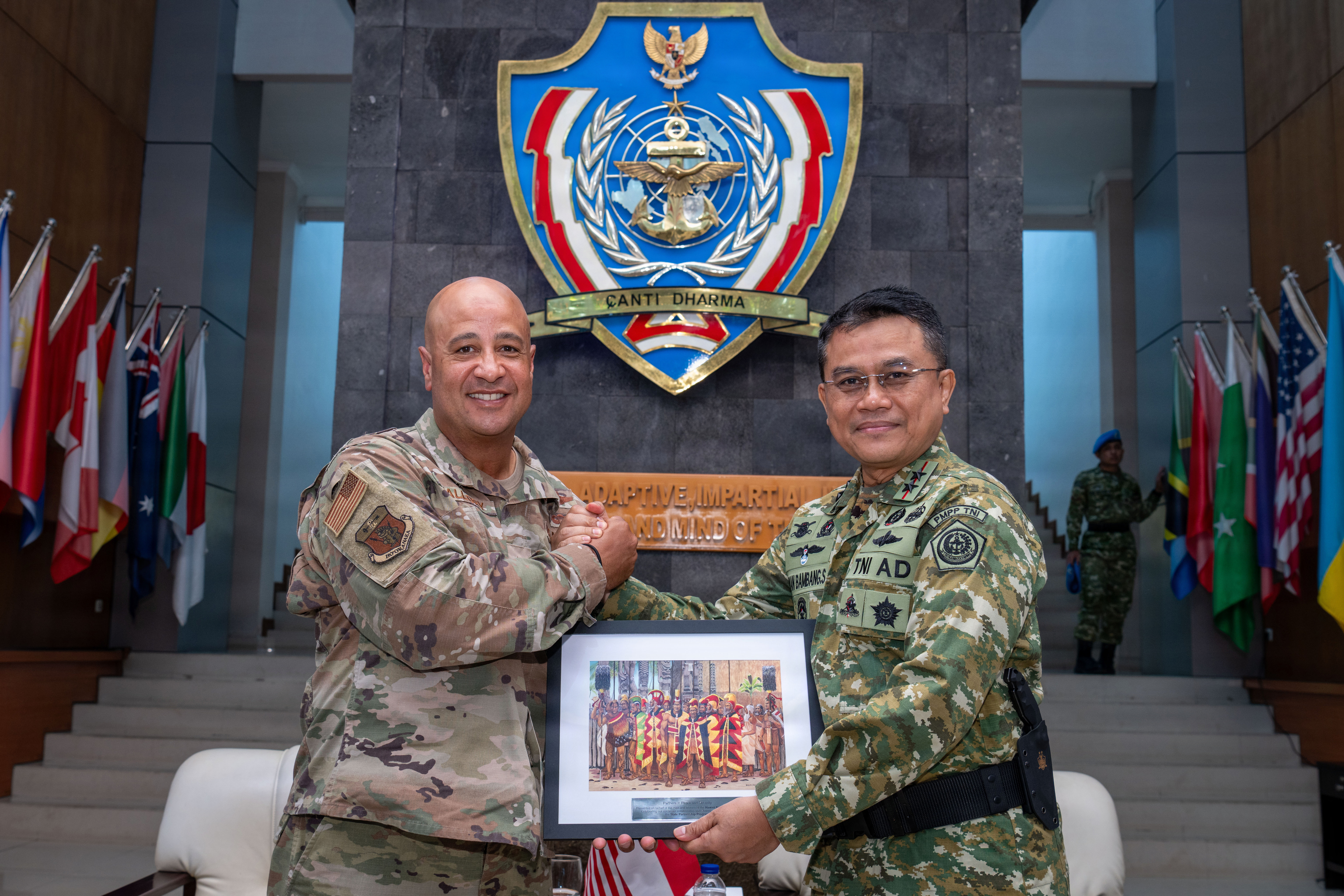
TNI PRIMA Camouflage compared to the U.S OCP

On 3 October 2025, the Indonesian National Armed Forces introduced a new field uniform featuring a digital camouflage pattern, officially replacing the DPM camouflage that had been in use since 1982. The new pattern is planned to be adopted simultaneously on 5 October 2025, coinciding with the celebration of the National Armed Forces' 80th anniversary. Although the new camouflage design resembles a pattern previously developed for the Airborne Command (Loreng Linud), it has a distinctive coloration that can be detected, at least upon close examination. Originally known as "PDL TNI Motif Baru" or "Sage Green" or "Sage Green Digital" the name was later changed to PDL TNI Prima on 21 January 2026.

Army Uniforms
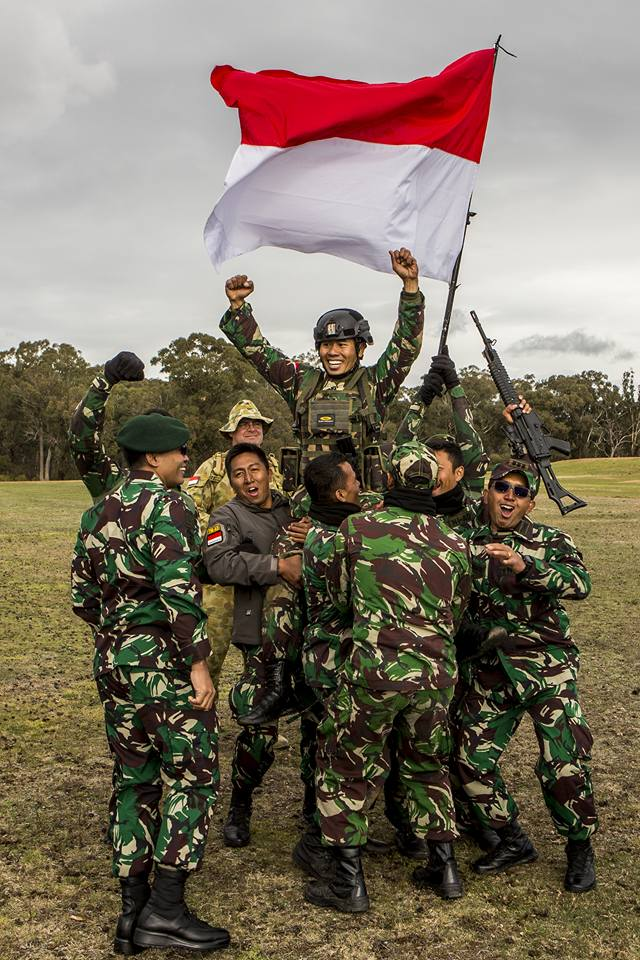
Indonesian Army soldiers with DPM camo during AASAM 2018

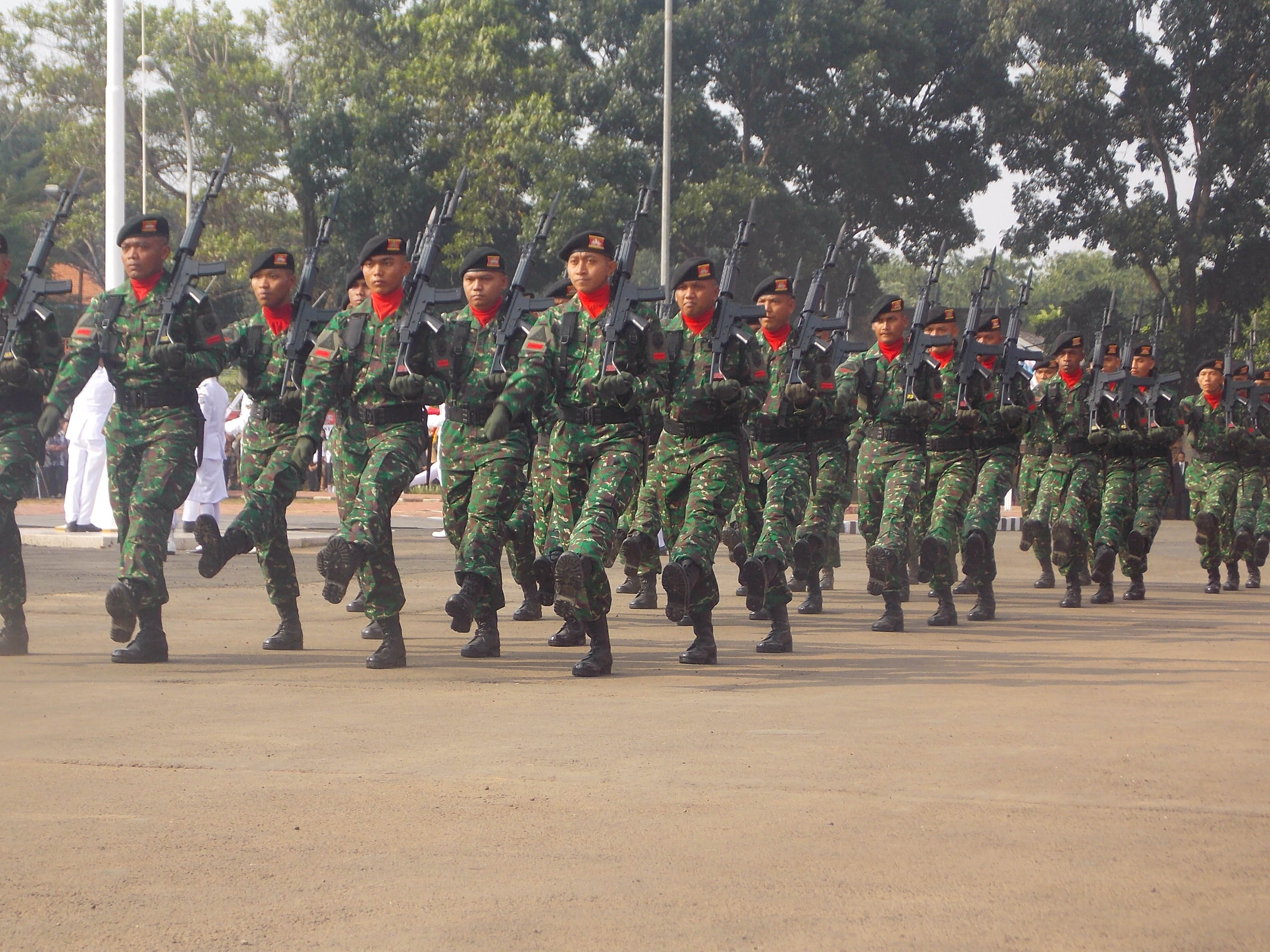
Indonesian Army cavalry soldiers with the NKRI camo pattern

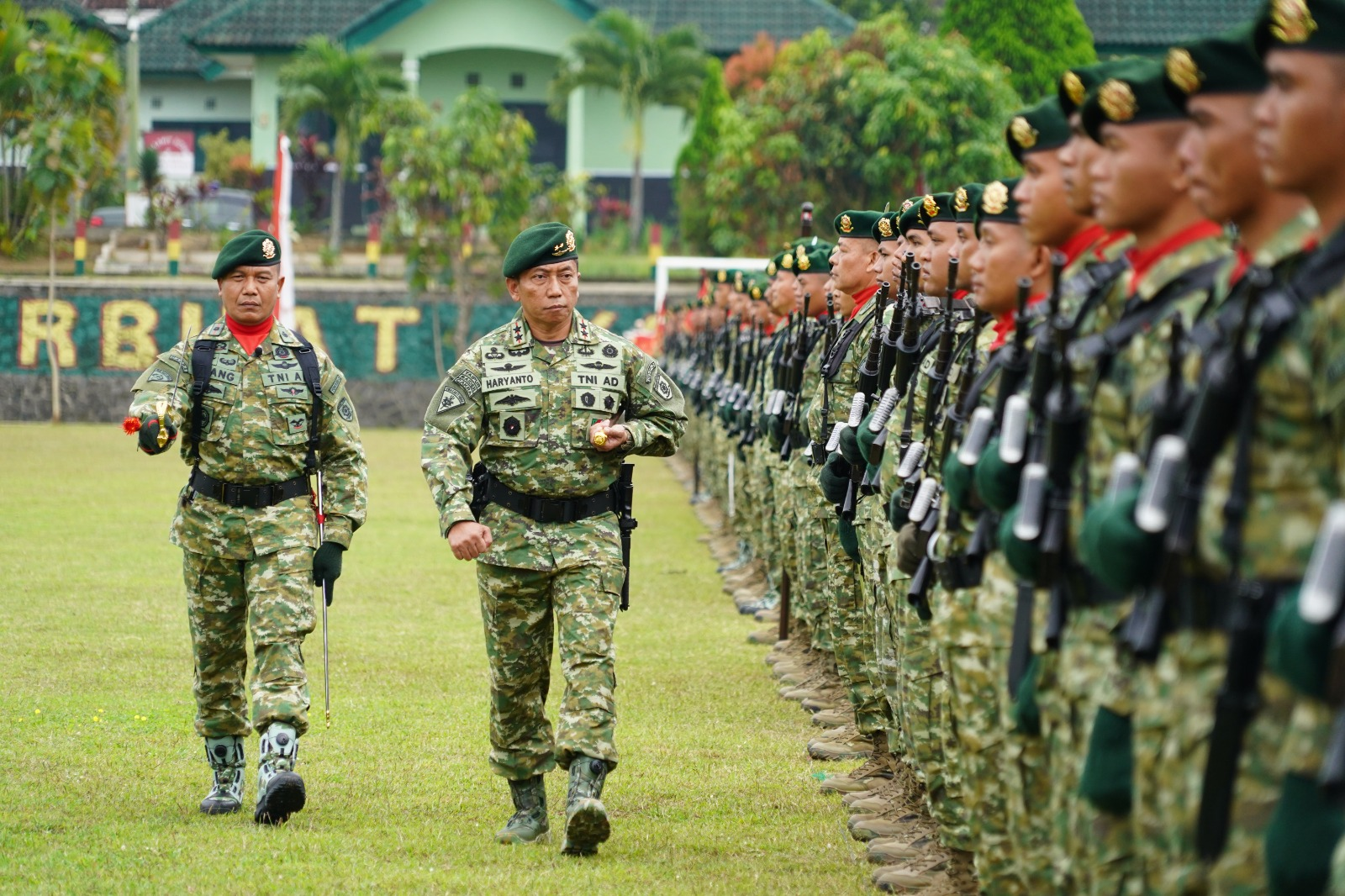
Kostrad soldiers with their camo pattern

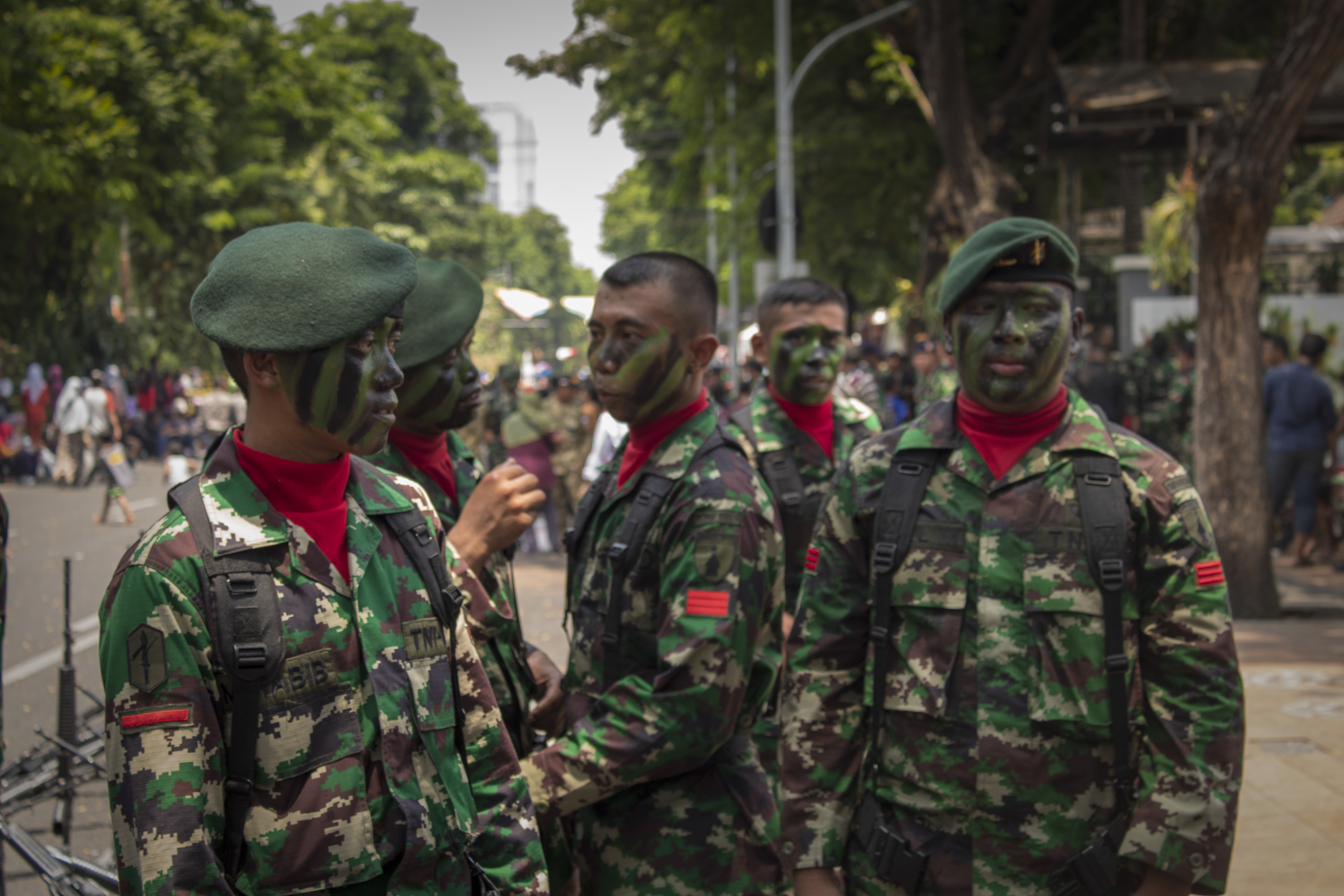
Indonesian Army raider infantry seen with their camo pattern

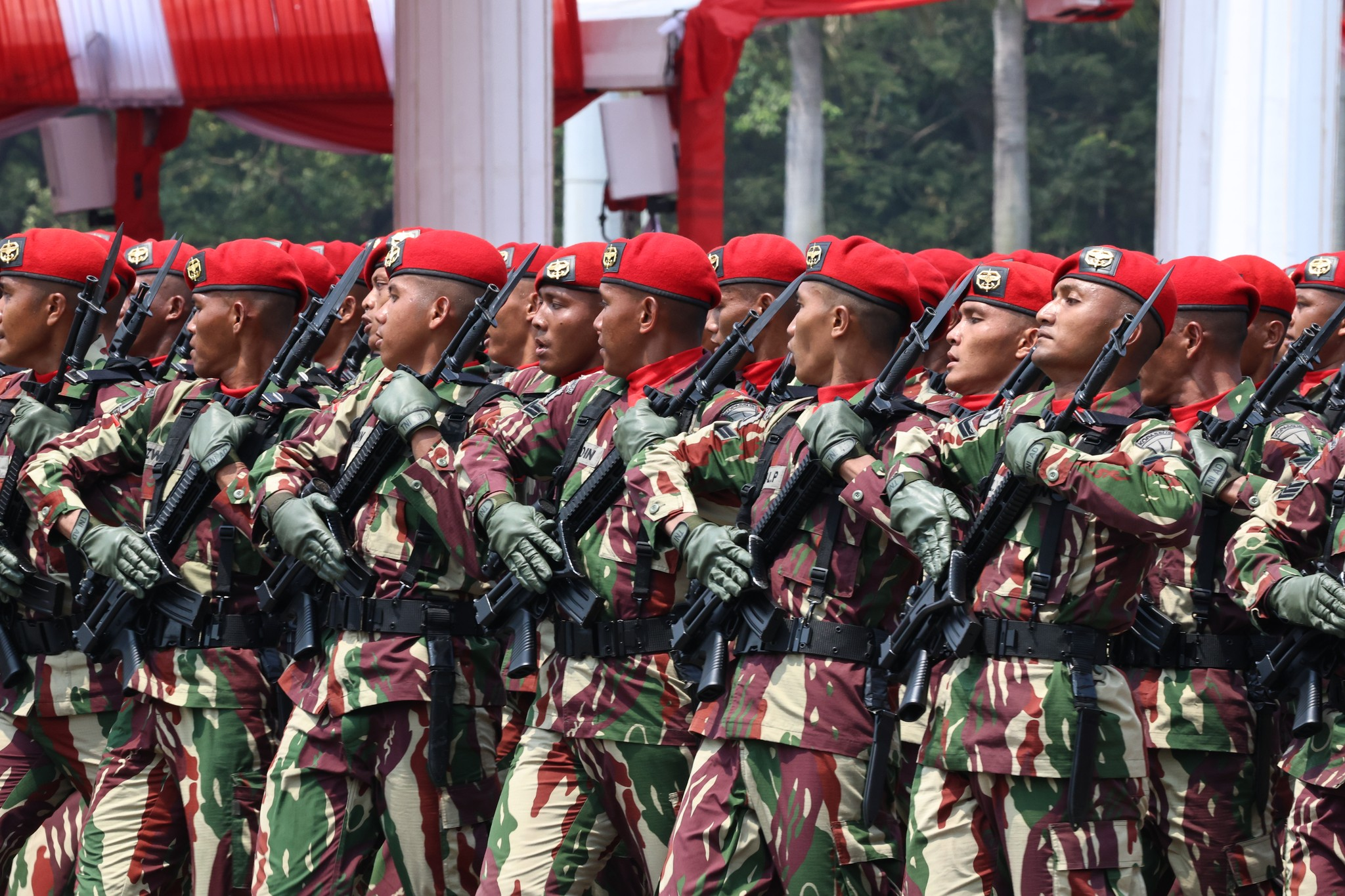
Indonesian Army Kopassus soldiers with their Darah Mengalir camo

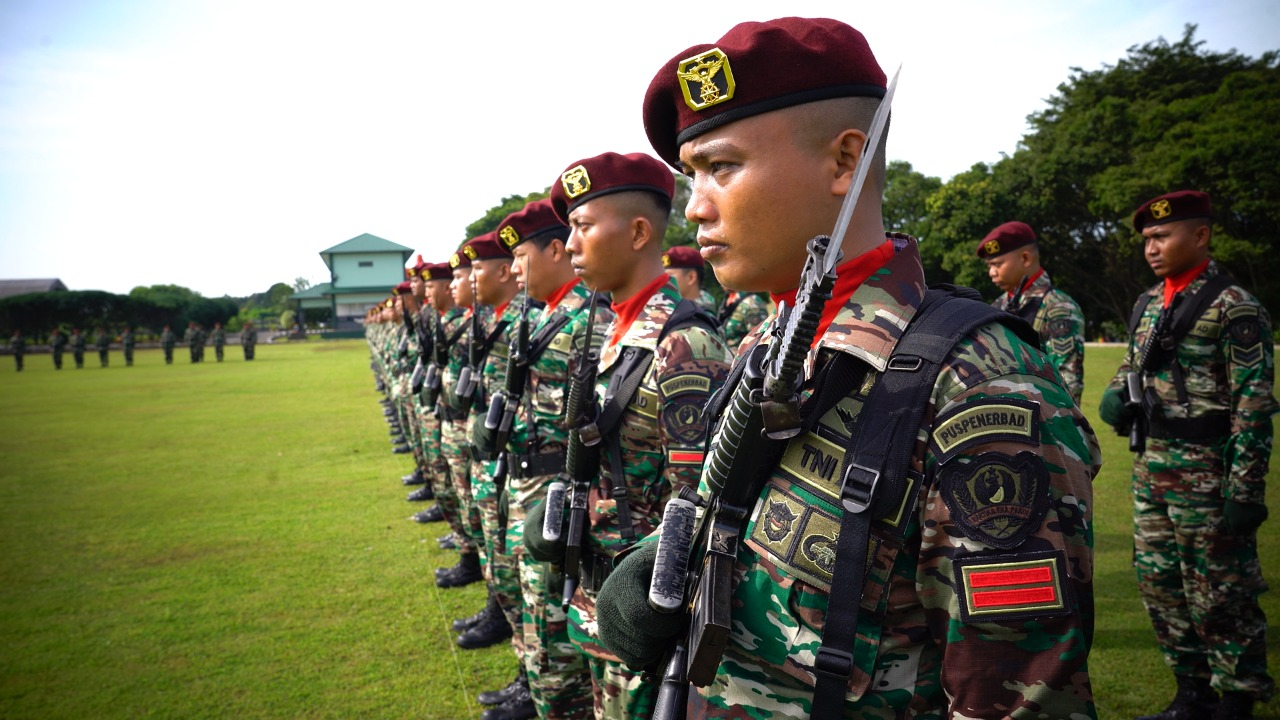
Army Aviation Center personnel wearing the Indonesian MultiCam

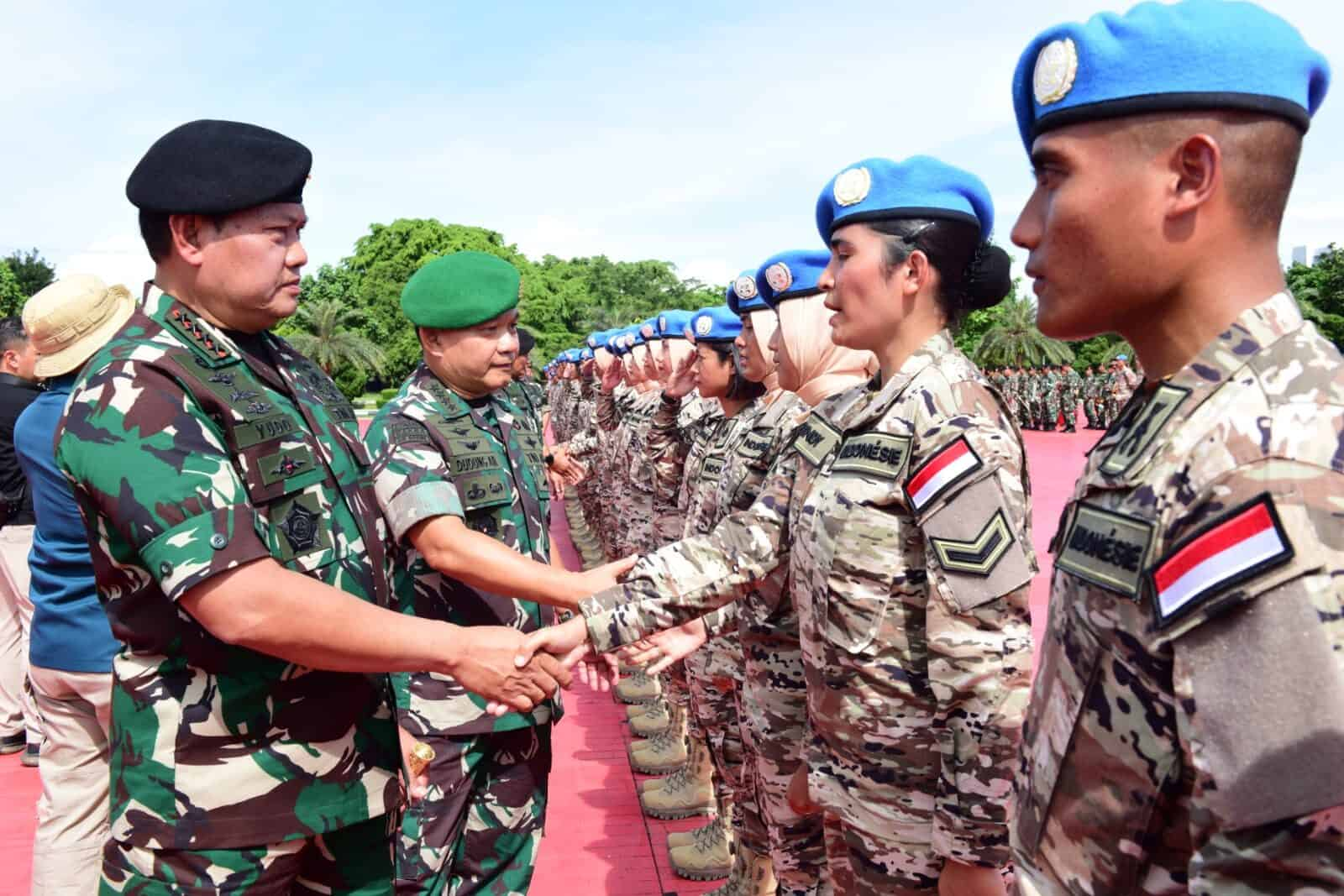
Garuda Contingent for MONUSCO wearing the Desert Camo/Loreng Gurun variant of the Indonesian MultiCam

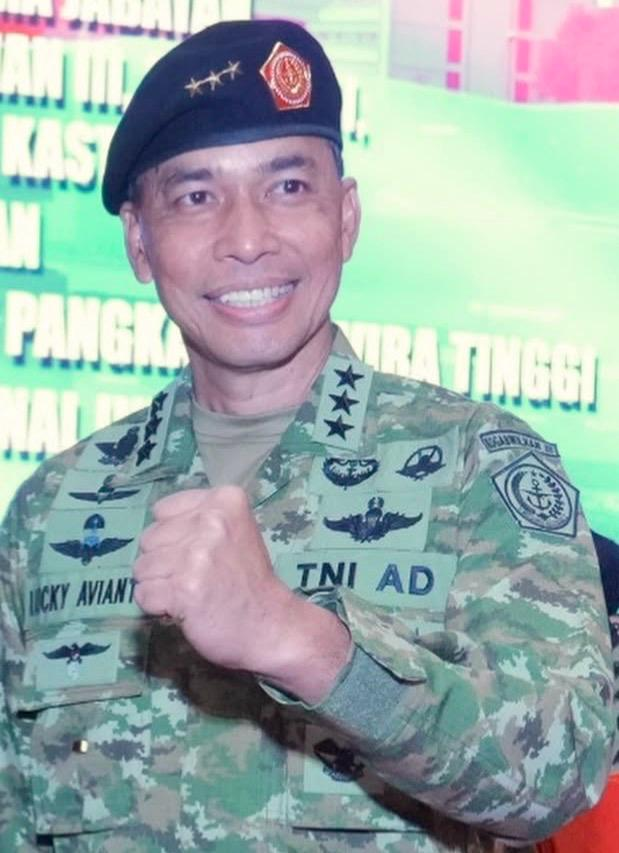
Lieutenant General Lucky Avianto oufitted with TNI PRIMA camouflage.
Navy Uniforms
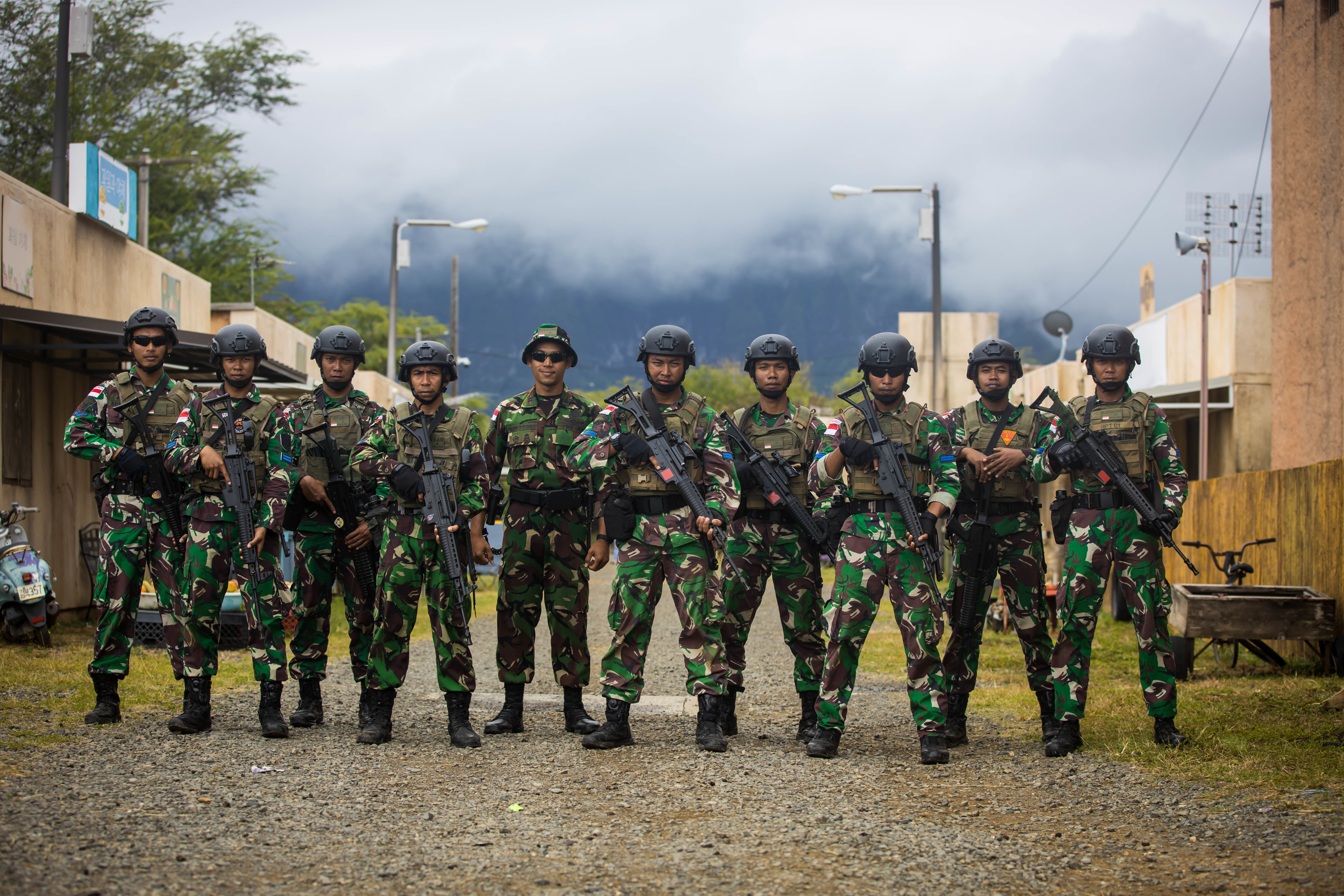
Indonesian Marine Corps with the DPM uniform

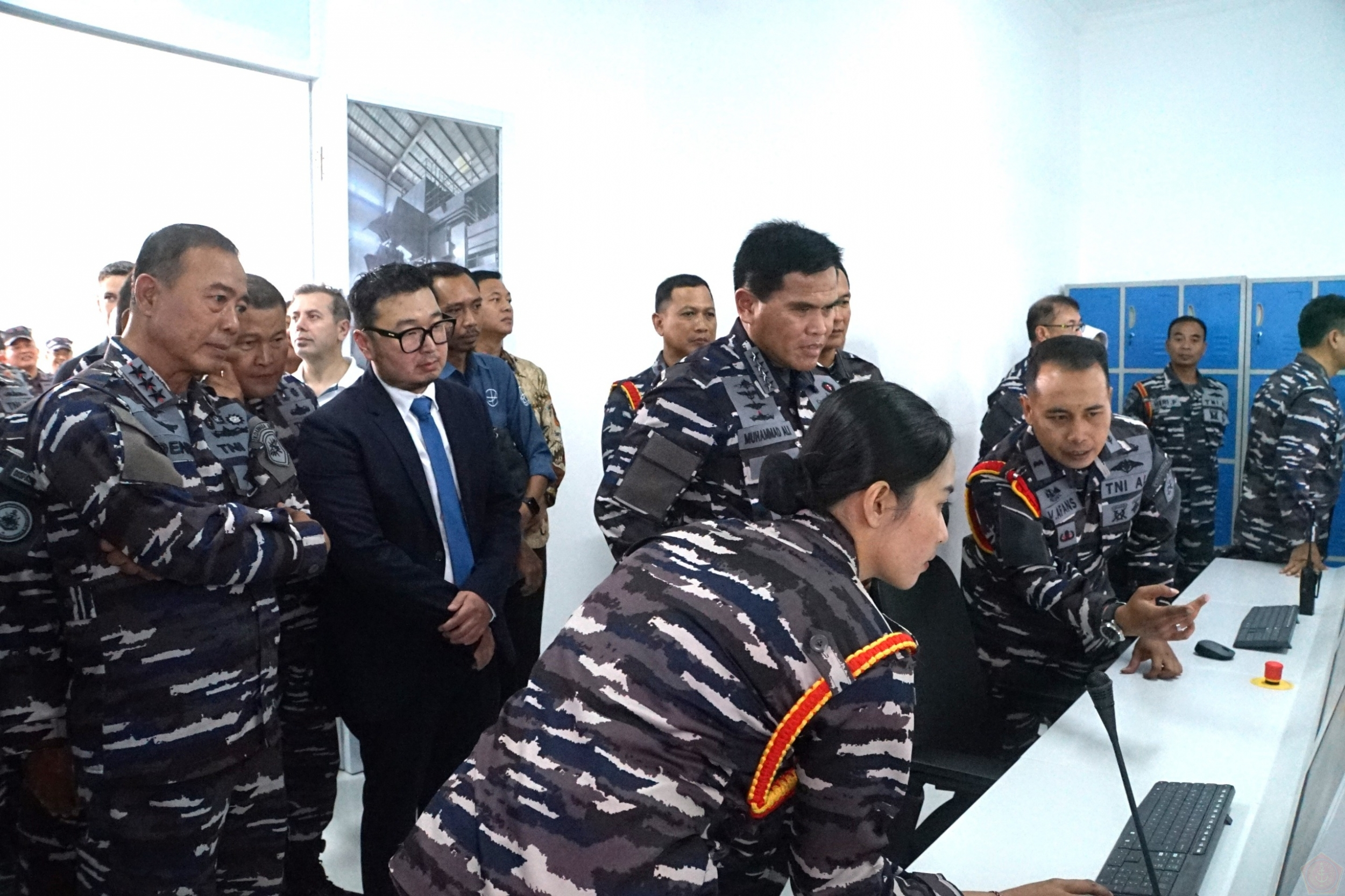
Indonesian Navy Loreng Layar or Sailing Camo

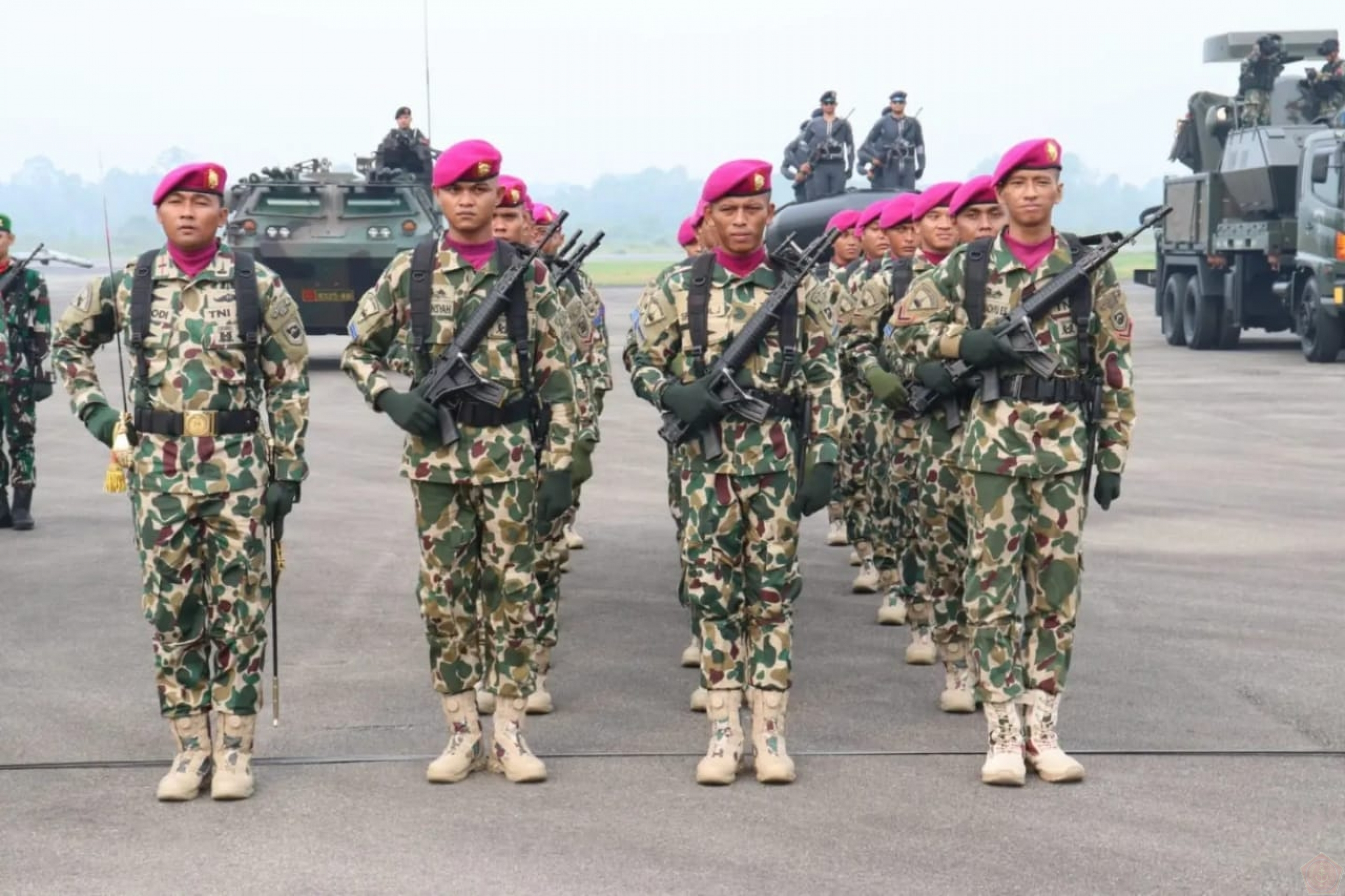
Marine Corps with their distinct uniform

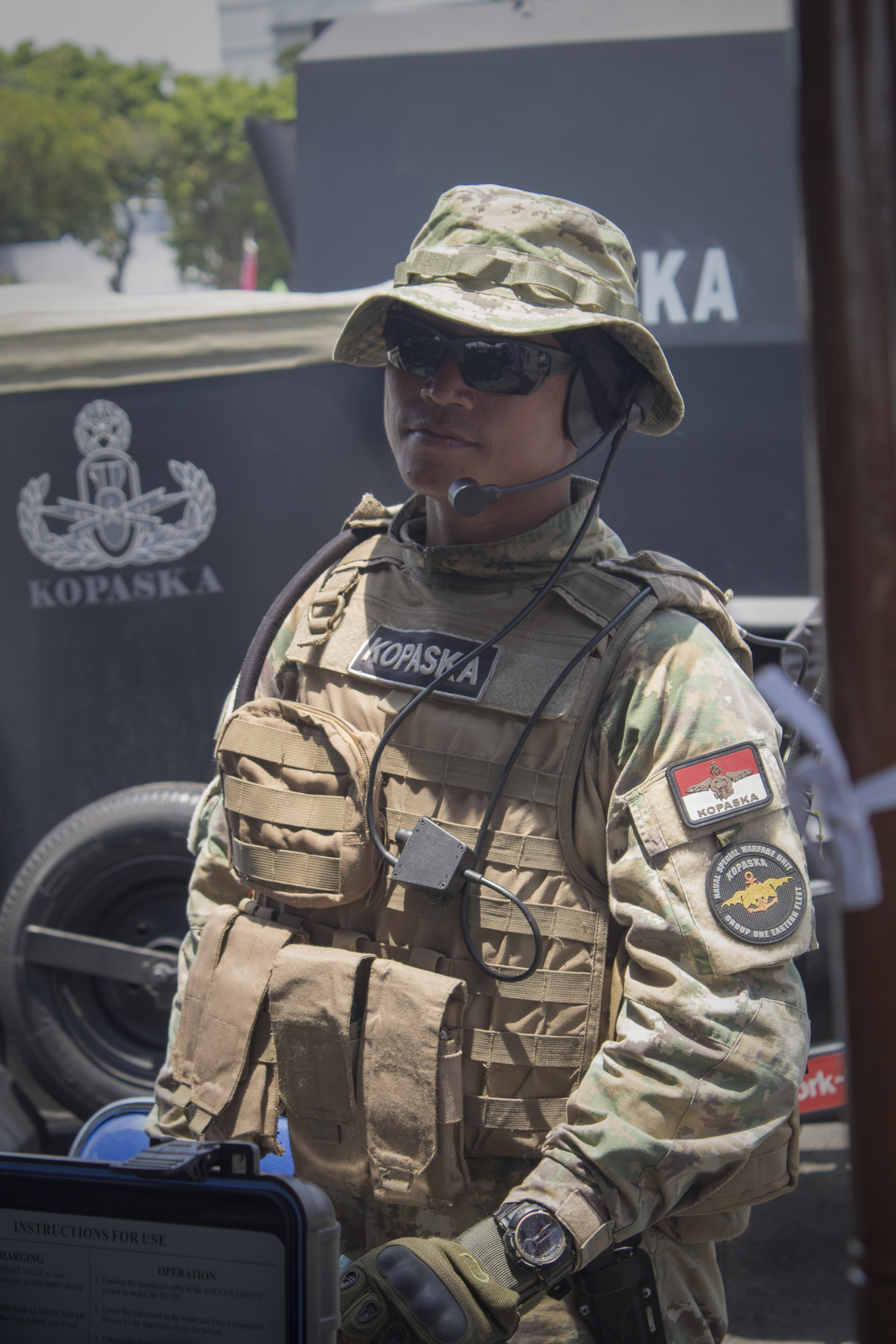
Kopaska operator with a distinct camo pattern

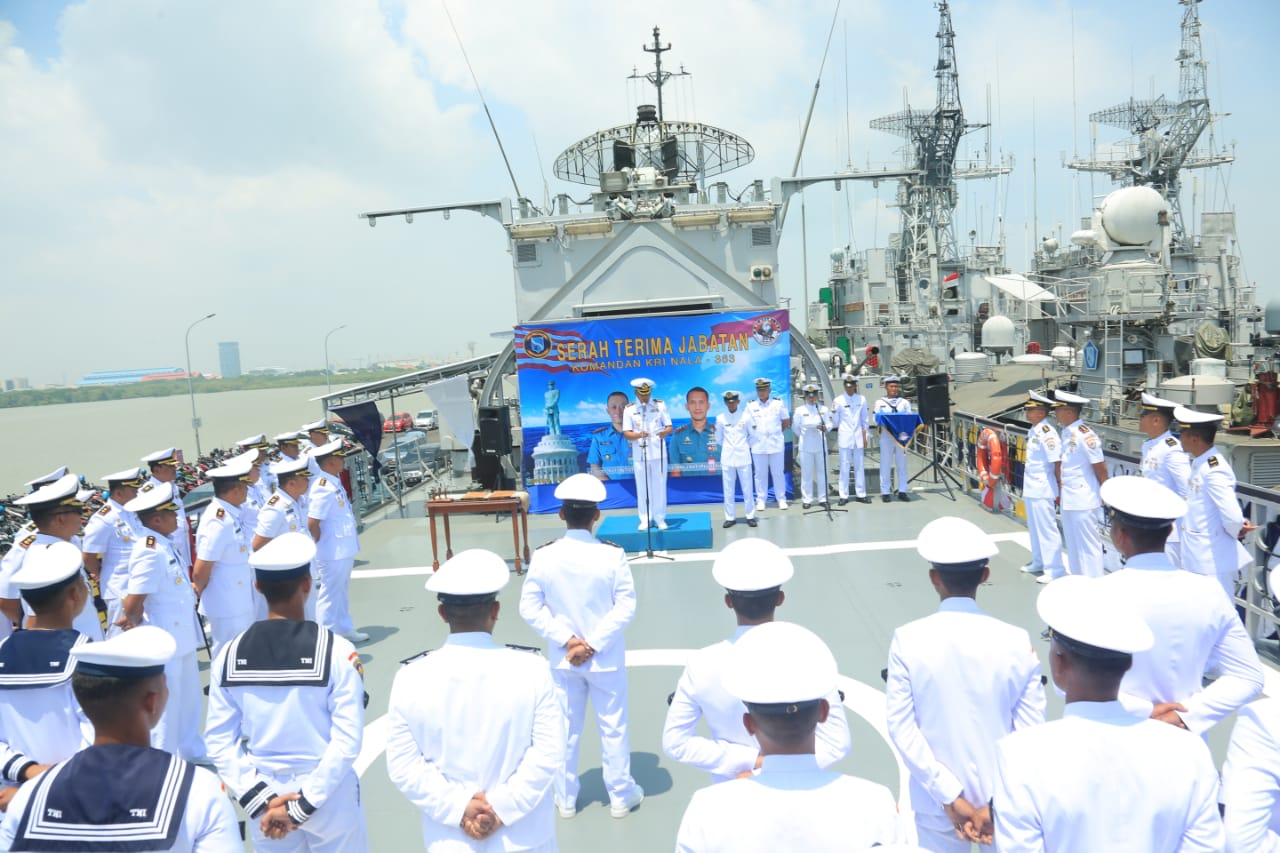
Indonesian Navy sailors on board KRI Nala (363)

Marine Corps operator with latest pixelated camo pattern called "TNI PRIMA"

Indonesian Navy with the latest pixelated camo pattern called "TNI PRIMA"
Air Force Uniforms
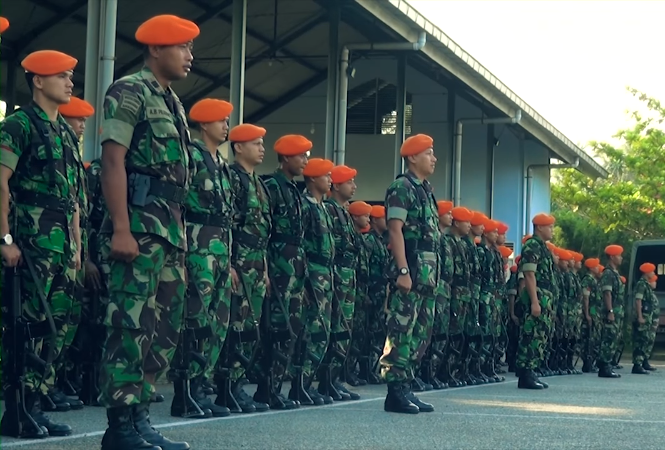
Indonesian Air Force Korpasgat members with the DPM pattern

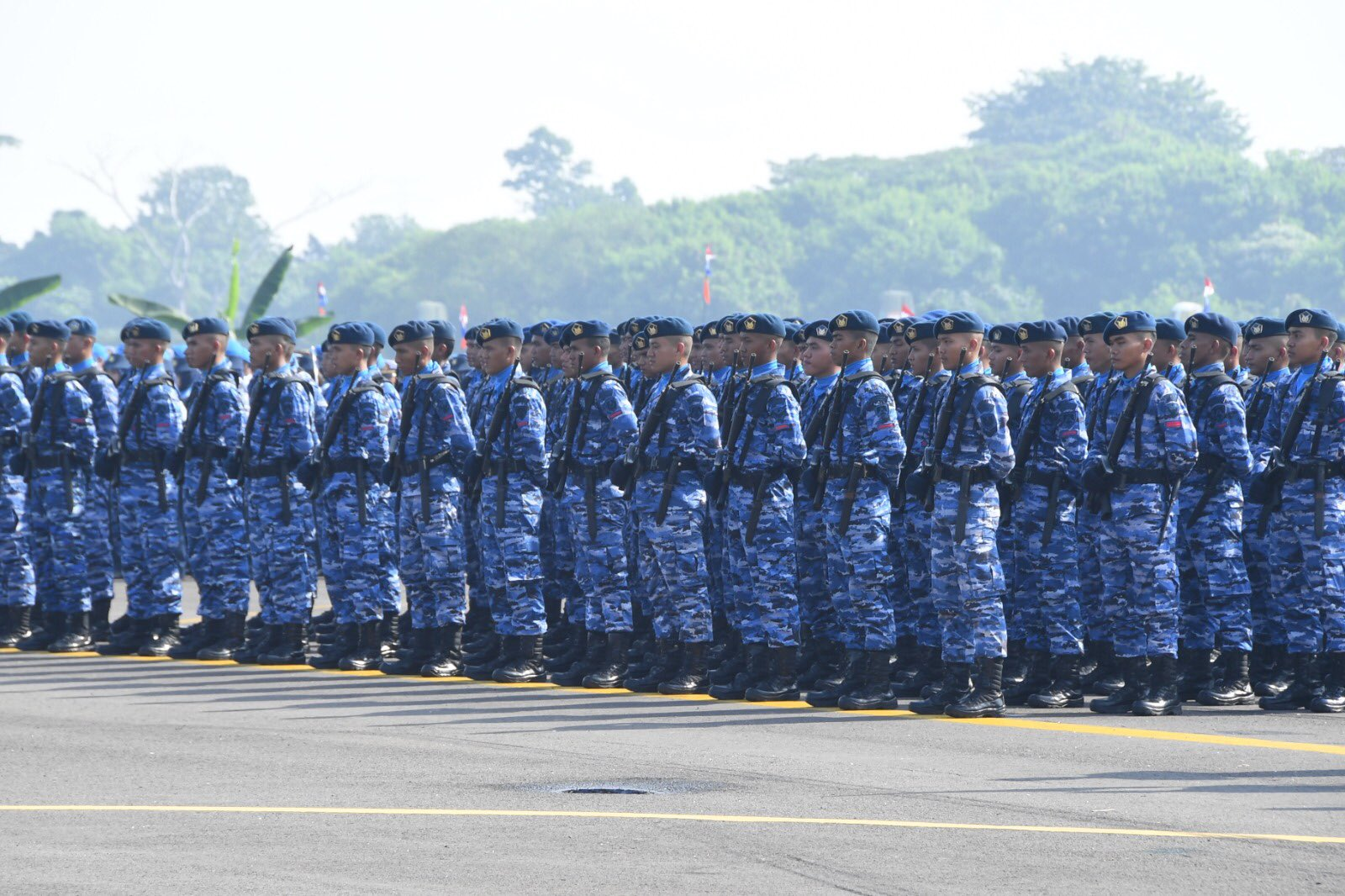
Indonesian Air Force HQ personnel with the Swa Bhuwana Paksa uniform

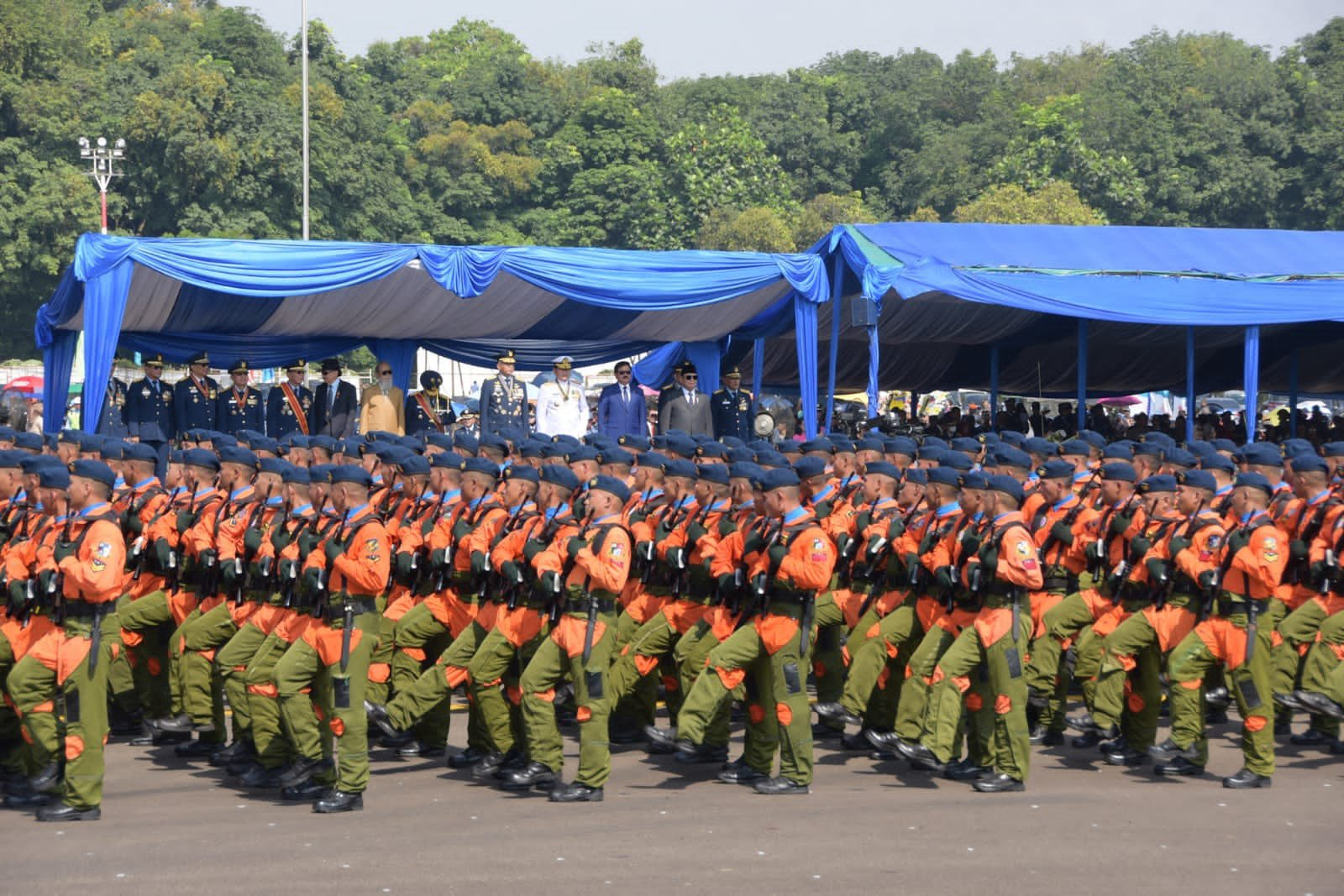
Air crews of the Indonesian Air Force

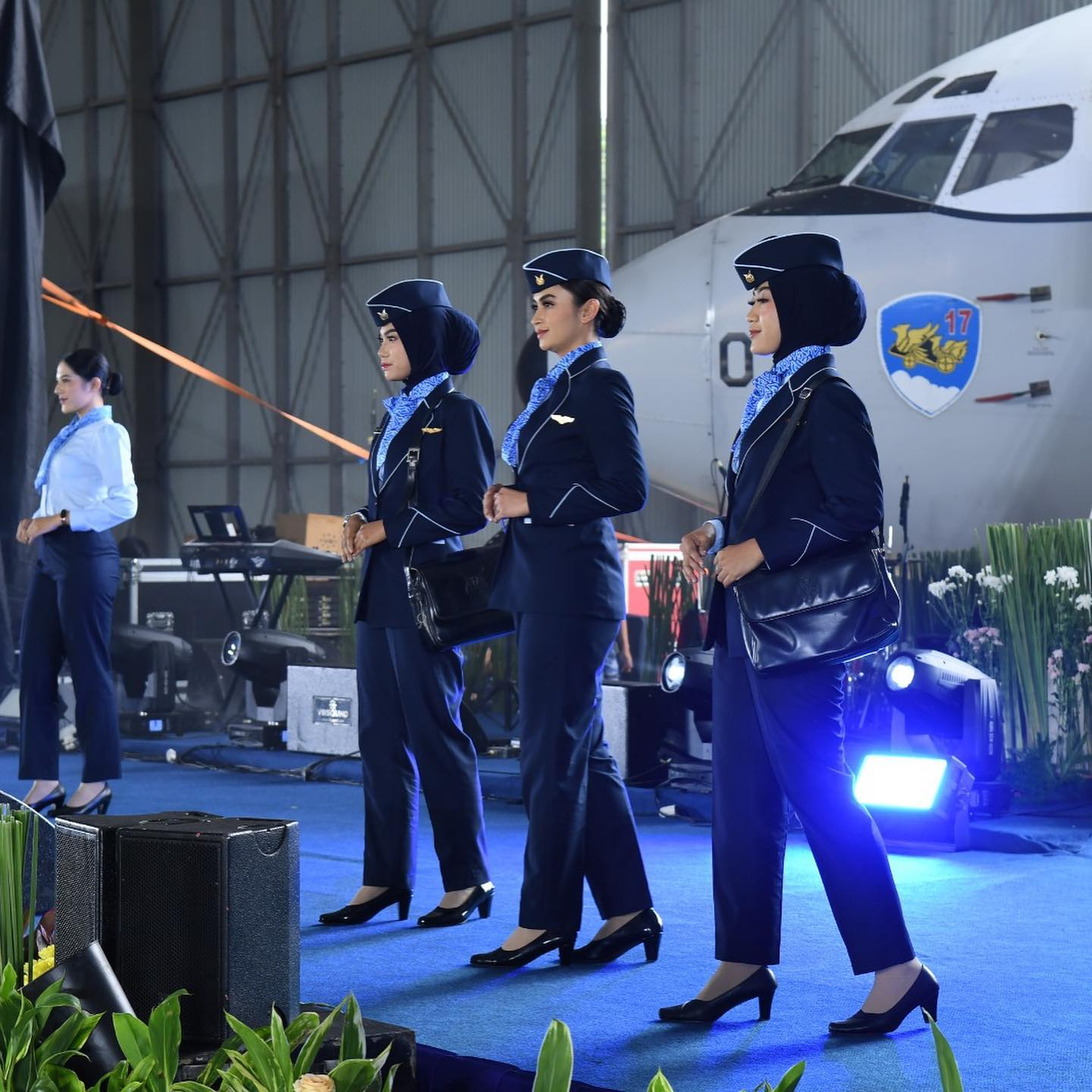
Indonesian Air Force flight attendants uniform seen with the 17th Air Squadron, 1st Air Wing

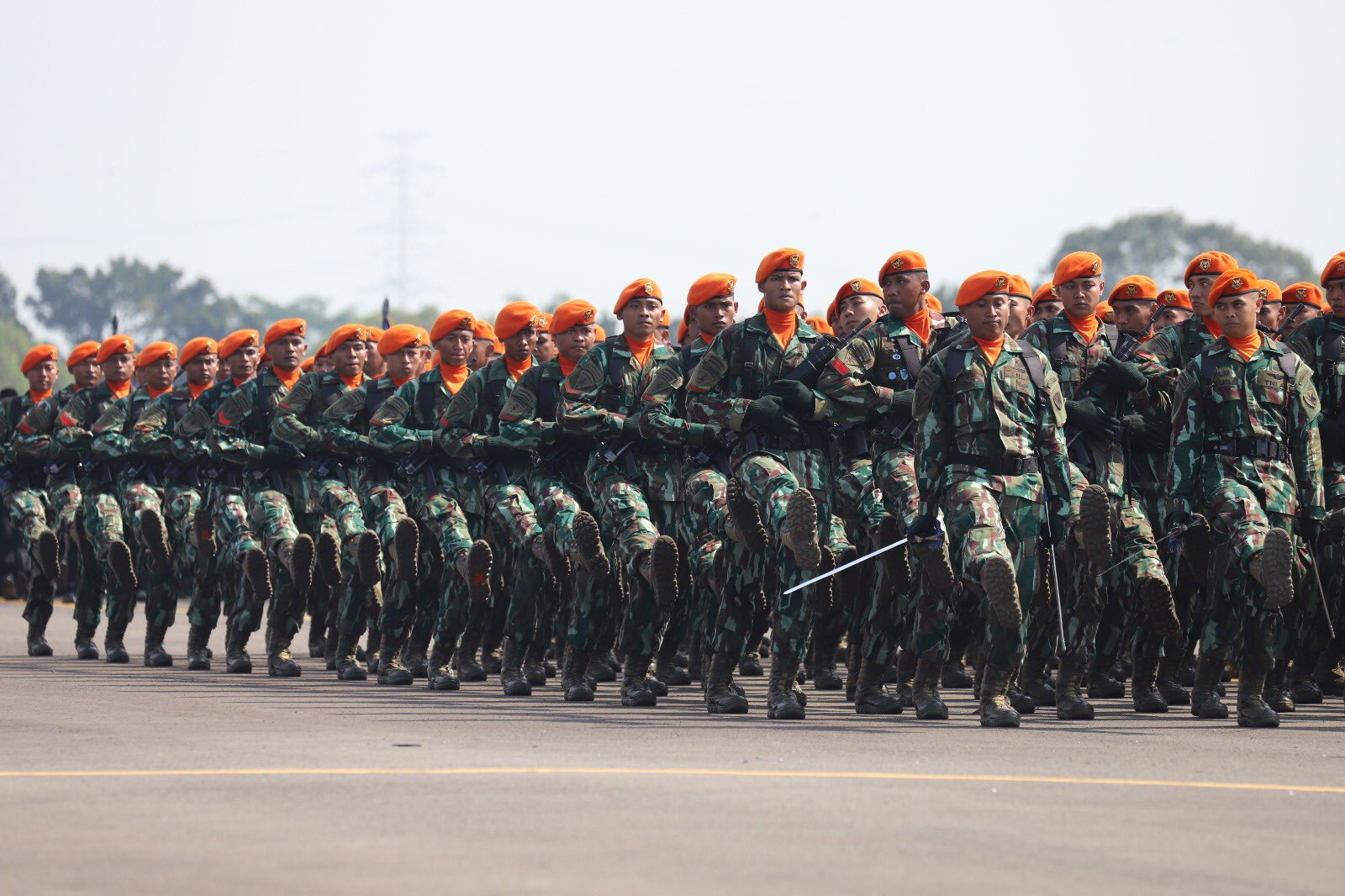
Korpasgat soldiers with their distinct camo

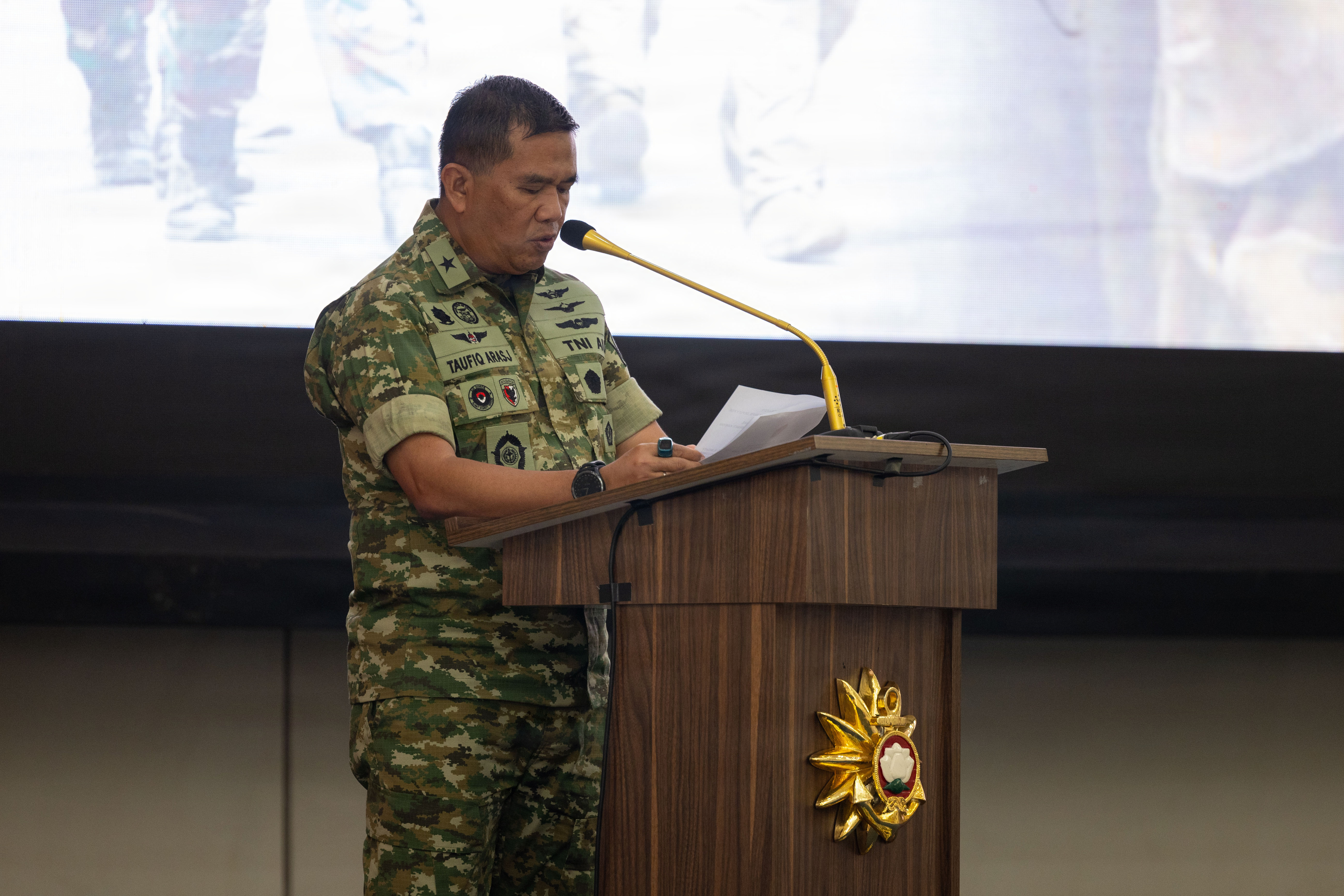
Indonesian National Armed Forces Commodore Taufiq Arasj oufitted with TNI PRIMA camouflage.

== Personnel ==
The Indonesian armed forces are voluntary. The active military strength is 437,400 with 400,000 reserves with available manpower fit for military service of males aged between 16 and 49 is 75,000,000, with a further 4,500,000 new suitable for service annually

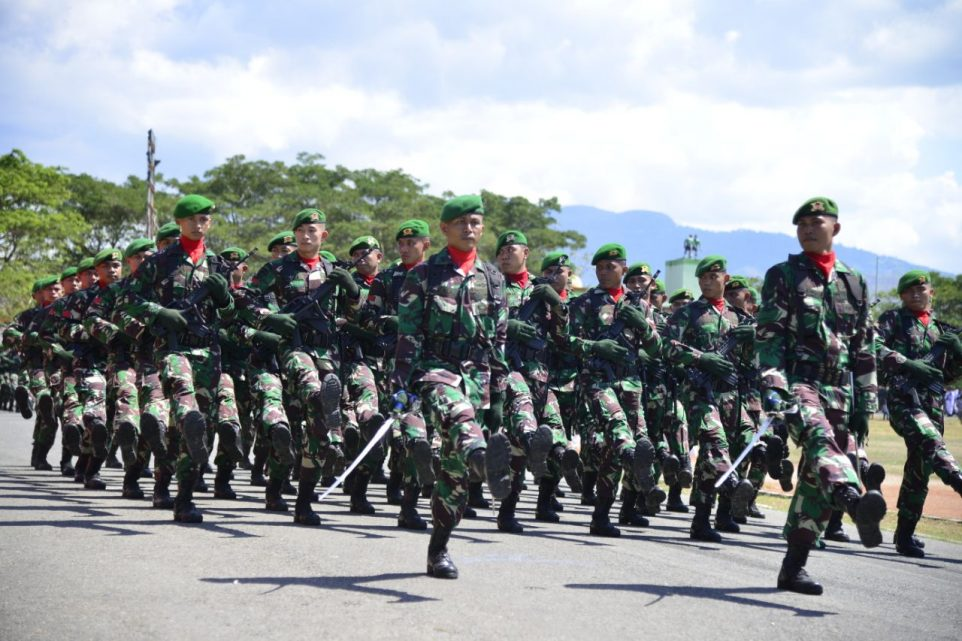
The Indonesian soldier marching with goose step on a parade.

=== Rank structures ===
In the Indonesian Army, Navy (including Marine Corps), Air Force, and the Police Force, the rank consists of officer (Perwira), NCO (Bintara) and enlisted (Tamtama). The rank titles of the Marine Corps are the same as those of the Army, but it still uses the Navy's style insignia (for junior ratings and Marine Corps enlisted personnel, blue replaces the red colour stripe in all orders of uniform dress).

=== Seven Commitments (Sapta Marga) ===
The Seven Commitments is a pledge of loyalty and fidelity of the military personnel to the government and people of Indonesia and to the principles of nationhood.

Original Indonesian	English
1. Kami Warga Negara Kesatuan Republik Indonesia yang bersendikan Pancasila.	We, solemn citizens of the Republic of Indonesia, truthfully believe in Pancasila.
2. Kami Patriot Indonesia, pendukung serta pembela Ideologi Negara yang bertanggung jawab dan tidak mengenal menyerah.	We, patriots of Indonesia, are the forthright supporter and defender of the nation's ideology and shall admit to refuse surrender.
3. Kami Kesatria Indonesia, yang bertaqwa kepada Tuhan Yang Maha Esa, serta membela kejujuran, kebenaran dan keadilan.	We, humble guardians of Indonesia, who believe in the One True God, are ever-committed to uphold honesty, truth and justice.
4. Kami Prajurit Tentara Nasional Indonesia, adalah Bhayangkari Negara dan Bangsa Indonesia.	We, (the servicemen and women) of the Indonesian National Armed Forces, hereby (swear the oath to forever) serve as the champion of the Indonesian nation and its people.
5. Kami Prajurit Tentara Nasional Indonesia, memegang teguh disiplin, patuh dan taat kepada pimpinan serta menjunjung tinggi sikap dan kehormatan prajurit.	We, (the servicemen and women) of the Indonesian National Armed Forces, strive to uphold military discipline, loyalty to the chain of command and promote the honour and conduct of becoming (military) service personnel.
6. Kami Prajurit Tentara Nasional Indonesia, mengutamakan keperwiraan di dalam melaksanakan tugas, serta senantiasa siap sedia berbakti kepada Negara dan Bangsa.	We, (the servicemen and women) of the Indonesian National Armed Forces, will ever exemplify the values of honour in carrying out our duties, and readily answer to the call of the nation at any time of need.
7. Kami Prajurit Tentara Nasional Indonesia, setia dan menepati janji serta Sumpah Prajurit.	And we, (the servicemen and women) of the Indonesian National Armed Forces, will be faithful, loyal and true to our Oath of Duty (Enlistment/Commissioning).

=== Soldier's Oath (Sumpah Prajurit) ===
The Soldier's Oath is a statement of determination expressed since the inception of the Indonesian National Armed Forces, and has become a value system for Indonesian National Armed Forces soldiers that is still upheld and preserved. The Soldier's Oath as an oath, is uttered during the inauguration ceremony for each student soldier to become a soldier of the Indonesian National Armed Forces.

Original Indonesian	English
Demi Allah/Tuhan saya bersumpah / berjanji :	In the Name of God, I swear/promise :
1. Bahwa saya akan setia kepada Negara Kesatuan Republik Indonesia yang berdasarkan Pancasila dan Undang-Undang Dasar 1945.	That I will be loyal to the Unitary Republic of Indonesia, guided by Pancasila and the 1945 Constitution.
2. Bahwa saya akan tunduk kepada hukum dan memegang teguh disiplin keprajuritan.	That I will abide by the Law and uphold Military discipline.
3. Bahwa saya akan taat kepada atasan dengan tidak membantah perintah atau putusan.	That I will adhere to my superiors by not contradicting orders or decisions.
4. Bahwa saya akan menjalankan segala kewajiban dengan penuh rasa tanggung jawab kepada Tentara dan Negara Republik Indonesia.	That I will carry out all obligations with full sense of responsibility to the armed forces and the Republic of Indonesia.
5. Bahwa saya akan memegang segala rahasia Tentara sekeras-kerasnya.	And that I will hold all military secrets to the fullest of my ability, and defend them.

== See also ==
- Foreign relations of Indonesia
- March of the Indonesian National Armed Forces
- List of aircraft of the Indonesian National Armed Forces
- Indonesia and weapons of mass destruction
- Indonesian Cyber Force
- Indonesian Space Force
- Indonesian Maritime Security Agency
- Indonesian Sea and Coast Guard
