= Age of Gerombolan =

Term used for period of Indonesian political instability from post-1949 until 1962

- Part of aftermath of the Indonesian National Revolution
Date	7 August 1949 – 19 October 1967
Location	Indonesia
Result	Government victory: Establishment of the New Order; Indonesian mass killings of 1965–66
Territorial changes	All territories controlled by rebels were recaptured by the government

Belligerents
Republic of Indonesia	Islamic State of Indonesia; 426 Battalion; South Sulawesi Guerrilla Union; Union of the Opressed People; Barisan Sakit Hati Permesta; Justice Defense Force; PRRI; East Indonesia; Legion of Ratu Adil; Republic of South Maluku Communist Party of Indonesia; Bambu Runtjing; Tjitarum Brigade; Merapi-Merbabu Complex

Commanders and leaders
(Indonesia) Sukarno (Indonesia) Suharto	Sekarmadji Maridjan Kartosoewirjo (executed); Abdul Kahar Muzakkar †; Ibnu Hadjar (executed); Sukendro † Alexander Evert Kawilarang (surrendered); Ventje Sumual (surrendered) (Indonesia) Sjafruddin Prawiranegara (surrendered) (Indonesia) Assaat Dt. Mudo (POW); Andi Aziz (POW); Raymond Westerling; Sultan Hamid II (POW); Johanis Manuhutu (POW); Chris Soumokil (executed) Musso (executed); Amir Sjarifuddin (executed); D. N. Aidit (executed); Khaerul Saleh (POW); Suradi Bheledeg †; Tjetje Subrata †

Age of Gerombolan (Indonesian: Zaman Gerombolan), literally translates to Age of Hordes, was a term used for period of political instability and regional armed conflicts mainly between communists, Islamist, and secular nationalist in newly independent Indonesia during the early Liberal democracy period under Sukarno. It is also a term frequently used to refer the direct rule of Darul Islam in rural areas of West Java, South Sulawesi, and South Kalimantan, where Darul Islam militias had strong bases until the early 1960s. Although the specific year is not agreed upon, it is generally referring to conflicts after 1949, and well-used until 1962, although sporadic rebellions mostly under Darul Islam did not end until early 1970s. The term "gerombolan" or hordes is sometimes also used to refer other rebel groups during that time such as Permesta, Mandau Talawang Pancasila, the rebellion under Andi Aziz, and Republic of South Maluku.

== Conflicts and events ==
Conflicts and events in Age of Hordes
Conflict and events	
Republic of South Maluku	Separatist
APRA coup d'état	Federalist
Makassar Uprising	Federalist
Permesta rebellion	Federalist
PRRI rebellion	Federalist
Darul Islam rebellion: South Sulawesi insurgency; South Kalimantan insurgency; 426 Battalion rebellion; Insurgency in Aceh (1953-1962)	Islamist
Madiun affair	Communist
1951 mass arrests in Indonesia	Communist
