= List of wars involving Indonesia =

The following is a list of wars involving Indonesia.

| Conflict or action | Combatant 1 | Combatant 2 | Outcome |
|---|---|---|---|
| Indonesian National Revolution (1945–1949) | Indonesia: PDRI (Note: 1948-1949, after Operation Kraai); TNI; POLRI; Japanese holdouts; India (Note: after 1947) | Netherlands (Note: from 1946): Dutch East Indies; KNIL; NICA; Pao An Tui (Note: claimed neutrality); United Kingdom (Note: until 1946): British Raj; Japan DI/TII (from 1949) FDR Small guerrilla groups | Independence of Indonesia from the Netherlands; End of Dutch rule over most parts of Indonesia, as the Dutch East Indies ceased to exist; Dutch recognition of the Indonesian independence in the Dutch-Indonesian Round Table Conference; Formation of the United States of Indonesia; Creation of the Netherlands-Indonesia Union; Netherlands cedes control of most territories of the Dutch East Indies to the United States of Indonesia |
| Madiun Affair (1948) | Indonesia; TNI; POLRI | FDR; PKI; PS; PBI; SOBSI; Pesindo | Government victory: Dissolution of People's Democratic Front |
| Darul Islam rebellion (1949–1962) | Indonesia | Darul Islam Indonesia; 426 Battalion (1951–1952); Legion of the Just Ruler (until 1950) | Government victory: Dissolution of the Darul Islam; Former Darul Islam veterans form the Komando Jihad; Beginning of a new rebellion in Aceh by the Free Aceh Movement in 1976; Formation of Jemaah Islamiyah as the successor of Komando Jihad; All territories controlled by rebels were recaptured by the government |
| Indonesian invasion of South Maluku (1950–1966) | Indonesia | Republic of South Maluku | Indonesian victory: Moluccas incorporated by Indonesia |
| PRRI-Permesta rebellion (1958–1961) | Indonesia | PRRI; Permesta | Government victory: Rebellion suppressed |
| Operation Trikora (1961–1962) | Indonesia; Soviet Union | Netherlands; Dutch New Guinea | New York Agreement: Military stalemate; Start of the Papua conflict; Western New Guinea ceded to the United Nations then to Indonesia |
| Papua conflict (1962–present) | Indonesia Papua New Guinea | Free Papua Movement | Ongoing |
| Indonesia–Malaysia confrontation (1963–1966) | Indonesia; Aligned parties: PKI; NKCP; PGRS; PRB | The Commonwealth of Nations; United Kingdom; Malaysia (Note: Before Federation, the three separate entities Malaya, Sarawak, and North Borneo participated independently); Singapore (Note: Until 1965); Brunei; Australia; New Zealand | Commonwealth victory: Indonesia accepts formation of Malaysia; Sukarno was replaced by Suharto following G30S coup attempt; Communist insurgency in Sarawak continues until 1989 |
| 30 September Movement (1965) | Indonesia; TNI; Indonesian Army (Suharto factions) Supported by: United Kingdom; United States | 30 September Movement; PKI; Elements of Tjakrabirawa; Angkatan Kelima Militias in Lubang Buaya | Government Victory: PKI and "Communism/Marxist-Leninism" were banned in every circumstances during 1966 MPRS session; Dissolution of Tjakrabirawa, later it will be resurrected as Paswalpres; Marking the start of Transition to the New Order; Outbreak of the Anti-Communist purge in Indonesia |
| Indonesian invasion of East Timor (1975–1978) | Indonesia; ABRI; PGET; UDT; APODETI | East Timor; Fretilin (Falintil) | Indonesian victory: Indonesian occupation of East Timor until 1999; East Timor became an Indonesian province; East Timor genocide |
| Indonesian occupation of East Timor (1976–1999) | Indonesia; Timor Timur; Pro-Indonesian East Timorese factions; UDT (Note: until 1986); APODETI; KOTA (Note: until 1998); Trabalhista (Note: until 1986) | (Timor-Leste) Democratic Republic of East Timor (Until 1976); East Timorese Resistance Groups; Fretilin (Falintil); CNRM (Note: later CNRT); UDT (Note: from 1986) | UN Intervention led by the International Force for East Timor: 1999 East Timorese crisis; Indonesia retains a strong influence in East Timor; East Timor gains independence after an independence referendum votes to become an independent sovereign state |
| Insurgency in Aceh (1976–2005) | Indonesia | Free Aceh Movement Supported by: Libya | Indonesian tactical victory: Helsinki Memorandum of Understanding; Special autonomy granted to Aceh; Disarmament of the GAM; End of GAM's claim of independence; Departure of non-local Indonesian troops, leaving only 25,000 soldiers in the province |
| War on Terror in Indonesia (1981–present) | Indonesia | Islamist groups: Komando Jihad (1970s–1980s); Mujahedeen KOMPAK (1988–?); Islamic State of Indonesia (Fi Sabilillah factions) (1973–2000s); Darul Islam Indonesia (since 2022); Laskar Jihad (2000–2002); Jemaah Islamiyah (2000-2024): Mujahideen Tanah Runtuh (2001–2007); Jamaah Ansharut Tauhid (Until 2014) (Note: Clashed with JI leaders on strategy and tactics. Later pledged allegiance to ISIL.); Indonesian Mujahedeen Council (Note: Irfan S. Awwas assessed the decision to disband Jemaah Islamiyah as "a belated awareness at the wrong time" and refused to disband.); Jamaah Ansharusy Syariah (Note: Splinter of Jamaah Ansharut Tauhid. Claims no affiliation to ISIS or JI.); Jamaah Ansharut Daulah: East Indonesia Mujahideen (2010–2022); Abu Uswah network (2012–2013); West Indonesia Mujahideen (2012–2013); Hizb-ut Tahrir Indonesia; Jamaah Ansharut Tauhid (since 2014) (Note: Pledged allegiance to ISIL. The organization claims it is not a terror organization, however, reports by the Indonesian National Counter Terrorism Agency stated that JAS contributed to 7 out of 142 terrorists captured in 2023.); Abu Oemar network; Turkistan Islamic Party (2014–2016) Separatists: Free Aceh Movement (1976–2005): Din Minimi warband (2014–2015); Free Papua Organization | Ongoing |

== See also ==
- Foreign relations of Indonesia
