= Insurgency in Aceh (1953–1962) =

Indonesian Islamic militants rebellion

Aceh insurgency
- Part of the Darul Islam rebellion and Age of Gerombolan
Date	20 September 1953 – 5 May 1962
Location	Aceh, Sumatra, Indonesia
Result	Government victory
Territorial changes	All territories controlled by rebels were recaptured by the government

Belligerents
Republic of Indonesia	Darul Islam; Supported by: PRRI

Commanders and leaders
(Indonesia) Sjamun Gaharu	Daud Beureueh (surrendered); Hasan Saleh (surrendered)

The Insurgency in Aceh was an insurgency waged by local branch of Darul Islam to establish Islamic law in the Aceh region of Sumatra.

== Rebellion ==
On 20 September 1953 attacks took place simultaneously across Aceh. Insurgents led by Chazali Idris overran the town of Peureulak followed by nearby towns of Idi and Bayeuen. The other towns that rebels managed to occupy included Bireuën, Tangse, Geumpang, Meureudu, Takengon, Tapak Tuan and Seulimeum. On 21 September the towns of Langsa, Sigli and Lhokseumawe were attacked, but Indonesian army managed to repel rebels.

Immediately, Indonesian forces launched a counteroffensive to recapture lost towns. On 23 September Republican troops recaptured Bayeuen, followed by Idi and Peureulak the next two days. At the same time naval forces landed in Bireuen. Navy landed in Meureudu and Tembu on 22 October. On 24 November soldiers reached Tangse. On 3 December the last rebel stronghold at Tangse was overran.

In late 1956 rebels reportedly still had 1,400 fighters. During the PRRI rebellion a number of commanders and fighters joined Darul Islam in Aceh. On 26 May 1959 the Lamteh Pledge was signed between the rebels and government granting Aceh a special status. On 5 May 1962 Daud Beureueh surrendered, ending the rebellion.

== Leadership ==
- Daud Beureueh: Political leader of the rebellion
- Hasan Saleh: Military leader of the rebellion
- Sulaiman Daud: Aceh Besar Regency commander
- Hasan Ali: Commander of the Pidie Regency
- Husein Yusuf and H. Abubakar Ibrahim: leaders in North Aceh
- Husin Almudjahid in East Aceh
- Hasan Hanafiah in West Aceh
