= Tjilik Riwut =

Indonesian national hero (1918–1987)

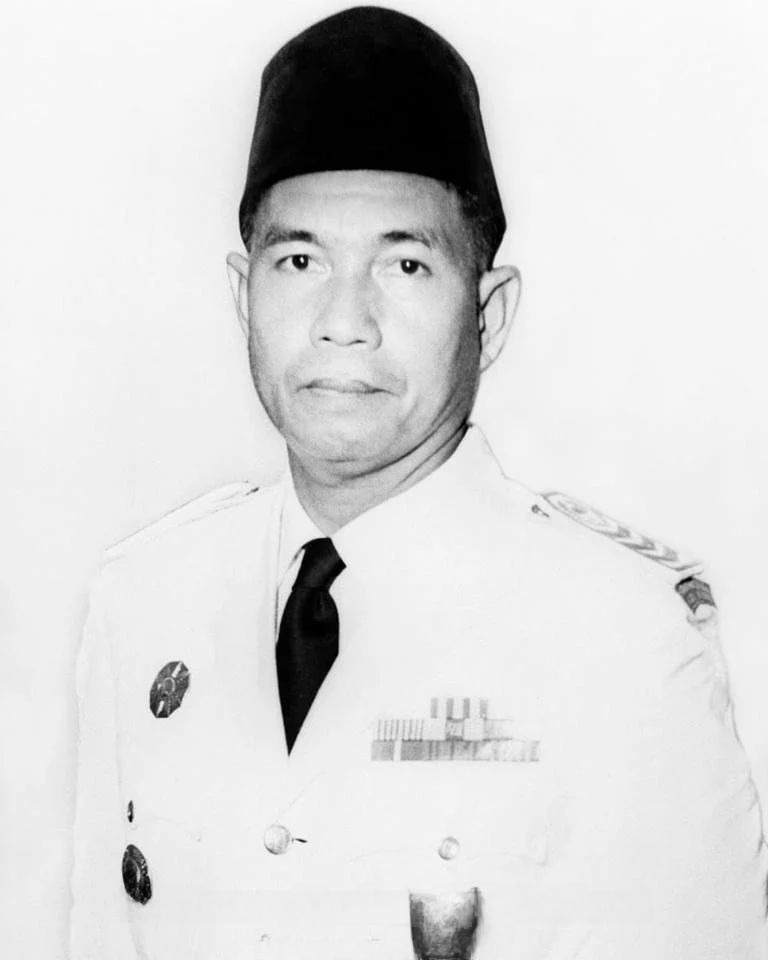
- Official portrait, c. 1950's – 1960's

2nd (Note: Tjilik served as the first official governor of Central Kalimantan, however, R. T. A. Milono served as the province's founding and caretaker governor.) Governor of Central Kalimantan
- In office 23 December 1959 (Note: Tjilik took office as governor on 30 June 1958, however, he was only inaugurated by the Ministry of Home Affairs on 23 December 1959.) – 17 February 1967
- Deputy: Reinout Sylvanus
- Preceded by: R. T. A. Milono
- Succeeded by: Reinout Sylvanus

Personal details
- Born: 2 February 1918 Kasongan, Katingan, Southern and Eastern Afdeelings of Borneo Residency, Dutch East Indies
- Died: 17 August 1987 (aged 69) Banjarmasin, South Kalimantan, Indonesia
- Resting place: Sanaman Lampang Heroes Cemetery, Palangka Raya
- Spouse: Clementine Suparti
- Children: 5
- Education: Indonesian Air Force Academy

Military service
- Allegiance: Indonesia
- Branch/service: Indonesian Air Force
- Rank: Air Commodore
- Unit: Paskhas

Anakletus Tjilik Riwut (2 February 1918 – 17 August 1987) was an Indonesian military officer and journalist who served as the governor of Central Kalimantan from 1959 to 1967. He participated in the Indonesian National Revolution, becoming one of the leaders of the Kalimantan Physical Revolution in Dutch Borneo. In 1988, the government of Indonesia declared him a national hero.

Born in Kasongan, Katingan, Central Kalimantan, on 2 February 1918, to a Ngaju tribe family, he completed his elementary school education in his hometown of Kasongan. Then he migrated to Java to continue his studies at the Peraaat School in Purwakarta and Bandung. He became a member of the Central Indonesian National Committee (KNIP), but he later joined the Armed Forces of the Republic of Indonesia (ABRI) and attained the rank of Major and later First Marshal, by fighting the Dutch colonial authorities and leading the first Parachute Operation in the history of ABRI. He also succeeded in fully integrating the Dutch portion of Borneo into Indonesia.

After the recognition of Indonesian sovereignty by the Dutch on 27 December 1949, Tjilik Riwut took part in the regional government of Kalimantan. Becoming the Wedana of Sampit, the Regent of Kotawaringin, the coordinator of isolated tribal communities for the entire interior of Kalimantan, and a member of the People's Representative Council and the Supreme Advisory Council. Tjilik Riwut then became the military governor of the Central Kalimantan region in 1958. During his tenure, he negotiated and protected the region from the Darul Islam and Mandau Talawang Pancasila rebellions. He also mediated the selection of the provincial capital to avoid further conflicts between competing Dayak tribes by choosing the village of Pahandut, which is now Palangka Raya. He officially became the first governor of Central Kalimantan in 1958, but wasn't inaugurated until 23 December 1959.

Following the aftermath of the 30 September Movement, he was forced to resign in February 1967, due to his close association with president Sukarno, whom he was friends with. He died on 17 August 1987 in Banjarmasin due to complications from hepatitis and was buried in Sanaman Lampang Palangka Raya Heroes Cemetery. He was declared an Indonesian National Hero on 6 November 1988. The biggest airport in Central Kalimantan, Tjilik Riwut Airport, is named after him. In 2018, government of Palangka Raya city built a statue of him in the middle of the city.

== Biography ==
=== Early life ===
Tjilik Riwut was born in Kasongan, Katingan, Central Kalimantan, on 2 February 1918. He was born into a Ngaju tribe family, with his father being named Riwut Dahiang and his mother being named Piai Sulang. When he was born, both of his eyes were wide open, which was unusual. Leading to his parents giving him the nickname of "Silik," which means "peek." As a child, he grew up in the jungles of Kalimantan, and was described as intelligent and resourceful (although living in a modest rural environment). Once, while playing football, he wore a fake prosthetic wooden leg under his trousers to appear taller to play, and injured several of his opponents, who had hit his leg. He often referred to himself as an "orang hutan," which literally translates to "jungle man." He also circled the island of Borneo three times, on foot, by boat and by raft.

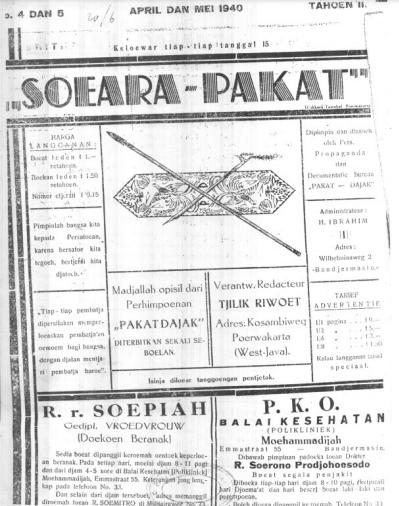
Soeara Pakat, newspaper by Pakat Dayak which was managed by Tjilik Riwut

=== Education ===
Tjilik firstly attended the Sekolah Rakyat ("People's School"), in his home town of Kasongan for his early education. When he was in fifth grade, he was assigned by the principal to help teach at the Luwuk Kanan village downstream of Kasongan, with him teaching up to once every week. As a teenager, he left Kalimantan and migrated to Java, to pursue further education. While studying in Java, Tjilik became interested in journalism, eventually becoming a journalist under the guidance of Sanusi Pane at the Pemgoenan Daily. After that, he was entrusted with managing the editorship of Soeara Pakat, a newspaper belonging to the Pakat Dayak association or Sarikat Dayak. Also during this time, he began to get involved in the struggle for independence.

=== Struggle for independence ===
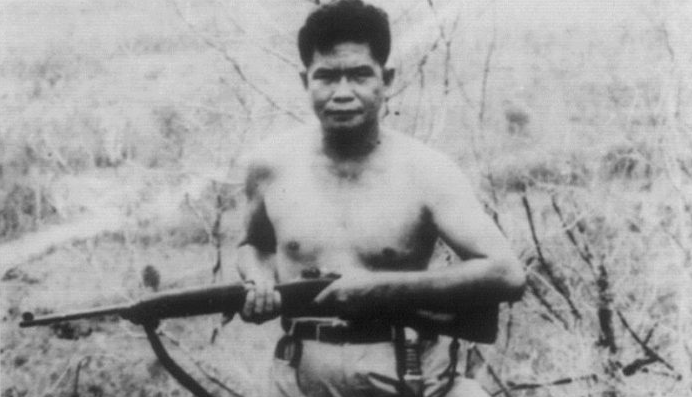
Tjilik Riwut fighting in the Kalimantan mountains

Following the proclamation of independence, he represented tens of thousands of Dayaks, and swore allegiance to the Indonesian government in a customary manner before President Sukarno at the Gedung Agung Yogyakarta on 17 December 1946. He was then sent by the Republican government to Kalimantan, as a member of the Entourage of Government of the Republic of Indonesia ("Rombongan Oetoesan Pemerintah RI"), which aimed to form an armed force in the form of the MN 1001 unit.

Later, when Indonesian Air Force commander Surjadi Surjadarma asked all native Kalimantan Indonesian nationalists to join the air force. Surjadarma wanted to establish a line of communication between Kalimantan and other regions in Indonesia and also to break the Dutch blockade between islands. Tjilik and around 60 other Indonesian nationalists were trained in former Japanese facilities in Maguwo and Wonocatur. However, only 12 were qualified for this mission, which would be the first airborne mission conducted by the Indonesian Air Force, which included Tjilik, who became a military officer with rank major.

The operation failed in its objective to transport native Kalimantan Indonesian nationalists without being caught, and after waging more than a month of insurgency in Kalimantan jungles, all the personnel including Tjilik were arrested and jailed in Banjarmasin. They were eventually released in the aftermath of Dutch–Indonesian Round Table Conference.

=== Post-independence career ===
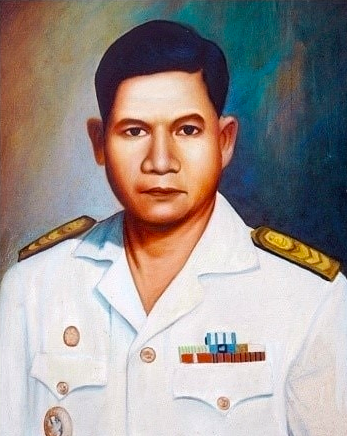
Another portrait of Tjilik Riwut, as governor

After the recognition of Indonesian sovereignty by the Dutch on 27 December 1949, Tjilik Riwut took part in the regional government of Kalimantan. Becoming the Wedana of Sampit, the Regent of Kotawaringin, the coordinator of isolated tribal communities for the entire interior of Kalimantan, and a member of the People's Representative Council and the Supreme Advisory Council. Whilst serving as Regent of Kotawaringin, he nationalized the Dutch-owned Bruynzeel timber operations.

Tjilik Riwut became the military governor of the Central Kalimantan region in 1958. During his tenure as military governor, he negotiated and protected the region from the Darul Islam and Mandau Talawang Pancasila rebellions, through the implementation of martial law. He also mediated the selection of the provincial capital to end further conflicts between competing Dayak tribes by choosing the village of Pahandut, which is now Palangka Raya. He officially became the second governor of Central Kalimantan in 1958, but wasn't inaugurated until 23 December 1959.

However, following the 30 September Movement and the change of political winds, Tjilik Riwut was labeled as a "Sukarnoist," for his close association with president Sukarno and he was forced to resign on 17 February 1967. One of his daughters, Ida Riwut, recalled that the transition was accompanied by a number of demonstrations targeting her father.

=== Later career and death ===
On 17 August 1987, coinciding with the 42nd anniversary of Indonesian independence, at 04:55 am Central Indonesian Time, Tjilik Riwut died at the age of 69, after being treated at the Suaka Insan Hospital, in Banjarmasin, due to hepatitis. His body was interred at the Sanaman Lampang Palangka Raya Heroes Cemetery, Palangka Raya, Central Kalimantan.

== Legacy ==
=== Honors ===
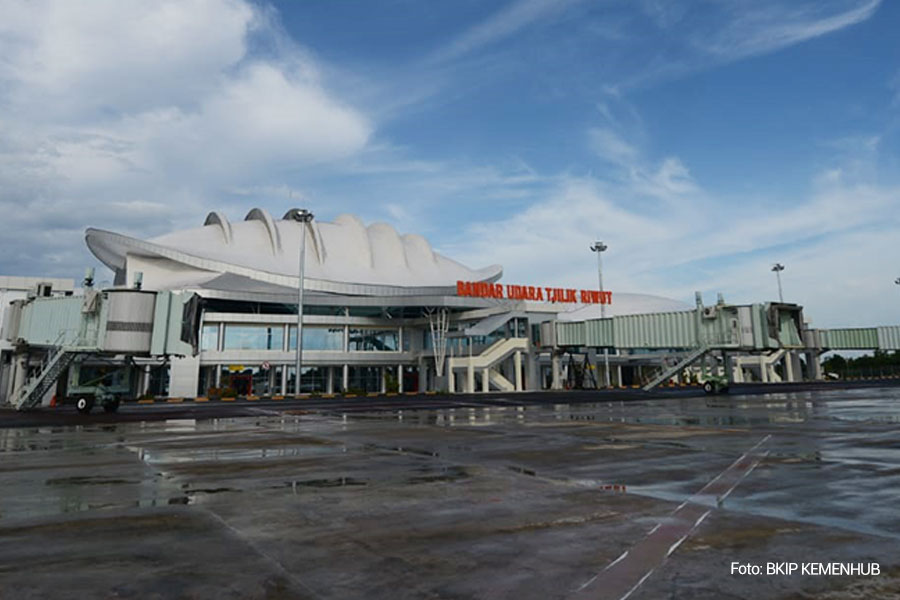
Tjilik Riwut Airport, Palangkaraya, formerly Panarung Airport, which is named after Tjilik Riwut.

- On 6 November 1998, Tjilik Riwut was inaugurated as a National Hero of Indonesia for his services, through Presidential order No.108/TK/1998.
- On 10 November 1988, coinciding with Indonesian Heroes' Day, his name was enshrined for the name of the Palangkaraya Airport, which was previously known as Panarung Airport. The name change was carried out by the Minister of Transport, Azwar Anas.
- In 2018, government of Palangka Raya city built a statue of him in the middle of the city.

=== Writings ===
Tjilik Riwut wrote a number of books about the Dayak people from his perspective and experiences during the National Revolution. Most of his books were published by his daughter, Nila Riwut, after his death. Some of his books today are used as academic introduction to Dayak culture in Indonesia. These books include :

- Makanan Dayak ("Dayak Food") (1948)
- Sejarah Kalimantan ("History of Kalimantan") (1952)
- Maneser Panatau Tatu Hiang; Menyelami Kekayaan Leluhur
  ("Maneser Panatau Tatu Hiang; Dive into the Wealth of the Ancestors) (1965)
- Stensilan dalam bahasa Dayak Ngaju ("Stencils in the Ngaju Dayak language") (1979)
- Kalimantan Membangun ("Kalimantan builds") (1979)
- Kalimantan Memanggil ("Kalimantan calls") (1958)
- Memperkenalkan Kalimantan Tengah dan Pembangunan Kota Palangka Raya
  ("Introducing Central Kalimantan and the Development of the City of Palangka Raya") (1962).

== Personal life ==
He was married to Clementine Suparti, an ethnic Javanese Roman Catholic woman (for he converted via baptism prior to his marriage) and together they had five children namely Emiliana Enon Herjani, Anastasia Ratna Hawun Meiarti, Theresia Nila Ambun Triwati, a Dayak writer, Ida Riwut, and Anakletus Tarung Tjandra Utama. In addition, he also had a uniquely close relationship with president Sukarno, with him being labeled a "Sukarnoist" during the transition to the New Order. In a 2004 documentary, former governor of North and Central Sulawesi A. A. Baramuli said of him to be "most loved by Bung Karno."
