= South Kalimantan insurgency =

Indonesian Islamic militants rebellion

- Part of the Darul Islam rebellion and Age of Gerombolan
Date	1950 – July 1963
Location	Indonesia, Borneo, South Kalimantan
Result	Government victory
Territorial changes	All territories controlled by rebels were recaptured by the government

Belligerents
Republic of Indonesia	Union of the Opressed People (1950-1954); Darul Islam (1954-1963)

Commanders and leaders
	Ibnu Hadjar (executed)

The South Kalimantan insurgency was an insurgency waged by the Union of the Opressed People (subsequently rebranded as Darul Islam branch) to establish Islamic law in southern part of the Borneo island in Indonesia.

== Background ==
In the aftermath of the revolution, the government conducted reorganization of the army which resulted in many militias excluded from the army. There was a tension especially between those of former Royal Netherlands East Indies Army whom are more favoured in the army recruitment and those who are not. Hadjar was illiterate and as the result he was not accepted to the army and later founded Kesatuan Rakjat jang Tertindas (KRjT, Union of the Oppressed People) to start insurgencies supported by his fellow militias that were also not accepted to the army.

== Rebellion ==
In October 1950, the government informed that they would accept the insurgents who wanted to surrender. Hadjar visited Kandangan and told them that he had surrendered. The government asked Hadjar to persuade his colleagues to surrender. However, he did not do it and instead led an insurrection against the government. In early 1951, the chairman of Hulu Sungai Regional People's Representative, Zafry Zamzam, persuaded Ibnu Hadjar to surrender. During the early four years (1950–1954), Ibnu Hadjar and his forces attacked Kandangan four times, and the government managed to repulse them. Likewise, he also planned two attacks in Banjarmasin, which were in August 1953 and 1954 new year and the government thwarted the plans. On 7 January 1953 commander Kartoio (real name Asmuni) was captured in Tanjung. On 14 June 1954 a police patrol discovered a gang's hideout in Kepajang in Kotabaru Regency on the island of the Laut Island. In the ensuing fight, the gang was put to flight, leaving behind two dead, five rifles, a quantity of ammunition.

== Joining Darul Islam ==
At the end of 1954, Ibnu Hadjar announced that KjRT joined Darul Islam after Kartosoewirjo offered him a ministerial position in Islamic State of Indonesia. Kartosoewirjo appointed Ibnu Hadjar as the Darul Islam Territorial Commandant of Kalimantan. After KjRT joined Darul Islam, Ibnu Hadjar made several changes. He proclaimed himself as Ulul-Amri and named his forces into Angkatan Perang Tentara Islam (Islamic Army War Forces/APTI). Likewise, he renamed his headquarter to Istana Islam Merdeka (Free Islamic Palace).

In August 1954 commander Gusti Surjah was captured and executed in Banjar. In November 1954 there were reportedly 300 insurgents active in the region armed with 13 Bren guns and other weapons. Around 30 insurgents were based on the Laut island and led by Badri and some insurgents with a few rifles on the Matasiri island. In that month the rebel headquarters in Datar Laga was burned down.

On 4 February 1956 25 gang members arrested in Batulicin during a raid. On 14 May 1956 commander Raden Mochtar surrendered. On 2 January 1958 the government reported that forty insurgents were killed during fighting between troops of the Indonesian army and armed gangs in the Kotabaru Regency, in South Borneo. In September 1961 dissident leader Ali Hamdi surrendered together with 23 followers in Baruh Batung.

== End of the rebellion ==
In 1963, DI/TII South Kalimantan's strength weakened because of intensive military operations, with rebels being reportedly down to 40 fighters. Looking at this situation, the police chief of South Kalimantan, Tengku Abdul Aziz, persuaded Hadjar and the rest of his forces to surrender with the promise of amnesty from the Jakarta government. Realizing that his forces were at the corner, he accepted the government's demand for surrender in July 1963. Subsequently, he and his small forces went to Ambutun and laid over the weapons to the government. On the next day, Hadjar attended the mass meeting in support of Indonesia–Malaysia confrontation in Banjarmasin and he said to the press that not only did he support it, but he was also willing to participate in the confrontation with his 14.000 soldiers.

In September 1963, the police arrested Ibnu Hadjar. Afterwards, he was brought to Banjarmasin and later to Jakarta. In Jakarta, he was put on trial by the military court, and received a death sentence on 11 March 1965. He was executed on 22 March.
