= Tjilik Riwut Airport =

Airport in Palangkaraya, Central Kalimantan, Indonesia

Tjilik Riwut Airport Bandar Udara Tjilik Riwut
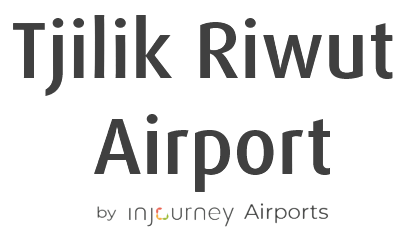

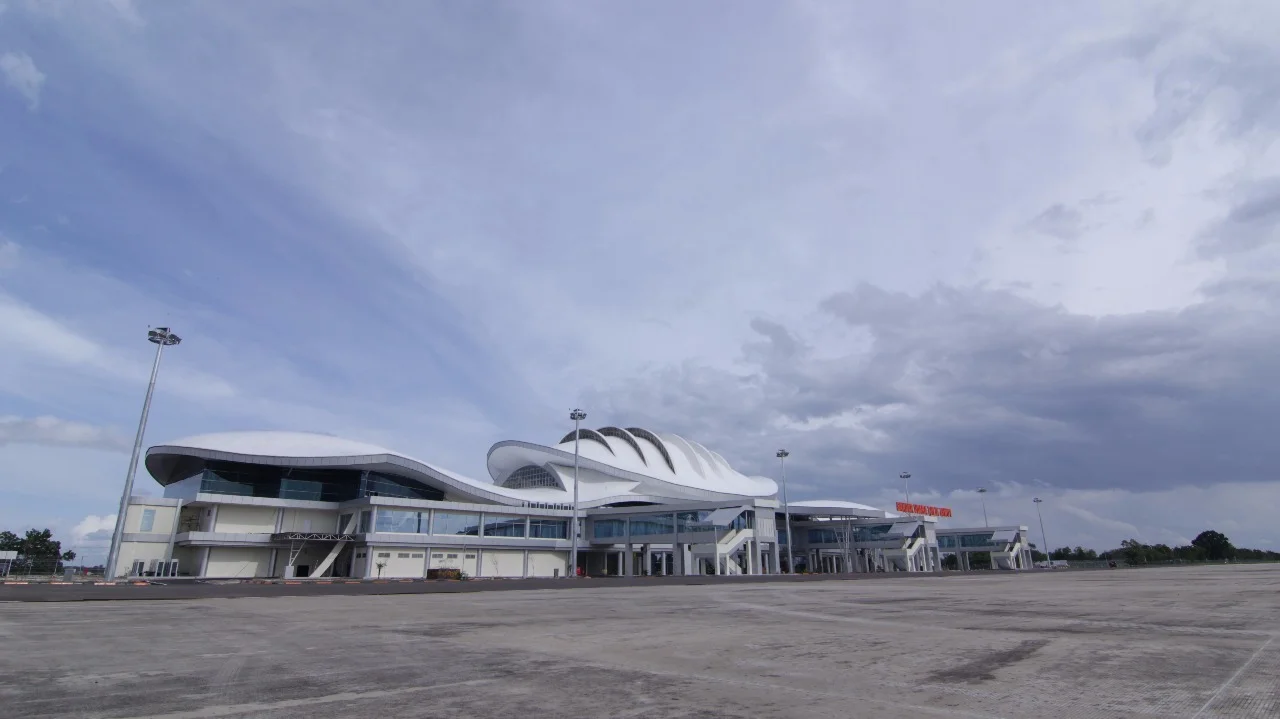
- IATA: PKY; ICAO: WAGG; WMO: 96655

Summary
- Airport type: Public
- Owner: Government of Indonesia
- Operator: InJourney Airports
- Serves: Palangkaraya
- Location: Palangkaraya, Central Kalimantan, Indonesia
- Opened: 1 May 1958; 68 years ago
- Time zone: WIB (UTC+07:00)
- Elevation AMSL: 82 ft (25 m)
- Coordinates: 02°13′30″S 113°56′33″E
- Website: www.tjilikriwut-airport.co.id

Map
- Location of airport in Central Kalimantan / Indonesia PKY (Kalimantan) PKY (Indonesia)

Runways
Direction	Length		Surface
Direction	m	ft	Surface
16/34	2,600	8,530	Asphalt

Statistics (2024)
- Passengers: 726,504 (▲4.5%)
- Cargo (tonnes): 13,425 (▲21.5%)
- Aircraft movements: 6,659 (▼15.9%)
- Source: DGCA

Tjilik Riwut Airport (IATA: PKY, ICAO: WAGG), formerly Panarung Airport, is a domestic airport serving Palangkaraya, the capital city of Central Kalimantan, Indonesia. Located approximately 4.5 km (2.8 miles) from the center of Palangkaraya, the airport is named after Anakletus Tjilik Riwut (1918–1987), an Indonesian Air Force officer and politician of Dayak Ngaju descent. He served as the second governor of Central Kalimantan and is recognized as a national hero of Indonesia. As the largest and busiest airport in Central Kalimantan, it serves as the primary gateway to Palangkaraya and one of the main points of entry to the province. The airport offers regular flights to major Indonesian cities such as Jakarta, Semarang, and Surabaya, and also connects to remote areas in the interior of Kalimantan.

In addition to serving commercial flights, the airport also hosts the Angkasa Aviation Academy, a pilot training school operated by the Lion Air Group. It is the second branch of the academy, following the first campus located at Penggung Airport in Cirebon.

== History ==
=== Construction and early history ===
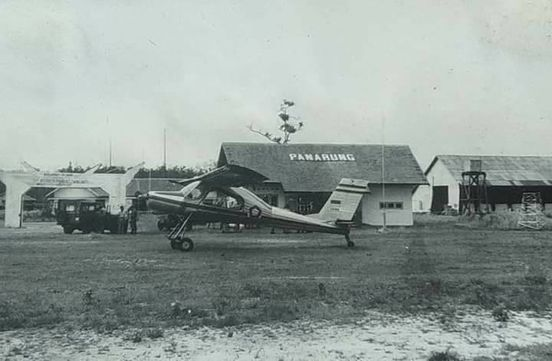
Panarung Airfield, c. 1960–1970

Tjilik Riwut Airport was originally known as Panarung Airfield, established on 1 May 1958, and officially inaugurated by Tjilik Riwut, who was then the Resident of Central Kalimantan. At the time, it was classified as a rural airfield and could only serve limited rural flights using small aircraft such as the de Havilland Canada DHC-6 Twin Otter. Merpati Nusantara Airlines soon began operating scheduled services to Palangkaraya using Twin Otter aircraft, but these services were suspended during the transition to the New Order in the mid-to-late 1960s. Air services resumed in 1971, when Bouraq Indonesian Airlines began operating routes to Palangkaraya using Douglas DC-3 aircraft.

On 24 September 1973, the Central Kalimantan regional government officially handed over the airfield to the Directorate General of Civil Aviation under the Ministry of Transportation. Following the transfer, full administrative responsibility shifted from the regional to the central government, which began upgrading the airport's facilities, including extending the runway to 1,500 m × 30 m and improving other airport infrastructure. The upgrades were completed in February 1974, allowing the airport to accommodate Fokker F27 aircraft, with the first test landing conducted using an aircraft operated by Bouraq. Bouraq subsequently began operating inter-Kalimantan flights to and from Palangkaraya, including routes such as Banjarmasin–Palangkaraya–Pangkalan Bun and Semarang–Pangkalan Bun–Palangkaraya–Banjarmasin.

In November 1988, Tjilik Riwut was officially designated a National Hero of Indonesia through Presidential Decree No. 108/TK/1988. He was already a well-respected figure among the people of Central Kalimantan, known for his role as a freedom fighter during the Indonesian National Revolution. Tjilik Riwut initially served as a member of the Central Indonesian National Committee (KNIP) before joining the Indonesian Air Force, where he rose to the rank of Major and later Air Commodore. He played a key role in the fight against Dutch colonial forces and led the first parachute operation in Indonesian military history. He was also instrumental in fully integrating the Dutch-controlled territories in Borneo into the Republic of Indonesia. Tjilik Riwut later became the second governor of Central Kalimantan. To honor his legacy, the name of Panarung Airfield was officially changed to Tjilik Riwut Airport on Heroes' Day, 10 November 1988. The renaming was formalized by the Minister of Transportation at the time, Azwar Anas.

=== Contemporary history ===
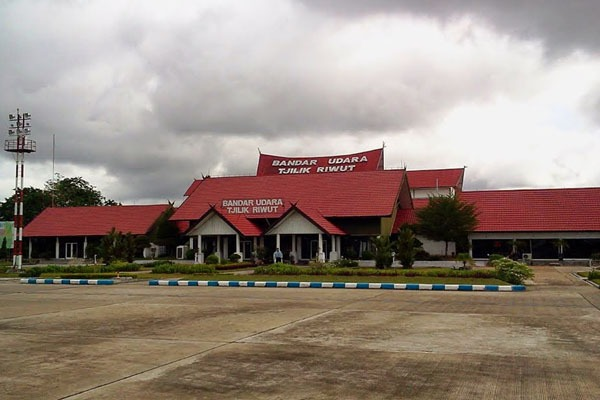
Former passenger terminal of Tjilik Riwut Airport, used until 2019

By the late 1990s, the airport had undergone further upgrades to accommodate aircraft as large as the Douglas DC-9 and Fokker 100. During the decade, several airlines operated services at Palangkaraya, including Merpati Nusantara Airlines, which served Jakarta using Fokker F28 aircraft, and Sempati Air, which operated flights to Banjarmasin, Balikpapan, and Surabaya using Fokker F27 aircraft.

On 15 August 2007, Garuda Indonesia resumed direct flights between Jakarta and Palangkaraya, marking its return to the city after nearly two decades. Garuda Indonesia had first launched a Palangkaraya–Jakarta service on 10 August 1984, using the Fokker F28. However, the service operated for only four years, until 1988, when the Indonesian government began integrating the operations of Garuda Indonesia and Merpati Nusantara Airlines. Under the resulting policy, most of Garuda Indonesia’s domestic routes were transferred to Merpati, while Garuda focused primarily on international services, with Merpati serving as its domestic feeder airline. Merpati subsequently withdrew from Palangkaraya altogether amid growing competition from airlines such as Sriwijaya Air and Batavia Air, ending its services to both Jakarta and Surabaya.

On 1 January 2019, the Minister of Transportation transferred the operations of the airport from the Directorate General of Civil Aviation to Angkasa Pura II, now known as InJourney Airports.

Following the opening of the new terminal in 2019, all passenger flights were relocated there, leaving the old terminal abandoned and increasingly overgrown with vegetation. Although there are plans to convert the old terminal into a cargo facility, these have yet to be implemented. There are also proposals to repurpose the building as an Emergency Operations Center, which would function as a command hub for managing critical situations such as aircraft hijackings, accidents, and other emergencies. In addition, it is intended to serve as a coordination center for the National Agency for Disaster Countermeasure (BNPB) and helicopter operators during forest fire response operations.

== Facilities and development ==
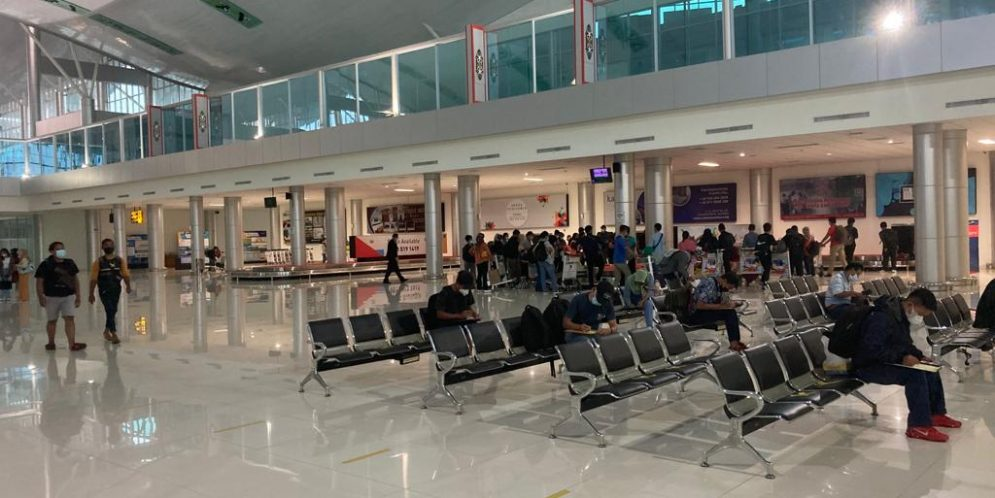
Baggage claim area

To accommodate the growing number of passengers, major developments were undertaken at the airport, encompassing both the landside and airside facilities. Construction began in 2014 and took approximately four and a half years to complete. A total investment of around 700 billion Rupiah was allocated for the terminal and associated infrastructure. The new terminal was completed and officially inaugurated by then-President Joko Widodo on 8 April 2019.

The new terminal spans 29,124 m^{2}, significantly larger than the old terminal, which covered only 3,865 m^{2}. It has the capacity to handle up to 4.5 million passengers annually, The boarding area can accommodate up to 2,200 passengers daily, compared with just 600 passengers at the former terminal. The terminal is also equipped with three jetbridges, previously used at Soekarno–Hatta International Airport. The terminal features a distinctive architectural design, with a roof shaped like deer antlers—a symbol of strength and courage in Dayak culture—while incorporating modern elements such as spacious waiting areas, environmentally friendly facilities, and state-of-the-art security technology.

Additionally, the project involved constructing new taxiways and expanding the aprons to accommodate more aircraft, as well as extending the runway to 2,600 m, capable of accommodating narrow-body aircraft such as the Boeing 737 and the Airbus A320. It is supported by two taxiways, each measuring 150 m × 23 m, and an apron measuring 328 m × 110 m. The airport also has parking stands capable of accommodating up to four wide-body aircraft. Angkasa Pura II has allocated an additional 480 billion Rupiah for further development projects at the airport, including plans to extend the runway by 400 m to 3,000 m to accommodate wide-body aircraft.

Other proposed developments under consideration include the construction of MRO (Maintenance, Repair, and Overhaul) facilities, a new cargo terminal, airport hotels, and various supporting amenities.

== Airlines and destinations ==
=== Passenger ===
Airlines	Destinations
Batik Air	Jakarta–Soekarno-Hatta
Citilink	Jakarta–Soekarno-Hatta, Surabaya
Garuda Indonesia	Jakarta–Soekarno-Hatta
Lion Air	Surabaya
Smart Aviation	Puruk Cahu
Super Air Jet	Jakarta–Soekarno-Hatta, Semarang, Surabaya, Yogyakarta–International
Susi Air	Kuala Pembuang, Muara Teweh, Puruk Cahu
Wings Air	Balikpapan

== Statistics ==
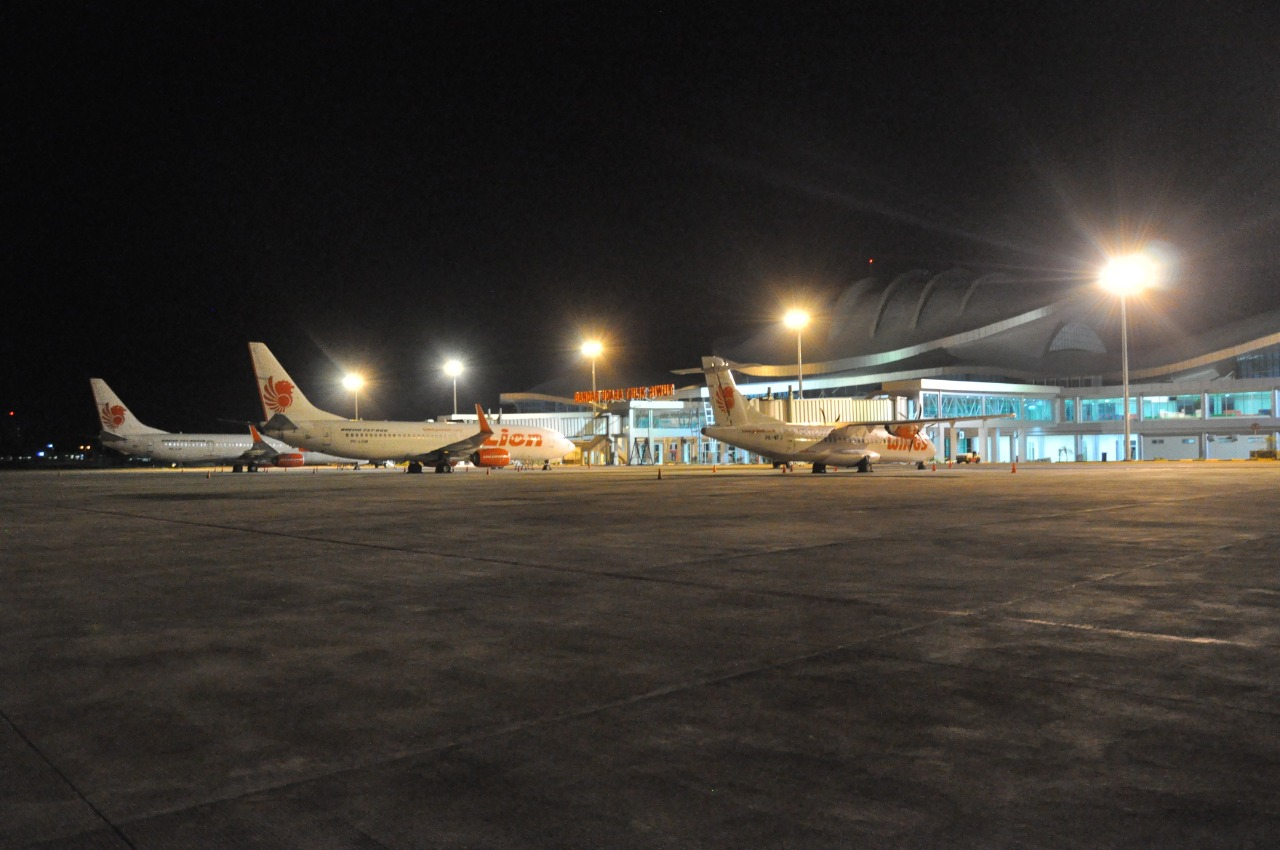
Two Lion Air Boeing 737s and a Wings Air ATR 72 at Tjilik Riwut Airport

Annual passenger numbers and aircraft statistics
Year	Passengers handled	Passenger % change	Cargo (tonnes)	Cargo % change	Aircraft movements	Aircraft % change
2006	N/A	Steady	N/A	Steady	N/A	Steady
2007	246,917	Steady	1,933	Steady	2,773	Steady
2008	276,600	▲12.0	1,997	▲3.3	3,622	▲30.6
2009	327,132	▲	2,057	▲3.0	5,331	▲47.2
2010	291,556	▼10.9	1,896	▼7.8	5,547	▲4.1
2011	615,909	▲111.2	3,671	▲93.6	5,929	▲6.9
2012	724,783	▲17.7	4,460	▲21.5	7,342	▲23.8
2013	745,561	▲2.9	4,540	▲1.8	10,372	▲41.3
2014	733,804	▼1.6	4,455	▼1.9	14,025	▲35.2
2015	680,406	▼7.3	3,845	▼13.7	16,933	▲20.7
2016	740,965	▲8.9	3,962	▲3.0	23,467	▲38.6
2017	531,773	▼28.2	2,903	▼26.7	19,891	▼15.2
2018	1,050,093	▲97.5	5,719	▲97.0	9,820	▼50.6
2019	617,334	▼41.2	2,626	▼54.1	17,321	▲76.4
2020	306,767	▼50.3	2,947	▲12.2	4,362	▼74.8
2021	401,228	▲30.8	11,315	▲283.9	6,319	▲44.9
2022	562,921	▲40.3	12,765	▲12.8	6,538	▲3.5
2023	695,120	▲23.5	11,047	▼13.5	7,921	▲21.2
2024	726,504	▲4.5	13,425	▲21.5	6,659	▼15.9
^{Source: DGCA, BPS}

== Accidents and incidents ==
- On 14 December 2016, Lion Air Flight 867, operated by a Boeing 737-800 from Jakarta to Palangka Raya, skidded off the runway at Tjilik Riwut Airport after landing while taxiing toward the apron. The aircraft’s nose gear became stuck in a 10-cm-deep hole. Airport management attributed the incident to pilot error, alleging that the pilot misjudged the turn while taxiing from the runway. No passengers or crew members were injured. The incident resulted in the temporary closure of the airport for approximately 1.5 hours while the aircraft was removed.
