= Makassar Uprising =

Skirmish between Indonesian and ex-Dutch soldiers

- Part of the Age of Gerombolan
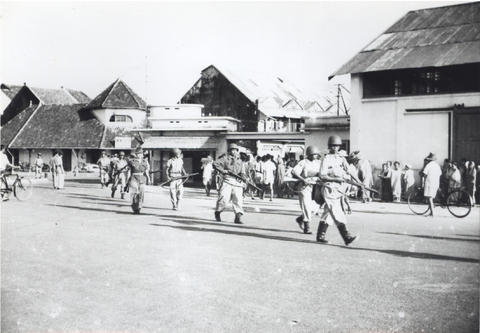
- Worang Battalion of the central government, occupying Makassar Port, 20–21 April 1950
Date	5–21 April 1950
Location	Makassar and Jakarta, Indonesia
Result	Accelerated integration of the RIS federal states into the Republic of Indonesia by 17 August 1950.

Belligerents
United States of Indonesia; South Sulawesi Guerrilla Unit	State of East Indonesia

Commanders and leaders
Alex Kawilarang; Suharto; Hamengkubuwana IX	Andi Aziz (POW)

Units involved
National Armed Forces of the United States of Indonesia (APRIS)	Remnants of the Royal Netherlands East Indies Army (KNIL)

Casualties and losses
- At least 17 APRIS soldiers were reported killed, and further losses occurred during heavy fighting.

The Makassar Uprising, also known as Andi Aziz rebellion (Indonesian: Pemberontakan Andi Aziz), was a skirmish in Makassar, East Indonesia, between former Royal Dutch East Indies Army soldiers under Captain Andi Aziz and the Republic of the United States of Indonesia government. The purpose of the uprising was to revolt against the incorporation of the Indonesian federated "states" into the Republic of Indonesia. However, the uprising was quashed in a little over two weeks when troops under Lieutenant Colonel Suharto and Colonel Alexander Evert Kawilarang arrived at Makassar to find only light resistance.

The East Indonesian government refused to condone Aziz's actions and he was subsequently arrested in Jakarta on 14 April while attempting to negotiate with the republican authorities. The Makassar Uprising only facilitated republican control over the federal states.

== Background ==
Following the end of World War II in August 1945, the Dutch sought to re-establish control over the East Indies, modern-day Indonesia. While Australian and Dutch troops managed to occupy much of eastern Indonesia with minimal resistance, Anglo-Dutch forces in Java and Sumatra were challenged by nascent Republican nationalists advocating self-rule under Sukarno. The Republican goal of a unitary Republic of Indonesia centered on Java clashed with Dutch decolonization efforts to implement a system of federal states which was part of a Dutch commonwealth. Negotiations were dogged by skirmishes and the Police Actions.

In Sulawesi, resistance to Dutch rule was successfully suppressed by Captain Raymond Westerling, who drew controversy for his use of arbitrary terror tactics including rounding up villages and summarily executing members until they submitted information. However, the eradication of Republican forces paved the way for the establishment of a more amenable East Indonesian civil administration based in Makassar. In South Sulawesi, they also replaced more than a quarter of the pro-Republican local nobility including the Rajahs of Bone and Lawu, prompting the remaining rajahs to collaborate with the Dutch authorities.

In December 1948, the Dutch launched a second police action Operatie Kraai which succeeded in capturing much of Java and Sumatra as well as the Republican leadership in Yogyakarta. However, this action only fuelled opposition to the Dutch in the United Nations, the United States, Australia and India. The United States threatened to suspend Marshall Plan aid to the Dutch including funds vital for Dutch post-World War II rebuilding that had so far totalled $US 1 billion. The Netherlands Government had spent an amount equivalent to almost half of this funding their campaigns in Indonesia. On 24 December, the UN Security Council called for the end of hostilities. In January 1949, it passed a resolution demanding the reinstatement of the Republican government.

International pressure forced the Dutch to continue negotiations with the Republicans, culminating in the Dutch agreeing to recognise Indonesian sovereignty over a new federal state known as the United States of Indonesia (RUSI). It would include all the territory of the former Dutch East Indies with the exception of Netherlands New Guinea; sovereignty over which it was agreed would be retained by the Netherlands until further negotiations with Indonesia. Sovereignty was transferred on 27 December 1949. The new RUSI government consisted of both Republicans and Federalists but was short-lived due to animosity between the two parties and growing popular support for a unitary state.

On 23 January 1950, Westerling and the federalist Cabinet member Sultan Hamid II attempted to overthrow the Republican government by using Westerling's private Legion of the Just Ruler to launch simultaneous attacks on Bandung, Jakarta and Blora in the short-lived APRA Coup d'état. The coup failed since the majority of the KNIL leadership refused to support Westerling's actions and intercepted his munitions convoy. This only added fuel to public dissatisfaction with the federal system, leading to the integration of the states of Pasundan and West Kalimantan into the Republic of Indonesia by April 1950.

== The uprising ==
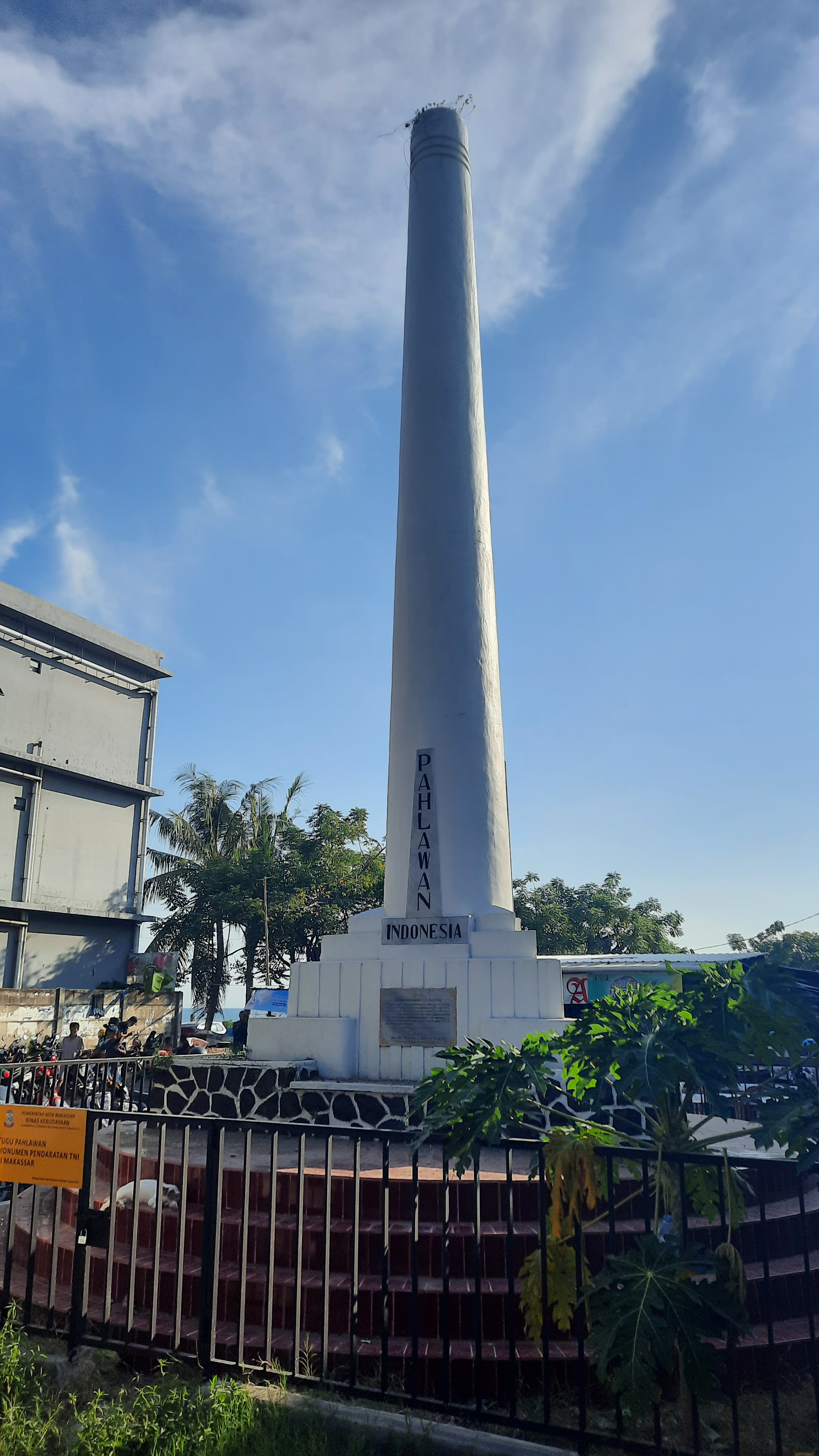
The monument erected by the Indonesian government to commemorate the landing of Indonesian troops to suppress the uprising

Due to the strong presence of KNIL troops in Sulawesi and other parts of East Indonesia, there was much suspicion towards the intentions of the unitary central government in Jakarta. Efforts were made to integrate the KNIL into the RUSI army, but this was impeded by mutual distrust between the predominantly Javanese Indonesian military and the largely Ambonese and Minahasan KNIL. In the State of East Indonesia, the Justice Minister Soumokil banned all public meetings and jailed pro-Republican leaders in response to public pro-Republic protests. On 5 April 1950, the Jakarta central government dispatched a force of 700 Republican troops under Colonel Sunkono and Colonel Mokoginto to persuade the East Indonesian President Soekawati to join the Republic and to step down. These troops were further augmented by 200 pro-Republican guerrillas in the Makassar region.

Fears that this deployment would shift the balance in favour of pro-Republican elements and lead to disorder prompted Soumokil and other pro-federal elements to convince the local KNIL forces to launch a coup. KNIL Captain Andi Aziz commanded a force of 350 KNIL troops in Makassar. At the urging of Soumokil, Aziz's force overwhelmed the few local Republican troops and their guerrilla allies before seizing control of the city. They then prevented the 700 RUSI reinforcements from landing by firing artillery at their troop transports, forcing them to retreat. Aziz defended his actions by claiming to uphold the Federal Constitution which guaranteed the autonomy of the federal states including East Indonesia. He also claimed that he had discovered documents alleging that Sukarno was collaborating with the Indonesian Communist Party and the Soviet Union to destroy the "capitalist and upper classes" and establish a unitary state, paving the way for a communist take-over.

However, most of the East Indonesian government including President Soekawati refused to condone or support his coup. By 13 April, President Sukarno had denounced Aziz's insurgency and deployed RUSI forces to crush the rebellion in South Sulawesi. Wanting to maintain working relations with the Jakarta government, Soekawati convinced Aziz to come to Jakarta to negotiate with Sukarno's government. He was also granted a safe-conduct pass by Sukarno and the United Nations Commission for Indonesia to fly to Jakarta. However upon arrival, he was arrested by the Sultan of Yogyakarta Hamengkubuwono IX who incarcerated him in his private prison. The capture of Aziz ended resistance and allowed 2,000 RUSI troops to swiftly occupy Makassar by 21 April.

== Aftermath ==
The elimination of the KNIL as a political actor allowed Republican factions in the East Indonesian parliament to assume a majority. The federalist Prime Minister Diapari was replaced by Martinus Putuhena, who declared martial law and established an Emergency Government in South Sulawesi which was controlled directly by Jakarta. Following the release of Republican political prisoners, guerrilla forces in the upland regions launched attacks against pro-Dutch aristocrats in the urban areas. This led to further fighting with the remaining KNIL units and the abolishment of local aristocratic principalities.

The new East Indonesian Cabinet was pro-Republican and advocated the integration of East Indonesia into the unitary Indonesian Republic. On 21 April 1950, President Soekawati successfully negotiated East Indonesia's integration, heeding majority support for a unitary state. This prompted all thirteen constituent territories within East Indonesia with the exception of South Moluccas to secede from East Indonesia and join Sukarno's Republic. Following further negotiations, the RUSI was dissolved on 15 August in favour of a unitary Republic of Indonesia. Due to his leading role in the uprising, Aziz was subsequently tried in 1952 and sentenced to 14 years imprisonment.

== Bibliography ==
- Kahin, George McTurnan (1952). Nationalism and Revolution in Indonesia. Ithaca, N.Y.: Cornell University Press. ISBN 0-87727-734-6.
- Palmer, Leslie H. (1962). Indonesia and the Dutch. London: Oxford University Press.
- Westerling, Raymond Paul Pierre (1952). Mes aventures en Indonesie (in French). – translated from the French to English by Waverley Root as – Challenge to terror. London: W. Kimber.
