= Operation 17 Agustus =

1958 Indonesian military operation

- Part of PRRI rebellion
Date	17 April – 24 May 1958 (1 month and 1 week)
Location	Padang, West Sumatera.
Result	Indonesian Government victory; Indonesian forces recaptured Pekanbaru, Padang, Pandan and Bukittinggi

Belligerents
Indonesia	(Indonesia) PRRI

Commanders and leaders
(Indonesia) Sukarno (Indonesia) Lt Gen. A.H Nasution (Indonesia) Col. Ahmad Yani	(Indonesia) Syafruddin Prawiranegara (Indonesia) Assaat Dt. Mudo (Indonesia) Col. Maludin Simbolon (Indonesia) Lt.Col. Ahmad Husein

Strength
6,500 Indonesian army, navy, air force personnel	Unknown

Casualties and losses
Unknown	+- 500 Soldiers surrendered

—

Operation 17 Agustus (Indonesian: Operasi 17 Agustus) was a military operation led by Colonel Ahmad Yani which aimed to crush the Revolutionary Government of the Republic of Indonesia (PRRI) movement in West Sumatra, specifically in Padang. This military operation is a joint operation involving the Indonesian Navy, Army and Air Force. "August 17" refers to the password used by Colonel Ahmad Yani.

The deployment of military force to crush PRRI's power was the largest ever recorded in Indonesian military history For three years, there was a civil war between the central army and PRRI troops which resulted in many PRRI casualties. The number of victims resulting from the short PRRI conflict was far greater than the victims of the war with the Dutch during the independence revolution. Apart from that, many were not involved in PRRI but were victims of violence such as torture, robbery, and rape.

== Background ==
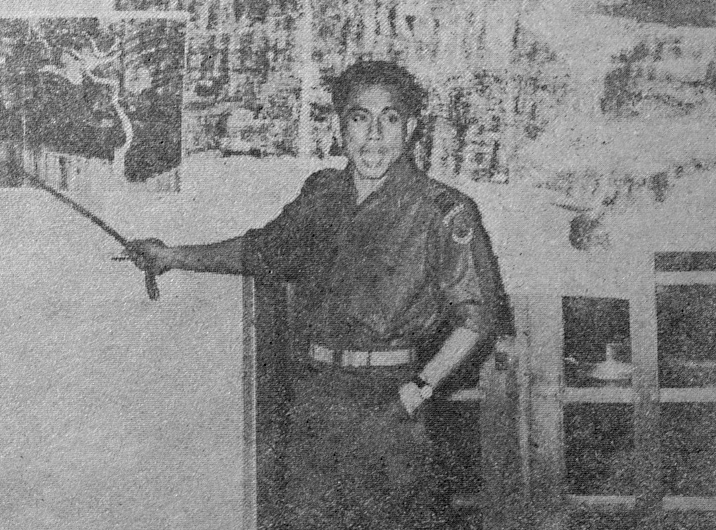
Col. Ahmad Yani leading a briefing on 12 April 1958 during Operation 17 August

PRRI is a movement carried out by regional governments towards the central government. This movement, which is considered a rebellion, was triggered by the local government's dissatisfaction in several cities in Sumatra regarding the central government's fund allocation policy as well as various disparities in development, especially in areas outside Java. This sense of dissatisfaction was also supported by several military commanders.

Because of this, the central government considers that this movement must be resolved immediately by force of arms. President Sukarno gave Ahmad Yani a mandate to carry out military operations to destroy the PRRI in West Sumatra. Ahmad Yani was also given the mandate to lead TNI troops in Padang.

== Chronology ==
April 17, 1958 was the day determined for the initial landing in Padang. At 05.00 – 06.00 WIB, shooting at the landing point was carried out by the Indonesian Navy. Then 25 minutes later, Indonesian Air Force troops using the "Red Flight" aircraft carried out shooting, followed by the "Blue Flight" aircraft. This shooting attack was aimed at Tabing airport.

Not long after, Indonesian marine troops landed via Padang Beach. In the afternoon, all joint forces successfully landed in Padang. This occupation operation lasted for one and a half months. As a result, the cities of Padang, Solok, Payakumbuh and Bukittinggi were successfully controlled by the TNI.

== Results ==
On May 24, 1958, 500 PRRI soldiers surrendered.
