= North Klaten =

Coordinates: 7.688623799999999°S 110.61391239999999°E

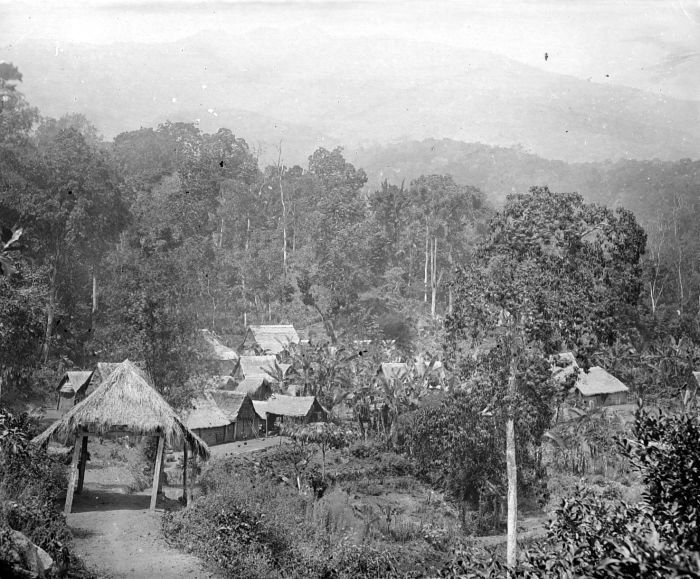
The village of Plembon

North Klaten is an administrative district (kecamatan) on Java, Indonesia. It is part of Klaten Regency in Central Java Province.
