= Karangnongko =

District in Klaten Regency, Jawa Tengah Province, Indonesia

Coordinates: 7°47′44″S 110°35′13″E

- District
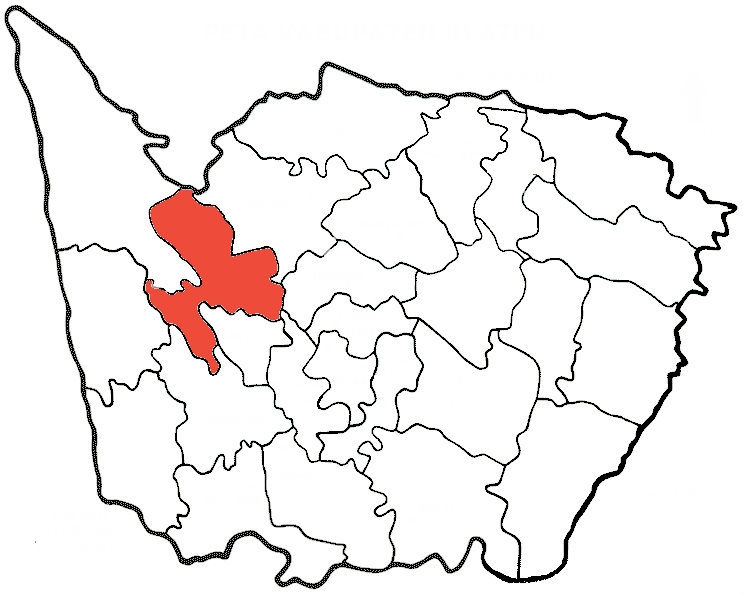
- Location of Karangnongko within Klaten Regency
- Interactive map of Karangnongko
- Country: Indonesia
- Province: Central Java
- Regency: Klaten
- Villages: 14

Area
  - Total: 29.49 km^{2} (11.39 sq mi)

Population
  - Total: 37,420
  - Density: 1,269/km^{2} (3,286/sq mi)

Karangnongko is an administrative district (kecamatan) in Indonesia. It is located in the Klaten Regency in Central Java Province, and had 37,420 inhabitants in 2023.
