= Klaten Regency =

Regency in Central Java, Indonesia

Klaten Klathèn ꦏ꧀ꦭꦛꦺꦤ꧀
- Regency
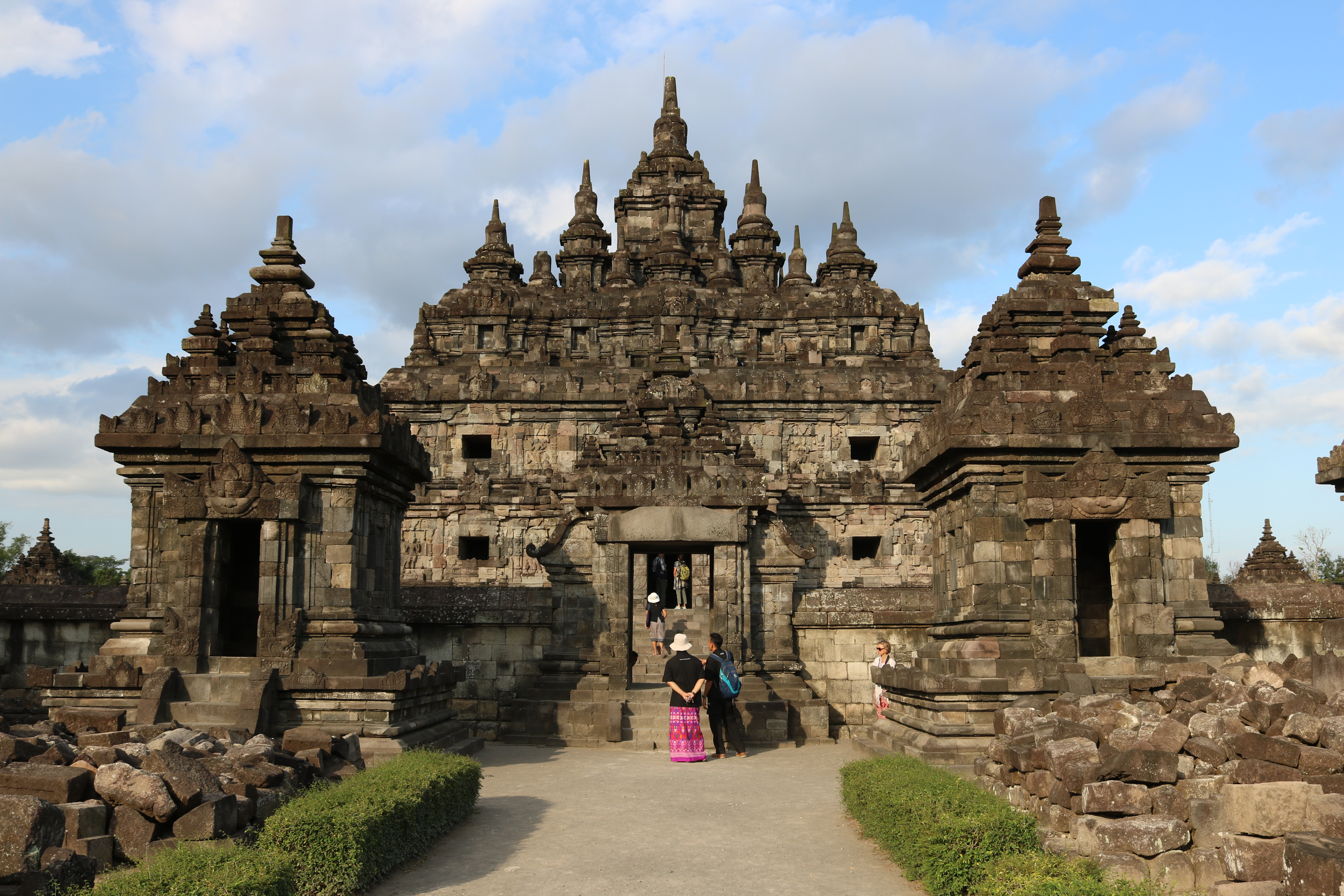
- North Plaosan Temple

- Coat of arms
- Motto(s): Tumenga Tata Anggatra Rahardja (Looking in harmony, building prosperity)
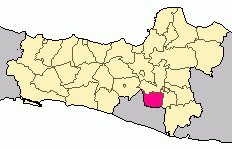
- Location within Central Java

- Location of Klaten in Indonesia Location of Klaten on Java
- Coordinates: 7°38′56″S 110°38′9″E
- Country: Indonesia
- Province: Central Java

Government
  - Regent: Hamenang Wajar Ismoyo
  - Vice Regent: vacant

Area
  - Total: 701.52 km^{2} (270.86 sq mi)

Population (mid 2025 estimate)
  - Total: 1,304,428
  - Density: 1,859.4/km^{2} (4,815.9/sq mi)
- Time zone: UTC+7 (WIB)
- Area code: 0272
- Website: klatenkab.go.id

Klaten (Indonesian: Klaten, pronounced [ˈklat̪ɛn]; Javanese: Klathèn) is a regency (kabupaten) in the Indonesian province of Central Java. Klaten is situated between the two major cities of Yogyakarta to its Southwest and Surakarta (colloquially known as Solo) to its Northeast. It covers an area of 701 km^{2} (271 sq mi) and as of 2025 has an estimated population of 1,304,428 (comprising 648,387 males and 656,081 females).

The regency encompasses parts of Mount Merapi, Indonesia's most active volcano, whose eruptions have repeatedly affected Klaten's population. Klaten is home to several historical sites, including the 9th-century Buddhist Plaosan temple complex. The 9th-century Hindu Prambanan temple itself sits just outside the administrative border of Klaten, but large portions of the wider Prambanan Temple Compounds, a World Heritage Site that includes several more Hindu-Buddhist temple complexes in the vicinity of Prambanan, lie within Klaten regency.

The regency's administrative centre is the town of the same name; which extends over 37 km^{2} (14 sq mi) and encompasses three of the regency's districts, with a combined total of 136,400 inhabitants in 2025; a fourth district (Kalikotes, with 38,786 inhabitants in 2025) is also part of the town area.

== Geography and Climate ==
=== Geography ===
Klaten Regency borders Boyolali Regency in the North, Sukoharjo Regency and Wonogiri Regency in the East, and the Special Region of Yogyakarta to the South and West.

The 2006 Yogyakarta earthquake damaged the area, located near the active Mount Merapi volcano on the border between Central Java and the Special Region of Yogyakarta, The 2010 eruptions of Mount Merapi had a great impact on Klaten and its surrounding areas. A few of the victims who were affected by the eruption came from the regency of Klaten. The volcanic eruptions were so loud they caused panic and a rush for residents to seek refuge.

Klaten has a humid (> 0.65 p/pet) climate. The landscape is mostly covered with rainfed croplands, residential areas, and isolated stands of trees. The climate is classified as a Tropical Monsoon (short dry season, monsoon rains other months), with a tropical moist forest biozone. The soil in the area is high in nitosols, and andosols (nt), soil with deep, clay-enriched lower horizon with shiny ped surfaces.

=== Climate ===
Klaten has a tropical monsoon climate (Am) according to the Köppen climate classification. The average temperature varies little from month to month. October is the warmest with an average temperature of 26.5 °C. July is coldest with an average temperature of 24.8 °C. The wet season has a rainfall peak around January. The dry season centers around August, which has the most sunshine.

Climate data for Klaten
Month	Jan	Feb	Mar	Apr	May	Jun	Jul	Aug	Sep	Oct	Nov	Dec	Year
Mean daily maximum °C (°F)	28.9 (84.0)	29.1 (84.4)	29.5 (85.1)	30.5 (86.9)	30.2 (86.4)	30.2 (86.4)	29.6 (85.3)	30.4 (86.7)	30.8 (87.4)	31.2 (88.2)	30.1 (86.2)	29.5 (85.1)	30.0 (86.0)
Daily mean °C (°F)	25.4 (77.7)	25.5 (77.9)	25.8 (78.4)	26.3 (79.3)	26.0 (78.8)	25.5 (77.9)	24.8 (76.6)	25.3 (77.5)	26.0 (78.8)	26.5 (79.7)	26.0 (78.8)	25.8 (78.4)	25.7 (78.3)
Mean daily minimum °C (°F)	22.0 (71.6)	22.0 (71.6)	22.1 (71.8)	22.1 (71.8)	21.8 (71.2)	20.8 (69.4)	20.1 (68.2)	20.2 (68.4)	21.3 (70.3)	21.9 (71.4)	22.0 (71.6)	22.1 (71.8)	21.5 (70.8)
Average rainfall mm (inches)	307 (12.1)	292 (11.5)	267 (10.5)	196 (7.7)	127 (5.0)	79 (3.1)	35 (1.4)	34 (1.3)	30 (1.2)	91 (3.6)	195 (7.7)	249 (9.8)	1,902 (74.9)
Source: Climate-Data.org

== Administrative ==
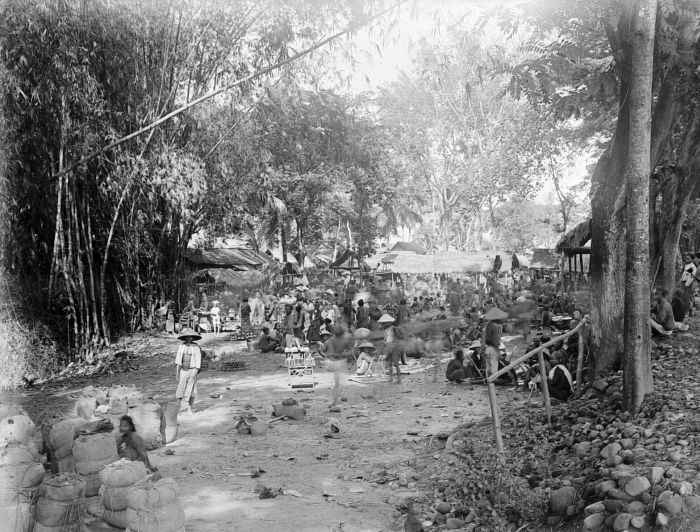
Market in Klaten during the Dutch colonial period.

The regency government of Klaten was established on 28 October 1950. Its 26 districts (kecamatan) are subdivided into 391 rural villages (desa) and 10 urban villages (kelurahan). The area includes tourist sites, places of interest, traditional arts, traditional events, and handicraft centers.

== Administrative districts ==
Klaten Regency is divided into twenty-six districts (kecamatan), tabulated below with their areas and their populations at the 2010 Census and the 2020 Census, together with the official estimates as of mid 2025. The table also includes the locations of the district administrative centres, the number of administrative villages in each district (totaling 391 rural desa and 10 urban kelurahan), and its postcode.

Kode Wilayah	Name of District (kecamatan)	Area in km^{2}	Pop'n Census 2010	Pop'n Census 2020	Pop'n Estimate mid 2025	Admin centre	No. of villages	Post code
33.10.01	Prambanan	26.09	46,262	52,592	53,389	Prambanan	16	57454
33.10.02	Gantiwarno	26.44	33,735	38,144	39,102	Gantiwarno	16	57455
33.10.03	Wedi	26.26	46,527	51,442	52,673	Wedi	19	57461
33.10.04	Bayat	42.10	52,718	61,191	64,705	Bayat	18	57462
33.10.05	Cawas	35.94	49,840	56,101	58,378	Cawas	20	57463
33.10.06	Trucuk	34.69	69,022	77,206	81,096	Trucuk	18	57467 ^{(a)}
33.10.07	Kebonarum	10.42	17,638	19,289	19,941	Kebonarum	7	57486
33.10.08	Jogonalan	27.59	52,688	59,628	60,090	Jogonalan	18	57452
33.10.09	Manisrenggo	30.60	38,097	43,242	44,511	Manisrenggo	16	57485
33.10.10	Karangnongko	29.49	32,132	36,304	37,778	Karangnongko	14	57483
33.10.11	Ceper	25.77	57,958	64,305	66,256	Ceper	18	57465
33.10.12	Pedan	20.00	42,164	46,942	48,000	Pedan	14	57468
33.10.13	Karangdowo	30.83	38,117	42,515	43,806	Karangdowo	19	57464
33.10.14	JuwiringJuwiring, Klaten	30.90	53,087	57,764	59,507	Juwiring	19	57472
33.10.15	Wonosari	25.62	56,903	62,115	64,511	Bayat	18	57473
33.10.16	Delanggu	20.03	38,911	41,041	42,663	Delanggu	16	57471
33.10.17	Polanharjo	25.22	36,058	40,065	41,391	Polanharjo	18	57474
33.10.18	Karanganom	25.62	40,312	45,219	47,597	Karanganom	19	57475
33.10.19	Tulung	34.44	44,974	51,850	55,376	Tulung	18	57482
33.10.20	Jatinom	37.12	52,249	58,953	62,258	Jatinom	18 ^{(b)}	57481
33.10.21	Kemalang	60.19	34,006	38,547	40,889	Kemalang	13	57484
33.10.22	Ngawen	18.45	39,946	45,235	46,325	Ngawen	13	57466
33.10.23	Kalikotes	14.11	32,316	37,051	37,786	Kalikotes	7	57451
33.10.24	Klaten Utara (North Klaten)	11.17	44,266	49,028	49,129	Klaten Utara	8 ^{(c)}	57432: 57438
33.10.25	Klaten Tengah (Central Klaten)	10.62	39,522	40,421	41,701	Klaten Tengah	9 ^{(d)}	57411: 57419
33.10.26	Klaten Selatan (South Klaten)	15.09	40,699	44,316	45,570	Klaten Selatan	12 ^{(e)}	57421: 57426
	Totals	701.52	1,130,047	1,260,506	1,304,428	Klaten	401	

Notes: (a) except the desa of Wonosari (which has a postcode of 57473). (b) including kelurahan of Jatinom. (c) including 2 kelurahan of Bareng Lor and Gergunung.
(d) including 6 kelurahan of Bareng, Buntalan, Kabupaten, Klaten, Mojayan and Tonggalan. (e) including kelurahan of Gayamprit.

== Klaten town ==
The three districts which together form Klaten town are divided into the following twenty-nine villages (comprising nine urban kelurahan and twenty rural desa), while the urban area also includes Kalikotes District, composed of a further seven villages (all classed as rural desa). These are tabulated below with their areas and their populations according to the 2023 official estimates, together with their postcodes. Kelurahan are noted by an asterisk following their names.

District (kecamatan)	Kode Wilayah	Name	Area (km^{2})	Pop'n Estimate end 2023	Post code
Kalikotes	33.10.23.2001	Jimbung	4.57	11,355	57451
Kalikotes	33.10.23.2002	Ngemplak	1.99	3,752	57451
Kalikotes	33.10.23.2003	Kalikotes	1.69	4,853	57451
Kalikotes	33.10.23.2004	Krajan	1.11	2,901	57451
Kalikotes	33.10.23.2005	Tambongwetan	1.34	3,950	57451
Kalikotes	33.10.23.2006	Jogosetran	1.53	4,411	57451
Kalikotes	33.10.23.2007	Gemblegan	1.89	6,387	57451
North Klaten	33.10.24.2001	Sekarsuli	1.03	2,873	57432
North Klaten	33.10.24.1002	Barenglor *	0.93	5,730	57438
North Klaten	33.10.24.2003	Karanganom	2.38	10,587	57438
North Klaten	33.10.24.2004	Ketandan	1.23	4,063	57437
North Klaten	33.10.24.2005	Belangwetan	1.88	8,753	57438
North Klaten	33.10.24.2006	Jonggrangan	1.03	4,238	57435
North Klaten	33.10.24.1007	Gergunung *	1.47	8,025	57434
North Klaten	33.10.24.2008	Jebugan	1.21	4,634	57433
Central Klaten	33.10.25.1001	Bareng *	1.53	4,706	57414
Central Klaten	33.10.25.1002	Kabupaten *	0.53	3,611	57413
Central Klaten	33.10.25.1003	Klaten * (village)	0.53	3,815	57411
Central Klaten	33.10.25.1004	Tonggalan *	0.56	4,117	57412
Central Klaten	33.10.25.2005	Semangkak	0.70	2,918	57415
Central Klaten	33.10.25.1006	Buntalan *	1.53	3.950	57419
Central Klaten	33.10.25.2007	Jomboran	2.07	5,243	57418
Central Klaten	33.10.25.1008	Mojayan *	1.45	6,592	57416
Central Klaten	33.10.25.2009	Gumalan	1.72	6,704	57417
South Klaten	33.10.26.2001	Kajoran	0.96	3,162	57426
South Klaten	33.10.26.2002	Glodogan	1.59	5,133	57426
South Klaten	33.10.26.2003	Ngalas	1.37	3,357	57425
South Klaten	33.10.26.2004	Danguran	1.78	5,977	57425
South Klaten	33.10.26.2005	Trunuh	1.16	3,600	57421
South Klaten	33.10.26.2006	Sumberejo	1.31	3,720	57426
South Klaten	33.10.26.2007	Merbung	0.91	3,672	57424
South Klaten	33.10.26.2008	Tegalyoso	1.05	3,410	57424
South Klaten	33.10.26.1009	Gayamprit *	0.86	4,409	57423
South Klaten	33.10.26.2010	Karanglo	1.83	3,677	57423
South Klaten	33.10.26.2011	Nglinggi	1.21	2,225	57422
South Klaten	33.10.26.2012	Jetis	1.07	2,520	57421

The metropolitan area of the town had 384,896 inhabitants at the 1990 Census.
