= Tangse =

- District
- Interactive map of Tangse
- Coordinates: 5.00935°N 95.910629°E
- Country: Indonesia
- Province: Aceh
- Regency: Pidie
- Time zone: UTC+7 (WIB)
- Postal Code: 24166

Tangse is an administrative district (kecamatan) in Pidie Regency, Aceh, Indonesia.
