= Bambu Runtjing =

Anti-government militia in Indonesia

- Founding leader: Chairul Saleh (POW)
- Founded: 1947
- Dates active: 1947–1959
- Active regions: West Java and Jakarta
- Ideology: National communism Murbaism
- Political position: Far-left

Bambu Runtjing or Bambu Runcing – was a national communist militia active in Indonesia from 1947 to 1959. It formed out of the Greater Jakarta People's Militia.

== History ==
Formed during the Indonesian National Revolution, the militia derived its named from bamboo spears it initially used to fight. Following independence of Indonesia's the group continued fighting believing the result to be unfair. Its first leader was Khaerul Saleh, operating in the central part of West Java. The group would sometimes work together or fight against Darul Islam.

By 1949, Bambu Runcing had become closely associated with the political followers of Tan Malaka. A group of twenty Tan Malaka supporters and former members of the Greater Jakarta People's Militia, led by Chairul Saleh, joined the organization at Mount Sanggabuana, and Saleh subsequently assumed its leadership. After the group moved to South Banten, it was reorganized as the Tentara Rakyat. According to academian Suharto, it was formed as a continuation of the political ideas associated with Tan Malaka and the Persatuan Perjuangan.

Siliwangi Division forces under Major Sudarsono attacked the group in November 1949 and dispersed them before they could reach the coast. Chairul Saleh was arrested on 4 November away from the battle, Syamsuddin Can and Muhidin Nasution were also later arrested. Manglep returned to his old haunts along the lower reaches of the Citarum but was killed soon after in a clash with the army. Sidik Samsi and Camat Nata survived and moved once more in the foothills of the Mount Sanggabuana. Their troops were active for a time in the countryside of Karawang. Subsequent military operations reduced the strength of the group with multiple local commanders killed.

Following the South Banten affair, Saleh remained imprisoned until 1952. He was held successively at Paledang Prison in Bogor and several other detention facilities before being transferred to Nusakambangan. In 1952, with the intervention of Minister of Justice Muhammad Yamin, Saleh was released, granted amnesty, and left Indonesia to continue his studies in West Germany. He then returned to Indonesia in 1956 and later became part of the Djuanda Cabinet in veteran affairs.

In March 1954 Camat Nata responded to official amnesty and surrendered in Cibitung with only a few small Bambu Runtjing units under Tjetje Subrata south of Sukabumi and Haji Usman Debot in the limestone hills around Cibinong continuing to fight.

On 4 January 1956, Tadjudin a regional commander of Bambu Runtjing was killed in a clash near the Tanjnung military post, around one year after Tjetje Subrata was killed. In 1959 Debot descended from the mountains following Sukharno's restoration of the 1950 constitution.
