= Tjitarum Brigade =

Pro-government militia in Indonesia

- Brigade Tjitarum
- Leader: Tjetje Subrata †
- Dates active: 1949–1955
- Active regions: West Java
- Size: 200 (1950)

Tjitarum Brigade or Citarum Brigade – was a communist militia active in Indonesia from 1949 to 1955.

== History ==
=== 1949 ===
In late October 1949 ten Tjitarum Brigade members were killed and 17 captured in a firefight with a Dutch patrol which took place on the slopes of the Pangerango, south of Buitenzorg.

=== 1951 ===
In November 1951 TNI carried out an operation against the Tjitarum Brigade in Jampang, Sukabumi, killing the battalion commander and capturing the other commander. Due to the operation, about 87 of the Tjitarum Brigade members surrendered.

=== 1952 ===
On 9 March 1952 Tjitarum Brigade killed the mosque official in Cikukut, Purabaja, Sukabumi. On 21 March the leader of the Tjitarum Brigade, Adang Komar, was captured in Ciracap, Sukabumi Regency. In mid-April Tjitarum Brigade shot to death a member of the village youth organization in Cipenduy, Jampang Kulon and attacked Cimega, killing a police officer. In early June, police and army tried to arrest a suspected member of the Tjitarum Brigade near Cibadak. However, the suspect was killed when he attempted to flee. In early October, Battalion 307 of TNI captured two members of Tjitarum Brigade, Rubin and Damanhuri alias Dono, in Cibenda, Sukabumi.

=== 1953 ===
On 27 August 1953 a clash broke out between security forces and Tjitarum Brigade in Jampang Tengah, Sukabumi, killing one TB member. In September Tjitarum Brigade killed a teacher of sekolah rakjat (elementary school) in Sukabumi. The group also robbed bus and truck near Pasar Piring, Sukabumi.

On 21 December TNI and village guards patrol arrested Tete, a member of Tjitarum Brigade, near Paraluburilima, Cikembar, Cibadak, Sukabumi. He later died when he tried to escape. On 22 December a leader of Tjitarum Brigade, Djadja Karson, was arrested by locals and village guards in Cimerang, Jampang Tengah. However, he died because he tried to escape. Upon his death, his body was transferred to the nearest military post. On the same day the locals captured one of the leaders of Tjitarum Brigade, Ukon and his men, Sarkowi, in Bantarsari, Lengkong, Jampang Kulon. In late December an Army and village guard arrested a Tjitarum Brigade member in Purabaya, Jampang Tengah, Sukabumi. Later, he tried to escape and the security forces opened fire toward him, causing him to die. The group also robbed rice in Kubang, Bojonggatal, Sukabumi and jewerly in Leuwitceuri.

=== 1954 ===
In early February TNI soldiers, police, and village guards engaged in a clash against Tjitarum Brigade in Jampang Kulon, killing one gang member. On 23 February village guards and locals of Cipari, Cihenda, Cicemas District, Sukabumi captured two members of Tjitarum Brigade, Didi bin Handi and Odjeh bin Achmad. Afterwards, they handed over those two gang members to Battalion 311. Three days later, they were shot to death as they tried to escape from detention.

In early March 1954 ten members of Tjitarum Brigade surrendered to the police in Nyalindung, Sukabumi. In mid-March Battalion 311 discovered Tjitarum Brigade’s hideout near Pasir Ciwalet in Sagaranten, Sukabumi. On 24 March locals of Lengkong, Jampang Kulon, Sukabumi encountered two Tjitarum Brigade members. They managed to kill one member after he tried to escape while the rest fled when he was discovered.

On 22 May TNI forces and police engaged in a clash against Tjitarum Brigade under the leadership of Tjetje Subrata in Cilangsana forest, Jampang Tengah, Sukabumi. During the clash, two gangs were killed and about 150 bamboo huts were burned.

On 11 July forty members of Tjitarum Brigade surrendered themselves to village guard Begawat, Bojong Jengkol. In late July Tjitarum Brigade under the command of Samsi attacked a village guard post in Cicurug, Pasir Ipis, killing two village guards and burned two houses. The group also destroyed the mosque and seven houses in Cimangu.

On 23 August, Battalion 311 ambushed Tjitarum Brigade led by Amat Maulani in the forest of Ciangsana near Tegalbuleud, Sagaranten. During the battle, two Tjitarum Brigade gangs were killed and TNI soldiers burned 24 huts. On 25 August Battalion 311, Mobile Guards, and Village Guards conducted an operation against the Tjitarum Brigade in Bukit Cihaur near Cibitung, Ciracap, Jampang Kulon, killing four TB members. The operation led the Tjitarum Brigade to flee.

In November police discovered the Tjitarum Brigade hideout under the command of Pepe Sardjono in the Cikidang forest, Sukabumi. A clash between police and gang soon broke out, causing the gang to flee and the police to burn six huts. On 20 November, the Tjitarum Brigade attacked Tangkole and Sukatengah, Jampang Kulon, Sukabumi. During the attack, they burned 28 houses and killed two people.

=== 1955 ===
In January 1955, TNI soldiers killed three Tjitarum Brigade members during a clash in Karangbolong forest, Sukabumi. Tjetje Subrata was killed early in that year.

In early April, joint TNI and village guard forces attacked Tjitarum Brigade led by Pepe, alias Sardjono, in the Cikupa forest, Sukabumi. Tjitarum Brigade killed two villagers of Jagamukti, Sukabumi. On 7 April police and Battalion 329 clashed with 16 Tjitarum Brigade under the command of Djenas near Cikupa, Jampang Kulon, Sukabumi. The clash resulted in the death of 1 TB member. On 22 April Tjitarum Brigade looted a villager's belongings in Cikaret, Cibitung, Ciracap. On 7 May a clash between the TNI and village guard occurred in Ciawi, Jampang Kulon. During the clash, one soldier and village guard personnel were killed.
