= Andi Aziz =

Royal Dutch East Indies Army captain

- Born: 19 September 1924; Simpangbinangal, Barru, Celebes, Dutch East Indies
- Died: 30 January 1984 (aged 59); Jakarta, Indonesia
- Military career
- Allegiance: Netherlands
- Branch: Royal Dutch East Indies Army (KNIL)
- Rank: Captain
- Conflicts: Indonesian National Revolution: Makassar Uprising

Andi Abdul Azis or Andi Aziz (19 September 1924 – 30 January 1984) was a Royal Dutch East Indies Army captain. He was born in Simpangbinangal, Barru, South Sulawesi. He led the 5 April 1950 Makassar Uprising in Sulawesi against the Republic of the United States of Indonesia government. The purpose of the uprising was to revolt against the incorporation of the Indonesian federated "states" into the Indonesian Republic. The uprising was quashed, however, after two weeks when troops under Lt. Col. Suharto and Col. Alexander Evert Kawilarang arrived at Makassar only to find light resistance. Aziz was ordered by the army to return to Jakarta and was promptly arrested on arrival.
