= 426 Battalion rebellion =

Part of the Darul Islam rebellion (1951–1952)

- Part of the Darul Islam rebellion
Date	8 December 1951 – 9 May 1952
Location	Central Java
Result	Government victory; Rebellion suppressed; The remaining rebels joined DI/TII and armed groups in the Merapi Merbabu Complex

Belligerents
Indonesia; TNI; POLRI	Battalion 426; Supported by: Darul Islam

Commanders and leaders
(Indonesia) Gatot Soebroto (Indonesia) Suharto (Indonesia) Ahmad Yani (Indonesia) M. Sarbini (Indonesia) Katamso Darmokusumo (Indonesia) Moch. Bachrun (Indonesia) Kusmanto † (Indonesia) Sunaryo †	Sofjan †; Alif (surrendered); Sonhaji †; Muhyidin; Yuslam; A.G Ismail

Units involved
Diponegoro Division; Mobile Brigade Corps	Company I Company II; Company III; Company IV

Strength
	1,000 (December 1951); 400 (January 1952); 125 (May 1952)

The 426 Battalion rebellion (Indonesian: Pemberontakan Batalyon 426), also known as the ex-426 Battalion rebellion, was a conflict that occurred from 8 December 1951 to 9 April 1952 between the Indonesian government and the 426 Battalion which was supported by Darul Islam.

== Background ==
426 Battalion personnel consisted of former members of Hizbullah and Sabilillah in Surakarta. These former Hizbullah members sympathized with the Darul Islam movement. They helped the DI/TII movement by supplying weapons when they were stationed in Demak and involved in the operation to eradicate the disruptive troops at the Merapi Merbabu Complex. Hurt by being merged into the Pragolo Brigade and receiving discriminatory treatment because of the Hizbullah origins, 426 Battalion decided to rebel with the support of DI/TII.

Hearing of 426 Battalion's support for the Darul Islam movement, Major Munawar and Captain Sofjan received orders to go to the Diponegoro Division headquarters for an inspection on December 7, 1951. Only Major Munawar came to the headquarters while Captain Sofjan refused. Captain Sofjan admitted that three of his companies had joined Darul Islam.

== Rebellion ==
=== December 1951 ===
The rebellion erupted on December 8, 1951, marked by fighting between former 426 Battalion troops and the Indonesian soldiers in Kudus in response to Captain Sofjan's refusal to surrender. The fighting lasted until the afternoon due to the heavy rain. Taking advantage of this condition, the former 426 Battalion troops secretly fled from Kudus. One company fled to Mount Muria while the other two headed southeast of Kudus towards their base area, Surakarta. In response to the rebellion, the government arrested 75 people who were suspected of having close ties to the rebels.

Meanwhile, two companies of 426 Battalion led by Captain Alif who were undergoing training in Magelang escaped from the Dodik dormitory to the south in the early hours of December 10 by disguising as ordinary residents. Then, each company was assigned to go to a different place. One company led by Muhyiddin fled to the south while the company led by Captain Alif went north. While fleeing, Muhyiddin's troops attacked the Muntilan police station and freed 11 prisoners who were then armed. As a result of this incident, access to Magelang was closed, causing the city to become deserted and a curfew was implemented. On the other hand, Major Munawar, who was wearing thug-like clothes, was captured in Klaten on December 10, 1951.

Troops from the former 426 Battalion led by Captain Alif arrived in Klaten on December 15, 1951, after passing through various areas. Upon arrival in Klaten, they built defensive ditches in Ngupit,Trucuk, and Cawas. From 16 to 20 December 1951, troops from former 426 Battalion attacked Delanggu and Karanganom. The fighting lasted for four days and one of the police officers, Sudomo, died. An armed confrontation between former 426 Battalion troops and the TNI also occurred in Ngupit and killed Major Kusmanto. As a result of this rebellion, the Klaten government imposed a curfew from 8 PM to 5 AM.

In mid-December 1951, former 426 Battalion troops operated in the Semarang, Purwodadi-Grobogan, Salatiga, Kedu Residency, Yogyakarta-Purworejo and Surakarta areas. They also tried to enter East Java via Ngawi. However, their efforts were thwarted by the TNI.

Meanwhile, troops from the former 426 Battalion led by Captain Sofjan continued to move. From mid to late December, Sofjan and his troops moved from Purwodadi, Purwodadi, Grobogan, Purwodadi to Klaten to meet up with his colleagues, passing through several areas in Central Java and East Java. While stopping in Wonogiri, Sofjan succeeded in recruiting local youth by naming his troops the Tax Liberation Army. Captain Sofjan's troops arrived in Klaten four weeks after the outbreak of the rebellion.

To quell the rebellion of ex-426 Battalion troops, the Diponegoro Division launched Operation Sapta Marga Merdeka Timur V led by Mochammad Bachrun on 19 December 1951. Yon 421, Yon 422, Yon 424, Yon 425, Yon 408, Yon 417, Yon 413, Yon 414 and Yon 446 were included in this military operation. Apart from that, joint army-police forces also carried out cleaning activities in the area of Klaten and surrounding areas.

=== January 1952 ===
In January 1952, the strength of the former 426 Battalion was weakened as a result of the TNI's pursuit which caused their troops to be scattered. They damaged roads and burned residents' houses in the Klaten area. Jatinom District was the area worst affected by this rebellion. The leader of the rebellion, Captain Sofjan, was killed on 2 January and then Sonhaji on 5 January. Both were buried in the Wonogiri area. After the death of Captain Sofjan, leadership of the former 426 Battalion troops was handed over to Major A.G Ismail.

In mid-January 1952, former 426 Battalion troops operated in three areas, namely Klaten, Boyolali and Kedu. In Boyolali, rebel troops succeeded in controlling the Simo District while in Klaten the rebels succeeded in killing Major Sunaryo during a battle in Juwiring on January 5, 1952. Apart from that, the government also arrested religious leaders in Kauman, Surakarta on January 2, 1952, and imposed a state of emergency in the Surakarta area on January 1, 1952.

=== February 1952 ===
The TNI continued to pursue rebel forces in February. The TNI succeeded in capturing Simo, and this caused the former 426 Battalion's troops to spread to various areas in Boyolali. They had to hide in a rural area in Boyolali. The burning of residents' houses by former 426 Battalion's troops occurred in February in five villages in Nogosari and Temon.

In Klaten and Kedu, fighting between former 426 Battalion troops and the TNI also occurred. For the Klaten area, fighting took place in Pedan, Trucuk, and Cawas. In Bendungan, Wonosobo Captain Alif and 100 of his troops were captured by the TNI after fleeing when told to show them where their weapons were hidden.

=== March-May 1952 ===
Entering March 1952, the movement of ex-426 Battalion troops became increasingly squeezed. They experienced logistical problems because the local population was reluctant to assist the rebel forces. As a result, they chose to rob to survive. Even so, a hundred rebel troops managed to regain control of Simo.

On April 6, 1952, former 426 Battalion troops fled from Surakarta to Kaliurang to join DI/TII troops in the Central Java region. However, they were heavily attacked by TNI troops and tried to escape into the area of the National Bull Movement (GBN). Rebel troops only managed to enter the GBN area on May 3.

== Aftermath ==
The rebellion was declared over on May 9, 1952, after 125 rebels joined the DI/TII group led by Jamil. The rest of the 426 Battalion joined the armed group in Merapi Merbabu Complex and DI/TII troops in the Brebes and Pekalongan areas or tried to join DI/TII troops in West Java.

== Bibliography ==
- Kodam VII/Diponegoro, Kodam VII/Diponegoro (1968). Sedjarah TNI-AD Kodam VII/Diponegoro. Semarang: Jajasan Penerbit Diponegoro.
- Nugroho, Agung (2020). "Darul Islam Di Surakarta: Studi Kasus Pemberontakan DI/TII Eks-Batalion 426 Dan Pengaruhnya Tahun 1951-1952". Al-Isnad. 1 (1): 5.
- Pornomo, Eko Loren Ardiansah (2016). "Gerakan DI/TII di Jawa Tengah: Pemberontakan Eks Batalyon 426 dan Pengaruhnya terhadap Kehidupan Masyarakat di Klaten Tahun 1950-1952". Ilmu Sejarah - S1. 2 (1).
- van Dijk, Cornelis (1981). Rebellion under the Banner of Islam: The Darul Islam in Indonesia. The Hague: Martinus Nijhoff.
