= Merapi-Merbabu Complex =

Anti-government militia in Indonesia

- Leaders: Suradi Bledheg †; Sujud †; Umar Junani †
- Dates active: 1950–1956
- Active regions: Central Java, Indonesia

Merapi-Merbabu Complex – was an insurgent group active in Indonesia from 1950 to 1956.

== History ==
The group was active mainly on the slopes of the Mount Merapi and Mount Merbabu. Originating during the war of independence the group had links to the Communist Party of Indonesia.

On 1 April 1951 MMC leader, Suradi Bledheg, was killed in a firefight in the Brintik village by the Indonesian forces.

On 27 December 1954 gang leader Sujud Kridosardjono was killed by Indonesian army in the village of Tjipakung. Another gang member was also killed and multiple were arrested including his wife and children of the group.

In May 1955 it was reported that following arrests and killings of multiple leaders the gang was down to 50 members with only 3/4 of them armed. On 2 June 1955 inhabitants of the Bnlitengan village noticed five rebels passing through, they beat them up to death, one of them turned out to be Umar Junani. Authorities managed to find more than a dozen guns in a rebel hideout revealed by insurgents before their deaths. On 9 April 1956 a group of four MMC insurgents, including a commander named Gondoprajitno, carrying a rifle and 30 bullets surrendered to the army post.
