= Ahmad Yani =

Chief of Staff of the Indonesian Army (1962 – 1965)

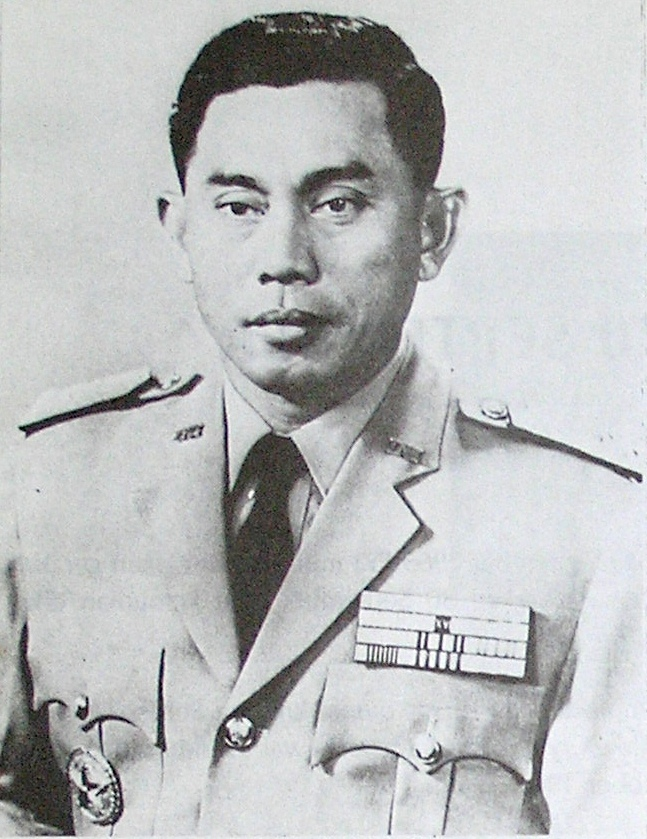

Minister/Commander of the Army of the Republic of Indonesia
- In office 23 June 1962 – 1 October 1965
- President: Sukarno
- Chief of Staff of the Armed Forces: Abdul Haris Nasution
- Preceded by: Abdul Haris Nasution
- Succeeded by: Pranoto Reksosamudro

Personal details
- Born: 19 June 1922 Jenar, Purworejo, Central Java, Dutch East Indies
- Died: 1 October 1965 (aged 43) Jakarta, Indonesia
- Resting place: Kalibata Heroes' Cemetery
- Spouse: Yayu Rulia Sutowiryo (m. 1944)
- Children: 8
- Awards: National Hero of Indonesia (1965)
- Nickname: Jansen (Note: The code used by Cakrabirawa during the September 30th Movement)

Military service
- Allegiance: Empire of Japan (1943–1945); Indonesia (1945–1965)
- Branch/service: PETA; Indonesian Army
- Years of service: 1943–1965
- Battles/wars: Indonesian National Revolution; General Offensive of 1 March 1949; Battle of Ambarawa; Darul Islam Rebellion; 426 Battalion rebellion; PRRI Rebellion; Operation 17 Agustus; Operation Trikora; Indonesia-Malaysia Confrontation

Ahmad Yani (19 June 1922 – 1 October 1965) was the Minister/Commander of the Army (Indonesian: Menteri/Panglima Angkatan Darat), a position equivalent to the modern Chief of Staff of Indonesian Army who was killed by members of the 30 September Movement during an attempt to kidnap him from his house.

== Early life ==
Ahmad Yani was born in Jenar, Purworejo, Dutch East Indies on 19 June 1922 to the Wongsoredjo family that worked at a sugar factory run by a Dutch owner. In 1927, Yani moved with his family to Batavia, where his father worked for a Dutch general. There, Yani finished his primary education, leaving high school in 1940 to undergo compulsory military service in the colonial Army of the Dutch East Indies, initially training as a navy seaman. He studied military topography in Malang, East Java, but this was interrupted by the Japanese invasion in 1942, forcing Yani and his family back to Central Java.

In 1943, he joined the Japanese-sponsored PETA army, and underwent further training in Magelang as an artillery officer and then as a platoon commander; he moved to Bogor, West Java for the latter, after which he returned to Magelang as an instructor.

== Indonesian military career ==
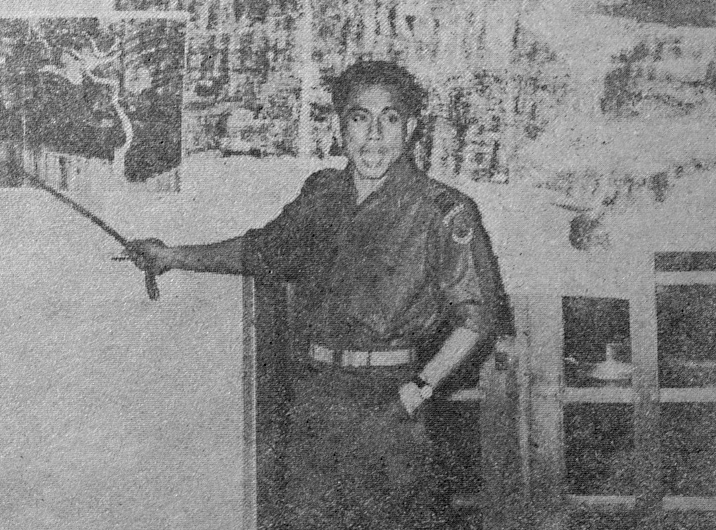
Then-Col. Yani leading a briefing on 12 April 1958 during Operation 17 August

After Independence in 1945, Yani joined the army of the fledgling republic and fought against the Dutch. During the first months after the Declaration of Independence, Yani formed a battalion with himself as commander, and led it to victory against the British at Magelang. Yani followed this up with a successful defence of Magelang against a Dutch attempt to retake the city, earning him the nickname of the "Savior of Magelang". He was also noted in this period for the series of guerrilla offensives he launched in early 1949 to distract the Dutch, whilst Lieutenant Colonel Suharto prepared for the 1 March General Offensive targeting Yogyakarta and its suburbs.

After Indonesia's independence was formally recognised by the Netherlands in 1949, Yani was transferred to Tegal, Central Java. In 1952, he was called back into action to fight Darul Islam, a group of rebels seeking to establish a theocracy. To deal with the rebels, Yani formed the special forces group, the Banteng Raiders (now the 400th Raider Infantry Battalion, Kodam IV/Diponegoro). Over the next three years, Darul Islam forces in Central Java suffered successive defeats.

In December 1955, Yani left for the United States to study at the Command and General Staff College at Fort Leavenworth. Returning in 1956, Yani was transferred to Army Headquarters in Jakarta where he became a staff member for General Abdul Haris Nasution. At Army Headquarters, Yani served as Logistics Assistant to the Army Chief of Staff, before becoming Deputy Army Chief of Staff for Organization and Personnel.

In August 1958, he commanded Operation 17 August against the Revolutionary Government of the Republic of Indonesia in West Sumatra. His troops managed to recapture Padang and Bukittinggi, and this success led to his being promoted to 2nd deputy Army chief of staff on 1 September 1962, and then Army Chief of Staff on 28 June 1962 (thus automatically becoming a member of Cabinet), replacing General Nasution, who was appointed Minister of Defence.

== Assassination ==
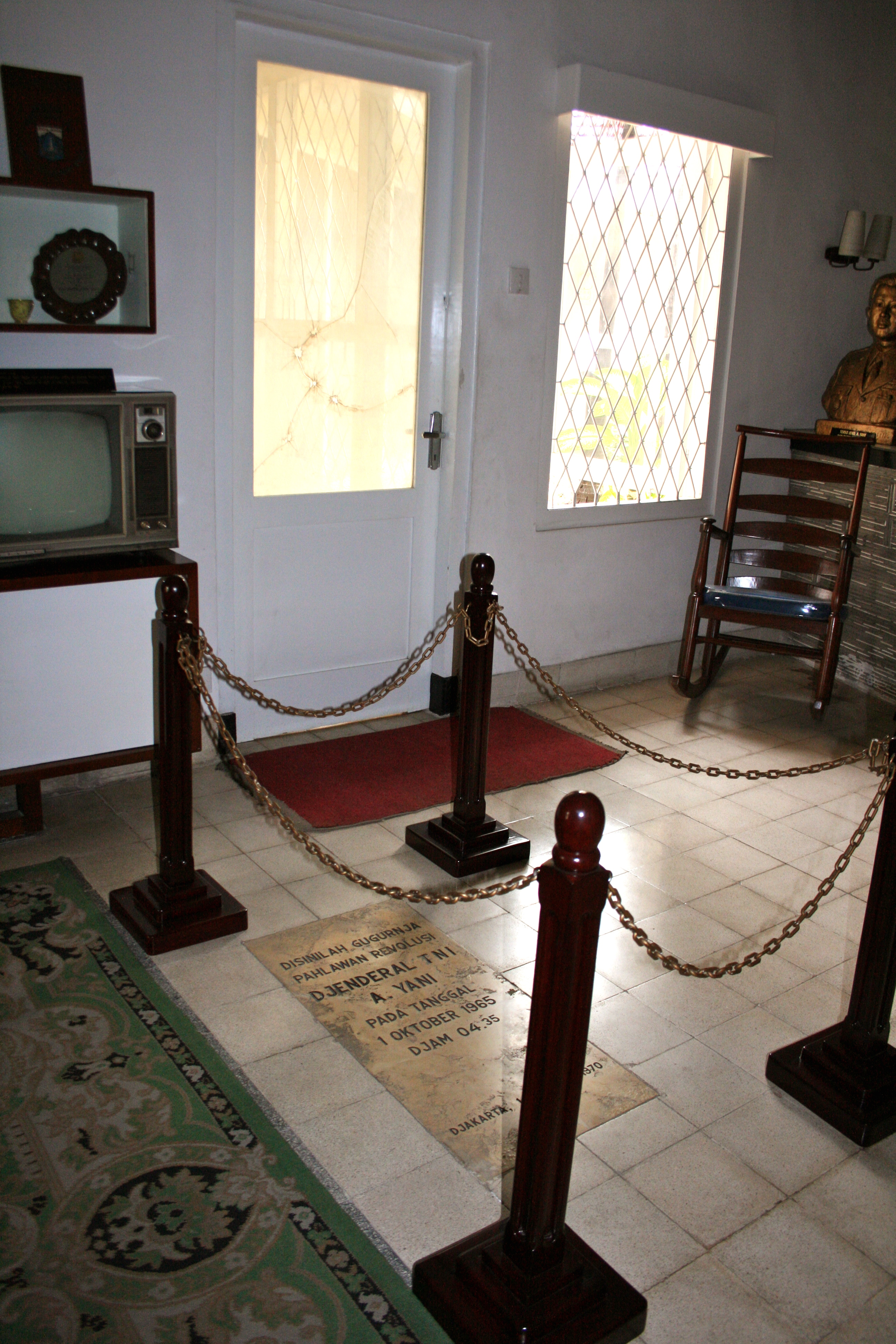
Plaque marking the place when Yani fell after being shot by members of the 30 September Movement – his former home is now a museum. Note the bullet holes in the door.

As President Sukarno was closer to the Indonesian Communist Party (PKI) in the early 1960s, the staunchly anticommunist Yani became very wary of the PKI, especially after the Party declared its support for the establishment of a people’s militia, with Sukarno trying to impose his Nasakom (Nationalism-Religion-Communism) doctrine on the military. Both Yani and Nasution procrastinated when ordered by Sukarno on 31 May 1965 to prepare plans to arm the people.

In the early hours of 1 October 1965, the 30 September Movement attempted to kidnap seven members of the Army general staff. A squad of about 200 soldiers surrounded Yani’s home on No. 6, Latuharhary Street in the Jakarta suburb of Menteng. Usually, Yani had eleven men guarding his home; his wife later reported another six were assigned to him a week before. These men were from the command of Colonel Latief, who, unbeknownst to Yani, was one of the main plotters in 30 September Movement. According to Yani’s wife, the additional men did not appear for duty that night. Yani and his children were asleep in the house while she was out with a group of friends and relatives celebrating her birthday. She later recounted that as she drove away from the home at about 11:00 pm, she noticed someone sitting in the shadows across the street as if keeping the house under surveillance. She thought nothing of it at the time, but following the events later that morning she wondered differently. Also, from about 9:00 pm on the evening of 30 September, a series of phone calls were made to the house at intervals, which when answered would be met with mere silence or a voice asking for the time. The phone calls continued until about 1:00 am, and Mrs Yani said she had a premonition something was wrong that night.

Yani spent the evening with official callers; at 7:00 pm, he received a colonel from the Supreme Operations Command. General Basuki Rahmat, divisional commander in East Java, then arrived from his headquarters in Surabaya. Basuki had come to Jakarta to report to Yani of his concerns over increasing Communist activity in East Java. After complimenting his report, Yani asked him to accompany him to his meeting the next morning with the President to relay his account.

When Yani’s would-be abductors came to his home and said he was to be brought before the President, Yani asked for time to bathe and change clothes. When they refused, he angrily slapped one of the soldiers, then tried to shut the front door of his house. One of his assailants then opened fire, killing him. His body was taken to Lubang Buaya on the outskirts of Jakarta and, with the bodies of other murdered generals, was thrown down a disused well.

The corpses were disinterred on 4 October, and all were given a state funeral the next day, being buried at the National Main Heroes’ Cemetery in Kalibata, South Jakarta. On the same day, Yani and his colleagues were officially declared Pahlawan Revolusi (“Heroes of the Revolution”) by Presidential Decision No. 111/KOTI/1965. Yani’s was posthumously promoted from lieutenant general to a 4-star general (Indonesian: Jenderal Anumerta).

After the assassination, Mrs Yani and her children moved out of their Latuharhary Street home, and she helped transform the house into a public museum. It is preserved largely as it was in October 1965, from the furniture to the bullet holes in the front door and walls. Today, many Indonesian cities have roads named after Yani, and the Jenderal Ahmad Yani International Airport in Semarang is named after him.

== Honours ==
=== National honours ===
- Star of the Republic of Indonesia, 2nd Class (Indonesian: Bintang Republik Indonesia Adipradana) (posthumous) (10 November 1965)
- Star of the Republic of Indonesia, 3rd Class (Indonesian: Bintang Republik Indonesia Utama) (10 January 1963)
- Sacred Star (Indonesian: Bintang Sakti)
- Guerrilla Star (Indonesian: Bintang Gerilya)
- Indonesian Armed Forces "8 Years" Service Star (Indonesian: Bintang Sewindu Angkatan Perang Republik Indonesia)
- Military Long Service Medal, 16 Years Service (Indonesian: Satyalancana Kesetiaan XVI Tahun)
- 1st Independence War Medal (Indonesian: Satyalancana Perang Kemerdekaan I)
- 2nd Independence War Medal (Indonesian: Satyalancana Perang Kemerdekaan II)
- Military Operational Service Medal for Madiun 1947 (Indonesian: Satyalancana G.O.M I)
- Military Operational Service Medal for Central Java 1960 (Indonesian: Satyalancana G.O.M VI)
- "Sapta Marga" Medal (Indonesian: Satyalancana Sapta Marga)
- Military Service Medal for Irian Jaya 1962 (Indonesian: Satyalancana Satya Dharma)

=== Foreign honours ===
- Yugoslavia:
  - Second Rank of the Order of the People's Army with Golden Star (1958)
