= PRRI rebellion =

1957–62 rebellion in Sumatra

PRRI Rebellion
- Part of the Age of Gerombolan, Cold War in Asia, and the CIA activities in Indonesia
Date	12 March 1958 – 28 September 1961 (small bands persisted until 1962 in South Sumatra)
Location	Central Sumatra and South Sumatra
Result	Indonesian government victory

Belligerents
Indonesia	PRRI; Supported by: Permesta; United States

Commanders and leaders
Sukarno; A.H. Nasution; Ahmad Yani; Omar Dhani; Djamin Ginting	Sjafruddin Prawiranegara (surrendered); Assaat Dt. Mudo (POW); Ahmad Husein (POW); Dahlan Djambek (executed); Burhanuddin Harahap (POW)

Casualties and losses
1,031 dead full government source: 2,499 soldier killed 4,098 wounded 488 missing; 247 police killed 519 wounded 320 missing; 956 member of the people's defense organization (OPR) killed 611 wounded 434 missing; Total: 3,702 killed, 5,228 wounded, 1,242 missing (include casualties in PRRI and Permesta rebellion)	6,115 dead 24,500 surrender full government source: 22,174 killed; 4,360 wounded; 8,072 captured; 123,917 surrender; 39,000 weapons captured; (include casualties of Permesta member)
- 5,592 civilians killed 3,834 civilians wounded 2,472 civilians missing (include casualties in PRRI and Permesta rebellion) Total killed: 31,468 killed (per government source)

PRRI rebellion was a conflict between the Indonesian government and Revolutionary Government of the Republic of Indonesia rebels from 1957 to 1962.

== Central Sumatra conflict ==
=== Conflict ===
The central government saw PRRI as a separatist movement that had to be crushed by force of arms. The central government through the Angkatan Perang Republik Indonesia (APRI or nicknamed "tentara pusat/the central army") conducted a joint operation consisting of Army, Navy, and Air force. The operations that were carried out were Operation Tegas, Operation 17 Agustus, Operation Saptamarga, Operation Sadar, Operation Merdeka

In the early stages of the military operation, government administration activities were paralyzed, officials and employees fled in order to save themselves. To revive the government, the central government divided Central Sumatra into three provinces, one of which was West Sumatra. On May 17, 1958, Kaharuddin Datuk Rangkayo Basa was appointed as the first Governors of West Sumatra.

On the other hand, the actions of the central army are running out of control. APRI soldiers committed acts of violence. Thousands of people suspected of being PRRI sympathizers were arbitrarily arrested. Actions of mass killings occurred in a number of places. Under the Jam Gadang, APRI killed around 187 people by shooting. Only 17 of that number were PRRI soldiers, while the rest were civilians. The corpses were then lined up in the courtyard of the Clock Tower.

From mid-April 1958 to 1960, all junior and senior high schools were closed. Andalas University, which had only been running for two years, was forced to close because almost all of its lecturers and students joined PRRI. Towards the end of 1960, the entire area of West Sumatra was under the control of the APRI army.

Abdul Haris Nasution noted that PRRI military operations claimed the lives of 7,146 people on both sides. Most of those who died, namely 6,115 were "from the PRRI side". Saafroedin Bahar Saafroedin Bahar noted that the number of victims resulting from the short PRRI conflict was far greater than the victims of the war with the Netherlands during the independence revolution.

Apart from military operations, the central government took a diplomatic approach by persuading the PRRI soldiers to surrender and return to loyalty to the Unitary State of the Republic of Indonesia. This event is called Operation Callback. On May 29, 1961, Ahmad Husein officially surrendered along with around 24,500 of his followers. Furthermore, the government granted amnesty to civilian and military elements who had been involved in the PRRI. The amnesty was stated in Presidential Decree No. 322 of 1961 dated 22 June 1961. Although the PRRI leadership responded to the government's call, in reality the promise of amnesty was only rhetoric. For several years, PRRI's civilian and military leadership was quarantined. Communities, especially college students and students, experience heavy life pressures.

=== Beginning of the end ===
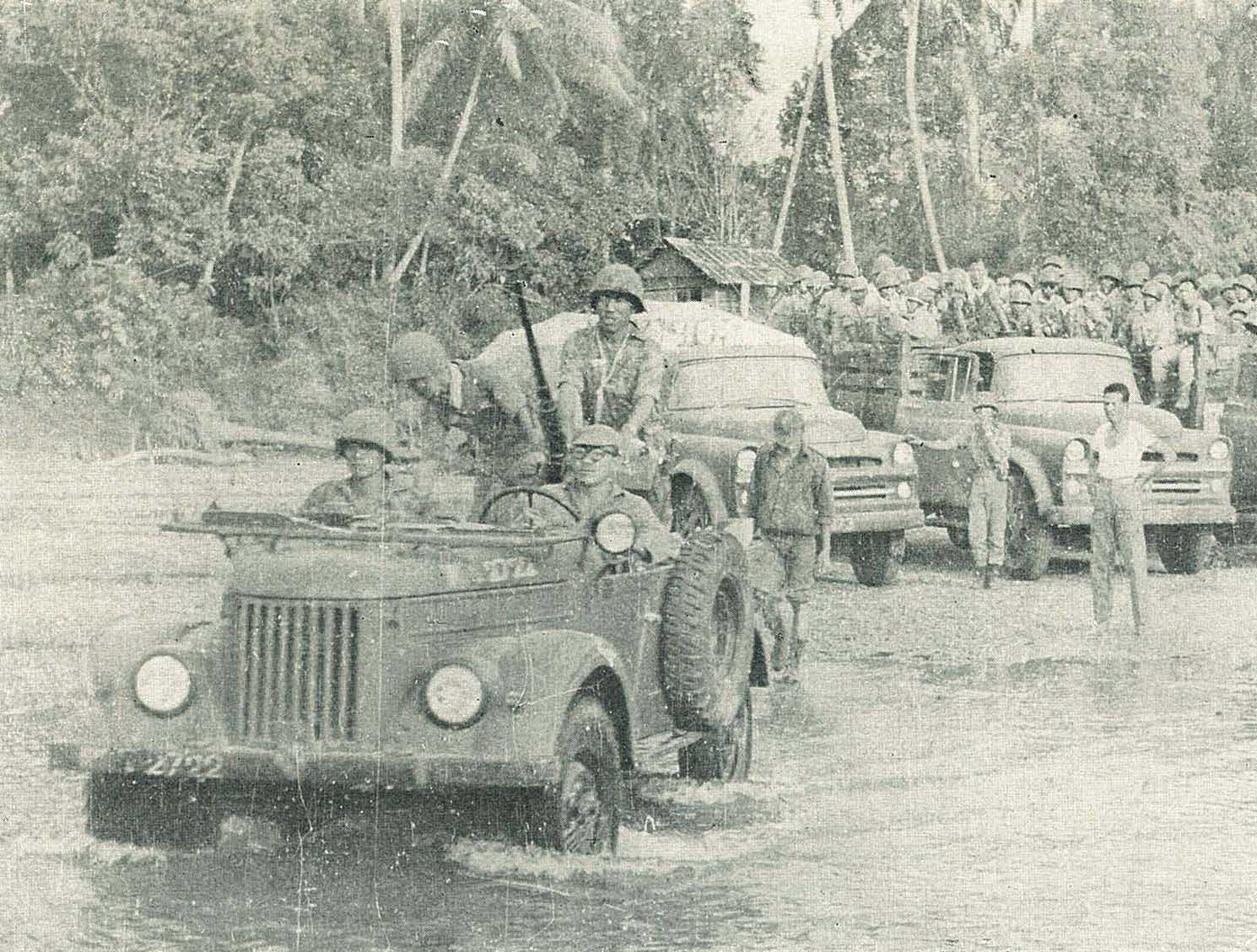
Indonesian marines crossing a river at Air Gadang, West Pasaman

The central government in Jakarta, having tolerated the dissident Army Councils for almost twelve months, promptly began preparations to militarily defeat the PRRI. The rebels had virtually no chance of success given the overwhelming superiority of the government forces. In addition, the military experience possessed by General Nasution, who was leading the government military forces, far exceeded that of Lieutenant Colonel Husein.

The government military campaign that commenced on 12 March 1958 scored a quick victory in preventing the destruction of the Caltex oil fields and refinery in Pekanbaru by the PRRI forces. That attack also laid bare that the PRRI was receiving military aid from the United States, given the large amount of US-made equipment abandoned by the PRRI forces which had taken flight.

The United States government, especially the CIA (see CIA activities in Indonesia) had covertly supported the rebel PRRI Government in 1958, despite some dissent in the agency from Desmond Fitzgerald. With the Americans posturing to become directly involved in the crisis, General Nasution conducted surprise amphibious assaults on rebel cities in Sumatra during March 1958.

With the military balance swiftly swinging in favour of the central government in Jakarta during the period March–May 1958, and the fact that Lieutenant Colonel Husein had little choice but to pursue a strategy of withdrawal and guerrilla warfare which would make it difficult for the United States to publicly recognise the PRRI, the United States had to reconsider its previous policy assessment that the break-up of Indonesia and emergence of a communist government was likely. The Pope incident on 18 May 1958 signalled the beginning of the end of the CIA's program of covert support to the PRRI, with the US shifting its support back towards Sukarno and the central government as the anticipated victor from the conflict.

=== Surrender ===
Although the conflict dragged on over the next three years, the government forces were successful in pushing the PRRI into the jungle and mountains, and retook several strongholds, including Kototinggi where the PRRI leadership was headquartered.

General Nasution, who was leading the government forces, launched Operasi Pemanggilan Kembali (Operation Call Back) at the end of 1960 to take advantage of internal rifts within the PRRI. The main objective of which was to persuade the army officers supporting the PRRI to surrender themselves, because once there was no longer military support, the civilians would also follow suit.

Small numbers of PRRI troops began surrendering from April 1961, while the majority did so in the middle of 1961. The last vestiges of the PRRI held out for a few more months before the final surrender by Mohammad Natsir, who was the last of them, on 28 September 1961.

== South Sumatra conflict ==
While the government of South Sumatra refused to take part in the PRRI rebellion, the Deputy Chief of Staff of the South Sumatran command (Major Nawawi) and another officer (Major Z. Kamidan) joined the rebellion and created a guerilla group in Bengkulu and Muba regions. In mid-1961 Zakaria launched an attempted coup against Nawawi forcing the latter one to retreat into Muba. In December 1961 a peace agreement was reached between Nawawi and the Indonesian government, and finally in early 1962 his forces surrendered.
