= Karanganom =

- Village
- Location within Java
- Coordinates: 7°39′S 110°37′E
- Country: Indonesia
- Province: Central Java
- Regency: Klaten Regency

Area
  - Total: 9.89 sq mi (25.62 km^{2})

Population (2023)
  - Total: 47,179
  - Density: 4,769/sq mi (1,841/km^{2})

Karanganom is an administrative (kecamatan) in Indonesia. It is located in the Klaten Regency in Central Java Province.

Rice and sugar cane are among the crops cultivated by farmers in Karanganom. An academic study published in 2020 examined the motivations of organic rice farmers in the area.
