= Komando Jihad =

1970s–80s Indonesian extremist group

Komando Jihad (lit. 'Jihad Commando') was an Indonesian Islamic extremist group that existed from the 1970s until it was dissolved through the actions of the security services in the mid-1980s. The group's foundation was an offshoot of Darul Islam, an extremist group fighting for an Indonesian Islamic state that began in the 1940s. The group split from DI with the support of the Indonesian secret services, BAKIN.

Damien Kingsbury has alleged that the group was set up by Kopassus, the Indonesian Army special forces. In 2020, Tempo Data and Analysis Center released an investigation report after researching contemporary reports, confirming that parts of the story were true, although the formation of the group was actually much more inadvertent.

== History ==
=== Formation ===
Komando Jihad was formed around the 1970s. Records state that they had already existed as early as 1975 under the name "Indonesian Islamic Revolutionary Board" (Indonesian: Dewan Revolusi Islam Indonesia, DRII), an anti-Suharto underground Islamic resistance movement led by Imran bin Muhammad Zein. In a letter to Ruhollah Khomeini supposedly sent after the Iranian Revolution, Imran congratulated him on the successful revolution, and claimed to have founded the DRII with the assistance of some officers of the Indonesian Army. The stated goal of the group was to found an Islamic State of Indonesia and to topple communism.

In another side, Admiral Sudomo, Commander of the Kopkamtib revealed in the aftermath of the hijacking of Garuda Indonesia Flight 206 to the ulamas that in the early 1970s, the government fostered some Darul Islam veterans under the Indonesian state intelligence agency at that time, Intelligence Coordinating Agency (Indonesian: Badan Koordinasi Intelijen, Bakin, the predecessor of the current Indonesian State Intelligence Agency) to provide a mass base for the ruling government to prepare the 1971 election. However, the plan apparently backfired, as some of the veterans later returned to jihadism and Islamic extremism, siding against Suharto. The formation of the DRII and the subsequent Komando Jihad was unexpected and not anticipated by the government. Sudomo said that their transformation into the DRII and Komando Jihad was beyond Bakin's knowledge and claimed it was an out-of-hands situation.

== Hijack of Garuda Indonesia Flight 206 ==
On 28 March 1981, five members of Komando Jihad boarded a Garuda Douglas DC-9 on a domestic flight from Palembang to Medan and took it and the 57 passengers aboard to Bangkok, Thailand. They were armed with machine guns and dynamite, and demanded the release of 20 political prisoners, that all "Jew officials and Israeli militarists" be expelled from Indonesia, and that they be given $1.5 million. After four days, Indonesian commandos stormed the plane, killing three out of the five hijackers and the plane's pilot. Two of the hijackers surrendered to Thai commandos, but they were extrajudicially killed by the Kopassus commandos on the plane trip back to Jakarta.

It was the first plane hijacking event in the history of the Republic of Indonesia Airline and the first jihad motivated terrorism in Indonesia.
