= Darul Islam rebellion =

Indonesian Islamic militants rebellion

- Part of the Age of Gerombolan and Cold War in Asia
- Darul Islam presence in Java in the early 1950s
Date	7 August 1949 – 2 September 1962 (Last remnant defeated in 19 October, 1967)
Location	Indonesia, mainly in West Java, Aceh, and South Sulawesi
Result	Government victory; Dissolution of the Darul Islam; Former Darul Islam veterans form the Komando Jihad; Beginning of a new rebellion in Aceh by the Free Aceh Movement in 1976; Formation of Jemaah Islamiyah as the successor of Komando Jihad
Territorial changes	All territories controlled by rebels were recaptured by the government

Belligerents
Republic of Indonesia: Dompea; Mandau Talawang Pancasila; Tentara Keamanan Rakyat (1953-1955)	Islamic State of Indonesia; 426 Battalion (1951–1952); South Sulawesi Guerrilla Union (1950–1953) (Note: Joined Darul Islam); Barisan Sakit Hati (1951–1956) (Note: Joined Darul Islam) Legion of the Just Ruler (until 1950)

Commanders and leaders
(Indonesia) Sukarno (Indonesia) Sudirman (Indonesia) Tahi Bonar Simatupang (Indonesia) Abdul Haris Nasution (Indonesia) Soerjadi Soerjadarma (Indonesia) Alexander Evert Kawilarang (Indonesia) Suharto (Indonesia) Ahmad Yani	Sekarmadji Maridjan Kartosoewirjo (executed); Abdul Kahar Muzakkar †; Daud Beureueh (surrendered); Hasan di Tiro; Ibnu Hadjar (executed); Amir Fatah (surrendered); C.H. van Kleef (executed); Raymond Westerling (until 1950); Piet Colson

Strength
80,000 (1951)	10,000-20,000 (South Sulawesi)

Casualties and losses
13,000+ dead (consisting of Sundanese people, Indonesian soldiers and members of the village security organization (OKD) that died)	Unknown
- 22,895 total dead 102,984 lootings, 17,673 houses burned (1957)

The Darul Islam rebellion (Indonesian: Pemberontakan Darul Islam) was a war waged between 1949 and 1962 by the Islamic State of Indonesia, commonly known as Darul Islam, to establish an Islamic state in Indonesia. The rebellion was launched by Sekarmadji Maridjan Kartosoewirjo, a former Indonesian nationalist who refused to recognize the new Republic of Indonesia. Instead, he proclaimed the establishment of the Islamic State of Indonesia on 7 August 1949.

Kartosuwirjo led Darul Islam's war against the Indonesian government for 13 years before he was captured by the Indonesian Army in 1962 and executed in 1965. After he was captured, Kartosuwirjo issued orders for his followers to surrender, although some pockets of resistance remained in Southeast Sulawesi until 1965.

== Background ==
After the Japanese surrendered in 1945, ending World War II, Sukarno proclaimed the independence of Indonesia on 17 August 1945, and became the nation's first president. While the Japanese soon left the former Dutch East Indies, the Dutch returned to reclaim former colonies in 1946. Indonesian militias fought the Dutch for three years in the Indonesian National Revolution. One of the militias—the Siliwangi Division of the Indonesian Army, based in West Java—was led by Kartosuwirjo, who had initially supported the Japanese during their three years of occupation.

The Netherlands and the Republic of Indonesia signed the Linggadjati Agreement on 25 March 1947. The agreement gave the Republic control of the islands of Java, Sumatra and Madura, while the Dutch controlled the other islands. However, the Netherlands broke the agreement by launching Operation Product and invading Indonesian territory, and Kartosuwirjo called for a holy war against the Dutch.

Under the Renville Agreement, which the Republic of Indonesia and the Netherlands ratified on 19 January 1948, all Indonesian troops withdrew and moved from West Java to Central Java (Jogja). Kartosuwirjo saw the agreement as a failure of Indonesian diplomatic strategy because it reduced the Republic's sovereignty. He therefore ordered his troops to engage in guerrilla warfare against the Dutch as a holy war to protect Indonesian independence. The revolution ended on 27 December 1949, after the Dutch–Indonesian Round Table Conference, in which the Dutch officially recognised the Republic of Indonesia.

== Beginning of rebellion ==
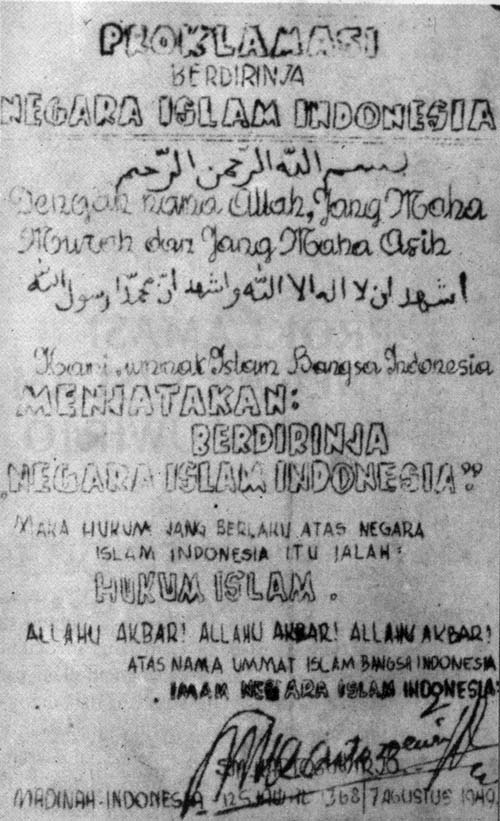
Proclamation of the establishment of Islamic State of Indonesia

When Indonesia regained independence from the Dutch in 1949, Kartosuwirjo refused to disband his militia. He proclaimed the establishment of the Islamic State of Indonesia on 7 August 1949, and named himself as its imam. His group was supported by many Indonesians, including Daud Beureueh, the governor of Aceh, who would become the vice imam of the group in 1955. (Beureueh surrendered to the government in 1957.) Elements of the Indonesian Army deserted and joined Darul Islam.

Kartosuwirjo also forged an alliance with Raymond Westerling, a former officer in the Royal Netherlands East Indies Army who was leading a rebellion, known as the Legion of the Just Ruler (APRA), against the Indonesian government. APRA was quickly defeated by the Indonesian Army in the army's stronghold at Bandung, and Westerling fled to Singapore in 1950. Former APRA soldiers who refused to surrender to the government joined Darul Islam.

In 1952, Kahar Muzzakar, a former presidential guard of Sukarno, deserted and led a rebellion in Central and South Sulawesi. He initially wanted to create his own militant group, but instead joined Darul Islam in 1953. Darul Islam was also supported by other rebel groups that opposed the central government, like Permesta and PRRI.

Members of Darul Islam had tried several times to assassinate Sukarno. On 9 March 1960, a Mig-17 of the Indonesian Air Force, flown by flight lieutenant Daniel "Tiger" Maukar, attempted to assassinate Sukarno by firing a 23×115mm round on Merdeka Palace. However, Sukarno was not in the palace at the time. Maukar flew his plane to Garut, where he was going to be picked up by another Darul Islam member, but the army captured him before he could escape. Maukar was tried and sentenced to death. Sukarno personally pardoned him and commuted his sentence to life in prison.

== Military operations by Indonesia ==
=== Operation Pagar Betis ===
Operation Pagar Betis was a military operation aiming to eliminate most of Darul Islam forces, blockade and destroyed the suspected Darul Islam regions, and cut off their supplies with "Pagar Betis Tactics". The beginning of this operation infiltrated the Darul Islam regions. But they realized the need of some support of civilians and Nasution decided to help the civilians in their social activity like farming, harvest, and building some towers to spying the Darul Islam forces. With this efforts the civilians finally helping the Indonesian forces and participated into this operations. Finally in 1962 after many of their forces were eliminated, lack of supplies, and the successful blockade by Indonesian forces. Kartosoewirjo deciding to surrender and ended his rebellion.

=== Operation Gunung Gede ===
On March 1957, after KKO launched military operation on Indramayu called "Operation Indra", the operation was successful in defeating the Darul Islam rebels. However the KKO decided to launched second operations called "Operation Gunung Gede" on Mount Gede, by order of Chief of Staff of the Indonesian Navy, the composite of this forces was only 2 platoons led by Captain Boy Abidin, Lieutenant Pratowo Soedibyo, and Lieutenant Soegito. On 19 March they arrived to Sukabumi, after their arrival they reported to Battalion Regiments of 8 TT.III after that they continued crossed into Cibodas to Cipanas. On 21 March they reached on Mount Gede but it was cold and resulted in the forces resting on the slope of mountains. The forces launched the attack and faced skirmishes on mountain top. As a result the KKO forces manage to capturing most of Darul Islam documents. On 23 March the KKO engaged in combat against Darul Islam in Curug Ciheuleng, the assault was success and resulted in the deaths of many former leaders of Darul Islam.

== Dissolution and aftermath ==
Starting in 1956, the government went on the offensive against Darul Islam. The group was severely weakened after its top leaders were killed or captured, and many members surrendered. The government regained full control of Aceh in 1957 after the local branch of Darul Islam surrendered. Factions in South Kalimantan disbanded in 1959 after their leader was killed. By 1962, there were only pockets of resistance in West Java and South Sulawesi.

In June 1962, Kartosuwirjo was captured by the army in his hideout in Garut. He was tried, sentenced to death, and executed three months later in the Thousand Islands. During his time in prison, Kartosuwirjo ordered his followers to surrender. The last Darul Islam band, in Southeast Sulawesi, did so in 1965.

Even after the group was dissolved, some Indonesians continued to support its ideology. Along with some former Darul Islam members, they formed the Komando Jihad, which evolved into the present-day terrorist group Jemaah Islamiyah. Additionally, in 1976, former Darul Islam member Hasan di Tiro created the Free Aceh Movement, which attempted to separate the province of Aceh from Indonesia. Di Tiro waged war against the Indonesian government for 38 years before finally signing a peace treaty in Helsinki in August 2005.
