= Mandau Talawang Pancasila =

Paramilitary organization in Indonesia

- Dates active: 1953 – present
- Country: Indonesia
- Active regions: Central Kalimantan and West Kalimantan
- Ideology: Pancasila; Indonesian nationalism Dayak regionalism Anti-Islamism

Mandau Talawang Pancasila (GMTPs, Indonesian: Gerakan Mandau Talawang Pancasila) is a paramilitary organization, based mostly within the Indonesian provinces of Central Kalimantan and West Kalimantan.

== History ==
The organization was founded in November 1953 as "Telabang Pancasila Dayak Sector", and played an active role in opposing the Darul Islam rebellion in South Kalimantan as well as pushing for the creation of a Dayak-dominated province in central Kalimantan. The name of the organization refers to the mandau, a traditional Dayak weapon, the talawang, a shield, and Pancasila, the state ideology of Indonesia. The organization retains the support of Indonesian military and local government.

After the recognition of Indonesian independence in 1949, it was planned that Kalimantan was to be split up into several provinces to simplify governance in the region. However, regionalism in the region arose from the dissatisfaction of the interior Dayak population to provincial government in Banjarmasin which they thought to be dominated by Banjarese. The Indonesian Dayak Kaharingan Union, an association of Dayak politicians, pushed for the creation of their own Dayak-dominated province, but the idea was rejected by the Indonesian Ministry of Home Affairs which argued that the population of the region – just over 500,000 – was too little for a province. Disappointed with the national government, the union formed a paramilitary organization to promote the idea of the creation of a separate province in the interior of Kalimantan as well as holding a congress in Banjarmasin. The paramilitary organization chose to include "Pancasila" in their name to declare that the movement was not about separatism and that they were still loyal to the Indonesian state. However, the paramilitary wing often resorted to hijacking ships in rivers which caused tension with the security forces. The clashes culminated on 22 November 1953 when the group raided the town of Buntok and killed several police in retaliation. At its height, it was estimated that the organization had a membership of 42,000 spanning different religious groups and was divided into three sectoral commands.

One of the GMTPs leaders, Sahari Andung, was arrested in December 1956 under charges of subversion, but later was released and tasked with resettling former GMTPs members who had been fighting a guerilla war in the jungle. At the same time, several Dayak politicians approached Kalimantan's governor, Murdjani, to discuss the matter of creation of a new province. On 23 May 1957, Central Kalimantan province was finally created and a peace agreement was reached between the group and security forces in the region. GMTPs itself had officially surrendered to the central government in March 1957. Many of its former members were recruited into the Indonesian Army and the group turned its attention to fighting Darul Islam rebels in South Kalimantan province.

== Recent activity ==
Mandau Talawang Pancasila was allegedly involved in the massacre of the Madurese people in the Sampit conflict and backed by pro-Dayak politicians and military leaders. The organization often opposes the presence of non-Dayak politicians in Central Kalimantan province, such as in 2019 when the group opposed the non-Dayak parliamentary speaker. The organization also supports the disbandment of Islamic Defenders Front, a fundamentalist Islamist organization that they accuse of replacing Pancasila with Islamism and turning Indonesia into caliphate.
