= Barisan Sakit Hati =

Anti-government militia in Indonesia

The Heartbroken Troops
- Barisan Sakit Hati
- Founder: Sukendro †
- Military leader: Bunawi †; Leman (executed)
- Founded: February 1951
- Dates active: 1951–1956
- Merged into: Darul Islam (Indonesia)
- Active regions: Cirebon, West Java, Indonesia
- Size: 1,260 (1951)

Barisan Sakit Hati – was an insurgent group active in Indonesia from 1951 to 1956. The group operated in Cirebon Regency and was composed of guerrillas who either refused to join the Indonesian National Armed Forces or demobilized.

== History ==
On 9 February 1951 the former TNI soldiers who were dissatisfied with the military reorganization process reportedly formed a group named Barisan Sakit Hati in North Priangan. The group was led by a former TNI captain named Sukendro. In August Barisan Sakit Hati reportedly abducted a man from Sumur Adem and killed him. Between 19 and 20 November 1951 a meeting between TNI’s C Brigade and Barisan Sakit Hati was held in Panawuan, Cilimus. Under this agreement, Barisan Sakit Hati personnels would be absorbed to Brigade C after undergoing military training. However, many of the BSH leaders, such as Leman, refuse to undertake military training.

In May 1952, some of the Battalion 315 deserted and moved to the mountains. They then declared themselves as part of Barisan Sakit Hati. In August Battalion 306 attacked Barisan Sakit Hati in Koyoh, capturing five insurgents. After a 15 minute clash, BSH withdrew to Juntingrat.

In early April 1953 a commander of Barisan Sakit Hati, Surjadi, and his 24 men were arrested in Banjir Kanal, Semarang after attempting to attack an army post in Kaliwangu. On 21 April 1953 two members of BSH were arrested in Karet Tengsin, Jakarta.

In mid-January 1954 eight members of Barisan Sakit Hati were arrested in Kampong Sawah, Kebayoran, Jakarta. They had committed robberies and murders in Cirebon before moving to Jakarta.

By mid-June 1955 the following BSH leaders had been killed: Tarmadja, Duliman, and Bunawi; Suki was arrested. Leman was the leader of rebels at large.

On 14 January 1956 three members of the Leman gang were arrested, accused of murder perpetrated three months before. Reportedly at this point the gang has joined Darul Islam. In July Leman was executed by his own men.
