= Maritime Security Agency =

Maritime Security Agency can refer to:

- Indonesian Maritime Security Agency
- Pakistan Maritime Security Agency
