= List of aircraft of the Indonesian National Armed Forces =

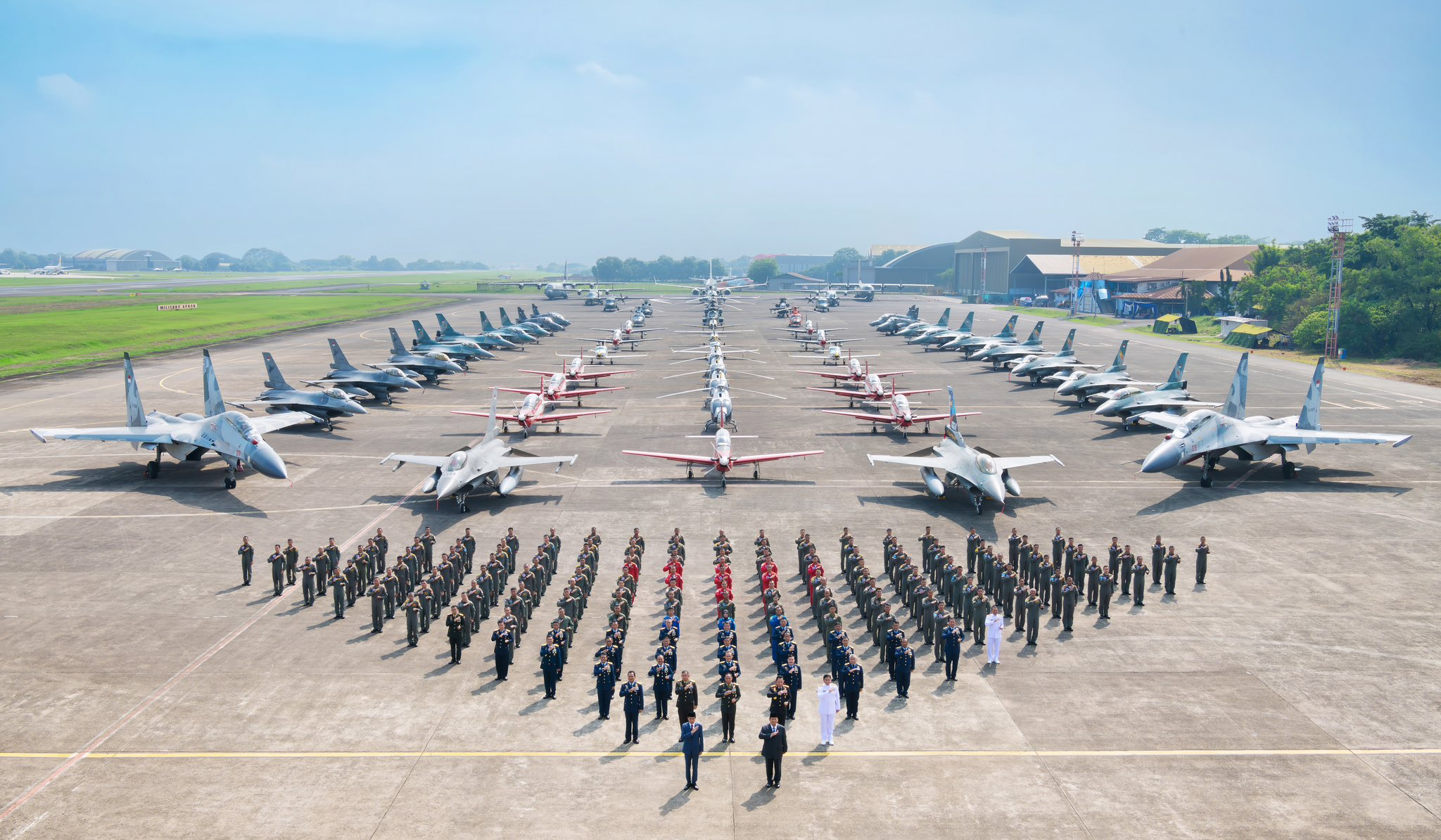
Indonesian National Armed Forces aviation equipment shown during the 79th Anniversary in Halim Perdanakusuma Air Force Base

This list identifies the military aircraft which are being operated or have formerly been operated by the Indonesian National Armed Forces.

== Current aircraft ==
=== Indonesian Army Aviation ===
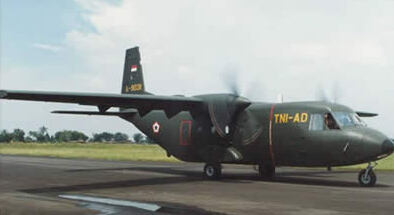
NC212 Aviocar

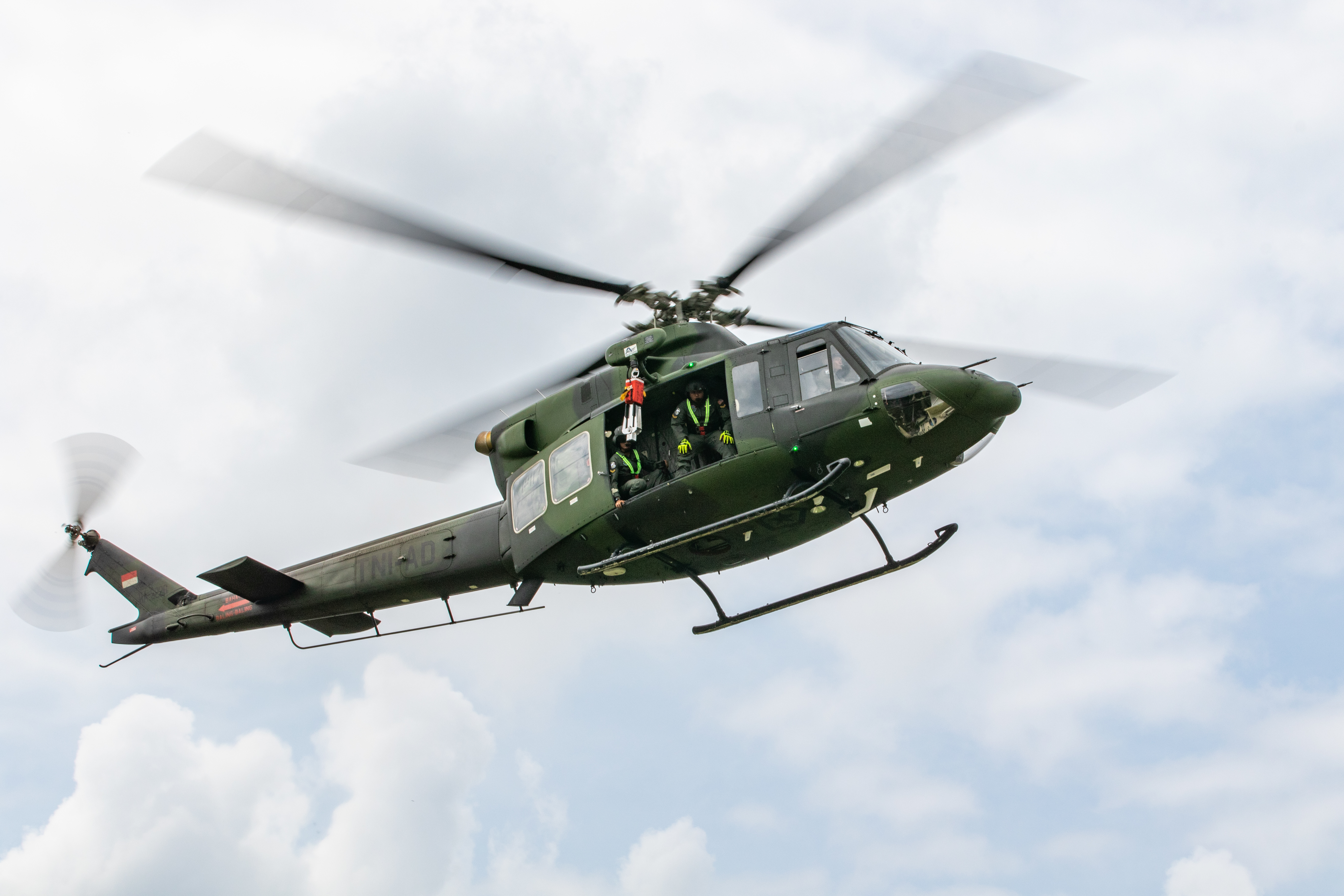
Bell 412EPI

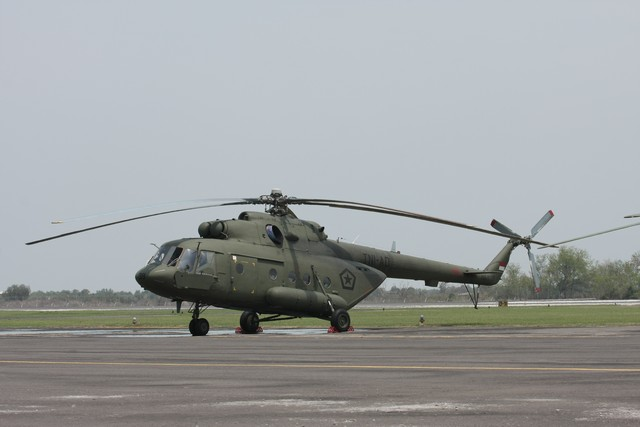
Mi-17V-5

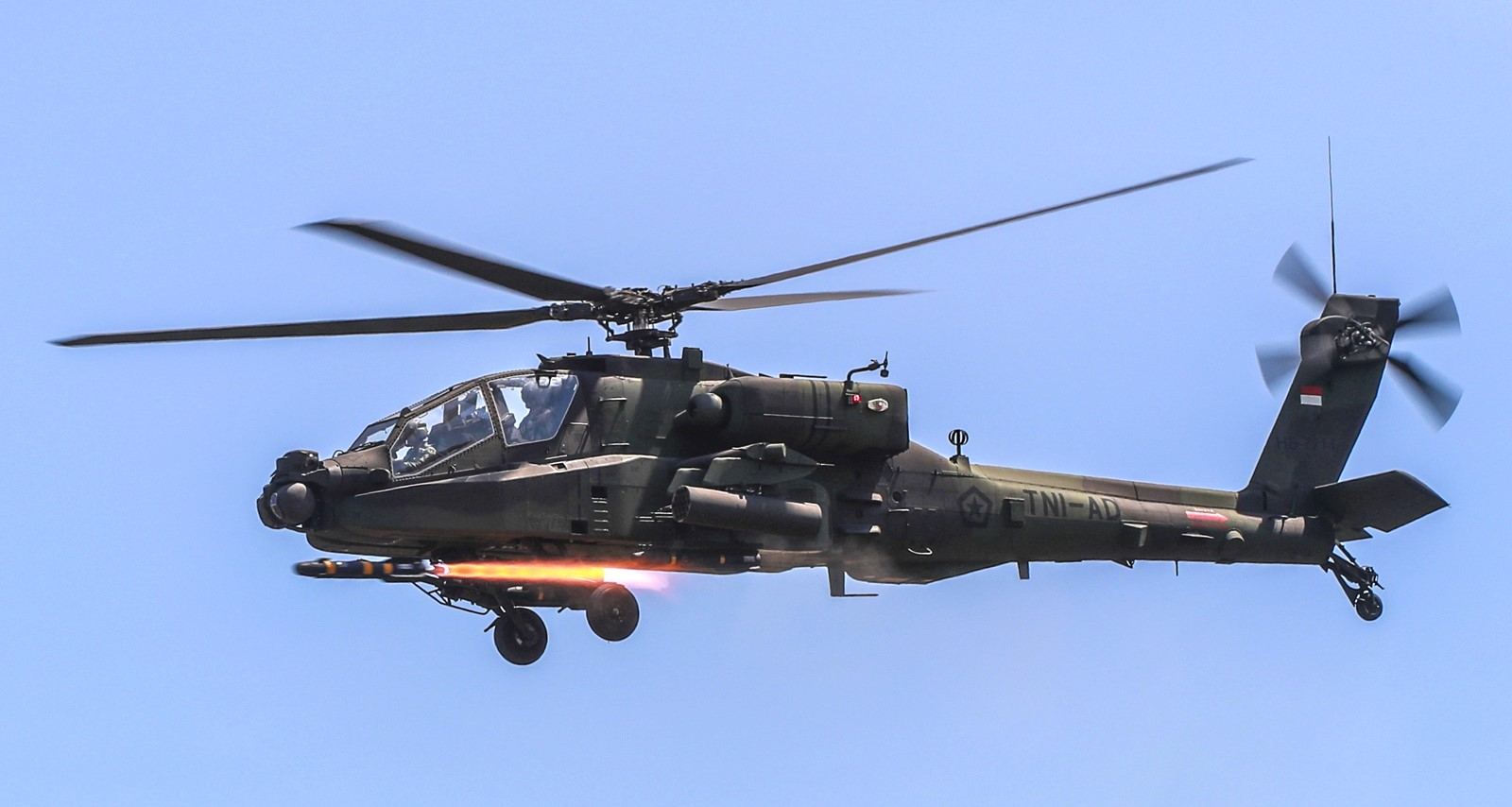
AH-64E Apache

Aircraft	Origin	Type	Variant	In service	Notes
Fixed-wing aircraft
CASA/IPTN CN-235	Indonesia / Spain	Tactical airlifter	CN235-220	0 (+ 3 on order)	3 on order
CASA C-212	Indonesia / Spain	Tactical airlifter	NC212-100 / 220M	6	Licensed built by PT DI
Indonesian Aerospace N219	Indonesia	Tactical airlifter		0 (+ 6 on order)	6 on order
Beechcraft Premier I	United States	VIP transport		1	
Helicopters
Boeing AH-64 Apache	United States	Attack helicopter	AH-64E	8	
Mil Mi-24	Russia	Attack helicopter	Mi-35P Mi-35M	5 2	(Note: Flightglobal's World Air Forces mentioned that Indonesian Army has 7 Mi-35, although according to SIPRI and the Indonesian military itself, the Indonesian Army only have 5 Mi-35, of which 2 were delivered in 2003 and 3 were delivered in 2010.)
Sikorsky UH-60 Black Hawk	United States	Utility	S-70M	0 (+ 22 on order)	
Bell 205	United States	Light attack / utility	Bell 205A-1	8	
Bell 412	Indonesia / Canada	Light attack / utility	NBell 412SP / HP / EP / EPI	58	Licensed built by PT DI
Eurocopter Fennec	France	Light attack	AS350-B3 / AS550-C3	6	licensed built by PT DI
Eurocopter Fennec	France	Utility	AS555-AP	6	licensed built by PT DI
MBB Bo 105	Indonesia / Germany	Light attack / utility	NBO-105CB	12	Licensed built by PT DI
Kamov Ka-32	Russia	Transport	Ka-32T	2	
Mil Mi-8M	Russia	Transport	Mi-8AMT	2	Several units under "evaluation" and "operational trials".
Mil Mi-17	Russia	Transport	Mi-17V-5	11	(Note: 12 units (from 2008 to 2011) were delivered according to SIPRI. 3 units has crashed between 2013–2020. 2 units were delivered in July 2026.)
Hughes 300	United States	Rotorcraft trainer	Hughes 300C	20	
UAV
Shield AI MQ-35 V-BAT	United States	Fixed-wing, UAV, ISR Unmanned aerial vehicle, intelligence, surveillance, and reconnaissance		N/A	Used by Kopassus
Alpha A900	Spain	Rotorcraft, UAV, ISR Unmanned aerial vehicle, intelligence, surveillance, and reconnaissance		N/A	Used by the Field Artillery
Elang Laut 25	Indonesia	Fixed-wing, UAV, Surveillance Unmanned aerial vehicle		N/A	Built by Carita Boat Indonesia. Used by the Army Directorate of Topography.

=== Indonesian Naval Aviation ===
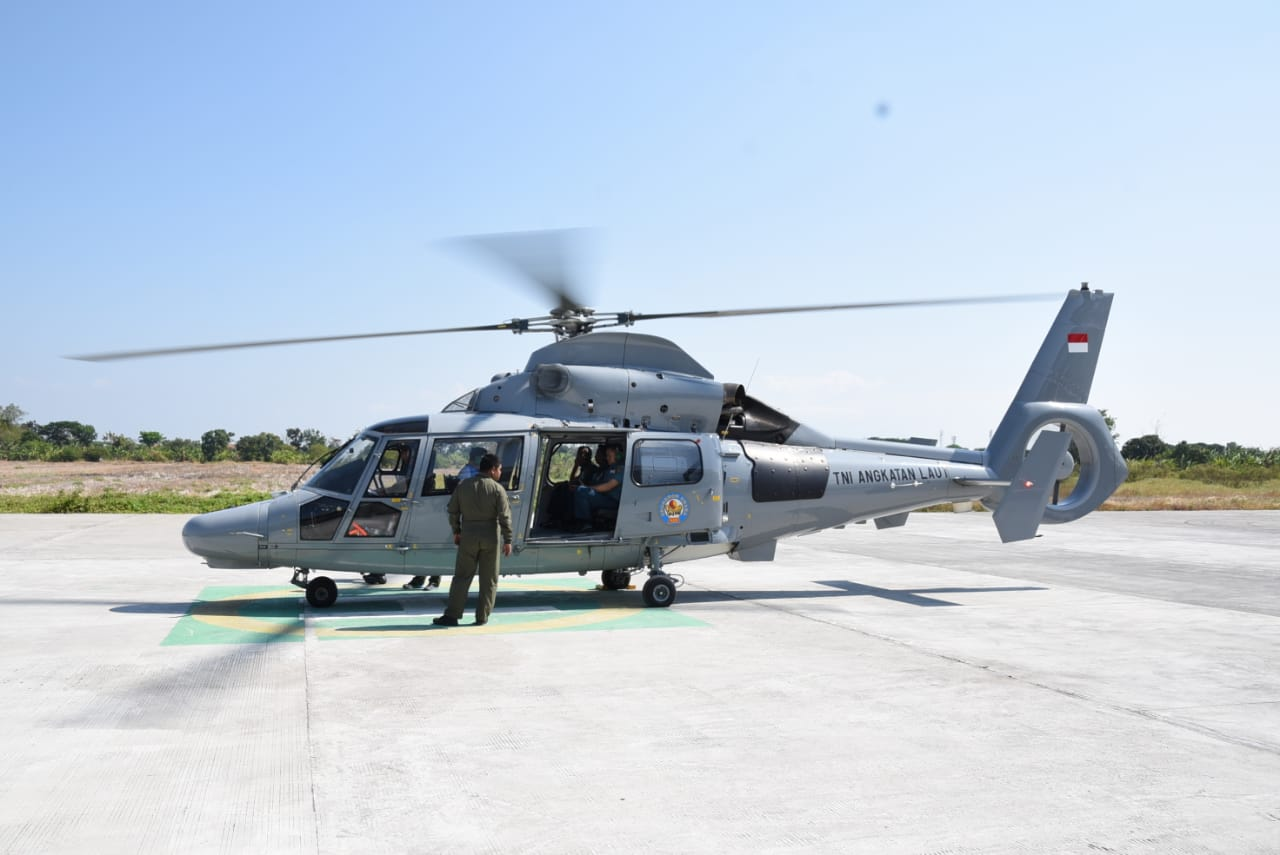
AS565MBe Panther

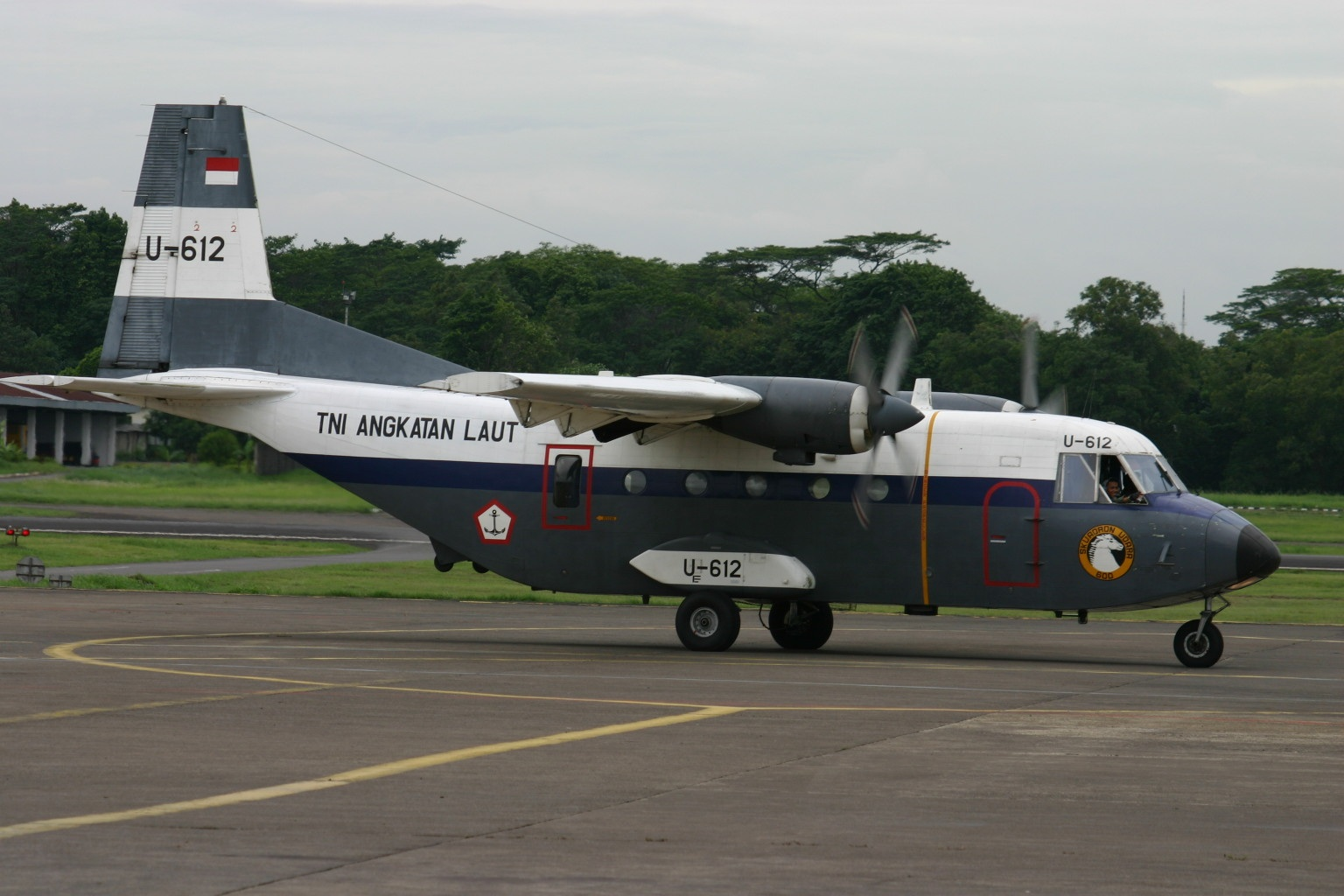
NC212-200M Aviocar

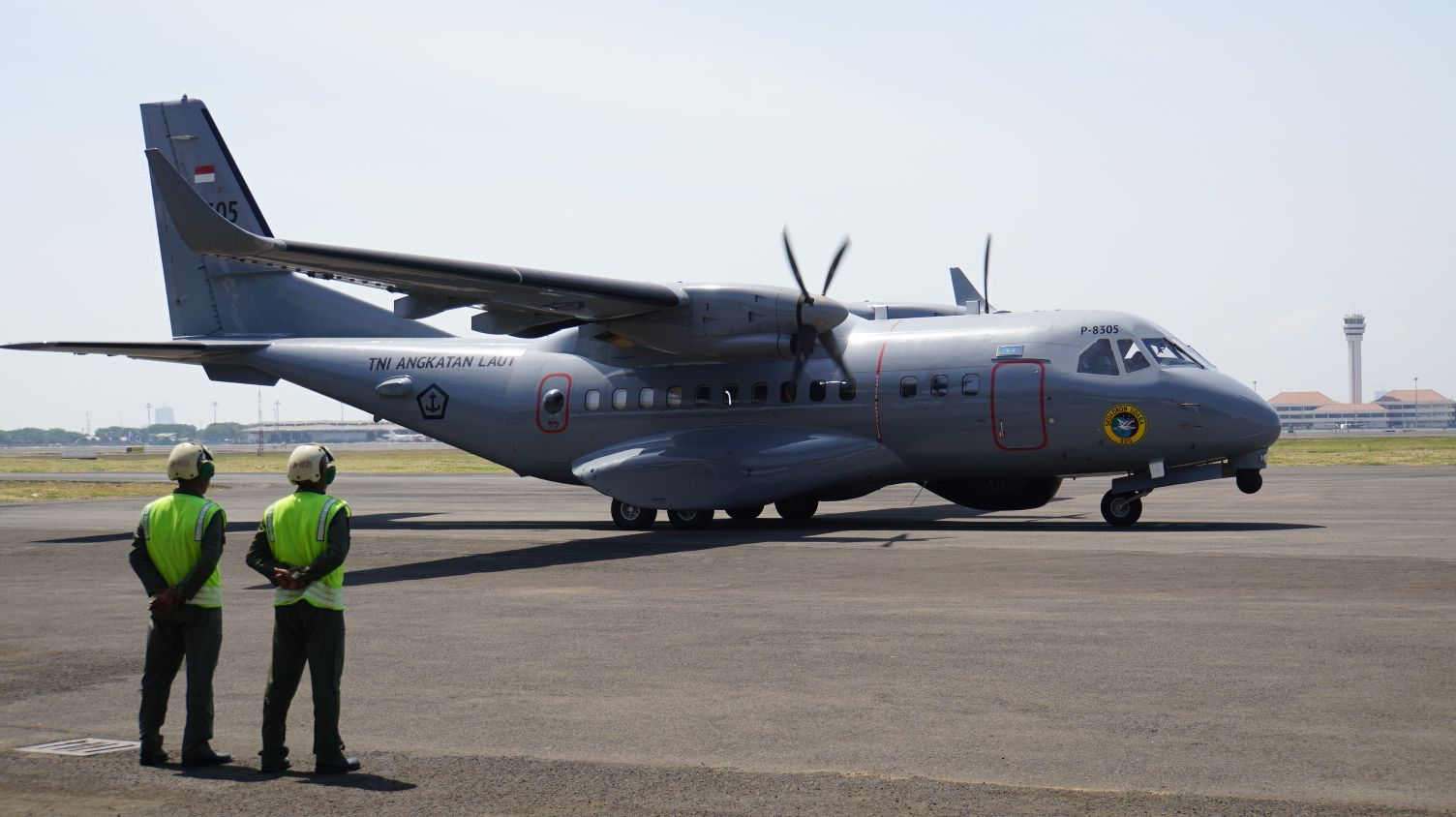
CN235-200 MPA

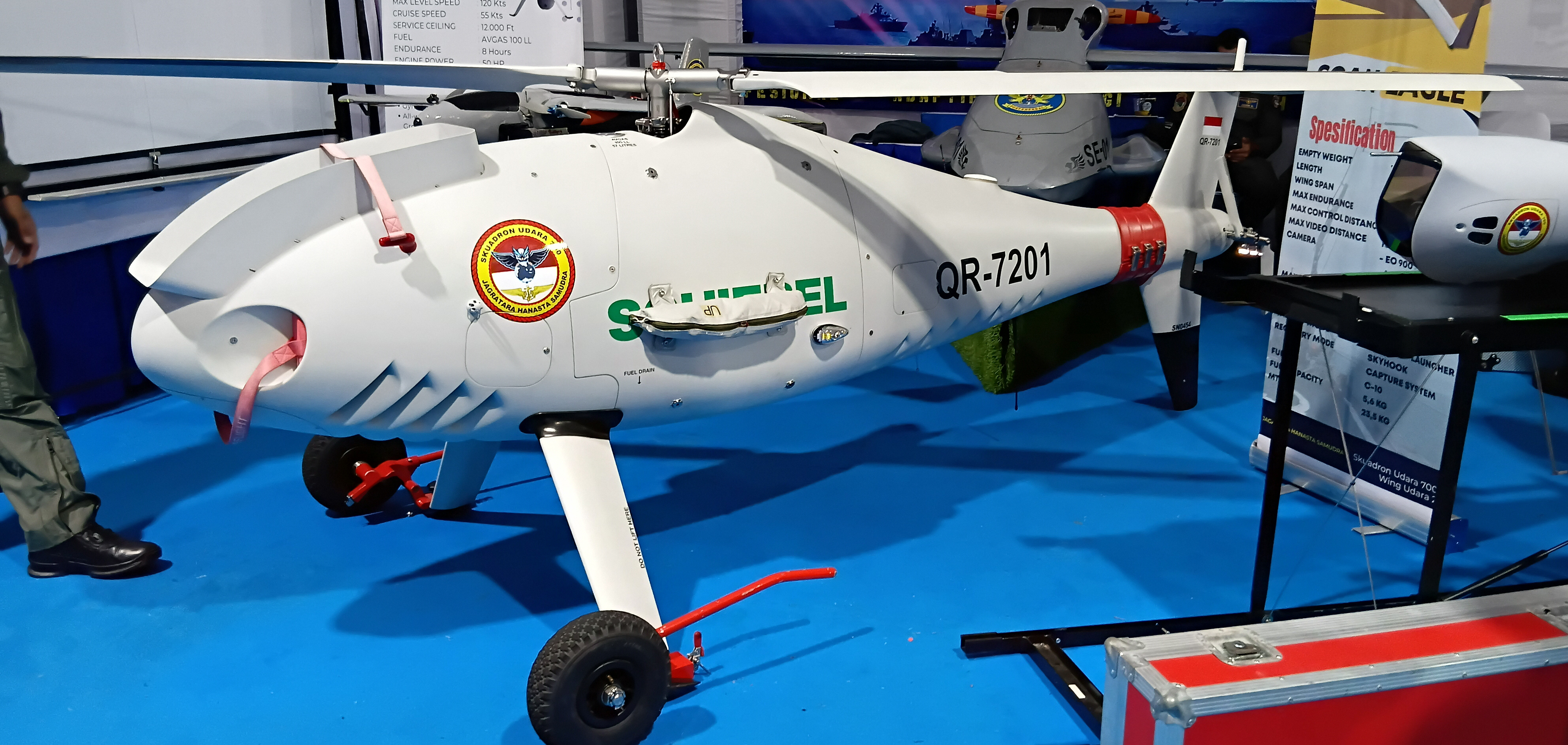
S-100 Camcopter

Aircraft	Origin	Type	Variant	In service	Notes
Fixed-wing aircraft
CASA/IPTN CN-235	Indonesia / Spain	Maritime patrol / tactical airlifter	CN235-220 MPA	6	1 transport variant on order
CASA C-212	Indonesia/Spain	Maritime patrol	C-212 MPA	3	Installed with domestic made FLIR
CASA C-212	Indonesia/Spain	Tactical airlifter	NC212-200M	7	Installed with domestic made FLIR
Vulcanair A-VIATOR	Italy	Maritime patrol / liaison aircraft / basic trainer	AP.68TP-600	0 (+4 on order)	
Beechcraft Super King Air	United States	VIP transport	350i	1	
Beechcraft Baron	United States	Liaison aircraft / basic trainer	G58 Baron	2	
Beechcraft Bonanza	United States	Liaison aircraft / basic trainer	G-36 Bonanza	7	Total of 8, 1 crashed in Madura Strait
Piper PA-28	United States	Ab initio trainer	Piper Archer DX	5	
Helicopters
Eurocopter AS565	France	ASW / SAR / utility	AS565 MBe	11	
Bell 412	Canada	Utility	NBell 412EP	3	licensed produced by Indonesian Aerospace
MBB Bo 105	Germany	Utility	NBO-105	8	
Bell 505 Jet Ranger X	Canada	Rotorcraft trainer		3 (+ 1 on order)	1 on order
UAV
Baykar Bayraktar TB3	Turkey / Indonesia	Fixed wing, HALE, UCAV High-altitude long-endurance, unmanned combat aerial vehicle		0 (+ 60 on order)	Local production
Boeing Insitu ScanEagle	United States	Fixed wing, UAV, ISR Unmanned aerial vehicle, intelligence, surveillance, and reconnaissance	MQ-27B	(+ 14 on order)	14 ordered. Some has been received.
Swarmly Poseidon H10	Cyprus	Fixed wing, UAV, ISR Unmanned aerial vehicle, intelligence, surveillance, and reconnaissance			
Schiebel Camcopter S-100	Austria	Rotorcraft, UAV, ISR Unmanned aerial vehicle, intelligence, surveillance, and reconnaissance			

=== Indonesian Strategic Intelligence Agency ===
Aircraft	Origin	Type	Role	Variant	In service	Notes
Unmanned ISR / ISTAR
CAC Fox	France	Fixed wing UAV Unmanned aerial vehicle	UCAV Unmanned combat aerial vehicle	–	4	
IAI Searcher	Israel	Fixed wing, mini-UAV Mini unmanned aerial vehicle	ISR Intelligence, surveillance, and reconnaissance	Searcher 2	4	Acquired via a Filipino company

== Retired aircraft ==
=== Indonesian Air Force ===
Extended content

Aircraft	Origin	Type	Variant	In service	Notes
Combat aircraft
AC-47 Spooky	United States	Close air support gunship		2	Armed with 3x 12.7mm AN/M3 Browning HMG. It was replaced by OV-10 Bronco and converted into transport aircraft.
A-4 Skyhawk	United States	Fighter	A-4E	31	
B-25 Mitchell	United States	Bomber	C/D/J	42	Ex Royal Netherlands East Indies Army Air Force
B-26 Invader	United States	Bomber	A-26B	6	Supplied by United States under the Mutual Assistance Program.
BAE Hawk	United Kingdom	Light attack aircraft / Lead-in fighter trainer	Hawk 53	20	Replaced by the KAI T-50i Golden Eagle
Bristol Blenheim	United Kingdom	Bomber	Mk IV	1	It was re-engined with Nakajima Sakae engines.
CAC Sabre	Australia	Fighter	Mk.32	23	Variant of the F-86, 24 were delivered, 1 crashed on delivery flight
Ilyushin Il-10	Soviet Union	Attack	Avia B-33	14	Czechoslovak-built B-33. Supplied by Poland, returned to Poland due to poor performance.
Ilyushin Il-28	Soviet Union	Bomber		32	Czechoslovak-built B-228
Kawasaki Ki-48	Japan	Bomber		N/A	Nicknamed "Diponegoro II". At least an aircraft were in service between 1945 and 1948.
Kawasaki Ki-61	Japan	Fighter		N/A	Estimated 6 aircraft were in service in 1946.
Kawanishi N1K	Japan	Floatplane fighter	N1K1	N/A	Estimated 4 aircraft were obtained.
Lavochkin La-11	Soviet Union	Fighter		24	Supplied by People's Republic of China
MiG-17	Soviet Union	Fighter	MiG-17F; MiG-17PF	70	30 units were Czechoslovak-built S-104 and 40 were Polish-built Lim-5P
MiG-19	Soviet Union	Fighter	MiG-19S	35	
MiG-21	Soviet Union	Fighter	MiG-21F-13	26	
Mitsubishi Ki-51	Japan	Bomber		N/A	Nicknamed "Guntei". Estimated 8 aircraft were in service between 1945 and 1949.
Nakajima A6M2-N	Japan	Interceptor / fighter-bomber		N/A	Approximately one or more were obtained
Nakajima B5N	Japan	Torpedo bomber		N/A	Approximately one or more were obtained
Nakajima B6N	Japan	Torpedo bomber		N/A	Approximately one or more were obtained
Nakajima Ki-27	Japan	Fighter		N/A	At least one was known to be in service.
Nakajima Ki-43	Japan	Fighter	Ki-43-II	N/A	Estimated 11 aircraft were in service between 1945 and 1949.
Nakajima Ki-49	Japan	Bomber		N/A	Nicknamed "Diponegoro I". Estimated 2 aircraft were in service between 1945 and 1947.
Northrop F-5	United States	Multirole	F-5E/F Tiger II	16	12 F-5E and 4 F-5F - retired from service
OV-10 Bronco	United States	COIN / surveillance	OV-10F	16	Replaced by the EMB 314 Super Tucano
P-51 Mustang	United States	Fighter-bomber	P-51D/K; Cavalier Mustang II	49	Consisted of ex ML-KNIL P-51D/K and US-supplied Cavalier Mustang II under the Peace Pony programs.
Shenyang J-5	China	Fighter	Type 56	12	
Tupolev Tu-2	Soviet Union	Bomber		12	Supplied by People's Republic of China
Tupolev Tu-16	Soviet Union	Strategic bomber / reconnaissance	Tu-16; Tu-16KS-1 Tu-16R	26	12 Tu-16, 12 Tu-16KS-1, and 2 Tu-16R
Special mission
Cessna 188	United States	Agricultural	188 AgTruck	4	
Grumman HU-16 Albatross	United States	SAR / utility	UF-1	10	Amphibious
Kawanishi H6K	Japan	Flying boat / transport	H6K2-L	1	
Mitsubishi F1M	Japan	Reconnaissance floatplane	F1M2	N/A	
Mitsubishi Ki-46	Japan	Reconnaissance aircraft		N/A	Approximately 21 or more aircraft were obtained
PBY Catalina	United States	SAR / utility	PBY-5A	8	Amphibious aircraft
Pilatus PC-6 Porter	Switzerland	Agricultural	PC-6/B2-H2	5	
Yokosuka E14Y	Japan	Reconnaissance floatplane		N/A	
Transport
Antonov An-12	Soviet Union	Military transport	An-12B	9	
Boeing 707	United States	VIP transport	707-3M1C	1	Ex Pelita Air
Cessna 180	United States	Utility		6	
Cessna 185	United States	Utility		1	
Cessna 206	United States	Utility	T207	5	
Cessna 402	United States	Utility	401A; 402A	7	Five 401A and two 402A
de Havilland Canada DHC-2	Canada	Utility / military transport		1	STOL capable aircraft
de Havilland Canada DHC-3	Canada	Military transport		5	STOL capable aircraft
Douglas C-47	United States	Military transport	C-47A; C-47B	21	
Fokker F27	Netherlands	Military transport	F27-400M	8	
Fokker F28	Netherlands	VIP transport	1000; 3000R; 4000	4	All of the aircraft were ex commercial airliner. (Note: F28-1000 (A-2801) ex Pelita Air; F28-3000R (A-2802 and A-2803) ex Garuda Indonesia; F28-4000 (A-2804) ex Transwisata Prima Aviation) Retired completely in 2017/2018
G-21 Goose	United States	Utility		2	Acquired from Shell in 1957.
HU-16 Albatross	United States	SAR / utility	UF-1	10	Amphibious aircraft
Ilyushin Il-14	Soviet Union	Military transport	Avia-14F	28	Czechoslovak-built Avia 14
Interstate Cadet	United States	Light utility	L-4J	63	
L-12 Electra Junior	United States	Military transport	L-12A	7	Ex Royal Netherlands East Indies Army Air Force
Lockheed C-140 Jetstar	United States	VIP transport	JetStar 6	3	T-1645 "Pancasila", T-17845 "Irian", T-9446 "Sapta Marga"
Lockheed Model 18	United States	Military transport	C-60	10	Handed over upon independence from the Netherlands
Lockheed Super Constellation	United States	VIP transport	L-1049C/H	3	
Mitsubishi Ki-57	Japan	Military transport		N/A	Approximately 3 aircraft were obtained
Noorduyn Norseman	Canada	Utility	UC-64A	1	Ex Royal Netherlands East Indies Army Air Force (Note: c/n 536, Ex USAAF 44-70271, Ex PK-SAM, Ex ML-KNIL T-400)
PA-22 Tri-Pacer	United States	Utility	PA-22-125	N/A	
PA-32 Cherokee	United States	Utility		N/A	
Scottish Aviation Twin Pioneer	United Kingdom	Military transport	Twin Pioneer Series 1	12	Ex Royal Malaysian Air Force
Short SC.7 Skyvan	United Kingdom	Military transport	Skyvan 3M-400	3	
Taylorcraft Auster	United Kingdom	Liaison	Mk III	22	Ex Royal Netherlands East Indies Army Air Force
Helicopters
Aérospatiale SA 321 Super Frelon	France	Transport	SA 321J	1	Was operated by Pelita Air Service.
Aérospatiale SA 330 Puma	France / Indonesia	Transport	NAS 330J	18	Licensed built by Indonesian Aerospace
Bell 47	United States	Utility	Bell 47G-3B-1 "Soloy"	12	
Bell 47	United States	Utility	47J2A Ranger	4	
Bell 204	United States	Utility	Bell 204B	2	
Bell 206	United States	Liaison		2	
Hiller 12	United States	Utility	Hiller 360B	10	
Hughes 500	United States	Utility	500C	12	Ex Pelita Air.
Mil Mi-1	Soviet Union	Utility		8	Polish-built SM-1
Mil Mi-2	Russia	Utility		2	Retired from service
Mil Mi-4	Soviet Union	Utility	Mi-4A	26	
Mil Mi-6	Soviet Union	Transport	Mi-6T	8	
Sikorsky H-34	United States	Transport	VH-34D; UH-34D; UH-34G S-58T	16	A VH-34D were acquired in 1961 as VIP helicopter. Seven UH-34D and three UH-34G ex VNAF were acquired in 1970s. All but three H-34 were converted into S-58T in late 1970's. Further five S-58T were acquired in early 1980's
Sikorsky SH-3 Sea King	United States	VIP transport	S-61V-1	1	Presidential helicopter
Trainer aircraft
A-4 Skyhawk	United States	Conversion trainer	TA-4H/J	4	2 TA-4H and 2 TA-4J were obtained from Israel and United States respectively.
Aero L-29 Delfín	Czechoslovakia	Lead-in fighter trainer		18	
Antonov An-2	Soviet Union	Conversion trainer		1	In service with Indonesian Aero Sport Federation (FASI)
Beechcraft T-34	United States	Advanced trainer	B45; T-34C	40; 25	Forty Model B45 were acquired in 1962-64. Sixteen T-34C were acquired in 1978, while further nine in 1984.
de Havilland Vampire	United Kingdom	Conversion trainer	T.55	8	
FFA AS 202 Bravo	Switzerland	Ab initio trainer	AS 202/18A	40	
Il-28	Soviet Union	Advanced trainer	Il-28U	4	
L-4 Grasshopper	United States	Basic trainer / liaison aircraft	L-4J	63	Ex Royal Netherlands East Indies Army Air Force
LIPNUR Belalang	Indonesia	Basic trainer	NU-90	3	Used briefly by Indonesian Air Force Academy
Mansyu Ki-79	Manchukuo	Basic trainer / liaison aircraft	Ki-79b	N/A	Nicknamed "Nishikoren". At least 9 aircraft were in service between 1945 and 1949.
MiG-15	Soviet Union	Conversion trainer	MiG-15UTI	15	Czechoslovak-built CS-102
North American T-6 Harvard	United States	Advanced trainer	AT-16; T-6G	16; 25	The AT-16s were ex Royal Netherlands East Indies Army Air Force. Twenty five T-6G were bought from US in 1950.
Lockheed T-33	United States	Advanced trainer / light attack aircraft	T-33A	12	
Pazmany PL-1	United States	Ab initio trainer	PL-2	30	Locally-built as Lipnur LT-200
PZL-104 Wilga	Poland	Basic trainer / utility	Wilga 32	18	Locally-built as Lipnur Gelatik
PZL TS-8 Bies	Poland	Basic trainer		2	
SIAI-Marchetti SF.260	Italy	Advanced trainer	SF.260M/W	18	Received from RSAF
Tachikawa Ki-9	Japan	Advanced trainer		N/A	Approximately 6 aircraft were obtained
Tachikawa Ki-55	Japan	Advanced trainer		N/A	Nicknamed "Cukiu". At least 25 aircraft were in service between 1945 and 1949.
Vultee BT-13 Valiant	United States	Basic trainer		45	
Yokosuka K5Y	Japan	Advanced trainer / bomber	K5Y1	N/A	Nicknamed "Cureng". At least 20 aircraft were in service between 1945 and 1949.
