= Indonesian Maritime Security Agency =

Indonesia Maritime Security Agency Badan Keamanan Laut Republik Indonesia
- Racing stripe

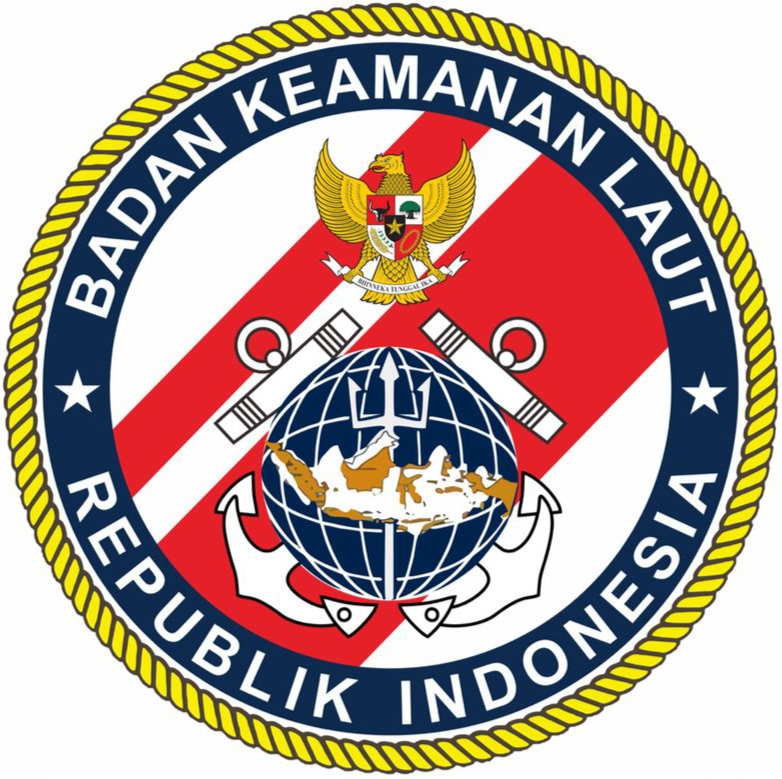
- Logo

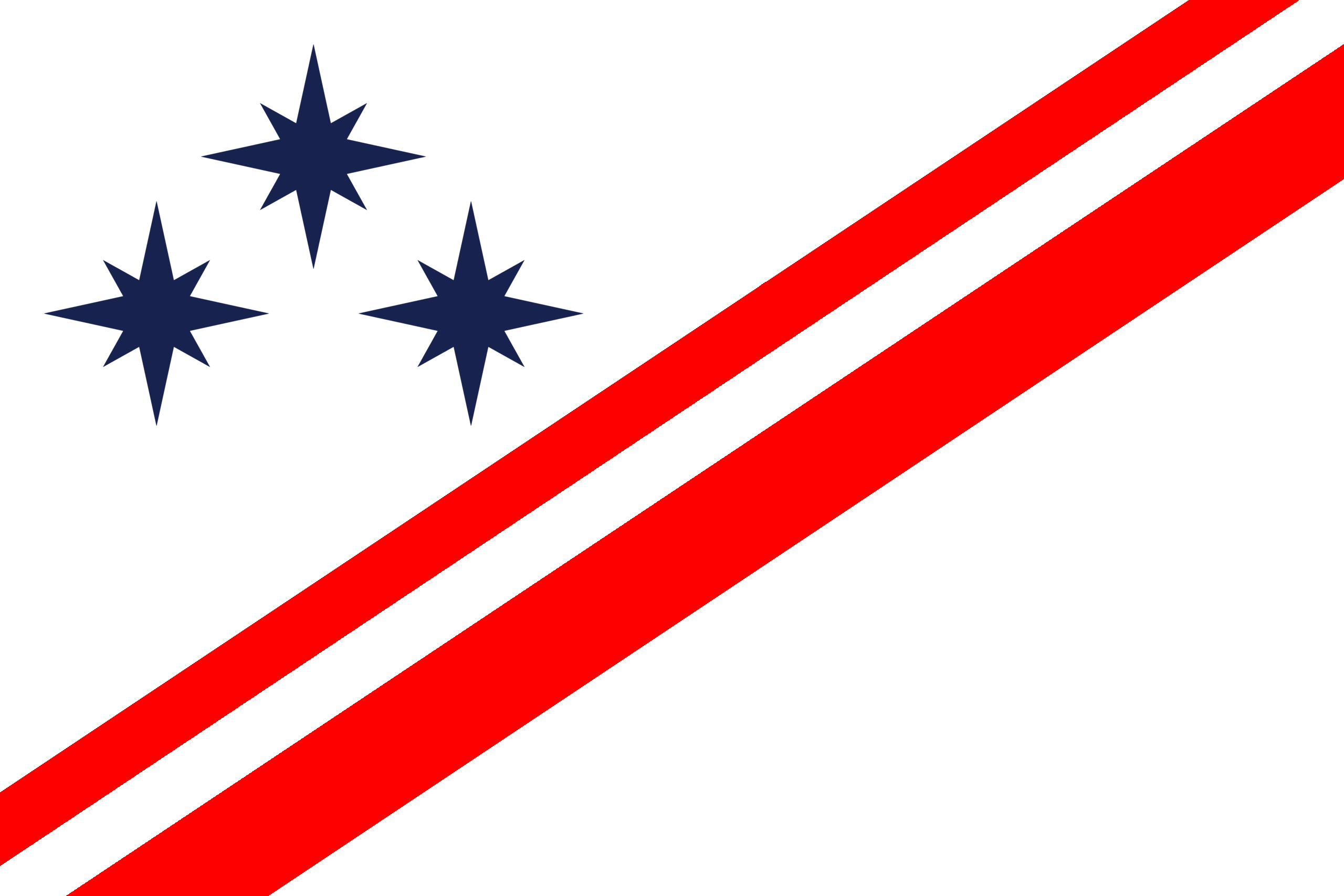
- Ensign
- Abbreviation: Bakamla
- Motto: Raksamahiva Camudresu Nusantarasya (Sanskrit) "We are The Guardian of Nusantara's Ocean"

Agency overview
- Formed: 8 December 2014; 11 years ago
- Preceding agency: Badan Koordinasi Keamanan Laut Republik Indonesia
- Employees: 1,354 personnel (2024)
- Annual budget: Rp 1,650,700,000,000 (2026)

Jurisdictional structure
- National agency (Operations jurisdiction): Indonesia
- Operations jurisdiction: Indonesia
- Legal jurisdiction: Indonesian Maritime Zone; Exclusive Economic Zone of Indonesia
- Governing body: Government of Indonesia
- Constituting instrument: Peraturan Presiden Nomor 178 Tahun 2014
- Specialist jurisdiction: Coastal patrol, marine border protection, marine search and rescue

Operational structure
- Headquarters: Jalan Proklamasi No.56, Jakarta Pusat, Jakarta
- Elected officer responsible: Djamari Chaniago, Coordinating Minister for Political, Legal, and Security Affairs
- Agency executive: Vice Admiral Irvansyah, Head of Bakamla
- Parent agency: Coordinating Ministry for Political and Security Affairs

Website
- bakamla.go.id

The Indonesian Maritime Security Agency (Indonesian: Badan Keamanan Laut Republik Indonesia, Bakamla) is a maritime patrol and rescue agency of the Republic of Indonesia. Bakamla is a non-ministerial government institution which reports directly to the President through Coordinating Ministry for Political and Security Affairs. Bakamla's duty is to conduct security and safety patrols in the territorial waters of Indonesia and the jurisdiction of Indonesia including in the Exclusive Economic Zone of Indonesia under the international law of UNCLOS 1982. Previously Bakamla was a non-structural institution called the Coordinating Agency for the Security of the Republic of Indonesia (Badan Koordinasi Keamanan Laut Republik Indonesia – Bakorkamla). The agency is not part or associated with the Indonesian National Armed Forces, although its top-ranking leadership are handpicked from the Indonesian Navy. Bakamla and the Indonesian Navy, however, often conduct exercises and joint-operation together. While during search-and-rescue operations, Bakamla also conduct joint-operations with the National Search and Rescue Agency.

President Joko Widodo officially announced the establishment of Bakamla to coincide with the 2014 Nusantara Day celebration held in Kotabaru, South Kalimantan. During the occasion, the President mentioned that Bakamla would be coordinated by the Coordinating Minister for Politics, Law and Security. Meanwhile, in the management and utilization of marine resources, Coordinating Minister for Political and Security Affairs would coordinate with the Coordinating Minister for the Ministry of Maritime Affairs.

Bakamla is not associated with the Indonesian Sea and Coast Guard Unit (Kesatuan Penjagaan Laut dan Pantai Republik Indonesia - KPLP). While the former is under the jurisdiction of the Coordinating Ministry for Political and Security Affairs, the latter is under the jurisdiction of the Ministry of Transportation. Both of them however has similar roles and functions.

== History ==
Maritime Security Coordinating Board (Badan Koordinasi Keamanan Laut) initially had been formed in 1972 through a joint decree of the Minister of Defense and Security / Commander of the Armed Forces, Ministry of Communications, Ministry of Finance, Minister of Justice and Attorney General, No. KEP/B/45/XII/1972; SK/901/M/1972; KEP.779/MK/III/12/1972; J.S.8 /72/1; KEP-085/J.A/12/1972 on the Establishment of Marine Safety Coordinating Board and the Joint Command Operations Marine Safety.

Due to changes on governance and development of the strategic environment in 2003, Maritime Security Coordinating Board requires refreshment to improve coordination among various government agencies in the field of maritime security. Hence, Coordinating Minister for Political and Security Affairs issued decree, No. KEP.05 / Menko / Polkam / 2/2003, of establishment of a working group Development Planning security and Law Enforcement at Sea. And through a series of seminars and cross-sectoral coordination meeting, then on 29 December 2005, it was determined the Presidential Decree No. 81 Year 2005 on Maritime Security Coordinating Board as the legal basis of the Maritime Security Coordinating Board.

Following the enactment of Article 59 (3) Law No. 32 Year 2014 concerning the Marine, Bakorkamla officially renamed the Maritime Security Agency or Badan Kemananan Laut (Bakamla). Legal basis for Bakamla was then reinforced by the issuance of Presidential Decree No. 178 of 2014 on Maritime Security Agency.

Before 2022, there are multiple maritime law enforcement agencies in Indonesia which tend to have overlap authority between one another in the maritime zone of the country. In March 2022, the government issue new regulation to designate Bakamla as coordinating body for all maritime law enforcement agencies.

Although Bakamla has always referred to itself as Indonesian Coast Guard through its insignia on uniforms, assets and social medias, there are no regulation or law that explicitly state that Bakamla as a "coast guard". The latest regulation in 2022 only refer Bakamla as the "Agency" without assigning it the role of a coast guard. This issue has become more contentious following the 2024 revision of Law No. 17/2008 on Shipping, which designates the Indonesian Sea and Coast Guard (KPLP) as the sole coast guard authority. This designation has led to legal conflicts between KPLP and Bakamla, the latter having already used the title "Indonesian Coast Guard" despite lacking formal recognition. Such conflicts raise concerns about the clarity of maritime law enforcement roles and the effectiveness of Indonesia’s maritime operations both domestically and in the context of international cooperation.

== Function ==
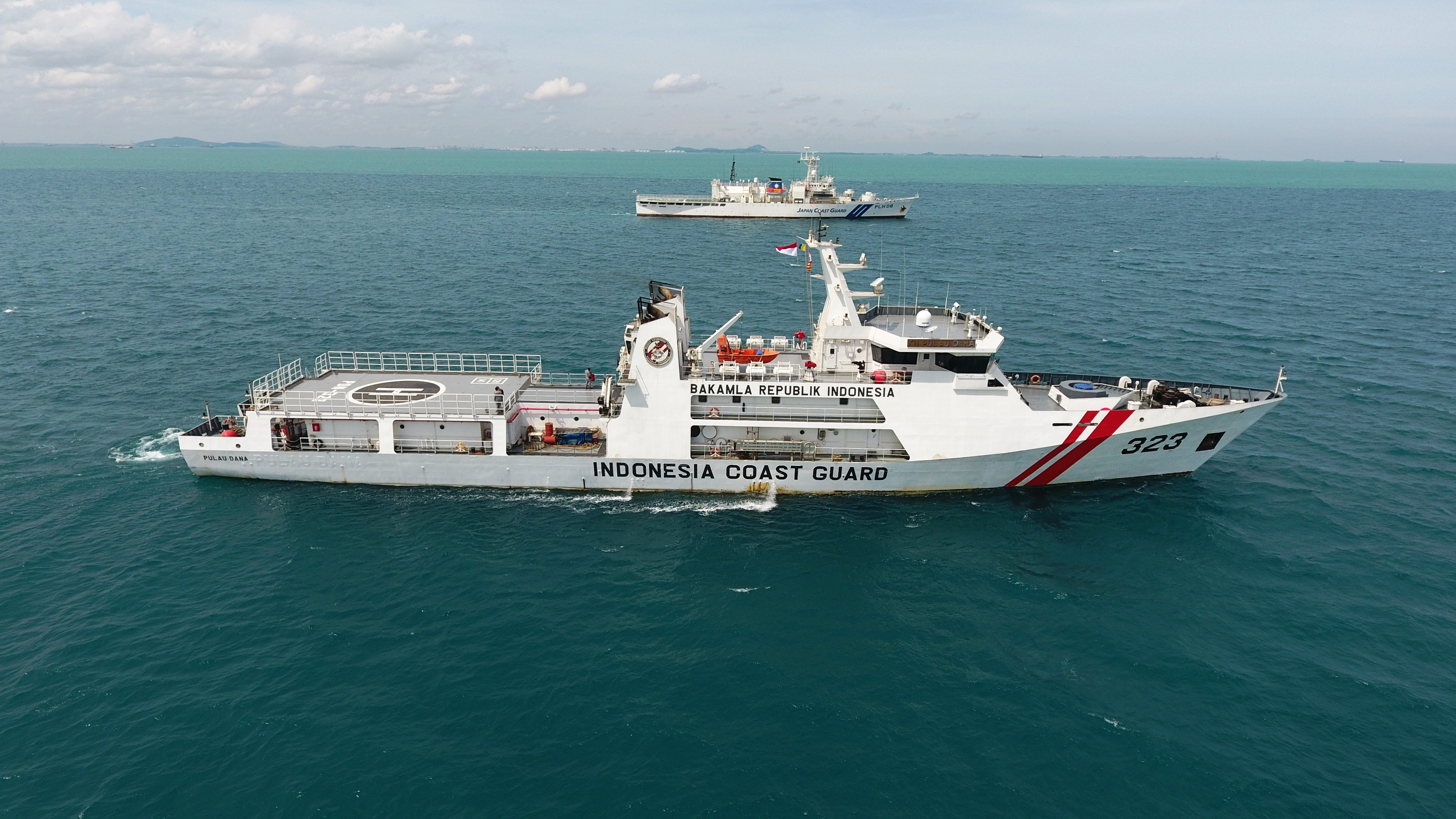
Bakamla patrol ship KN Pulau Dana (323) and Japan Coast Guard (JCG) ship Echigo (PLH-08) conducted joint anti-piracy exercises in the Singapore Strait on 2 February 2022.

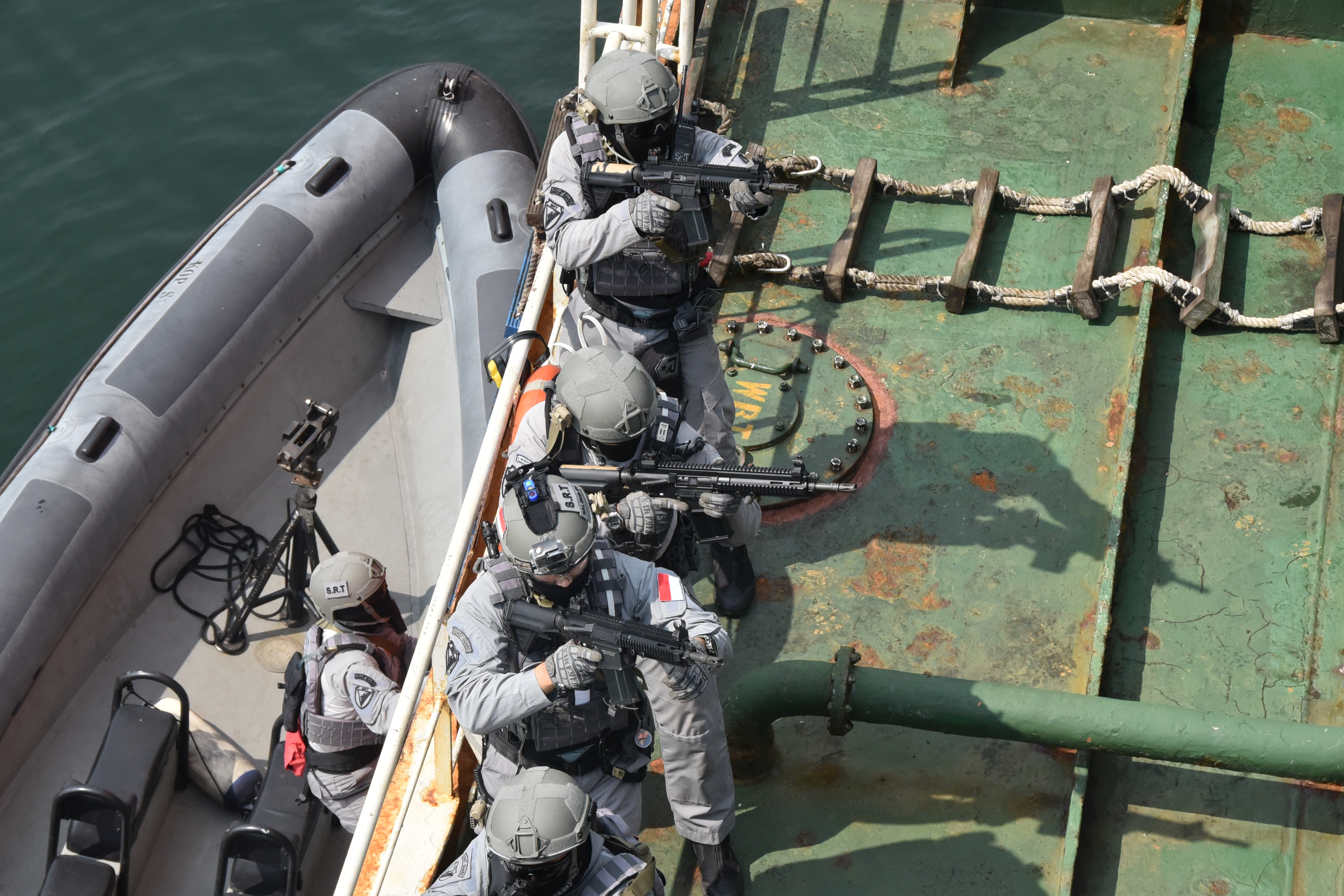
Bakamla Special Response Team (SRT) personnel conducted visit, board, search, and seizure (VBSS) exercise.

The task of Bakamla is to conduct security and safety patrols in the territorial waters of Indonesia and the jurisdiction of Indonesia.

- Establish national policies in the field of security and safety in the territorial waters of Indonesia and the jurisdiction of Indonesia;
- Organize security and safety early warning systems in Indonesian waters and jurisdiction areas;
- Carry out safeguards, supervision, prevention and prosecution of law violations in the territorial waters of Indonesia and the jurisdiction of Indonesia;
- Coordinate and monitor the execution of water patrol with relevant agencies;
- Provide technical and operational support to related institutions;
- Provide search and rescue assistance in the territorial waters of Indonesia and the territory of Indonesian jurisdiction;

According to Article 63 Law No. 32/2014 on Marine Affairs, Bakamla has the authority to:

1. conduct an immediate pursuit;
2. dismiss, examine, arrest, carry, and deliver vessels to relevant authorities for further legal process execution; and
3. synergize the information system of security and safety in the territorial waters of Indonesia and the jurisdiction of Indonesia.

== Organisation ==
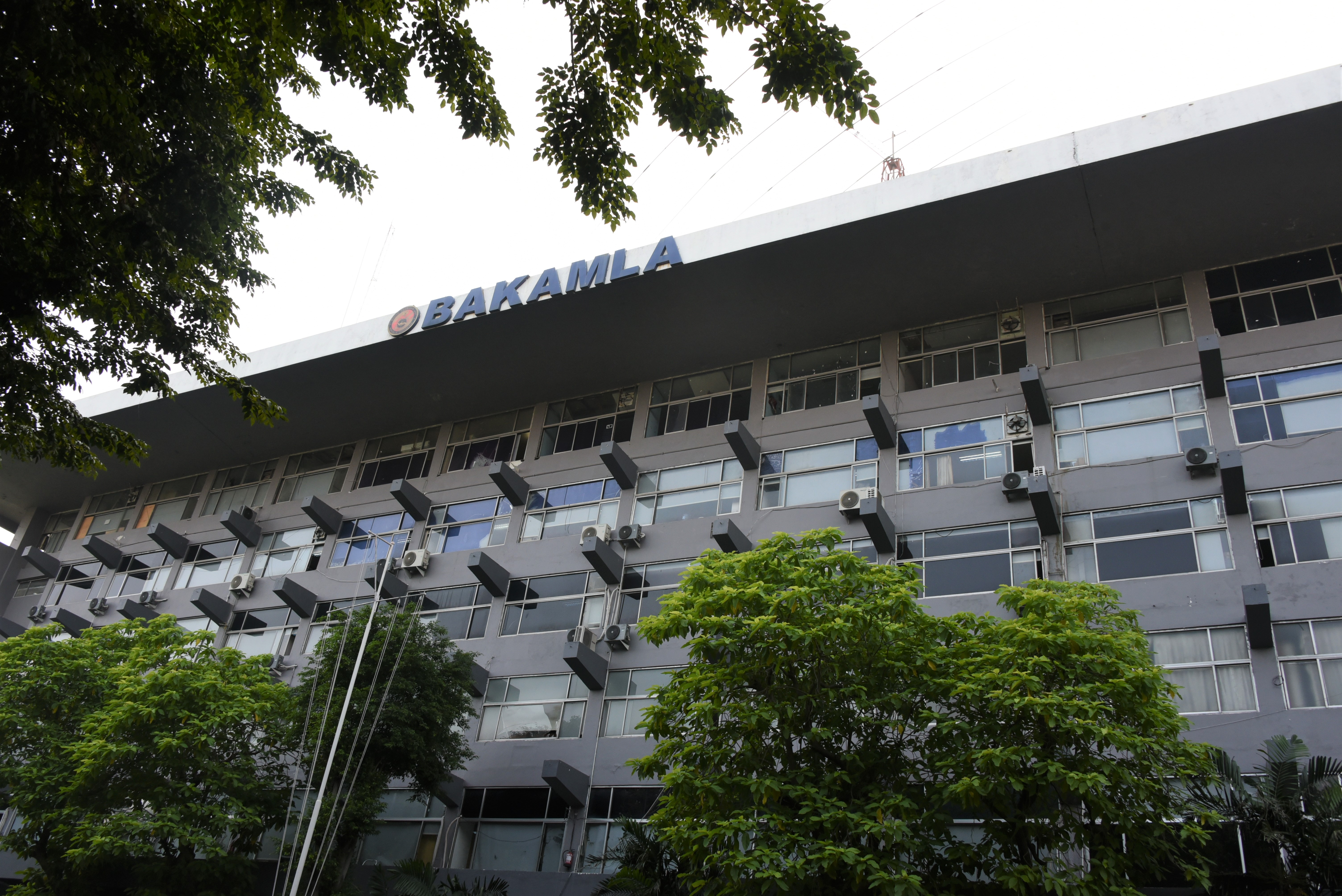
Bakamla headquarters building.

According to presidential decree No. 178/ 2014, the organisation structure of the BAKAMLA comprises the following components:

- Head of Bakamla
    - Law Enforcement Unit
    - Inspectorate
    - Task Forces
  - Secretary of Bakamla
    - Bureau of Planning and Organization
    - Bureau of General Affairs
    - Bureau of Infrastructure
  - Deputy of Information, Law and Cooperation.
    - Directorate of Data and Information
    - Directorate of Law
    - Directorate of Cooperation
  - Deputy of Operation and Training
    - Directorate of Naval Operation
    - Directorate of Naval Aviation Operation
    - Directorate of Training
  - Deputy of Policy and Strategy
    - Directorate of Marine Security Policy
    - Directorate of Marine Security Strategy
    - Directorate of Marine Security Research and Development
  - Head of Western Maritime Zone Office
  - Head of Central Maritime Zone Office
  - Head of Eastern Maritime Zone Office

=== Academy ===
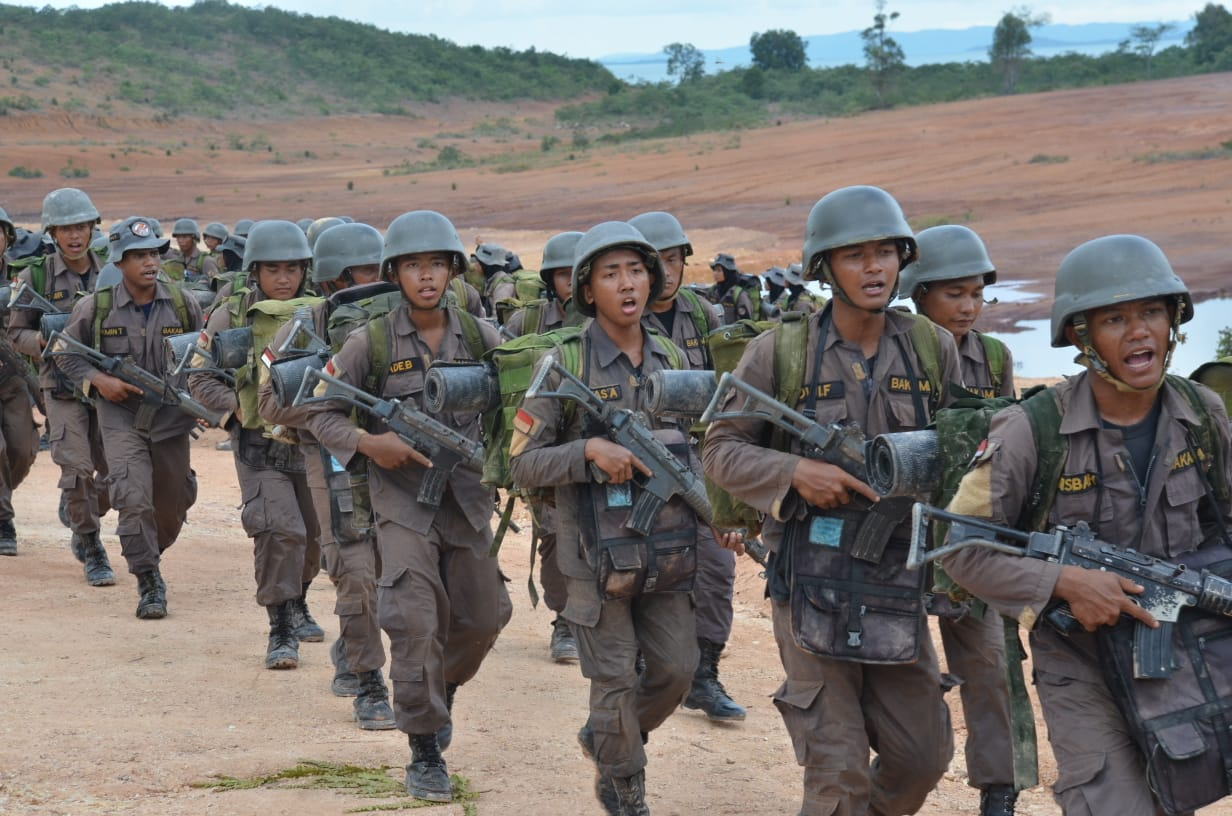
Bakamla paramilitary forces during a training.

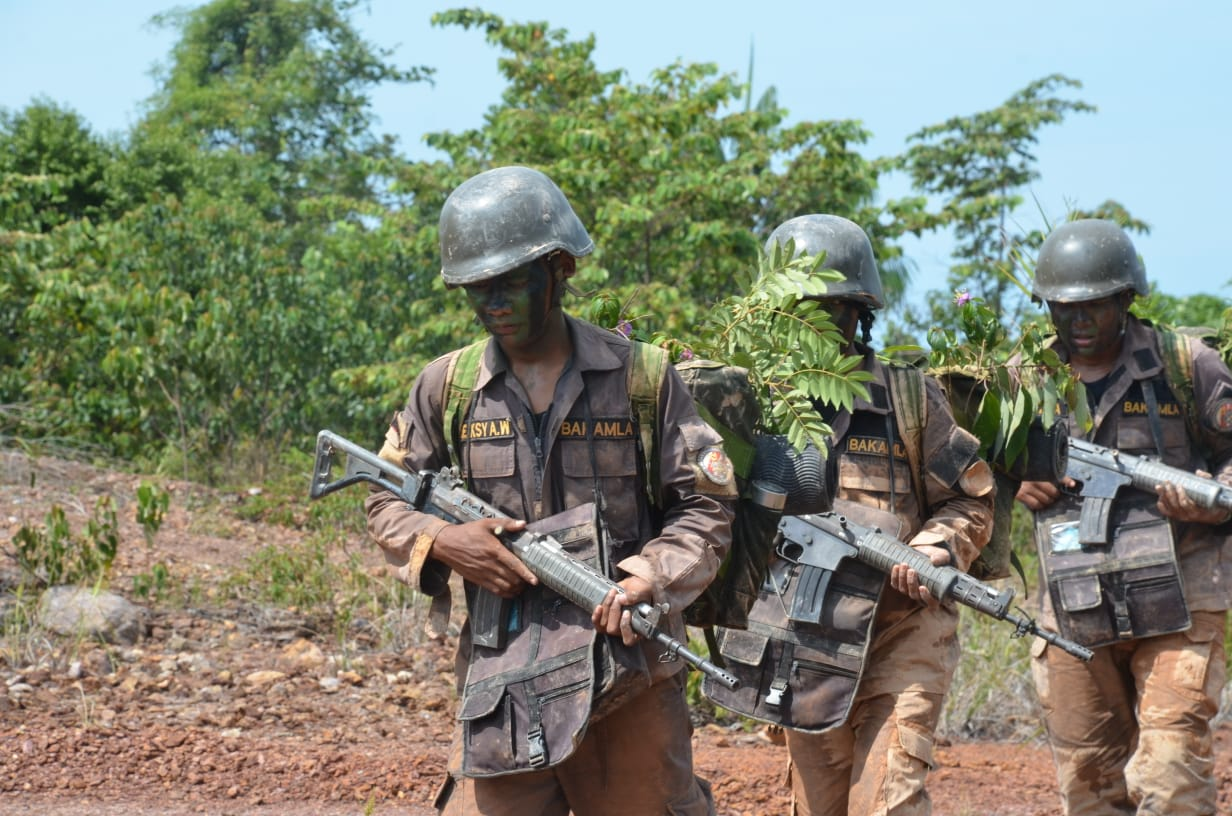
Bakamla paramilitary forces during a training.

The Marine Safety and Security Academy (Akademi Keselamatan dan Keamanan Laut, AKKL) is the main training institute for Bakamla candidates. The academy is located within the area of Naval Doctrine, Education, and Training Development Command (Kodiklatal), Bumimoro, Surabaya. The AKKL (Marine Safety and Security Academy) is a breakthrough of Bakamla in preparing qualified human resources in the field of marine security and marine education for three years.

AKKL is paramilitary academy and its graduates will get diploma certificate, the establishment of AAKL is due to cooperation between Bakamla and the Navy. AKKL's campus is located inside the Kodiklatal for Dormitory and Classroom, and the early warning system skill laboratory is located at Naval Academy (AAL) Bumi Moro, Moro Krembangan, Surabaya. The requirements to become AKKL cadets are as followse: male with age 22 years or below, high school graduate, physically and mentally fit, proven to have good behaviour and passed the selection test.

=== Operational areas ===
The operational area of Bakamla is the Indonesian Maritime Zone which is divided into three maritime zones:

1. Western Maritime Zone (Zona Maritim Barat) - Headquartered in Batam, Riau Islands. This maritime zone oversees areas of western Indonesia such as the islands of Java, Sumatra and Kalimantan.
2. Central Maritime Zone (Zona Maritim Tengah) - Headquartered in Manado, North Sulawesi. This maritime zone oversees areas of central Indonesia such as Sulawesi and the Lesser Sunda Islands.
3. Eastern Maritime Zone (Zona Maritim Timur) - Headquartered in Ambon, Maluku. This maritime zone oversees areas of eastern Indonesia such as Maluku and Papua.

In the future, Bakamla will increase the base or maritime zone spread over Indonesian waters by building seven more maritime zones to support the marine security sector. Seven maritime zones to be built in North Sumatra, West Sumatra, Cilacap, Makassar, Balikpapan, Natuna, Sorong, and Merauke. Each maritime base will have long-range radar stations and satellites to support operations. In addition, it will also be equipped with surveillance equipment and information from the satellite, which can monitor anyone entering Indonesian waters.

== Equipment ==
=== Vessels ===
All vessels of Bakamla are named with the prefix KN (Kapal Negara or State Ship). Smaller sized boats with light armaments do not make use of the prefix, and instead are only identifiable by their number. All vessels are built by local shipyards such as Palindo Marine and Citra Shipyard.

Patrol Vessels (22)
Class	Picture	Units	Length	Type	Builders	Ships	Origin	Note
Tanjung Datu class		1	110 meters	Offshore Patrol Vessel	Palindo Marine	KN Tanjung Datu (301)	Indonesia	In active service.
Pulau Nipah class		3	80 meters	Offshore Patrol Vessel	Citra Shipyard	KN Pulau Nipah (321) KN Pulau Marore (322) KN Pulau Dana (323)	Indonesia	In active service.
Bintang Laut class		6	48 meters	Coastal Patrol Vessel	Palindo Marine	KN Bintang Laut (401)	Indonesia	In active service.
Bintang Laut class		6	48 meters	Coastal Patrol Vessel	Citra Shipyard	KN Singa Laut (402)	Indonesia	In active service.
Bintang Laut class		6	48 meters	Coastal Patrol Vessel	Batam Expresindo Shipyard	KN Kuda Laut (403)	Indonesia	In active service.
Bintang Laut class		6	48 meters	Coastal Patrol Vessel	Pahala Harapan Lestari	KN Gajah Laut (404)	Indonesia	In active service.
Bintang Laut class		6	48 meters	Coastal Patrol Vessel	Palindo Marine	KN Ular Laut (405)	Indonesia	In active service.
Bintang Laut class		6	48 meters	Coastal Patrol Vessel	Karimun Anugrah Sejati	KN Belut Laut (406)	Indonesia	In active service.
X38 Patrol Catamaran		8	12 meters	Catamaran hulled Patrol boat	North Sea Boats	boats (501 – 508)	Indonesia	In active service.
High Speed Craft (HSC)		4	14.30 meters	Patrol boat	Palindo Marine	boats (32-01 – 32-04)	Indonesia	In active service.
Tactical Vessels (10)
Rigid-Hulled Inflatable Boat (RHIB)		10	9 – 12 meters	Patrol boat	-	boats (87-02 – 87-11)	Indonesia	In active service.

=== Aircraft ===
In 2022, Bakamla confirmed it operated four Alpha 900 helicopter drones developed by the Spanish firm Alpha Unmanned Systems. The drones operate from the flight decks of the 110 m Tanjung Datu and 80 m Pulau Nipah-class offshore patrol vessels.

As of February 2025, Bakamla also operates one NC-212-200 maritime surveillance aircraft which it leases from Transwisata Prima Aviation, using the registration PK-TWW.

=== Weapon systems ===
Name	Origin	Type	Version	Used by	Notes
Aselsan SMASH	Turkey	Remote controlled weapon station	SMASH 30×173mm	Tanjung Datu-class Pulau Nipah-Class Bintang Laut-Class	
Pindad SM5	Singapore Indonesia	Heavy machine gun	12.7x99mm NATO	Tanjung Datu-Class Pulau Nipah-Class Bintang Laut-Class	

=== Small arms ===
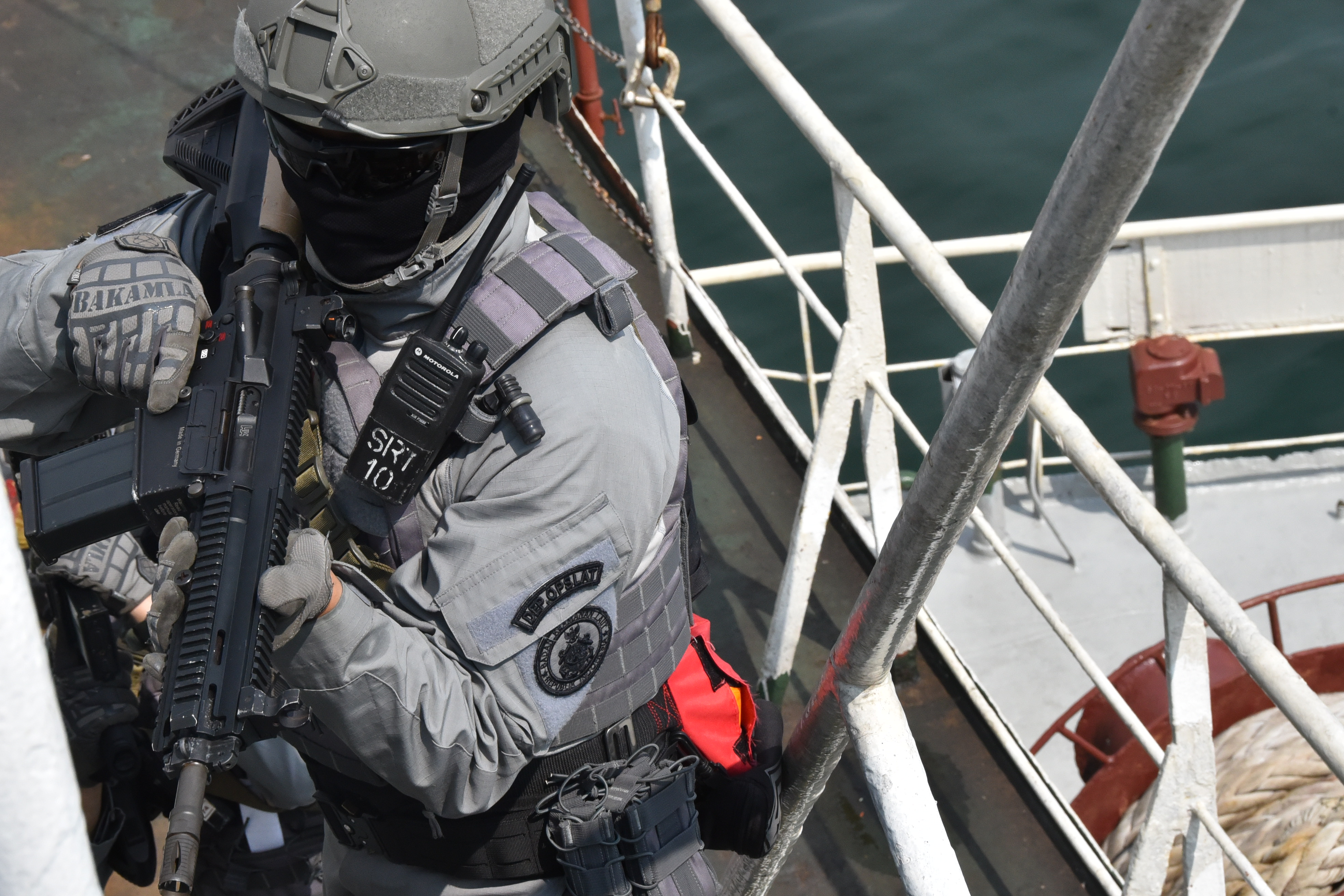
Bakamla Special Response Team (SRT) personnel equipped with HK416 assault rifle.

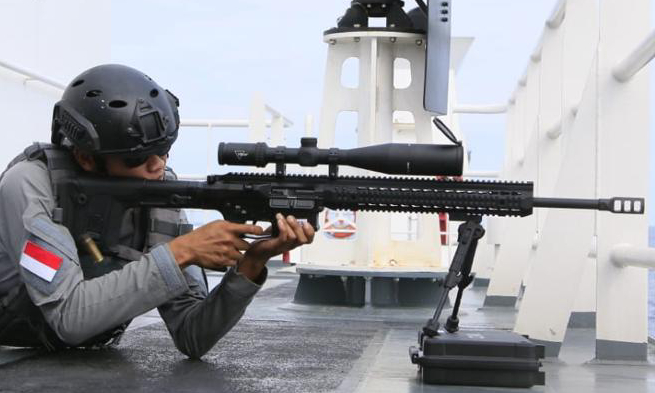
Bakamla Special Response Team (SRT) personnel equipped with DSSR762 designated marksman rifle.

Name	Origin	Type	Caliber	Variant	Note
Canik TP9	Turkey	Semi-automatic pistol	9x19mm Parabellum	Elite S2	
Beretta APX	Italy	Semi-automatic pistol	9x19mm Parabellum	APX A0	
Heckler & Koch USP	Germany	Semi-automatic pistol	9x19mm Parabellum	USP	
SIG Sauer P226	Germany	Semi-automatic pistol	9x19mm Parabellum	P226	
CZ Scorpion EVO 3	Czech Republic	Submachine gun	9x19mm Parabellum	A1	
DSAR-15	South Korea	Assault rifle	5.56x45mm NATO	DSAR-15P	
HK416	Germany	Assault rifle	5.56x45mm NATO	HK416	
HK417	Germany	Designated marksman rifle	7.62×51mm NATO	G28	
DSSR762	South Korea	Designated marksman rifle	7.62×51mm NATO		
Minimi	Belgium Indonesia	Light machine gun	5.56x45mm NATO	SM3	
Pindad SM2	Belgium Indonesia	General purpose machine gun	7.62×51mm NATO	SM2 V2	

== Procurement ==
=== Vessels ===
In March 2024, Bakamla and the Japanese government concluded a grant agreement for the provision of a single offshore patrol vessel. This was followed by the signing of a procurement contract in December 2024, marking the formal implementation of the grant. The vessel is being constructed in Japan by Mitsubishi Shipbuilding with financing provided through the Japan International Cooperation Agency (JICA), and is scheduled for completion in 2027.

In October 2025, Bakamla confirmed discussions related to the project, including vessel specifications and follow-up arrangements. The vessel, measuring 85.6 meters in length, is designed to accommodate a crew of 70 personnel and has a maximum speed of 22 knots. The discussions also covered training programs and technical cooperation under JICA-facilitated cooperation frameworks.

=== Aircraft ===
In October 2025, Indonesian Aerospace (PTDI) confirmed the procurement of four N219 Maritime Surveillance Aircraft by Bakamla to support national maritime patrol and surveillance operations.

The procurement package includes a five-year fleet readiness and after-sales support program, covering maintenance, repair and overhaul services, training, technical assistance, and technical documentation.

== Rank structure ==
The Bakamla uses a similar ranking system and insignia with Indonesian Navy. The difference between navy and Bakamla rank are the usage of special title (Bakamla uses special title of "BAKAMLA" for every personnel, while navy uses "(TNI)" for high-ranking officer and branch/corps abbreviation for other officer and enlisted personnel) and Bakamla does not have a rank higher than a Vice admiral (Laksamana Madya) as that is the rank of the head of the agency. Indonesian National Armed Forces personnel, Indonesian National Police personnel or other civil servant who are assigned to Bakamla are given Bakamla rank which are correspond to his/her original rank.

Bakamla Seaman rank sleeves are slanted in navy blue unlike the Navy's straight stripes, a tradition introduced from the US Coast Guard.

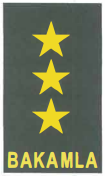
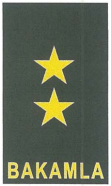
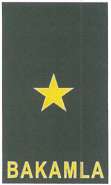
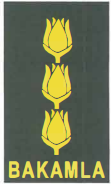
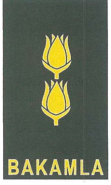
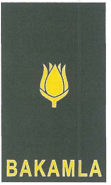
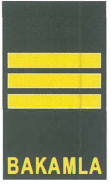
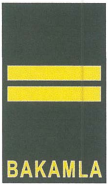
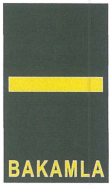
Rank group	General/flag officers			Senior officers			Junior officers
Indonesian Maritime Security Agency
Indonesian Maritime Security Agency	Laksamana madya bakamla	Laksamana muda bakamla	Laksamana pertama bakamla	Kolonel bakamla	Letnan kolonel bakamla	Mayor bakamla	Kapten bakamla	Letnan satu bakamla	Letnan dua bakamla

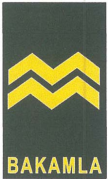
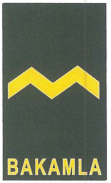
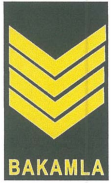
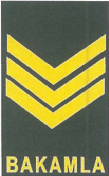
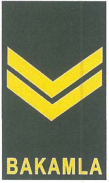
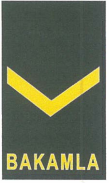
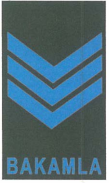
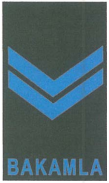
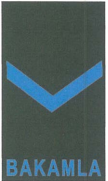
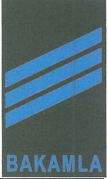
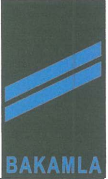
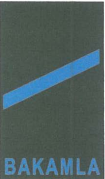
Rank group	Senior NCOs						Junior NCOs			Enlisted
Indonesian Maritime Security Agency
Indonesian Maritime Security Agency	Pembantu letnan satu bakamla	Pembantu letnan dua bakamla	Sersan mayor bakamla	Sersan kepala bakamla	Sersan satu bakamla	Sersan dua bakamla	Kopral kepala bakamla	Kopral satu bakamla	Kopral dua bakamla	Kelasi kepala bakamla	Kelasi satu bakamla	Kelasi dua bakamla
