= Tanjung Datu-class patrol vessel =

Class of Indonesian patrol vessel

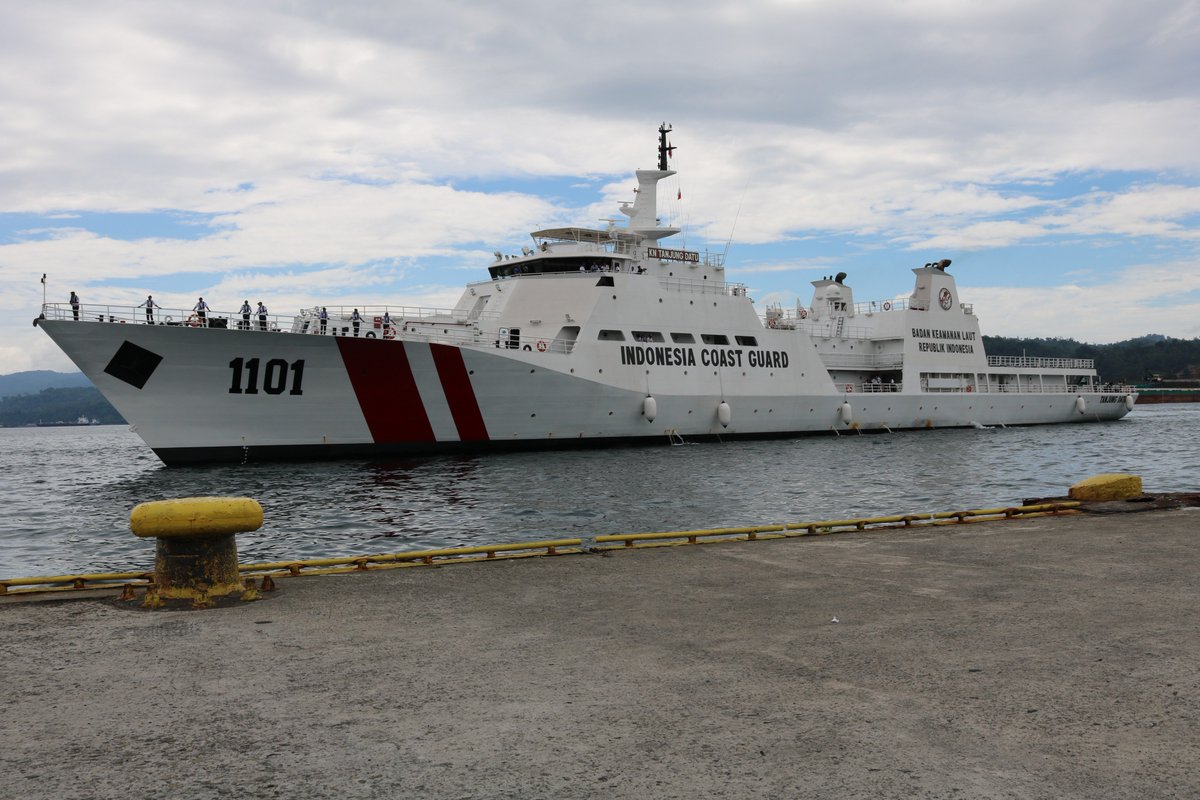
- KN Tanjung Datu (1101), photographed 23 March 2018

Class overview
- Builders: Palindo Marine
- Cost: Rp208 billion (2015) or US$17 million (2021)
- Built: 2016–present
- In service: 2018–present
- In commission: 2018
- Planned: 12
- Building: 4
- Completed: 1
- Active: 1

General characteristics
- Class & type: Patrol boat/OPV
- Displacement: 2400 tons
- Length: 110 m (360 ft) overall
- Beam: 15.5 m (50 ft 10 in)
- Propulsion: 2 × 5300 hp engine; 4 × 250 kW diesel generator
- Speed: 20 knots (37 km/h) maximum, 15 knots (28 km/h) cruise speed
- Range: 4,630 km (2,500 nmi) at 12 knots (22 km/h)
- Endurance: 14 days
- Boats & landing craft carried: 3 × RHIB
- Capacity: 56 additional person
- Crew: 76 person
- Armament: 1 × 30 mm Aselsan SMASH 200/30 remote controlled weapon station (RCWS); Pindad SM5 12.7 mm HMG; Water cannon
- Aviation facilities: 1 × helipad and hangar
- Notes: References

Tanjung Datu-class patrol vessel is a class of patrol boat operated by Bakamla (Indonesian Maritime Security Agency).

== History ==
Tanjung Datu-class ship was built by PT Palindo Marine beginning on 15 March 2016. The construction took 636 days to complete. It is officially in service in Monday, 18 January 2018.

On 13 December 2020, KN Tanjung Datu saved a Chinese fishing ship adrift in the North Natuna Sea. The ship, Lu Rong Yuan Yu 168, had a broken rudder. Tanjung Datu crew made a repair and the ship was escorted out of Indonesia's EEZ.

Following the dispute in the South China Sea, KN Tanjung Datu have expelled approximately 31 to a maximum of 64 fishing boats (in single occasion) escorted by 3 Chinese Coast Guard vessels in the North Natuna Sea.

== See also ==
- Haixun-class cutter
