= Dorang-class patrol boat =

Patrol boat class of the Indonesian Navy

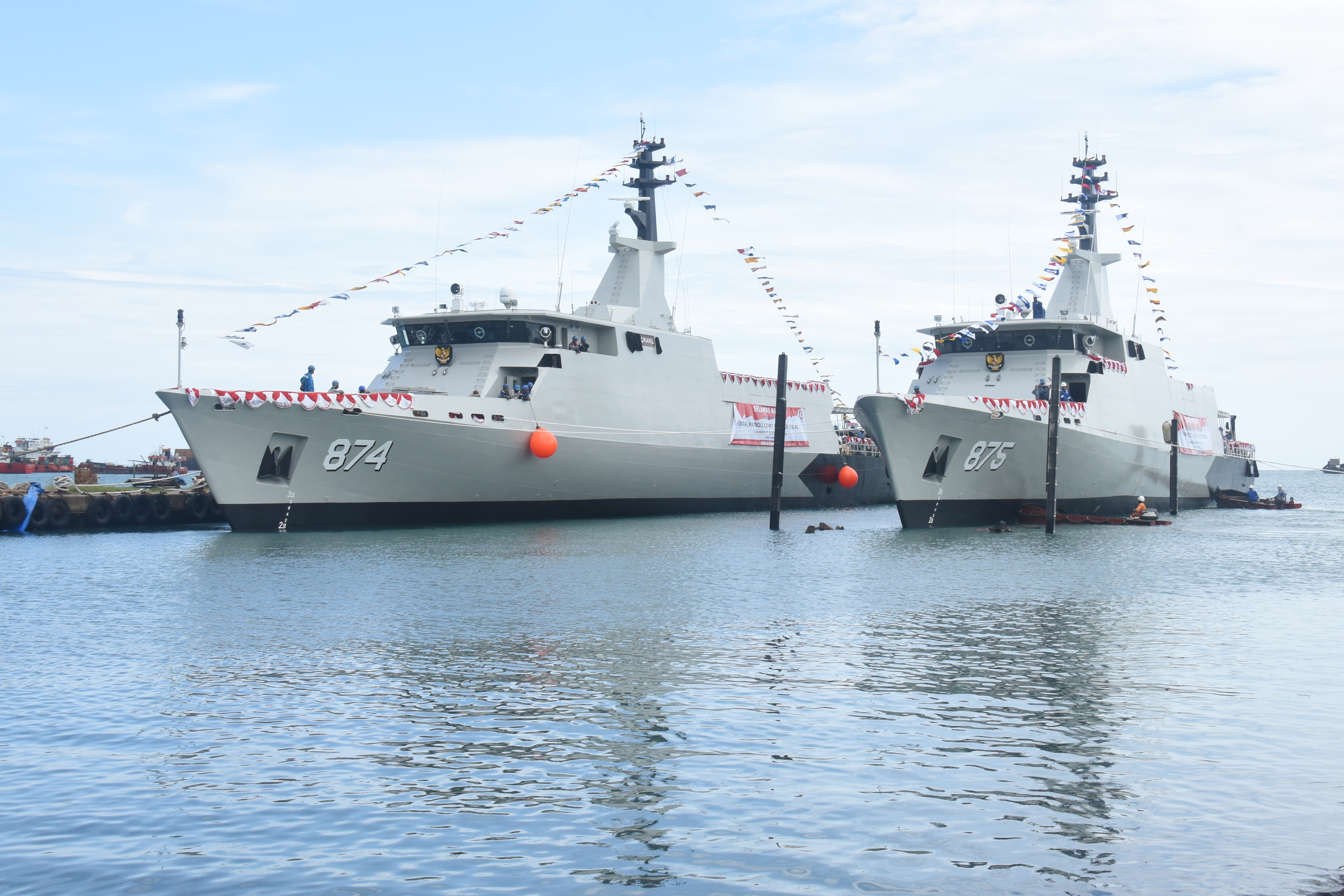
- Dorang (874) and Bawal (875) during the commissioning ceremony

Class overview
- Name: Dorang class
- Builders: PT Palindo Marine; PT Karimun Anugerah Sejati; PT Caputra Mitra Sejati
- Operators: Indonesian Navy
- Preceded by: Pari class
- Built: 2020–present
- In commission: 2022–present
- Planned: 6
- Completed: 6
- Active: 6

General characteristics
- Type: Patrol boat
- Tonnage: 520 t (510 long tons) (full load)
- Length: 60 m (196 ft 10 in)
- Beam: 8.5 m (27 ft 11 in)
- Height: 4.95 m (16 ft 3 in)
- Draught: 2.72 m (8 ft 11 in)
- Propulsion: 2 × MTU 20V400M73 diesel engines
- Speed: 24 knots (44 km/h; 28 mph)
- Endurance: 6 days
- Complement: 55
- Armament: 1 × Bofors 40 mm (1.6 in) main gun; 2 × 12.7 mm (0.50 in) machine guns

The Dorang class is a patrol boat class of the Indonesian Navy, also known as the Type PC-60 or PC-60M patrol boat. It was developed from KCR-60M and PC-40 designs and built locally across various Indonesian shipyards. It is an indirect successor of FPB-57 class in terms of size and tonnage.

As of December 2022, two vessels of the Dorang class are in active service with four other under construction. The Dorang-class patrol boats can be modified to be equipped with anti-ship missiles when needed.

== Background ==
During the appointment ceremony of Indonesian Navy's then Eastern Fleet Command chief of staff, Rear Admiral Darwanto on 23 January 2015, Indonesia's then Chief of Staff of the Navy, Admiral Ade Supandi stated that to prevent illegal fishing by foreign commercial vessels in eastern Indonesia, the Indonesian Navy needs at least 15–20 patrol boats operating every day. The performance of elements of military force also needs to be intensified so he concluded that the Indonesian Navy needed 40 new patrol boats with a size of 60 metres (200 ft). But for the initial stage, he projects to acquire at least 22 patrol boats first through a gradual procurement process, and also aims to replace older patrol boats.

On 31 August 2022, the first two PC-60 patrol boats were inaugurated by Admiral Yudo Margono with Dorang (874) being the lead ship for the class.

== Characteristics ==
=== Armaments ===
The Dorang-class patrol boat has standard armament in the form of a single-barreled 40-millimeter (1.6 in) OTO Melara main gun which has a tracking system capability because it is equipped with a laser range finder, infrared camera, Day Camera and is integrated with the fire control system. In addition, two 12.7 mm (0.50 in) heavy machine guns were also installed on the right and left sides of the hull as a defense weapon against air attacks. This ship can be fitted with anti-ship missiles at the stern if required in further modification.

=== Design ===
These patrol boats are 60 metres (196 ft 10 in) long, with a 2.72 m (8 ft 11 in) draft and are 8.5 m (27 ft 11 in) wide, powered by two MTU 20V400M73 diesel engines which produce 3,200 kilowatts (4,300 hp) of power and have a cruising speed of 15 knots (28 km/h; 17 mph) and a maximum speed of 24 knots (44 km/h; 28 mph). They have a full load displacement of 520 metric tons (510 long tons), with a maximum sailing endurance of six days and are crewed by 46 active plus 9 reserve personnel.

== Ship in class ==
Name	Hull no.	Builder	Laid down	Launched	Commissioned	Home port	Status
Dorang	874	Caputra Mitra Sejati	February 2020	25 March 2022	31 August 2022	Ambon	Active
Bawal	875	Caputra Mitra Sejati	February 2020	25 March 2022	31 August 2022	Sorong	Active
Tuna	876	Karimun Anugrah Sejati	4 March 2022	5 July 2023	7 September 2023	Belawan	Active
Marlin	877	Palindo Marine	15 March 2022	7 September 2023	20 December 2023	Makassar	Active
Hampala	880	Caputra Mitra Sejati	9 December 2022	12 July 2024	17 December 2024	Merauke	Active
Lumba-Lumba	881	Caputra Mitra Sejati	9 December 2022	12 July 2024	17 December 2024	Tarakan	Active
