= Indonesian Sea and Coast Guard Unit =

Indonesian government agency

Indonesian Sea and Coast Guard Unit Kesatuan Penjagaan Laut dan Pantai Republik Indonesia
- Racing stripe

- Logo
- Abbreviation: KPLP
- Motto: Dharma Jala Praja Tama (Sanskrit) "As a maritime organization that always strives to serve the best devotion to the nation and state"

Agency overview
- Formed: 30 January 1973; 53 years ago
- Preceding agencies: Komando Operasi Penjaga Laut dan Pantai (1970); Operasi Polisionil di Laut (1962)
- Employees: c. 9000 employees

Jurisdictional structure
- National agency (Operations jurisdiction): Indonesia
- Operations jurisdiction: Indonesia
- Legal jurisdiction: Indonesian Maritime Zone
- Governing body: Government of Indonesia
- Constituting instrument: SK Menhub No.KM.14/U/plib-73 tanggal 30 Januari 1973
- Specialist jurisdiction: Coastal patrol, marine border protection, marine search and rescue

Operational structure
- Headquarters: Jalan Medan Merdeka Barat No.8, Central Jakarta, Jakarta
- Elected officer responsible: Budi Karya Sumadi, Minister of Transportation
- Agency executive: Jon Kenedi, M.Mar.Eng,.M.M., Director of KPLP
- Parent agency: Ministry of Transportation

Website
- simkplp.dephub.go.id

The Indonesian Sea and Coast Guard Unit (Indonesian: Kesatuan Penjagaan Laut dan Pantai Republik Indonesia, KPLP) is an agency of Government of Indonesia which main function is to ensure the safety of shipping inside the Indonesian Maritime Zone.

== History ==
=== Dutch colonial era ===
During the Dutch colonial era, two agency of the colonial government called the Governments's Navy (Gouvernementsmarine) and the Shipping Agency (Dienst van Scheepvaart) was formed to protect the sea and coast of the Dutch East Indies.

The two organisation was briefly dissolved in 1942 during the Japanese occupation of the Dutch East Indies in World War II.

After the Surrender of Japan, the two organization was recreated to continue their main function. In 1947, at the midst of the Indonesian National Revolution, the two agency was merged becoming the Sea and Coast Guard Service (Zee en Kustbewaking Dienst).

In parallel to the Dutch agency, the Indonesian government who was then waging war against the Dutch formed their own organisation which has the same role as the Dutch Sea and Coast Guard called the Shipping Service of the Republic of Indonesia (Jawatan Pelayaran Republik Indonesia).

=== Post-independence ===
After the Dutch recognition of Indonesia, the Dutch handed the Sea and Coast Guard to the new Government of Indonesia.

The Indonesian government then merged the Sea and Coast Guard and the Shipping Service of the Republic of Indonesia into the Marine and Coast Guard Service (Indonesian: Kesatuan Penjagaan Laut dan Pantai Indonesia).

The agency was immediately placed under the jurisdiction of the Ministry of Transportation. During the turbulence period in the 1950s as well as the rising of secessionist groups around the country, the government decided to transfer the MCGS into the Indonesian Navy on 31 January 1950 as a paramilitary branch.

In 1952, the agency was again separated from the Indonesian Navy and was again placed under the jurisdiction of the Ministry of Transportation. The agency however still worked together with the Navy and Police to put down secessionist groups around the country until the early 1960s.

In 1962, the agency was renamed to Operasi Polisionil di Laut (OPDIL) and was placed under the Directorate of Sea Operations of the Ministry of Transportation.

In 1965, The OPDIL was renamed again to Assistant Special Operations of Government Transport (AOKAP) based on SK.Menhubla Number Kab.4 / 9/16/1965.

Based on SK. Minister of Transport No.M.14 / 3/14 Phb dated 20 June 1966, the agency changed its name to the Bureau of Shipping Safety (BKP) with the task of organizing the Special Police in the Sea and SAR. Based on SK. Maritime Minister: No. Kab.4 / 3/14 dated 13 December 1966 BKP was incorporated into the Operations Unit Command (KASOTOP) which later became the Directorate of Shipping while maintaining Police duties at sea.

With the change of the Maritime Department into the Department of Transportation, based on SK. Minister of Transportation M.b./14/7 Phb dated 24 August 1968, the Special Duties of the SAR was incorporated into the Directorate of Navigation, and by the Minister of Transportation was renamed back to the Marine and Coast Guard with the task of organizing the Maritime Security and Port Special Security units within national territories.

Based on SK Dirjen Hubla No.Kab.4 / 3/4 dated 11 April 1970 DPLP became the Sea and Coastal Operation Command (KOPLP). Based on Decree of the Minister of Transportation No. km.14 / U / plib-73 dated 30 January 1973 KOPLP became Sea and Coast Guard (KPLP)., which is the agency's present name.

== Duties ==
=== Roles ===
KPLP has the task of formulating and execute policies, standards, norms, guidelines, criteria and procedures, as well as technical guidance, evaluation and reporting on patrol and security, safety monitoring and Civil Service Investigator (PPNS), order of shipping, water, facilities and infrastructure of coastal and marine guarding.

=== Function ===
- Develop policy in the field of sea and coast guard, including but not limited to patrol and security, safety supervision and civil service investigator, order of voyage, handling of disaster and underwater work, facilities and infrastructure of coastal and sea guard;
- Formulate standards, norms, guidelines, criteria and procedures in the field of sea and coast guard;
- Provide technical guidance in the field of sea and coast guard;
- Execute activity in the field of sea and coast guard.
- Provide technical guidance Directorate General of Sea Transportation and the preparation and provide technical qualifications of human resources in the field of sea and coast guard.
- Evaluate and report activity in the field of sea and coast guard.
- Administrative affairs, personnel and household within Directorate.

== Organisation structure ==
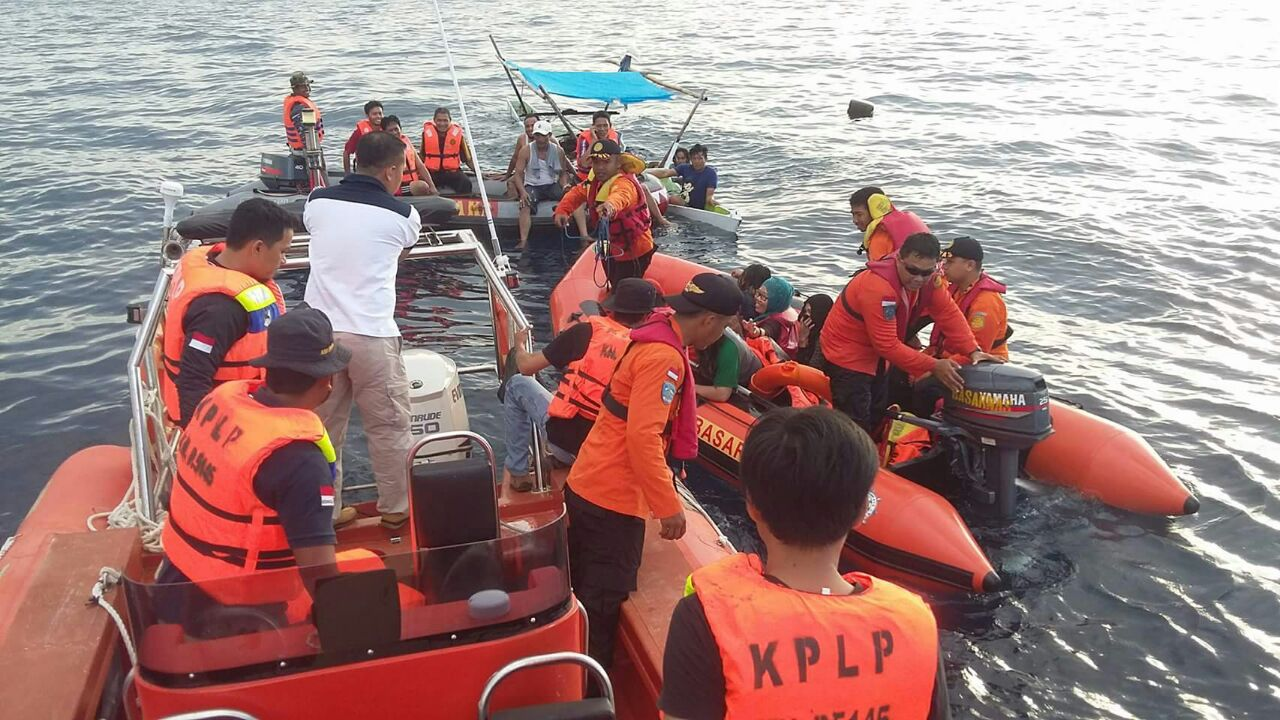
Personnel of the Indonesian Sea and Coast Guard during a search-and-rescue mission

The KPLP Directorate is an Echelon II Unit under the Directorate General of Sea Transportation, Indonesian Ministry of Transportation. Therefore, they report directly to the Minister of Transportation of the Republic of Indonesia.

KPLP is also coordinate with other unit within Directorate General of Sea Transportation such as Technical Execution Unit (Unit Pelaksana Teknis/ UPT) Marine and Coastal Protection Base (Pangkalan Penjagaan Laut dan Pantai/ PPLP) spread in Indonesia.

The KPLP is governed directly through the Law Number 17 Year 2008 on the Sailing of Chapter XVII Articles 276- 281.

- Directorate of Sea and Coast Guard
  - Sub-Directorate of Patrol and Security
    - Section of Patrol
    - Section of Security
  - Sub-Directorate of Safety and Civil Service Investigator
    - Section of Safety Monitoring
    - Section of Civil Service Investigator
  - Sub-Directorate of Order of Shipping
    - Section of Seaport Affairs
    - Section of Naval Accidents
  - Sub-Directorate Disaster Management and Underwater Service
    - Section of Disaster Management
    - Section of Underwater Service
  - Sub-Directorate of Facilities and Infrastructure
    - Section of Facilities and Infrastructure
    - Section of Ship Crewman
  - Sub-Division of Administration

== Operation ==
- Enforcement of legislation in the field of shipping,
- Investigation of the criminal act of shipping,
- Supervision and control of salvage activities and underwater work,
- Installation / exploration and exploitation of buildings above and below water,
- Providing search and rescue assistance in the sea and fire prevention,
- Security and supervision of navigation aids,
- Prevention of pollution in sea and beach waters as well
- Training of shipbuilding and installation

=== Cooperation with other agencies ===
KPLP is not associated with the Indonesian Maritime Security Agency (Indonesian: Badan Keamanan Laut Indonesia - Bakamla).

While the former is under the jurisdiction of the Ministry of Transportation, the latter is under the jurisdiction of the Coordinating Ministry for Political, Legal, and Security Affairs.

Both agencies however have similar roles and functions and often conduct joint operations and joint maneuvers and simulation exercises together.

The KPLP is also not associated or part of the Indonesian National Armed Forces. They, however often conduct joint-exercise and joint-operations with the Indonesian Navy.

== Facilities and equipment ==
=== Infrastructure ===
Installations at Sea and Coast Guard Base consist of:

1. Patrol Boat
2. Dock;
3. Sea and Coast Guard Command and Communications Room
4. Workshop;
5. Dormitory and Operational House;
6. Water Bunkers;
7. Armory and Ammunition;
8. Warehouse Supplies;
9. Temporary Detention Room / Cells;
10. Generator Set;
11. Helipad;
12. Slip Way.

==== Fleet ====
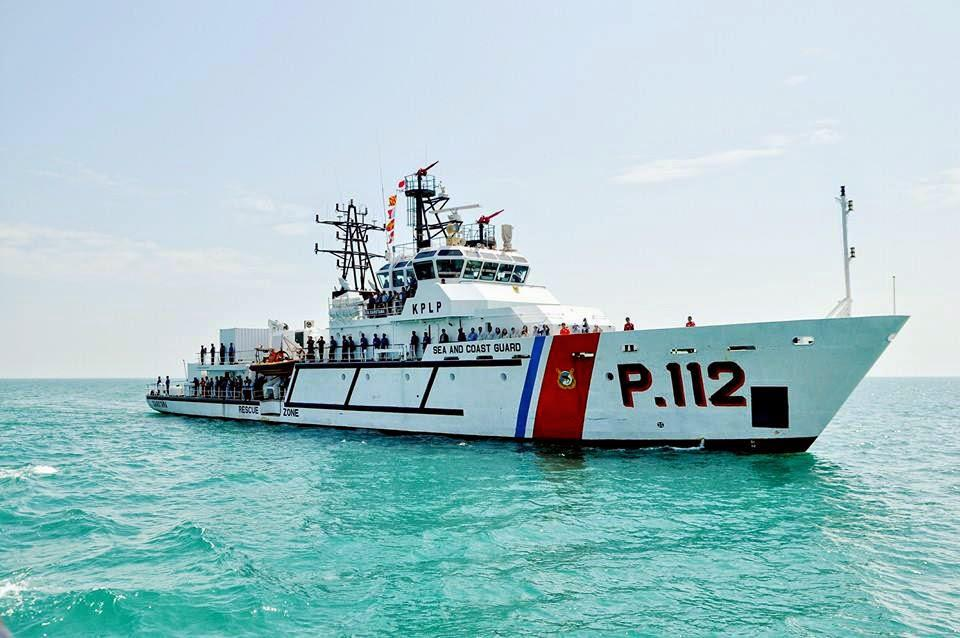
KN Sarotama (P.112), the Class 1 patrol ship

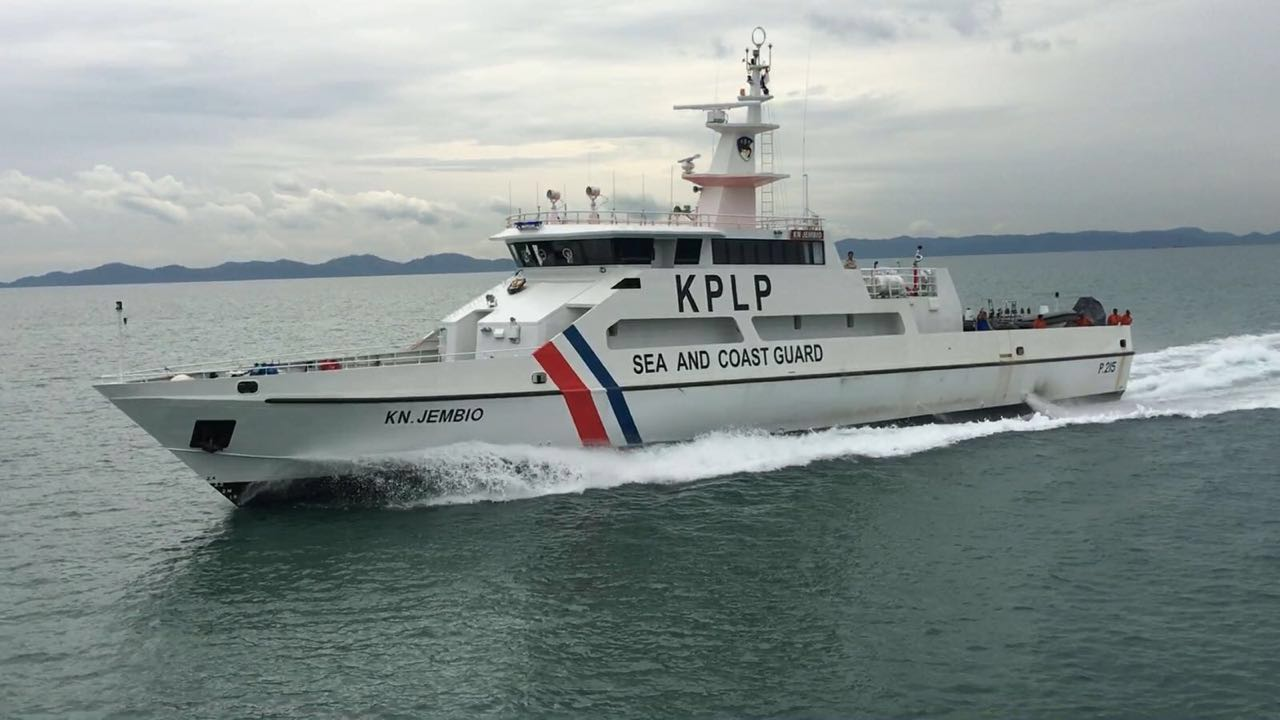
KN Jembio (P.215) of the Indonesian Sea and Coast Guard during a patrol mission

According to Director of KPLP, as of May 2018, KPLP has:

1. 7 units of class 1 patrol boats.
2. 15 units of class 2 patrol boats
3. 59 units of class 3 patrol boats
4. 69 units of class 4 patrol boats
5. 245 units of class 5 patrol boats

Class	Type	Ships	Origin	Note
Class 1 (60 m)	Patrol Ship	KN Trisula (P.111); KN Sarotama (P.112); KN Alugara (P.114); KN Kalimasadha (P.115); KN Chundamani (P.116); KN Kalawai (P.117); KN Gandiwa (P.118)	Indonesia	In active service.
Class 2 (40 m)	Patrol Ship	KN Kujang (P.201); KN Parang (P.202); KN Celurit (P.203); KN Cundrik (P.204); KN Belati (P.205); KN Golok (P.206); KN Panah (P.207); KN Pedang (P.208); KN Kapak (P.209); KN Rantos (P.210); KN Grantin (P.211); KN Pasatimpo (P.212); KN Salawaku (P.213); KN Damaru (P.214); KN Jembio (P.215)	Indonesia	In active service.

In order to support the scope of work with the development of new bases across Indonesia, KPLP will be strengthened with a range of patrol boats that match, both types of first class vessels and third class.

In addition, the ships will be equipped with weaponry for the security of both personnel and even the fleet of bad possibilities while operating in the oceans.

Shipbuilding plans until 2019 will build 100 units of first and third class vessels to be deployed throughout Indonesia for the reinforcement of existing vessels and refurbishment of ships.

Minister of Transportation Ignasius Jonan is targeting for the next five years the Marine and Coastal Guard Organization (KPLP) has 500 patrol boats of various sizes. The government will also add about 100 units of first class patrol boats (about 60 meters in size) and 150-200 units for grade two to five (size 42 meters to smaller).

A total of 400 units of ship KPLP class patrol IV and V will also be replaced from the previous fiber made into rigid inflatable boat. In addition it will expand the patrol area and also add more personnel.

=== Identification ===
The KPLP uniform is dark blue, darker than the Indonesian Navy uniform.

If members are former Indonesian Navy personnel, they may retain their previous navy rank and specialty rating.

All personnel use black beret with KPLP logo. Civil personnel wear the rank and insignia of their civil service grade.

== Future ==
=== Separation from the Ministry of Transportation ===
Based on Law No. 17/ 2008 on Shipping, mandated establishment of Sea and Coast Guard, a government agency that carries out the function of sea and coast guard and execute law and regulation related to sea and coast guard, the agency would be under the President's responsibility and will run operationally by the Minister.

Government regulation regarding sea and coast guard which will define details and technical application should be issued. However, due to the debate and pros and cons, since 2008 until 2018, the government regulation has not been finalized and issued yet.

This debate concerns the dilemma between the statute and harmonious or overlapping maritime patrols, oversight and law enforcement, which is also carried out by the Maritime Security Coordinating Board (which by the end of 2014 has become the Maritime Security Agency), Directorate General of Marine and Fisheries Resources Surveillance under Ministry of Maritime Affairs and Fisheries and several other institutions.

Minister of Transportation Ignatius Jonan supported the creation of Maritime Security Agency, but rejected of a KPLP under Maritime Security Agency because of KPLP mandated by Law No. 17/ 2008 and KPLP is the agency recognized by IMO (International Maritime Organization). Minister Jonan also had proposed KPLP raised from Echelon II to Echelon I (Directorate General), although this reaped controversy from experts.

In 2024, the third revision of this law further solidified KPLP's role as the sole coast guard authority, which created legal conflicts with the Maritime Security Agency, previously using the title "Indonesia Coast Guard" without legal recognition.

This development has led to concerns about legal clarity and the effectiveness of Indonesia’s maritime law enforcement both domestically and in international collaborations.
