= Darwanto =

Indonesian admiral

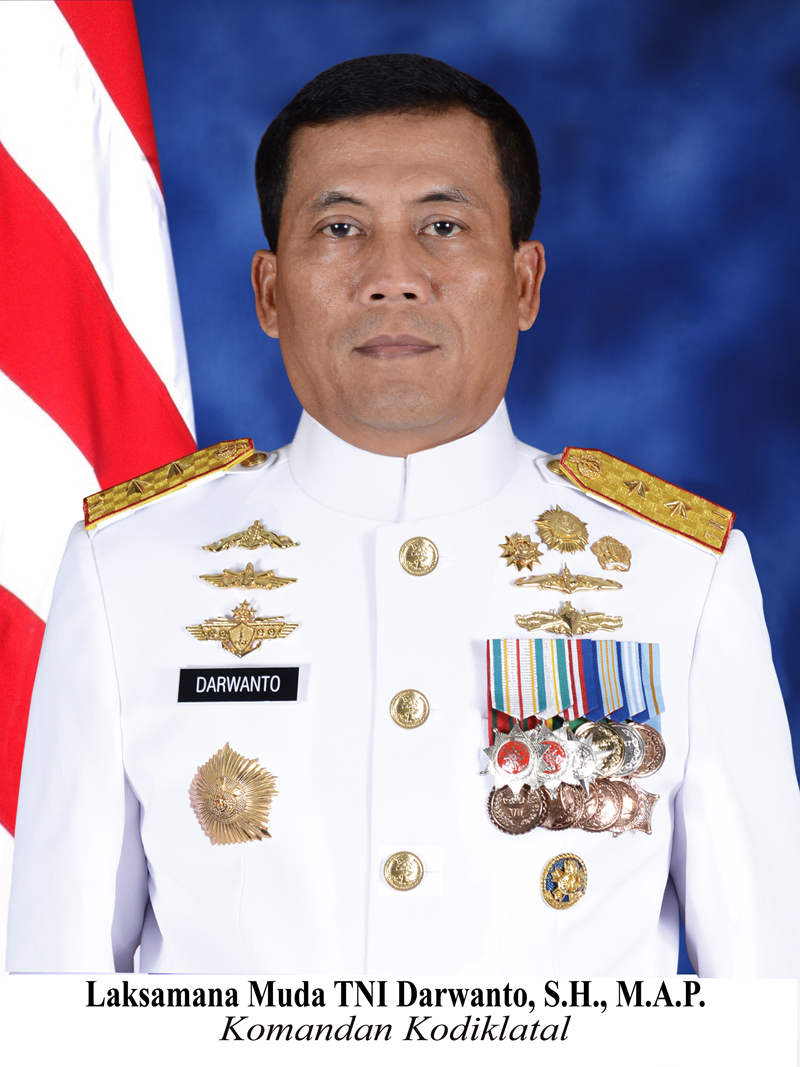
- Born: 13 September 1961 (age 65); Rangkasbitung, Banten, Indonesia
- Military career
- Allegiance: Indonesia
- Branch: Indonesian Navy
- Service years: 1984-2019
- Rank: Rear Admiral
- Commands: Chief of Staff of Indonesian Navy
- Awards: See Awards

Darwanto (born 13 September 1961) is a former rear admiral in the Indonesian Navy who served as its Chief of Staff (Indonesian: Kepala Pelaksanan Harian) to the Kodiklatal in the navy.

== Career ==
He graduated from the Naval Academy on 13 September 1961. He has served various assignments both on warships and on staff.

His education and training later included Suspaja (1984), Tar P-4 (1985), Dikcawak Kasel (1986), Sus Check (1986), Dikspespa/Art TA. 1988/1989, Diklapa II/Koum TA.1991/1992, Sus Pakom (1993), Sus Protis (1994), Sus Danlanal (1995), TNI Naval Command and Staff School (Seskoal) Force 35 (1997-1998), TNI Staff and Command School (Sesko) (2007) and Lemhannas RI PPSA (2013).

On 13 November 2017, the position of the Commander of the Eastern Fleet (Pangarmatim) has changed. Rear Admiral (Laksda) Darwanto, who was serving as Pangarmatim, have been replaced by Admiral Didik Setiyono. Ahead of the change of command, Armatim held an exit briefing at the Panti Tjahaja Timur Koarmatim Ujung Surabaya building. In this activity, Admiral Darwanto expressed his gratitude to all officers in the ranks of Armatim who sincerely and worked hard to help him as Pangarmatim by carrying out their duties.

== Awards ==
Bintang Yudha Dharma Nararya

Bintang Jalasena Pratama

Bintang Jalasena Nararya

Satyalancana Kesetiaan 24 years' service

Satyalancana Kesetiaan 16 years' service

Satyalancana Kesetiaan 8 years' service

Satyalancana Dwidya Sistha

Satyalancana Kebhaktian Sosial

Satyalancana Dharma Nusa

Satyalancana Wira Karya

Satyalancana Wira Dharma

Satyalancana Santi Dharma

Satyalancana Gerakan Operasi Militer VII (Darul Islam rebellion Aceh chapter)

== Position ==
- Assistant Officer of the Weapons Division (Aspadivsen) KRI Ratulangi (1985)
- Pa TPO KRI Pasopati
- Padivsen KRI Cakra (1990)
- Head of Satsel Opslat (1995)
- Commander of KRI Arung Samudera (1996-1997)
- Commander of KRI Teluk Peleng (1998)
- Commander of KRI Dewaruci (1998–2001)
- Commander of KRI Cakra (2001–2002)
- Commander of the Koarmatim Submarine Unit (2002–2006)
- Paban II Jemen Srena Kasal (2006–2007)
- Commander Lanal Ternate (2007–2008)
- Asops Pangarmabar (2008–2009)
- Wadan Lantamal IV Tanjung Pinang (2009–2010)
- Paban II Ops Sopsal Headquarters (2010–2011)
- Commander of Lantamal IV Tanjung Pinang (2011–2012)
- Chief of Staff of Koarmatim (2012–2013)
- Waasops Commander of the TNI (2013–2014)
- Pankolinlamil (2014–2015)
- Pangarmatim (2015–2017)
- Dankodiklatal (2017–2018)
- Chief Expert Staff (2018–2019)

== See also ==
- Indonesian military ranks
