= Pari-class patrol boat =

Class of Indonesian naval vessels

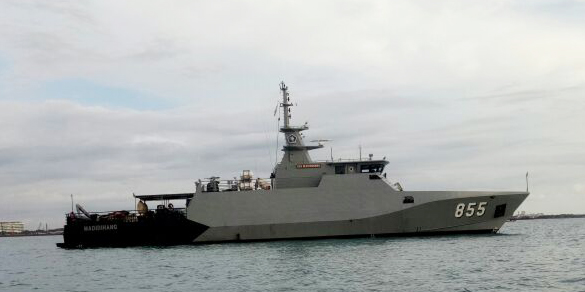
- KRI Madidihang (855)

Class overview
- Name: Pari class
- Builders: PT Palindo Marine; PT Karimun Anugrah Sejati; PT Caputra Mitra Sejati; PT Citra Shipyard
- Operators: Indonesian Navy
- Succeeded by: Dorang class
- In commission: 2013–present
- Planned: 42
- Completed: 19
- Active: 19

General characteristics
- Type: Patrol boat
- Tonnage: 250 tons
- Length: Batch I 43.25 m (141 ft 11 in); Batch II 45.50 m (149 ft 3 in)
- Beam: Batch I 7.4 m (24 ft 3 in); Batch II 7.9 m (25 ft 11 in)
- Height: Batch I 3.4 m (11 ft 2 in); Batch II 4.25 m (13 ft 11 in)
- Draught: 1.7 m (5 ft 7 in)
- Speed: Batch I 27 knots (50 km/h; 31 mph); Batch II 24 knots (44 km/h; 28 mph)
- Range: 1,632 nautical miles (3,022 km; 1,878 mi)
- Endurance: 5 days
- Complement: Batch I = 29; Batch II = 35
- Armament: 1 × Oto Melara Marlin WS 30mm; 2 × Pindad SM5 12.7 mm (0.50 in) machine guns

Pari class is a patrol boat class of the Indonesian Navy, also known as Type PC-40 or PC-40M patrol boat. In total, the Indonesian Navy operates 19 vessels of the Pari class, built by various local private shipyards.

== Armaments ==
The vessel is equipped with PT Pindad-made 30 mm and 12.7 mm calibre machine guns. It also has a combat information room, a communication room and an ammunition store room.

== Ship in class ==
Name	Hull no.	Builder	Laid down	Launched	Commissioned	Home port	Status
Batch I
Pari	849	Palindo Marine		29 April 2013	5 September 2013	Tarakan	Active
Sembilang	850	Palindo Marine		29 April 2013	5 September 2013	Pontianak	Active
Sidat	851	Citra Shipyard			27 September 2014	Tarakan	Active
Cakalang	852	Caputra Mitra Sejati		11 Maret 2016	20 July 2016	Padang	Active
Batch II
Tatihu	853	Palindo Marine	2015	2016	10 January 2017	Jayapura	Active
Layaran	854	Palindo Marine	2015	2016	10 January 2017	Aru	Active
Madidihang	855	Palindo Marine	2015	2016	10 January 2017	Merauke	Active
Kurau	856	Caputra Mitra Sejati		7 March 2017	6 July 2017	Padang	Active
Torani	860	Karimun Anugrah Sejati			30 March 2017		Active
Lepu	861	Karimun Anugrah Sejati			30 March 2017		Active
Albakora	867	Caputra Mitra Sejati			9 July 2018	Jayapura	Active
Bubara	868	Caputra Mitra Sejati		26 August 2019	18 December 2019	Tanjungpinang	Active
Gulamah	869	Caputra Mitra Sejati		26 August 2019	18 December 2019	Surabaya	Active
Posepa	870	Caputra Mitra Sejati		27 July 2020	7 December 2020	Surabaya	Active
Escolar	871	Caputra Mitra Sejati		27 July 2020	7 December 2020	Kupang	Active
Karotang	872	Karimun Anugrah Sejati		24 August 2020	7 December 2020	Jayapura	Active
Mata Bongsang	873	Karimun Anugrah Sejati		24 August 2020	7 December 2020	Belawan	Active
Butana	878	Citra Shipyard	29 November 2022	7 May 2024	6 September 2024	Surabaya	Active
Selar	879	Citra Shipyard	29 November 2022	7 May 2024	6 September 2024	Manado	Active

== Notable deployments ==
In January 2021, KRI Kurau (856) was involved in the process of evacuating the Sriwijaya Air Flight 182 crash with 11 other Indonesian Navy ships.
