= KRI Arung Samudera =

Indonesian tall ship

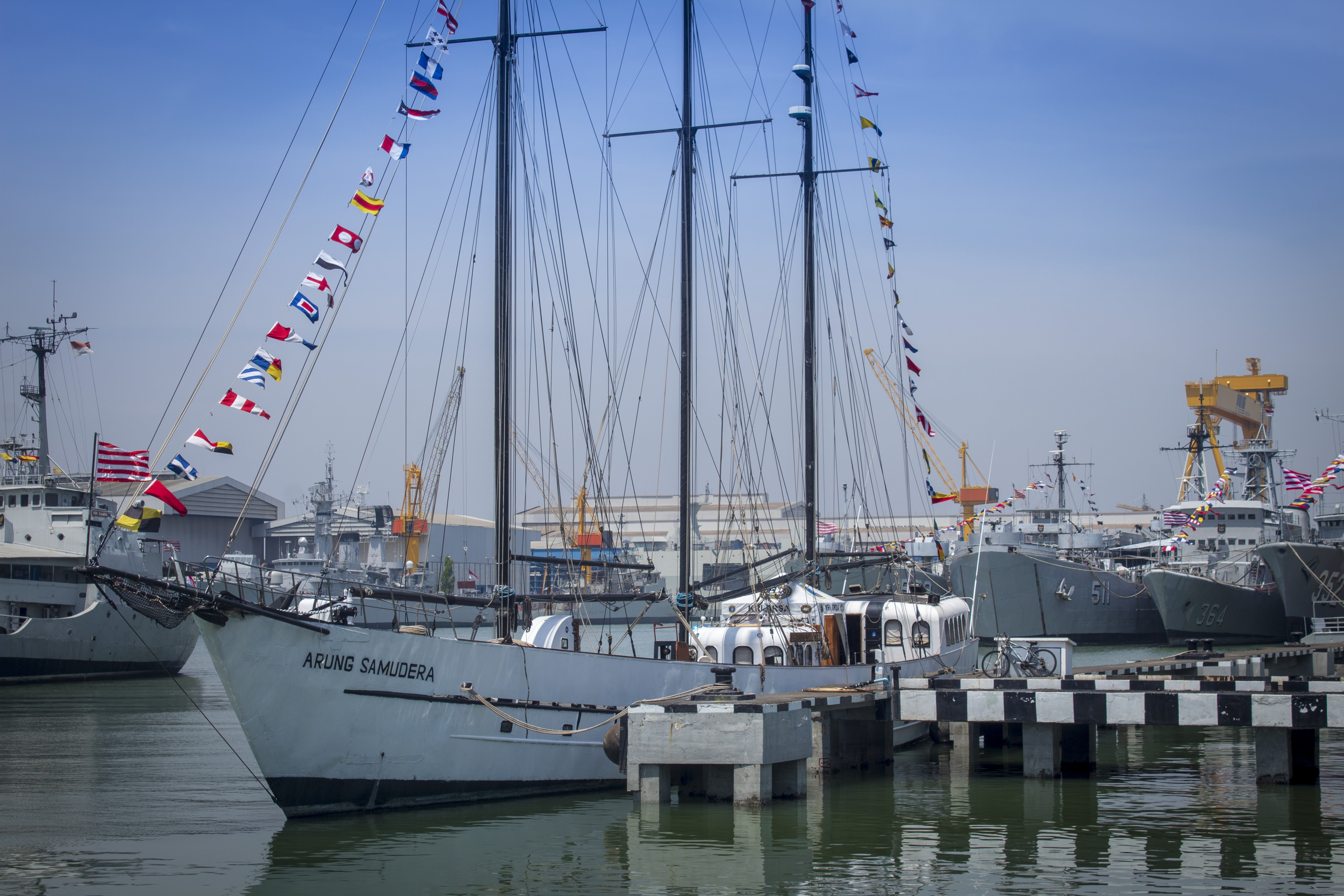
- Indonesian Navy cadet training schooner KRI Arung Samudera in 2018

History

Indonesia
- Name: KRI Arung Samudera
- Commissioned: 1995

General characteristics
- Type: Schooner
- Length: 39 m (129 ft)

KRI Arung Samudera, which means "Ocean Crossings", is an Indonesian tall ship. The sailing vessel is a class B schooner which measures 129 feet (39 m) in length. Notable features include arched windows on the aft deckhouse, three single-piece masts, and a boxy hull.

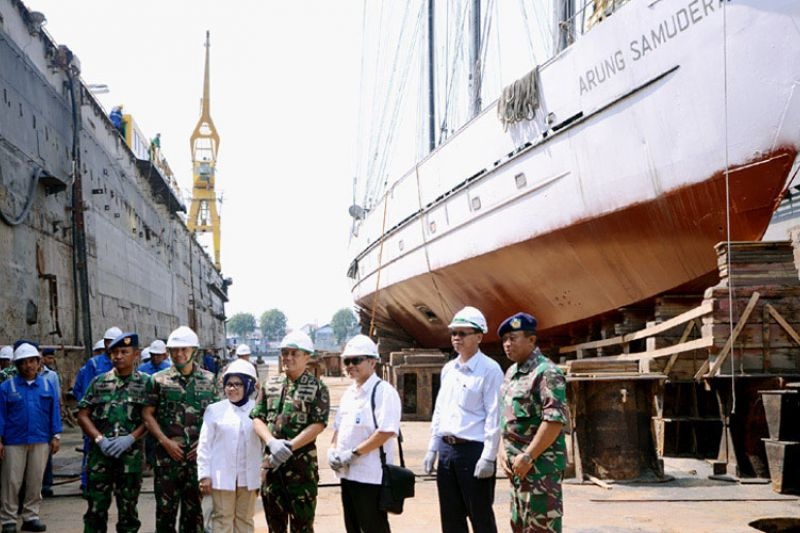
Indonesian Navy cadet training schooner KRI Arung Samudera undergoing refit in 2015

Originally built to be used as a New Zealand sail training vessel in 1991, the ship was commissioned to be used as the first training vessel of the Indonesian Navy at the Arung Samudera Conference of island nations in 1995.

== 2007 grounding ==
On 23 August 2007, KRI Arung Samudera ran aground off the Sunshine Coast of Queensland, Australia in stormy weather. Efforts were made to salvage her, and the vessel was described as having an intact hull, being in no immediate danger of breaking up.
