= Alpha Unmanned Systems =

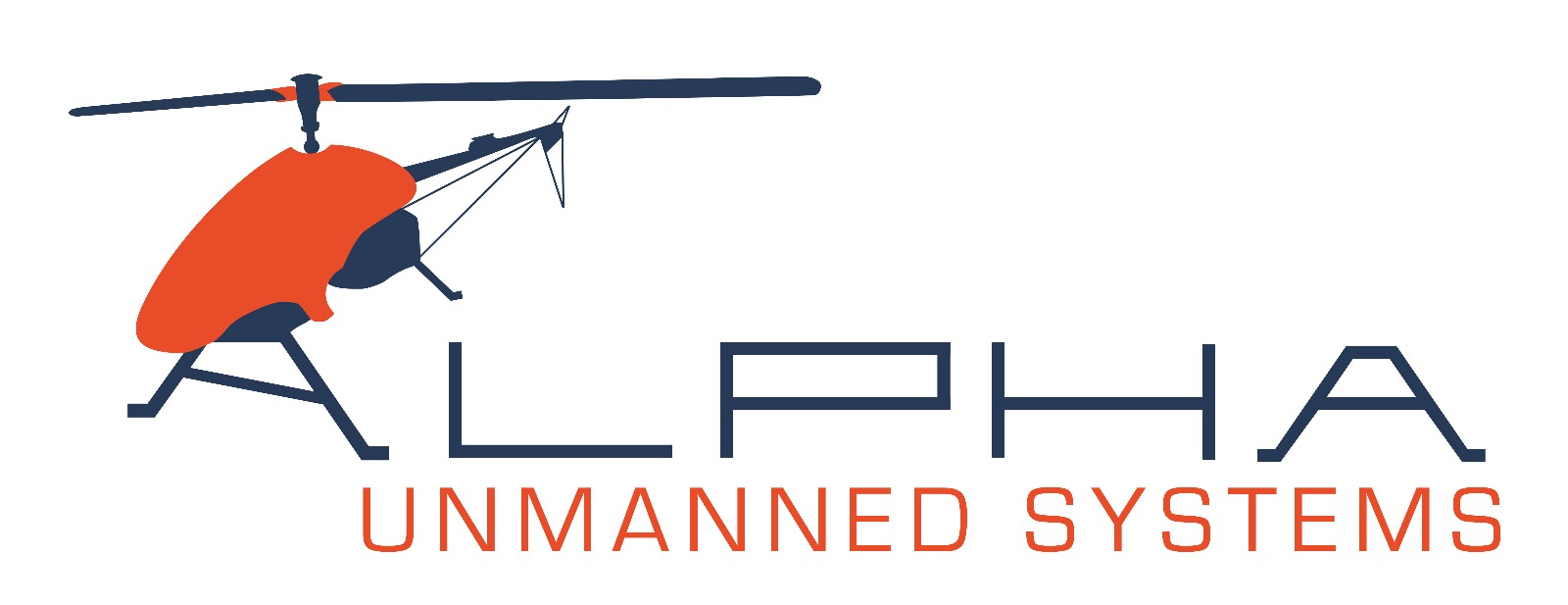
- Industry: Aerospace
- Founded: 2014
- Headquarters: Madrid, Spain
- Website: www.alphaunmannedsystems.com

Alpha Unmanned Systems is a privately owned Spanish company based in Madrid, dedicated to the design, development and production of small unmanned aerial vehicles (sUAVs). Additionally, the company provides integration of flight control systems and payloads for ISTAR missions and non-military tasks.

== History ==
Alpha Unmanned Systems, SL is a privately held independent company based in Madrid, Spain. Founded in 2014 by Juan Luque, Alvaro Escarpenter and Eric Freeman, the Alpha team includes aeronautical engineers, electronic engineers, mechanical engineers, UAV pilots and business professionals.

Alpha is led by Eric Freeman and Alvaro Escarpenter. The company offers solutions such as a ground control station, communications, and control software.

== Applications ==
The Alpha 800 Helicopter is capable of performing the following missions:

=== Military Missions ===
- Intelligence gathering
- Communication relay
- Public safety missions
- Target acquisition
- “Over the hill” surveillance

=== Civil ===
- Fire assessment
- Border patrol
- Surveillance and inspection
- Electric Transmission line inspection
