= Palindo Marine =

Shipyard in Batam, Indonesia

Coordinates: 1.0138466°N 103.9385883°E

PT Palindo Marine
- Industry: Shipbuilding
- Founded: 2007; 19 years ago
- Headquarters: Batam, Riau Islands, Indonesia
- Area served: Worldwide
- Products: Patrol boats Naval ships Ferries
- Website: http://palindomarine.co.id/index.html

PT Palindo Marine or PT Palindo Marine Shipyard (PMS) is a shipbuilding company located on the Sei Lekop island of Tanjung Uncang Batam, Indonesia, near Singapore. It has operated since 2007.

Products from PT Palindo Marine include patrol boats, passenger ferries, rescue boats, barges and various vessels made of steel, aluminium, glass-fiber reinforced plastic (GFRP) and a combination of steel and aluminium.

== Background ==
The company employs more than 500 individuals, and is capable of producing high-quality ships. Its main customers are from Indonesia, Malaysia, Singapore and Thailand. It works with Indonesian government agencies such as the Navy, Department of Fisheries, Department of Forestry, The National Search And Rescue Agency, and others.

== Naval ships ==
Naval ships built by PT Palindo Marine include:

- Clurit-class fast attack craft
- Dorang-class patrol boat
- Pari-class patrol boat
- Bawean-class patrol boat
- Kudungga-class patrol boat
- Bireuen-class patrol boat
