= Ibnu Hadjar =

Indonesian Islamic militant (1920–1965)

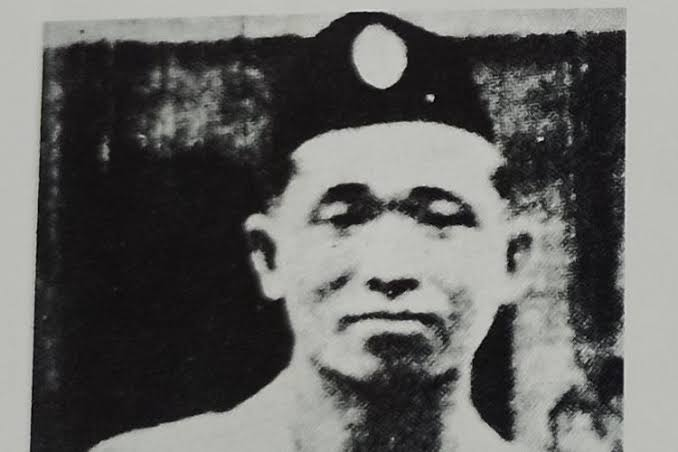
- Born: Haderi; 19 April 1920; Ambutun, Dutch East Indies
- Died: 22 March 1965 (aged 44)
- Military career
- Allegiance: Indonesia (?–1950); Islamic State of Indonesia (1954–1963)
- Branch: Indonesian Navy; Islamic Armed Forces of Indonesia
- Service years: ?–1950, 1954–1963
- Rank: Second Lieutenant
- Conflicts: Indonesian National Revolution; Darul Islam rebellion (executed)

Ibnu Hadjar (born Haderi; 19 April 1920 – 22 March 1965) was an Indonesian Navy officer and later the leader of Darul Islam in South Kalimantan from 1950 to 1963. He participated in Kalimantan Physical Revolution under the 4th Division of the Indonesian Navy. After the revolution, following the army reorganization, he was rejected from joining the military due to his illiteracy. He subsequently started an insurgency against the government and later joined the Islamic State of Indonesia. After surrendering he was arrested, and sentenced to death.

== Early life ==
Ibnu Hadjar was born on 19 April 1920 in Ambutun with the original name Haderi. Before the Japanese occupation, he worked as a farmer and honey collector.

During the Indonesian National Revolution, he joined 4th Division of Indonesian Navy with the rank of second lieutenant and changed his name to Ibnu Hadjar. He served as a guerilla commandant in Kandangan, South Kalimantan. In early 1950, Ibnu Hadjar joined United Indonesian State Army and was deployed to Pontianak for a short time.

== Leading the rebellion ==
In the aftermath of the revolution, the government conducted reorganization of the army which resulted in many militias excluded from the army. There was a tension especially between those of former Royal Netherlands East Indies Army whom are more favoured in the army recruitment and those who are not. Hadjar was illiterate and as the result he was not accepted to the army and later founded Kesatuan Rakjat jang Tertindas (KRjT, Union of the Oppressed People) to start insurgencies supported by his fellow militias that were also not accepted to the army.

In October 1950, the government informed that they would accept the insurgents who wanted to surrender. Hadjar visited Kandangan and told them that he had surrendered. The government asked Hadjar to persuade his colleagues to surrender. However, he did not do it and instead led an insurrection against the government. In early 1951, the chairman of Hulu Sungai Regional People's Representative, Zafry Zamzam, persuaded Ibnu Hadjar to surrender. During the early four years (1950–1954), Ibnu Hadjar and his forces attacked Kandangan four times, and the government managed to repulse them. Likewise, he also planned two attacks in Banjarmasin, which were in August 1953 and 1954 new year and the government thwarted the plans. At the end of 1954, Ibnu Hadjar announced that KjRT joined Darul Islam after Kartosoewirjo offered him a ministerial position in Islamic State of Indonesia. Kartosoewirjo appointed Ibnu Hadjar as the Darul Islam Territorial Commandant of Kalimantan. After KjRT joined Darul Islam, Ibnu Hadjar made several changes. He proclaimed himself as Ulul-Amri and named his forces into Angkatan Perang Tentara Islam (Islamic Army War Forces/APTI). Likewise, he renamed his headquarter to Istana Islam Merdeka (Free Islamic Palace).

== Later years ==
In 1963, DI/TII South Kalimantan's strength weakened because of intensive military operations. Looking at this situation, the police chief of South Kalimantan, Tengku Abdul Aziz, persuaded Hadjar and the rest of his forces to surrender with the promise of amnesty from the Jakarta government. Realizing that his forces were at the corner, he accepted the government's demand for surrender in July 1963. Subsequently, he and his small forces went to Ambutun and laid over the weapons to the government. On the next day, Hadjar attended the mass meeting in support of Indonesia–Malaysia confrontation in Banjarmasin and he said to the press that not only did he support it, but he was also willing to participate in the confrontation with his 14.000 soldiers.

In September 1963, the police arrested Ibnu Hadjar. Afterwards, he was brought to Banjarmasin and later to Jakarta. In Jakarta, he was put on trial by the military court, and received a death sentence on 11 March 1965. He was executed on 22 March.

== Personal life ==
Hadjar had two wives. He was illiterate.

== Bibliography ==
- Iqbal, Muhammad (2018-09-27). "Pemberontakan Kesatuan Rakjat Jang Tertindas (Krjt) Di Kalimantan Selatan (1950-1963): Sebuah Kajian Awal". Khazanah: Jurnal Studi Islam dan Humaniora (in Indonesian). 16 (1). doi:10.18592/khazanah.v16i1.2153. ISSN 2460-7606.
