= Hasan Basry =

Indonesian revolutionary

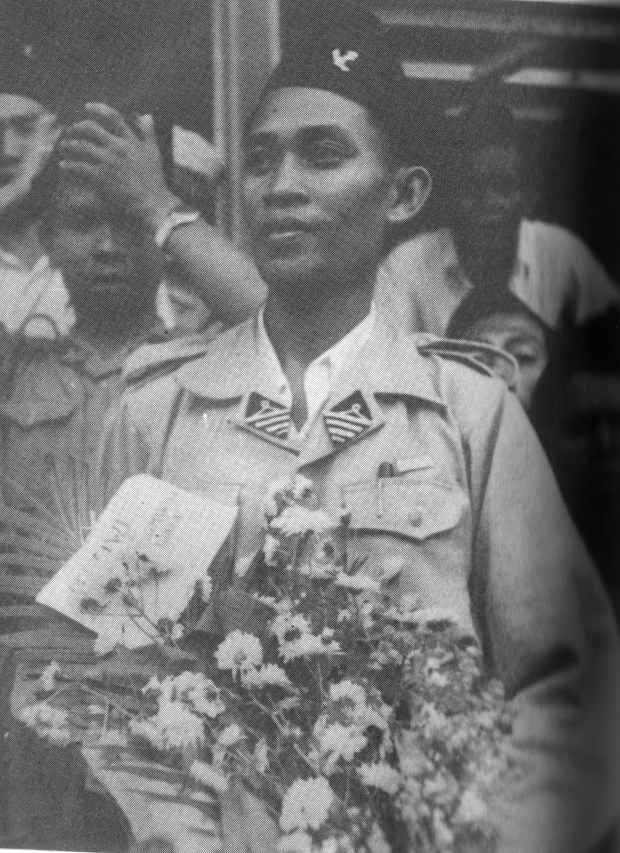
- Hasan Basry greeted by people of Kandangan after meeting between United Nations envoy and NICA

X/Lambung Mangkurat Regional Military Commander
- In office 17 July 1958 – 24 September 1958
- Succeeded by: A. Wahab Sjachranie

Personal details
- Born: 17 June 1923 Kandangan, Zuider en Oosterafdeeling van Borneo Residency, Dutch East Indies
- Died: 15 July 1984 (aged 61) Jakarta, Indonesia
- Awards: National Heroes of Indonesia

Military service
- Allegiance: Indonesia
- Branch/service: Indonesian Army
- Unit: infantry

Hasan Basry (17 June 1923 – 15 July 1984) was a military general, Indonesian nationalist leader, and was a key figure in the liberation of Kalimantan from Dutch rule. During the Indonesian National Revolution, he acted as the military representative of the Indonesian army in Kalimantan and led a guerrilla war against the Linggadjati Agreement. He was a key figure behind the 17 May Proclamation which rallied Kalimantan natives against Dutch rule in 1949. He was declared a National Hero of Indonesia in 2001.

== Early life ==
Hasan Basry was born in town of Kandangan, Zuider en Oosterafdeeling van Borneo residency, Dutch East Indies on 17 June 1923. He was at first educated at a Hollandsh Inlandsche School (a Dutch language school for native Indonesians), but later chose to pursue an Islamic education at a madrasa in his hometown. He then enrolled in an Islamic boarding school in Ponorogo, East Java. He was an active member of native Borneoan youth organizations in Surabaya, where he was exposed to the ideals of Indonesian nationalism.

== Revolutionary period ==
On 30 October 1945, not long after the Indonesian Declaration of Independence and early in the Indonesian National Revolution, Hasan Basry sneaked back into Kalimantan aboard the ship Bintang Tulen together with several other young militants (Indonesian: pemuda) from Kalimas Port in Surabaya. Upon arriving in Banjarmasin, he contacted another Indonesian nationalist figure in the region, A. A. Hamidhan to print and distribute pamphlets regarding proclamation of Indonesian independence to other towns and cities in Kalimantan such as Kandangan and Amuntai.

On 5 May 1946, he joined an Indonesian paramilitary group named Laskar Syaifullah. However, the organization was disbanded in September of that year after the mass arrest of its members by the Netherlands Indies Civil Administration. Former members of the organization regrouped and formed Benteng Indonesia (lit: Indonesian Fortress). Basry received a message from the Indonesian Navy command in Mojokerto to form a battalion under what would be known as ALRI 4th Division in Kalimantan. Thus he reorganized Benteng Indonesia as a more disciplined unit under the Indonesian Navy. Not long after Basry spread message of the independence proclamation, widespread revolt appeared in Kalimantan and Republican militias briefly captured the town of Marabahan. Basry's force controlled most of Kalimantan countryside while Dutch control were limited to cities and towns.

Basry was disappointed by agreements made by the Republican government with the Dutch, such as the Linggadjati Agreement and later the Renville Agreement which he saw as maintaining Dutch hegemony in Kalimantan. Therefore, he refused to obey his commanders in the Indonesian Navy and withdraw his forces behind the Van Mook Line on the island of Java, and instead continued his guerrilla campaign. The Dutch sent an ultimatum to his force to surrender and at one time surrounded his grandmother's house to look for him. In September 1949, the Dutch agreed to meet with Basry and his force for negotiation mediated by United Nations envoy. On 1 November 1949, his guerrilla force was incorporated into Lambung Mangkurat Division of the Indonesian Army and he was given the rank of lieutenant colonel.

== Post-revolution ==
After the war, he continued his education at Al-Azhar University in Egypt, and later The American University in Cairo from 1951 to 1955. In 1956, he became commander of 21st Infantry Regiment of Indonesian Army under South Kalimantan 4th Territorial Command. Basry was an anti-communist figure and disliked the growing influence of Communist Party of Indonesia (PKI) in Kalimantan. On 22 August 1960, he issued a decree banning PKI activities in South Kalimantan, which later would be followed by commanders of South Sulawesi and South Sumatra. The event, known as Three Souths Affair (Peristiwa Tiga Selatan) angered Sukarno, who demanded the letter to be retracted. Basry ignored Sukarno's demand, which caused rising tension between Indonesian Army and PKI, later culminated in subsequent purge of communist. Basry became Deputy of Territorial Commando of Kalimantan in 1961 and also a member of People's Consultative Assembly from 1960 to 1966. He retired from the military in 1963 and his career became focused on politics, as he became a representative in People's Representative Council between 1978 and 1982. During this period, he was also active in the establishment of Lambung Mangkurat University and became its first rector.

Basry died on 15 July 1984 due to illness and is buried in Banjarbaru after the request of Idham Chalid.

== Legacy ==
He was declared a National Hero of Indonesia (Indonesian: Pahlawan Nasional) in 2001. A hospital in Kandangan was named after him, and several roads in Kalimantan is also named after him. Other than that, an Indonesian Navy ship, KRI Hasan Basri is also named after him.
