= KBU =

KBU may refer to

- Kasem Bundit University
- Copenhagen Football Association, Københavns Boldspil-Union
- Gusti Syamsir Alam Airport IATA code
