= Three Souths Affair =

Three Souths Affair (Indonesian: Peristiwa Tiga Selatan) was a standoff between Indonesian president Sukarno and commanders of military region in South Kalimantan, South Sulawesi, and South Sumatra. The standoff began when on 22 August 1960, Hasan Basry as commander of South Kalimantan military region, banned all activities related to Indonesian Communist Party. Sukarno demanded Basry to lift the ban, which he rejected. The event escalated when commanders of South Sulawesi and South Sumatera followed the same move as what Basry did, which angered Sukarno. Basry further confronted Sukarno during regional commander annual meeting in November 1960, questioning why Sukarno wanted him to lift the ban.

Because of Basry's position as a member of People's Consultative Assembly and a respected figure of people in Kalimantan due to Kalimantan Proclamation of 1949, Sukarno could not sanction him. The event further deteriorated relation between Indonesian Armed Forces and Indonesian Communist Party until coup d'etat by Suharto and communist purge of 1965–66.
