= Ardiansyah (surname) =

Ardiansyah is an Indonesian name. Notable people with the name include:

- Ardiansyah (1951–2017), Indonesian chess Grandmaster
- Anang Ardiansyah (1938–2015), Indonesian artist
- Bima Riski Ardiansyah (born 1990), Indonesian basketball player
- Muhammad Ardiansyah (born 2003), Indonesian footballer
- Riyan Ardiansyah (born 1996), Indonesian footballer

== See also ==
- Rifki Ardiansyah Arrosyiid (born 1997), Indonesian karateka
