= Kalimantan Physical Revolution =

Conflict in Dutch Borneo, 1945–1950

- Part of the Indonesian National Revolution
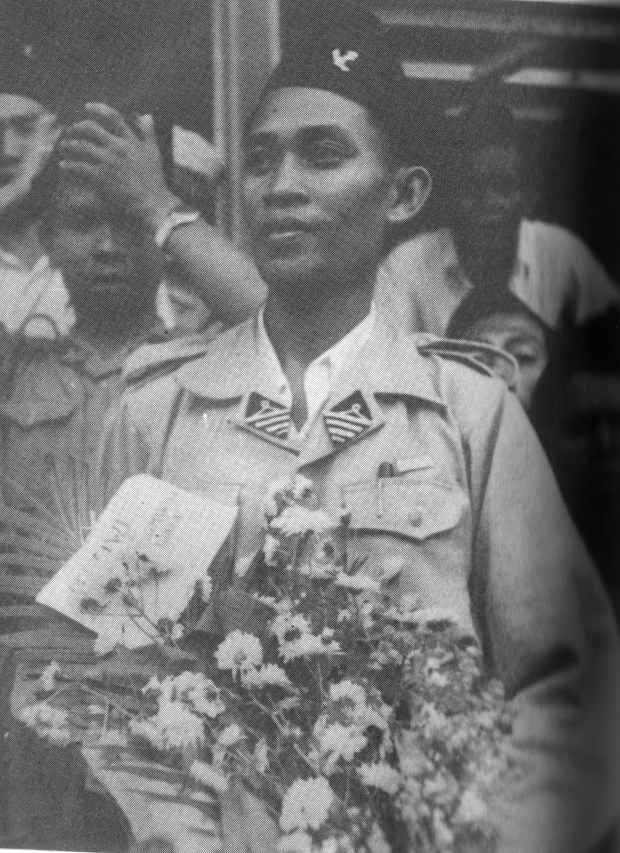
- Hasan Basry greeted by the people of Kalimantan in Kandangan after a meeting with NICA and United Nations envoy about sovereignty transfer.
Date	1945–1950
Location	Various cities and regions in today's Kalimantan, Indonesia
Result	Indonesian political victory; Temporary pacification and economic blockade of Kalimantan urban communities by Allied forces.
Territorial changes	United States of Indonesia dissolved.

Belligerents
People's Security Army (Note: until 1946); Indonesian National Armed Forces (Note: form 1946); Indonesian Air Force; Indonesian Navy; ALRI 4th Division; Dayak Unity Party; Dayak In Action; Various militia and decentralized armed insurgencies	Dutch East Indies; Great Dayak; Pontianak Sultanate; Australia

Commanders and leaders
Mohammad Noor; Hasan Basry; Tjilik Riwut; A. A. Hamidhan; Idham Chalid; Various decentralized leaders	Hubertus van Mook; L. H. van Oyen; Sultan Hamid II

The Kalimantan Physical Revolution (Indonesian: Revolusi fisik Kalimantan) was an armed conflict between Indonesian nationalists and pro-Dutch forces in Dutch Borneo in the second half of the 1940s. It began with the end of the Japanese occupation of the Dutch East Indies and the 1945 Proclamation of Indonesian Independence by Sukarno and lasted until the Dutch withdrew from most of Indonesia in 1949. It can be considered part of the larger Indonesian National Revolution.

After the surrender of the Japanese at the end of World War II, allied forces took control of the Dutch East Indies, including Dutch Borneo. The return of Dutch authorities was rejected by a majority of the native population, resulting in various regional armed conflicts between the Royal Netherlands East Indies Army and Indonesian nationalist forces. Allied military forces in Borneo were in a strong position after an early conflict in August 1945, and they were able to pacify local nationalist uprisings and impose a blockade to prevent military aid and exchange in personnel from nationalist strongholds in Java and Sumatra. Later, nationalists with connections to Borneo were able to breach the military blockade to provide information on revolutionary events in Java and Sumatra, declaring Kalimantan an inseparable part of the new Indonesian republic in the Kalimantan proclamation.

== Background ==
Borneo was home to several native sultanates such as Sultanate of Banjar, Kutai, and Sultanate of Bulungan. Prior to 18th and 19th century, the Dutch began to intervene in internal matters of native sultanates, resulting conflict between the two. The most notable was Banjarmasin War, resulting in Dutch authorities eliminating most of royal institutions and declaring the sultanate cease to exist after 1863. Dutch control over the island remained weak and mostly handed over local authorities and royals that are supporting Dutch colonial establishment.

Indonesian nationalism, which only arose in Java in the 1910s, was unheard of in Borneo until the Indonesian National Party establish branches across the island and began exporting the ideals of the Indonesian National Awakening there. The military occupation by Japan also fueled nationalist and pro-Asia sentiment, in addition to giving some natives military training which they later used against allied forces.

== Conflict ==
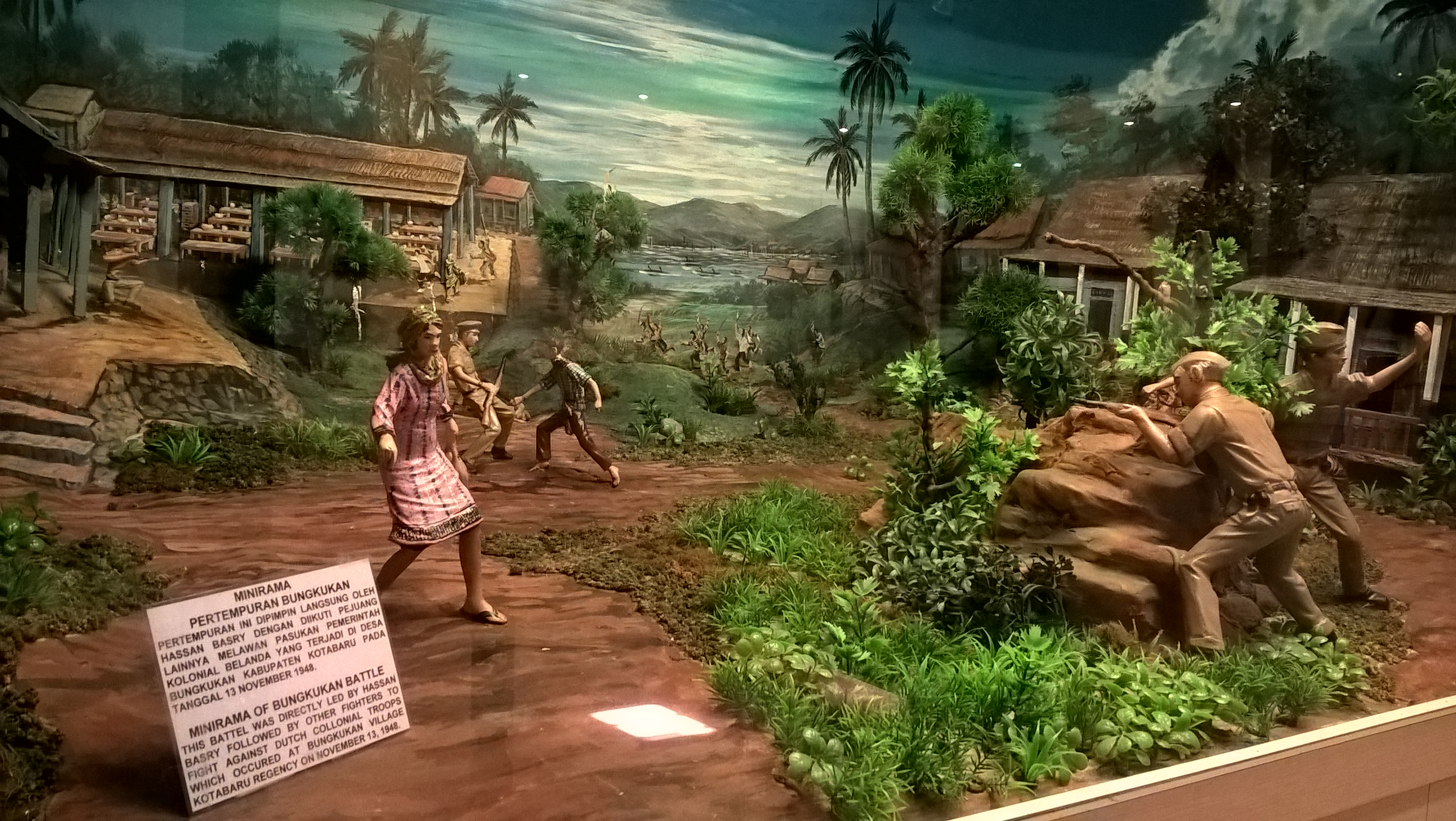
Diorama depicting a battle in Kotabaru Regency

After the Indonesian declaration of Independence in 1945, various militia and armed organizations were formed across the archipelago. While nationalist sentiment was widespread between common people and grassroot movements, it was unpopular within aristocrats, especially in Kutai, East Kalimantan where royals there established a Dutch-supported East Kalimantan state. (There was also a Dutch puppet state in West Kalimantan led by Syarif Hamid II of Pontianak.) This later caused tensions between royals and people of Kutai, some of whom formed the Panitia Aksi Anti Swapraja (Committee for Anti-Royalty Action) and actively opposed the Dutch puppet state. In Sambas, West Kalimantan, in October 1945, a clash occurred between nationalists wanted to replace flag of the Netherlands with red and white flag on official buildings, and pro-Dutch partisans, later known as "Bloody Sambas" (Indonesian: Sambas berdarah).

Following the clash, several other engagements also occurred within inland regions in Landak and Melawi. Nationalist opposition to the Dutch was severely impeded by the Dutch military strength and the blockade which cut off nationalists from their counterparts in Java. In South Kalimantan, armed opposition was led by Hasan Basry in Meratus Mountains, with smaller conflicts occurring in Kotabaru and Tanah Laut. Anti-royalty and anti-Dutch sentiment were thought to be driven by influence of Communist Party of Indonesia in the region, which was exceptionally strong in South and East Kalimantan. The Indonesian Navy, which had been founded in 1946, also sent secret emissaries to establish communication with nationalists in Kalimantan, to give them support and to attempt to bring them under their command. However, those armed elements did not have the power to displace the Dutch, who forced an agreement for the United States of Indonesia in 1946 in which Dutch puppet states in Borneo and elsewhere would be equal partners to the republic of Indonesia.

In October 1947, newly formed Indonesian Airforce (AURI) conducted its first ever airborne operation led by Tjilik Riwut in what today is Central Kalimantan using a Douglas DC-3 aircraft disguised as civilian plane. The group, named MN/1001 (Muhammad Noor 1001), consist of only 14 personnel, mostly Kalimantan-born. The goal was to break Dutch-imposed blockade and send back several Kalimantan-born nationalist back from Java. Only 13 personnel were deployed from the plane and one allegedly deserted, leaving only 12 on the ground. The group engaged against Dutch troops close to village of Pahandut, today Palangka Raya city. The group was ambushed on 23 November, leaving three killed while the rest fled until the entirety of the group was captured on 7 December. They were jailed in Banjarmasin before released in the aftermath of Dutch–Indonesian Round Table Conference.

== The Kalimantan Proclamation of 1949 ==
On 17 May 1949, Hasan Basry declared Kalimantan as integral part of Indonesian Republic and opposed any act to grant it independence from Indonesia. The proclamation was read on Kandangan and later printed and circulated around Banjarmasin and Pontianak. Prior to declaration, Dutch authorities send an ultimatum to Hasan Basry and his followers to surrender.

Indonesian version:

“PROKLAMASI“

MERDEKA, DENGAN INI KAMI RAKYAT INDONESIA DI KALIMANTAN SELATAN, MEMPERMAKLUMKAN BERDIRINYA PEMERINTAHAN GUBERNUR TENTARA DARI “ALRI” MELINGKUNGI SELURUH DAERAH KALIMANTAN SELATAN MENJADI BAGIAN DARI REPUBLIK INDONESIA, UNTUK MEMENUHI ISI PROKLAMASI 17 AGUSTUS 1945 YANG DITANDATANGANI OLEH PRESIDEN SOEKARNO DAN WAKIL PRESIDEN MOHAMMAD HATTA. HAL-HAL YANG BERSANGKUTAN DENGAN PEMINDAHAN KEKUASAAN AKAN DIPERTAHANKAN DAN KALAU PERLU DIPERJUANGKAN SAMPAI TETES DARAH YANG PENGHABISAN.

TETAP MERDEKA !

KANDANGAN,17 MEI. ATAS NAMA RAKYAT INDONESIA DI KALIMANTAN SELATAN

GUBERNUR TENTARA

HASSAN BASRY

English version:

"PROCLAMATION"

MERDEKA (FREEDOM),
WITH THIS WE PEOPLE OF INDONESIA IN SOUTH KALIMANTAN REGION REQUEST THE ESTABLISHMENT OF A MILITARY GOVERNOR UNDER THE INDONESIAN NAVY, INCLUDING ALL THE SOUTH KALIMANTAN REGION, TO BE PART OF THE INDONESIAN REPUBLIC, TO MEET THE CONTENT OF 1945 INDEPENDENCE PROCLAMATION SIGNED BY PRESIDENT SOEKARNO AND VICE PRESIDENT MOHAMMAD HATTA. CONCERNING THE TRANSFER OF POWER WILL BE MAINTAINED AND IF NEED TO BE STRUGGLED TO A DROP OF BLOOD THAT DRIVES.

STAY INDEPENDENT!

KANDANGAN, 17 MAY
IN THE NAME OF THE INDONESIAN PEOPLE IN SOUTH KALIMANTAN

MILITARY GOVERNOR

HASAN BASRY

== End of the conflict ==
After the proclamation, the conflict in Kalimantan continued to take place. The Dutch did not recognize the proclamation and made a military push to limit the actual reach of Basry's claim to establishing a new Indonesian territory on Kalimantan soil. Starting in the late summer, while the Dutch–Indonesian Round Table Conference was being negotiated in The Hague, Indonesian defense ministers Mohammad Hatta (replaced by Hamengkubuwono IX during the negotiations) sent a military force led by Major General Soehardjo to peacefully observe the state of affairs in Banjarmasin, where the Dutch KNIL forces were still mobilized. Yet the guerilla actions, strikes, targeted killings of KNIL soldiers, and theft of supplies from the Dutch side continued in late 1949. As the Republican position was strengthened, Basry attempted to impose military discipline over the remaining guerilla forces, some of whom had even conducted raids on Republican positions. However, the end of the military conflict came not as a result of military defeat of Dutch forces, but because the Netherlands were forced to cede sovereignty to Indonesia at the negotiating table in December 1949.

== Legacy ==
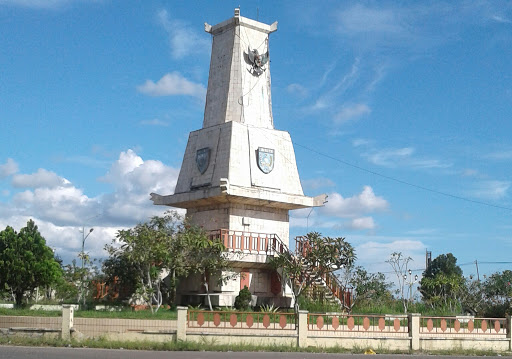
17 May Monument commemorating the proclamation and guerilla struggle, in Banjar Regency.

Several monuments and statues exist in Kalimantan to commemorate the conflict and 17 May Proclamation. 17th May Stadium was named after the proclamation. A folk song titled Kampung Batuah created by local artist Anang Ardiansyah contains lyrics about the event.
