= ALRI 4th Division =

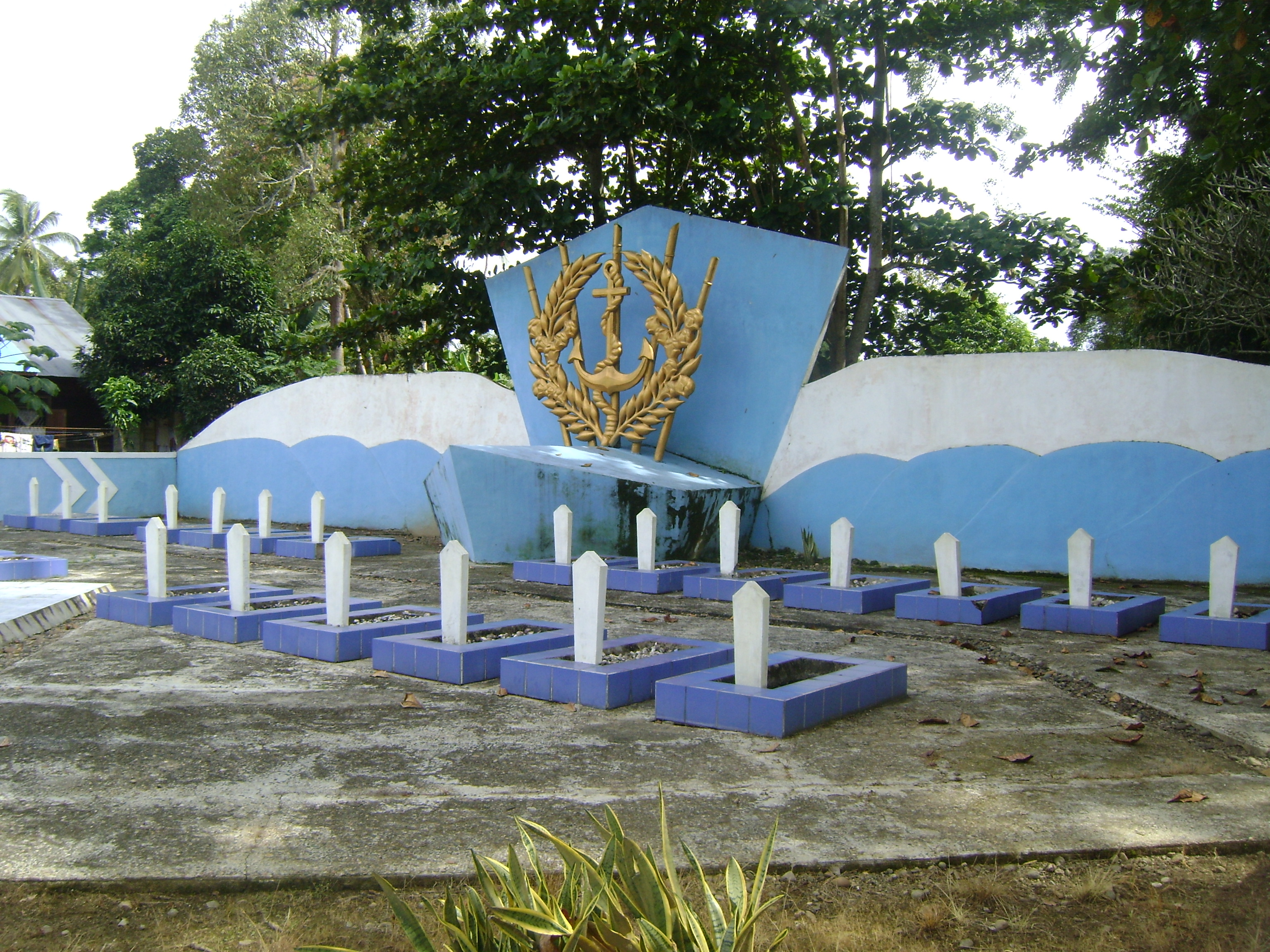
War ceremetery of ALRI 4th Division members in Central Hulu Sungai Regency

ALRI 4th Division (Indonesian: Angkatan Laut Republik Indonesia Divisi IV) was a formation of Indonesian Navy during Indonesian National Revolution. It was responsible for military operations in Kalimantan during the war. Founded on 4 April 1946, it was divided into three sectors each with their own assigned region in Kalimantan. The division was famous for its involvement in Kalimantan Physical Revolution.

== Structure ==
The division was divided into three sectors each with its own assigned region within Kalimantan.

- ALRI 4th Division Sector A (South Kalimantan based in South Hulu Sungai Regency)
- ALRI 4th Division Sector B (West Kalimantan based in Pontianak)
- ALRI 4th Division Sector C (East Kalimantan)
