= Kotabaru Regency =

Regency in South Kalimantan, Indonesia

Coordinates: 3.0000°S 116.0000°E

Kotabaru Regency Kabupaten Kotabaru
- Regency
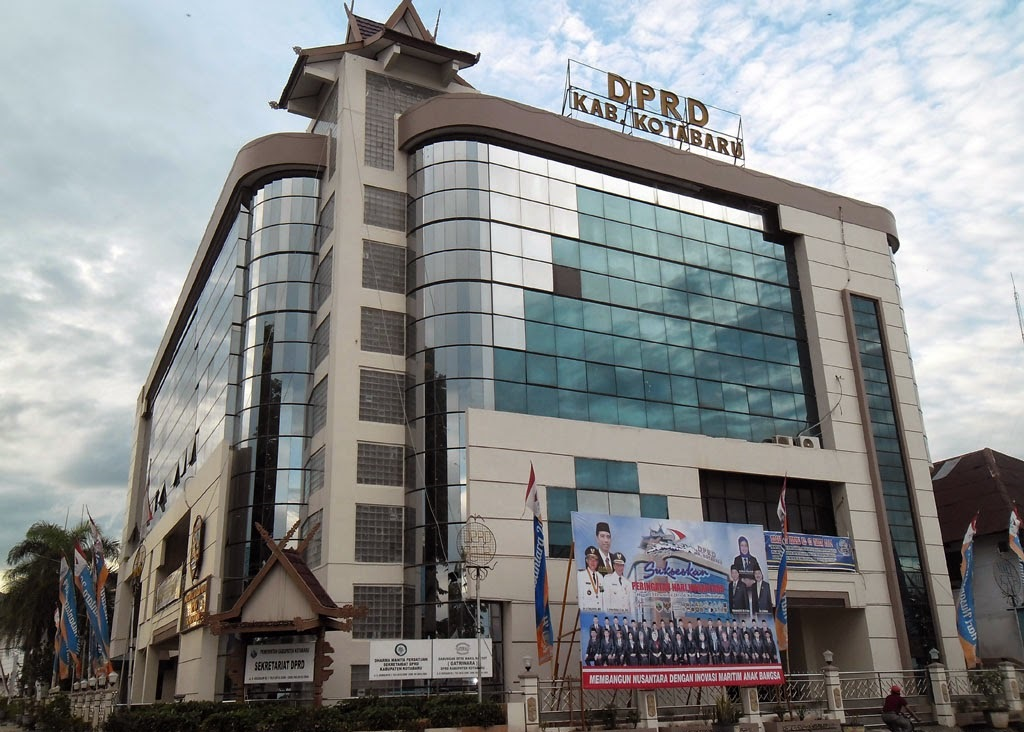
- Parliament Building of Kotabaru Regency

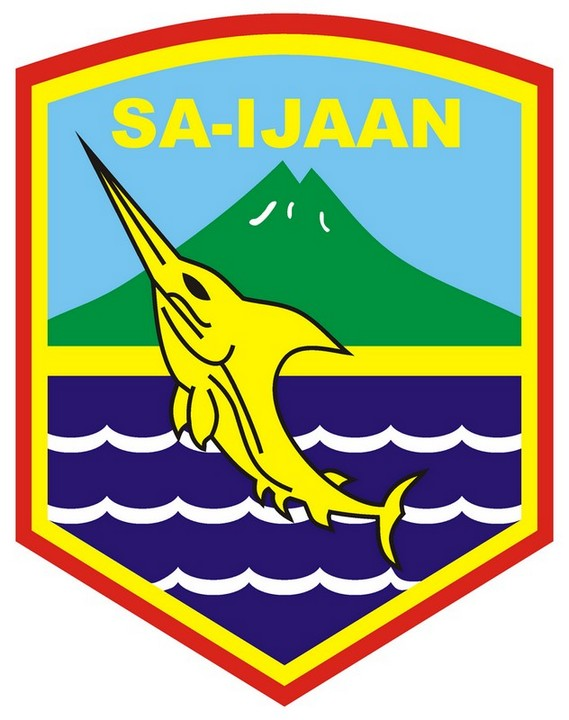
- Coat of arms
- Motto(s): Sa-ijaan (Banjarese) (Unanimous, one heart and agree)
- Country: Indonesia
- Province: South Kalimantan
- Regency seat: Kotabaru

Government
  - Regent: Muhammad Rusli
  - Vice Regent: Syairi Mukhlis

Area
  - Total: 9,354.93 km^{2} (3,611.96 sq mi)

Population (mid 2025 estimate)
  - Total: 336,785
  - Density: 36.0008/km^{2} (93.2417/sq mi)
- Time zone: UTC+8 (WITA)
- Area code: +62 518
- HDI (2019): ▲0.689 (Medium)
- Website: kotabarukab.go.id

Kotabaru Regency is one of the eleven regencies in the Indonesian province of South Kalimantan. It consists of two parts; the smaller (2,361.61 km^{2}) but more populated insular part comprises Laut Island ("Sea Island"), the largest island off the coast of Kalimantan (Indonesian Borneo), together with the smaller Sebuku Island off Laut Island's east coast and other even smaller islands nearby; the larger (6,993.82 km^{2}) but less populated part consists of the 12 districts on the mainland of Kalimantan. The regency as a whole has an area of 9,354.93 km^{2}, and had a population of 290,142 at the 2010 Census and 325,622 at the 2020 Census. The official estimate as at mid 2025 was 336,785 (comprising 173,678 males and 163,107 females), of whom 180,973 were in the insular part and 156,712 in the mainland part of the regency. The regency seat is located at the large town of Kotabaru at the northern tip of Laut Island.

It has the second largest GRDP in the province after the city of Banjarmasin, mainly due to its coal industry. It is also the largest regency by land area in the province.

== History ==
=== Etymology ===
The regency got its name from Kotabaru town, which is the administrative center of the regency. The town was previously a village that grew because of coal mining around 1873 and 1881. The coal mines were mostly owned by nobles of small kingdoms in the islands such as Pagatan and Kusan. The village grows into a town and called Kotta Baroe, which literally means "new town". Throughout the 20th century until today, the region became commonly known as Kotabaru.

=== Early history ===
In the region of what is now the regency, there were several petty kingdoms and sultanates which were closely tied to the Sultanate of Banjar. It is estimated that these kingdoms came into existence around after 1786, following the foundation of the Kusan and Pagatan Kingdoms on the island of Laut by Prince Amir from the Kingdom of Kayutangi (modern Martapura) Both kingdoms later on became subject to Kayutangi, and were obliged to pay tributes. In 1840, Kusan and Pagatan entered a personal union after the fourth king of Kusan, Jaya Sumitra, gave the kingdom to Arung Abdul Karim who was the king of Pagatan, thereby assuming control over the entire island of Laut. In 1881, son of Jaya Sumitra, Prince Husin Kusuma took the title of fourth king of Laut Island. Husin Kusuma soon died in 1900 when taking a hajj and was succeeded by Prince Aminullah who would become the last king of Laut.

=== Colonial era ===
In 1905, the Dutch East Indies government declared the end of the small kingdoms' existence on the island, following the defeat of the Banjar Sultanate after the Banjarmasin War. The region was then directly ruled by the colonial government instead of through local kings and officials. In 1942, the region was occupied by the Empire of Japan during World War II.

In the aftermath of the war and the Indonesian National Revolution, the returning Dutch proposed a puppet state of Southeast Borneo Federation in the region. This was opposed and conflicts erupted in the region, known as Kalimantan Physical Revolution. On 1 September 1945, Committee for Assisting Republic Indonesian (BPRI, Badan Pembantu Republik Indonesia) was formed in the town of Pagatan, and spread its branch across Laut Island. On 6 December 1945, students and Republican militia passed a motion declaring the region to be part of the Indonesian Republic. On 7 February 1946, a battle broke out between Republican militia and Dutch soldiers who tried to land on the beach of Laut island around the village of Kampung Baru.

Following the return of Dutch authority, several demonstrations were held in town of Pagatan and Kotabaru and Indonesian flag was hoisted in a wet market in Pagatan in October 1949. Southeast Borneo Federation were eventually dissolved by its own parliament and joined Indonesian Republic following transfer of sovereignty.

=== After independence ===
The regency on its own came into existence in 1953, when it was composed of administrative districts in Laut Island, Southern Tanah Bumbu, Northern Tanah Bumbu, and Pasir Residency. However, Pasir was cut off from the regency in 1959 after the division of Kalimantan into several provinces in 1956, and became a regency of East Kalimantan. Following the fall of Suharto and the rapid decentralization that followed, there was a demand from mainland districts (Tanah Bumbu) to secede from the regency and form their own; this demand has been caused by dissatisfaction on the mainland with the regency government on Laut Island, as the island is more developed than the mainland Kalimantan parts. The southern part of the Tanah Bumbu region (the southern 40.7% of the mainland area) was split off from the rest of Kotabaru Regency on 25 February 2003 and made into a separate regency. The northern part of the Tanah Bumbu region (the northern 59.3% of the mainland area) also demanded separation; however, by 2026 this additional split has not materialized because of the Indonesian Government moratorium on the created of new regencies.

== Geography ==
=== Climate ===
Kotabaru has a tropical savanna climate (Aw) with heavy rainfall year-round.

Climate data for Kotabaru (Gusti Syamsir Alam Airport) (1991–2020 normals)
| Month | Jan | Feb | Mar | Apr | May | Jun | Jul | Aug | Sep | Oct | Nov | Dec | Year |
|---|---|---|---|---|---|---|---|---|---|---|---|---|---|
| Record high °C (°F) | 34.5 (94.1) | 34.1 (93.4) | 34.5 (94.1) | 34.3 (93.7) | 34.1 (93.4) | 34.1 (93.4) | 33.9 (93.0) | 35.8 (96.4) | 35.0 (95.0) | 38.0 (100.4) | 35.5 (95.9) | 34.3 (93.7) | 38.0 (100.4) |
| Mean daily maximum °C (°F) | 30.8 (87.4) | 31.0 (87.8) | 31.3 (88.3) | 31.5 (88.7) | 31.8 (89.2) | 31.4 (88.5) | 31.2 (88.2) | 31.7 (89.1) | 32.3 (90.1) | 32.4 (90.3) | 31.8 (89.2) | 31.1 (88.0) | 31.5 (88.7) |
| Daily mean °C (°F) | 26.3 (79.3) | 26.3 (79.3) | 26.3 (79.3) | 26.5 (79.7) | 26.5 (79.7) | 26.2 (79.2) | 25.9 (78.6) | 26.0 (78.8) | 26.3 (79.3) | 26.5 (79.7) | 26.6 (79.9) | 26.4 (79.5) | 26.3 (79.3) |
| Mean daily minimum °C (°F) | 23.8 (74.8) | 23.8 (74.8) | 23.9 (75.0) | 24.0 (75.2) | 24.0 (75.2) | 23.5 (74.3) | 22.9 (73.2) | 22.5 (72.5) | 22.8 (73.0) | 23.3 (73.9) | 23.9 (75.0) | 23.9 (75.0) | 23.5 (74.3) |
| Record low °C (°F) | 19.8 (67.6) | 20.1 (68.2) | 21.2 (70.2) | 21.1 (70.0) | 19.4 (66.9) | 19.7 (67.5) | 17.4 (63.3) | 18.3 (64.9) | 18.0 (64.4) | 17.3 (63.1) | 19.4 (66.9) | 20.6 (69.1) | 17.3 (63.1) |
| Average precipitation mm (inches) | 255.1 (10.04) | 210.6 (8.29) | 241.4 (9.50) | 186.5 (7.34) | 206.6 (8.13) | 232.5 (9.15) | 187.4 (7.38) | 118.5 (4.67) | 111.4 (4.39) | 120.9 (4.76) | 177.6 (6.99) | 217.9 (8.58) | 2,266.4 (89.23) |
| Average precipitation days (≥ 1.0 mm) | 18.6 | 16.8 | 18.2 | 16.6 | 15.9 | 15.1 | 12.1 | 9.9 | 9.5 | 12.7 | 15.1 | 17.0 | 177.5 |
| Mean monthly sunshine hours | 110.8 | 101.7 | 127.2 | 123.2 | 134.2 | 118.4 | 140.7 | 163.1 | 156.0 | 140.8 | 117.7 | 107.3 | 1,541.1 |
Source: World Meteorological Organization

== Governance ==
=== Administrative districts ===
At the time of the 2010 Census, Kotabaru Regency was divided into twenty districts (kecamatan), but an additional district (Pulau Laut Tanjung Selayar) was added subsequently from part of Pulau Laut Barat District, and then in 2020 a further district (Pulau Laut Sigam) was added from the most northerly part of Pulau Laut Utara District (which includes the administrative capital, Kotabaru town).
The districts are listed below with their areas and their populations at the 2010 Census and the 2020 Census, together with the official estimates as at mid 2025. The table also includes the locations of the district administrative centres, the number of administrative villages in each district (a total of 198 rural desa and 4 urban kelurahan), the number of (named) islands in each district, and its post code. The first ten districts as listed comprise the southern or insular part of the regency, while the last twelve districts comprise the northern or mainland portion (Tanah Bumbu Utara).

| Kode Wilayah | Name of District (kecamatan) | Area in km^{2} | Pop'n 2010 Census | Pop'n 2020 Census | Pop'n mid 2025 Estimate | Admin centre | No. of villages | No. of islands | Post code |
|---|---|---|---|---|---|---|---|---|---|
| 63.02.01 | Pulau Sembilan (Sembilan Island) | 43.10 | 5,649 | 6,206 | 6,139 | Tengah | 5 | 19 | 72181 |
| 63.02.02 | Pulau Laut Barat (West Laut Island} | 245.52 | 18,668 | 10,192 | 10,580 | Sebanti | 11 | 5 | 72153 |
| 63.02.21 | Pulau Laut Tanjung Selayar | 57.97 | ^{(a)} | 10,633 | 12,128 | Tanjung Pelayar | 10 | - | 72151 |
| 63.02.03 | Pulau Laut Seletan (South Laut Island) | 325.93 | 8,792 | 10,242 | 11,286 | Tanjung Seloka | 8 | 10 | 72157 |
| 63.02.20 | Pulau Laut Kepulauan (Laut Island Islands) | 116.68 | 10,801 | 13,620 | 14,979 | Tanjung Lalak Selatan | 9 | 11 | 72154 |
| 63.02.04 | Pulau Laut Timur (East Laut Island) | 621.53 | 12,796 | 14,218 | 14,282 | Berangas | 14 | 4 | 72152 |
| 63.02.05 | Pulau Sebuku (Sebuku Island) | 218.26 | 7,212 | 7,261 | 7,472 | Sungai Bali | 8 | 10 | 72155 |
| 63.02.06 | Pulau Laut Utara (North Laut Island) | 99.50 | 79,639 | 53,657 | 54,363 | Dirgahayu | 10 ^{(b)} | - | 72111 -72117 |
| 63.02.16 | Pulau Laut Tengah (Central Laut Island) | 591.19 | 9,385 | 11,411 | 12,147 | Salino | 7 | - | 72156 |
| 63.02.22 | Pulau Laut Sigam (Sigam Laut Island) | 36.98 | ^{(c)} | 36,577 | 36,697 | Sigam | 11 ^{(d)} | - | |
| 63.02.07 | Kelumpang Seletan (South Kelumpang) | 337.88 | 9,187 | 10,208 | 10,529 | Pantai | 9 | 6 | 72160 |
| 63.02.17 | Kelumpang Hilir | 300.71 | 20,089 | 24,441 | 24,929 | Serongga | 9 | 2 | 72161 |
| 63.02.08 | Kelumpang Hulu | 1,091.73 | 14,414 | 15,983 | 17,519 | Sungai Kupang | 10 | 5 | 72162 |
| 63.02.14 | Hampang | 1,591.24 | 10,158 | 12,556 | 13,531 | Hampang | 9 | - | 72163 |
| 63.02.15 | Sungai Durian | 934.29 | 10,400 | 11,716 | 12,558 | Manunggul Lama | 7 | 2 | 72167 |
| 63.02.09 | Kelumpang Tengah (Central Kelumpang) | 315.15 | 12,495 | 13,258 | 13,329 | Tanjung Batu | 13 | 5 | 72164 |
| 63.02.18 | Kelumpang Barat (West Kelumpang) | 483.99 | 5,343 | 7,421 | 8,290 | Bungkukan | 6 | 17 | 72164 -72167 |
| 63.03.10 | Kelumpang Utara (North Kelumpang) | 218.06 | 5,299 | 5,652 | 5,810 | Pudi | 7 | - | 72165 |
| 63.02.11 | Pamukan Seletan (South Pamukan) | 369.34 | 12,881 | 12,928 | 12,794 | Tanjung Samalantakan | 11 | 1 | 72168 |
| 63.02.12 | Sampanahan | 403.69 | 9,884 | 10,868 | 11,449 | Gunung Batu Besar | 10 | 10 | 72166 |
| 63.02.13 | Pamukan Utara (North Pamukan) | 572.00 | 18,070 | 16,281 | 14,863 | Bakau | 13 | - | 72169 |
| 63.02.19 | Pamukan Barat (West Pamukan) | 375.24 | 8,980 | 10,293 | 11,111 | Sengayam | 5 | - | 72169 |

Notes: (a) The 2010 population is included with the figure for Pulau Laut Barat District, from which the new district was divided.
(b) includes one kelurahan - Kotabaru Hulu (with 4,613 inhabitants in 2024) and nine desa of which the most populous are Semayap (16,137) and Dirgahayu (10,290).
(c) The 2010 population is included with the figure for Pulau Laut Utara District, from which the new district was divided on 3 February 2020.
(d) includes three kelurahan - Baharu Selatan (with 4,961 inhabitants in 2024), Kotabaru Hilir (3,184 inhabitants) and Kotabaru Tengah (4,115 inhabitants), plus eight desa of which the most populous are Hilir Muara (5,165) and Baharu Utara (4,996).

=== Local government ===
It is a second-level administrative division equivalent to a city. As a regency, it is headed by a regent who is elected democratically. Head of districts are appointed directly by the regent with the recommendation of the regency secretary. Executive power lies with the regent and vice regent while legislative function is exercised by the regency's parliament.

== Economy ==
The GRDP of the Kotabaru Regency is valued at 23.79 trillion rupiahs in 2020, which is the second biggest in the province after Banjarmasin. Nominally, this was a decrease of 153.47 billion rupiahs from 2019 which were valued at 24.12 trillion rupiahs. The decrease was caused by deflation and economic downturn during COVID-19 pandemic as well as general decline of mining industry. The economy experienced contraction of 1.87% in 2020 compared to previous year.

The economy of the regency is undergoing a restructurization, with the general decline of primary sector and a shift to the tertiary sector, as with many regions in Indonesia. This is mostly seen in 2020 where the combined figures for mining, agriculture, and fishery contributed to 37.25% of the regency's GRDP compared to 38.51% in 2016. As of 2020, the biggest single sector that contributed to the regency's GRDP was manufacturing with contribution of 33.80%. This followed by agriculture with 19.07%, mining with 18.18%, and transportation with 6.12%. The manufacturing industry consists mostly of food and drink-related industries as well as the palm oil processing industry. There are significant numbers of crude palm oil factories in the regency. Other than that, there is significant production of tobacco, textiles, furniture, and paper pulp.

The agriculture sector, which is the second biggest in the regency, is dominated by commodities such as palm oil plantation, maize, and rice. The third biggest sector in the regency is mining that is dominated by coal production as well as iron ore that are exported mostly to India and China.

Poverty rate as of 2020 was 4.22% and unemployment rate in 2020 was 4.96%.

== Demographics ==
The regency had a population of 325,622 people in 2020, with an average annual population growth of 1.08% from 2010 to 2020. By mid 2024 the population was 332,787, with an average annual population growth of 0.73% from 2020 to 2024. North Laut Island (Pulau Laut Utara) District, where the regency seat is located, is the most populated district with 53,889 people in 2024, while the least populated district is North Kelumpang District with just 5,814 people. The most densely populated districts are Pulau Laut Sigam District with a density of 986 people per square kilometre in mid 2024, followed by North Laut Island District with a density of 541 people per square kilometre, while the least densely populated district is Hampang District with just 8 people per square kilometre.

The fastest growing district was West Kelumpang with 3.17% growth from 2010 to 2020, while the slowest was North Pamukan District with decline of 1.06% between 2010 and 2020. Sex ratio in the regency was 107, which means there are 107 male per 100 female population. This however varies from district to district, with Sembilan Island District the lowest with a figure of 103.5 and the highest was Central Laut Island District with a figure of 111.7. As with most of other regions in Indonesia, the population is relatively young and economically active, numbering 157,363 people in 2020.

The majority of the regency's population are Muslims, with a figure of 299,910 people in 2020, followed by Protestants with 10,903, Catholics with 3,595, Buddhists with 2,513, Hindus with 1,916, and followers of folk religions numbering around 6,128. Life expectancy in the regency was 69.21 years which is slightly lower than provincial and national average.

== Infrastructure ==
=== Education ===
There are total 221 kindergartens, 267 elementary schools, 77 junior high schools, and 34 senior high schools. In addition, there are seven vocational high schools and three higher education institutions. All higher education institutions in the regency are private, which are Paris Barantai Teaching College, Kotabaru Polytech, and Darul Ulum Tarbiyah College. All of them are located in North Laut Island district around town of Kotabaru. The regency has a public library owned by regency government, which also located in town of Kotabaru. School participation rate in the regency was 98.86%.

=== Healthcare ===
There's one hospital in the regency, 18 polyclinics, 66 puskesmas, and 12 pharmacies in the regency. The only hospital in the regency, Prince Jaya Sumitra Regional Hospital, is a public hospital owned and managed by the regency government. It is located in North Laut Island district in Kotabaru town, and classified as C-class hospital by Ministry of Health.

=== Transportation ===
There are total 1,205 kilometers of road in the regency. Angkots are abundand in the town of Kotabaru as means to get around and regulated by regency government, divided into five fixed routes as of 2009. In 2020, the regency government allowed taxi and travel services from rural villages to run their service in the town. This decision was met with protest from drivers and owners from angkots in town due to fear of being outcompeted. Main port of the regency is Stagen Port, located in North Laut Island district and considered a regional hub. The regency is served by Gusti Syamsir Alam Airport.

=== Others ===
There are 693 mosques in the regency, 25 churches, 8 Balinese temple, and 7 Chinese Buddhist temple.
