= Gusti Sjamsir Alam Airport =

Airport in Kotabaru Regency, South Kalimantan, Indonesia

Gusti Syamsir Alam Airport Bandar Udara Gusti Syamsir Alam
- IATA: KBU; ICAO: WAOK

Summary
- Airport type: Public / Private
- Operator: Government of Indonesia
- Serves: Stagen, Kotabaru
- Location: Kotabaru Regency, South Kalimantan, Indonesia
- Time zone: WITA (UTC+08:00)
- Elevation AMSL: 1.2 m (3.9 ft)
- Coordinates: 03°17′45″S 116°09′51″E

Maps
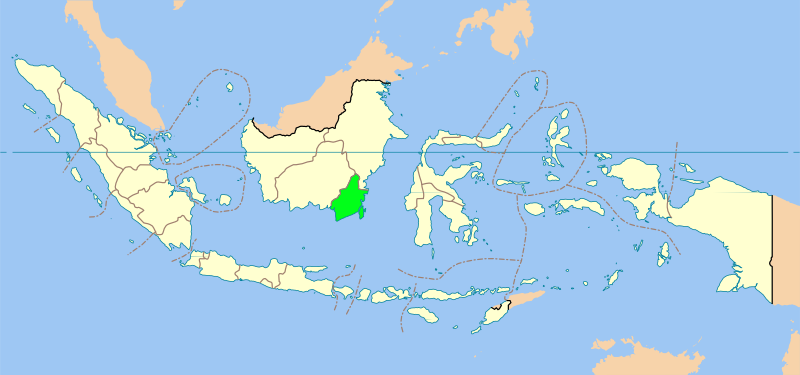
- South Kalimantan province in Indonesia

- Location of the airport in Indonesia Borneo

Runways
| Direction | Length | | Surface |
| Direction | m | ft | Surface |
|---|---|---|---|
| 15/33 | 1,650 | 5,413 | Asphalt |
- Sources: GCM, STV, ASN, flyerguide

Gusti Syamsir Alam Airport (IATA: KBU, ICAO: WAOK; formerly WRBK), or commonly known as Stagen Airport, is an airport on Laut Island in Kotabaru Regency, South Kalimantan, Indonesia.

== Airlines and destinations ==
| Airlines | Destinations |
|---|---|
| Wings Air | Banjarmasin |
