= Laut Island =

Island in South Kalimantan, Indonesia

Laut
Native name: pulau Laut (Indonesian)
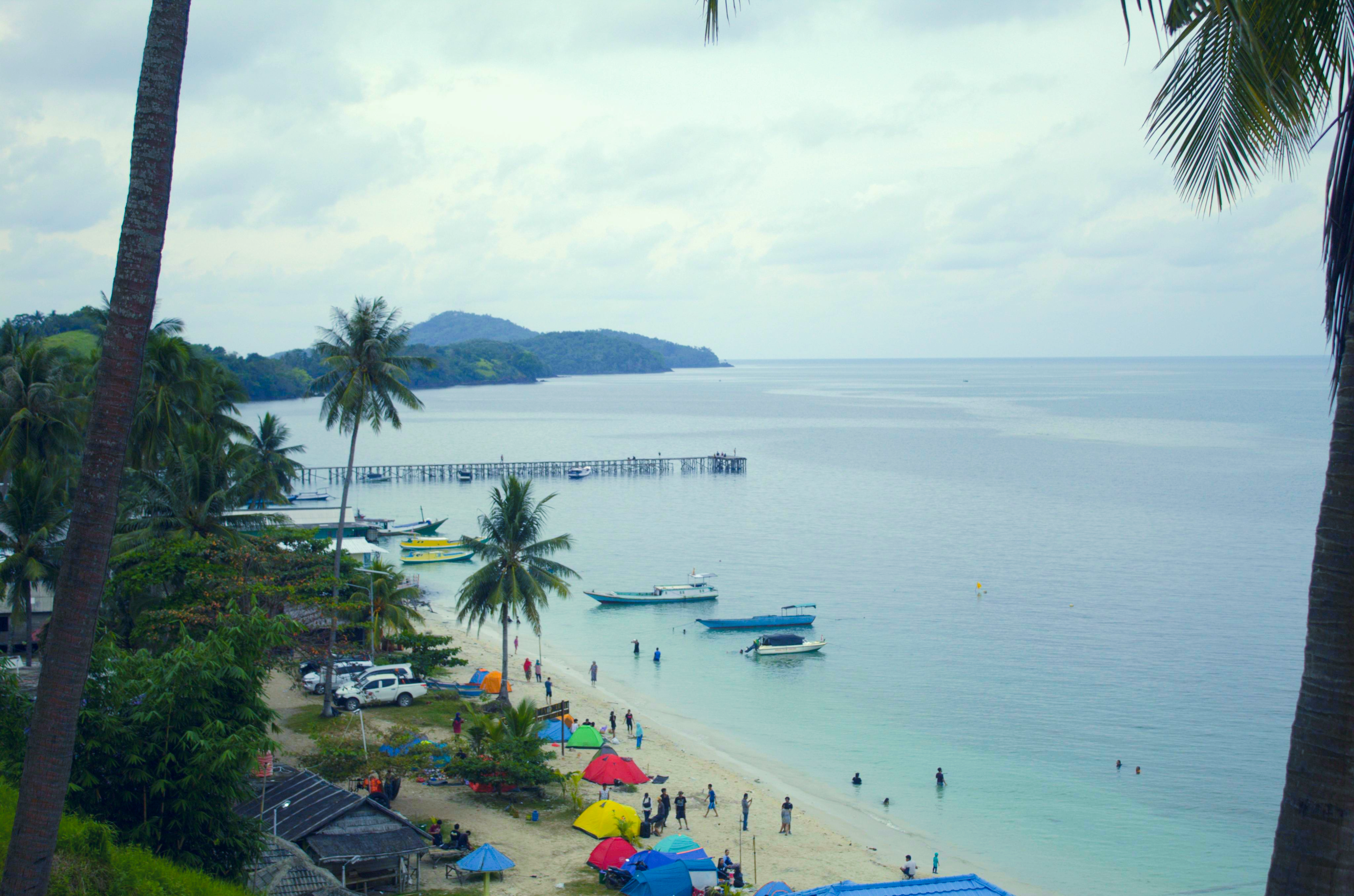
- Teluk Tamiyang Beach on Pulau Laut, Kotabaru, South Kalimantan

- Topographic locator map of Kalimantan Island, with the Laut Island seen to the southeast

Geography
- Location: Makassar Strait
- Coordinates: 3°40′50″S 116°09′49″E
- Area: 2,023.76 km^{2} (781.38 sq mi)

Administration
- Indonesia
- Province: South Kalimantan
- Largest settlement: Kotabaru

Demographics
- Population: 162,591 (2021)
- Pop. density: 80/km^{2} (210/sq mi)

Laut (Luh-OOt; Indonesian: Pulau Laut) is an island located in northern Java Sea, to the southwest of Makassar Strait. It is administratively part of the Kota Baru Regency in the Indonesian province of South Kalimantan. It has an area of 2,023.76 km^{2} (including offshore islets) and a population according to the official estimates as at mid 2021 of 162,591. The town of Kotabaru at the northern tip of the island is the administrative capital of the regency.
