= Anang Ardiansyah =

Banjarese singer and composer

- Born: 3 May 1938; Banjarmasin, Dutch East Indies
- Died: 7 August 2015 (aged 77); Banjarmasin, Indonesia
- Occupations: Songwriter, musician
- Years active: 1960–2015
- Known for: Banjarese songwriter and musician

Anang Ardiansyah (May 3, 1938 – August 7, 2015) was an Indonesian artist and songwriter, specifically in the Banjarese language. He was known to write around 103 Banjarese folk songs and was known popularly as Maestro of Banjarese music. His most famous works, "Paris Barantai," among other songs, are recognized as native folk songs of Banjarese culture and were played during the 2018 Asian Games opening ceremony in Gelora Bung Karno Stadium.

== Musical career ==
He started his musical career during senior high school, starting an orchestra named "Orkes Melayu Rindang Banua" together with several other Banjarese artists in Surabaya. "Paris Barantai" became one of his famous works; it was played on Radio Republik Indonesia and its recording sold more than 70,000 copies. He established his own studio later named "Tygaroon's Mini Studio" and released several more albums in the 80s and 90s.

He received award from governor of South Kalimantan, Rudy Ariffin in 2008. Other works from him such as "Uma Abah", "Kambang Goyang", and "Kasih Putus di Lubuk Badangsanak" are also famous until today and became an integral part of Banjarese culture & identity. Most of his songs portray Banjarese culture and the daily lives of Banjar people who are close to rivers. Other songs such as "Kampung Batuah" portray the struggle of Indonesian nationalists during Kalimantan Physical Revolution.

== Others ==
He served in the Indonesian Army from 1962 to 1992 with the highest ranking as colonel in Kodam XII/Tanjungpura.
