= Tapin Regency =

Regency in South Kalimantan, Indonesia

Coordinates: 2.9167°S 115.0333°E

Tapin Regency Kabupaten Tapin
- Regency

Other transcription(s)
  - Jawi: كابوڤاتين تاڤين
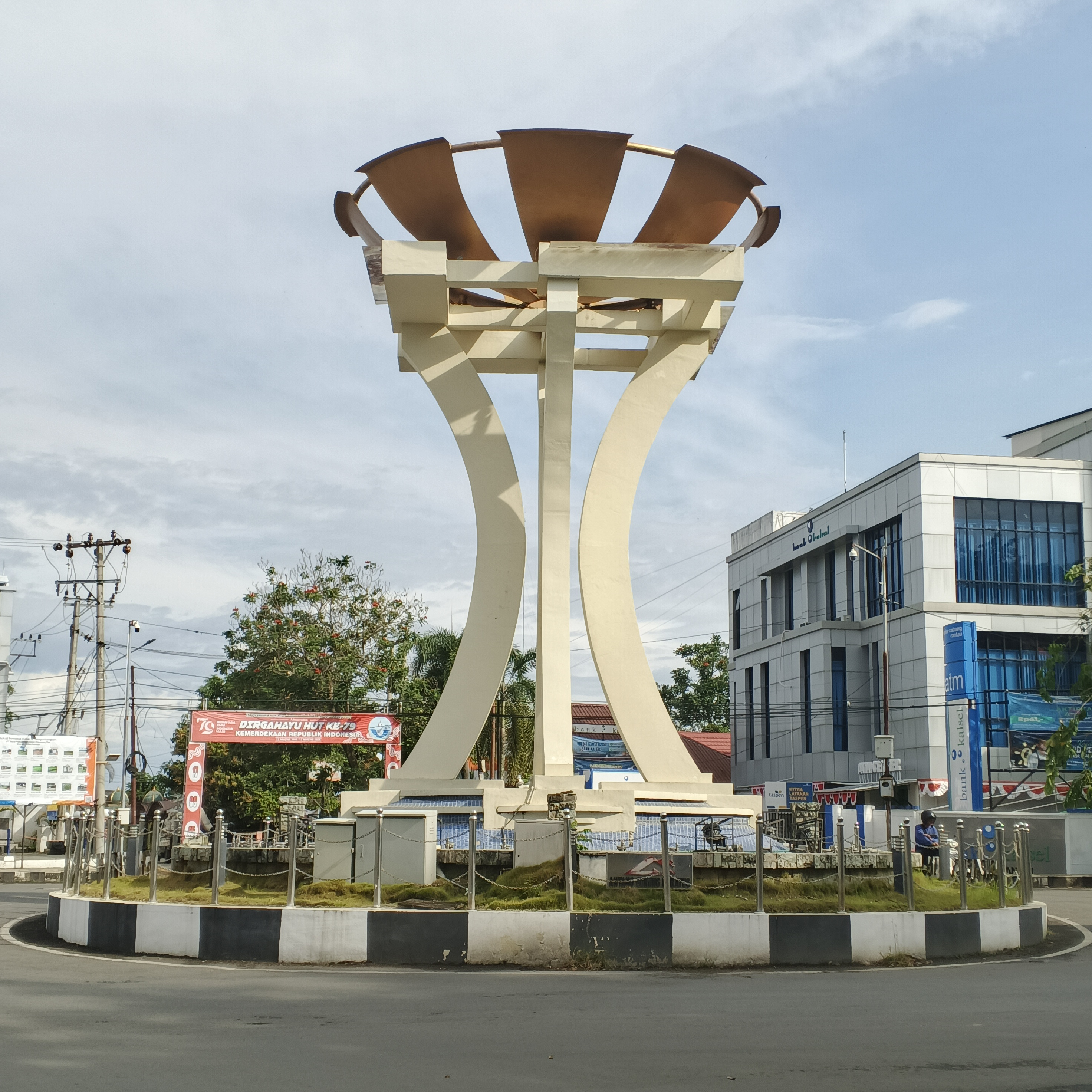
- Sirang Pitu Monument, Rantau

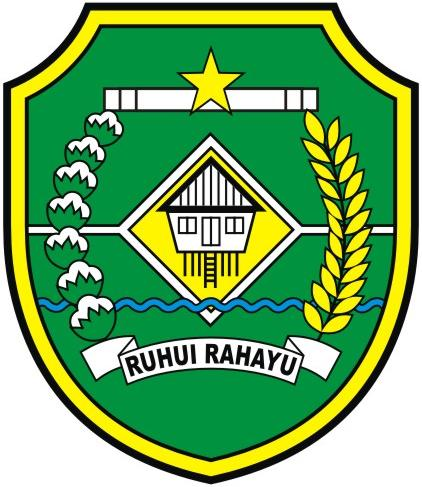
- Coat of arms
- Motto: Ruhui Rahayu (Get Along-peace and Harmony)
- Country: Indonesia
- Province: South Kalimantan
- Capital: Rantau

Government
  - Regent: Yamani
  - Vice Regent: Juanda

Area
  - Total: 2,174.95 km^{2} (839.75 sq mi)

Population (mid 2024 estimate)
  - Total: 202,061
  - Density: 92.9037/km^{2} (240.620/sq mi)
- Time zone: UTC+8 (WITA)
- Area code: +62 517
- Website: tapinkab.go.id

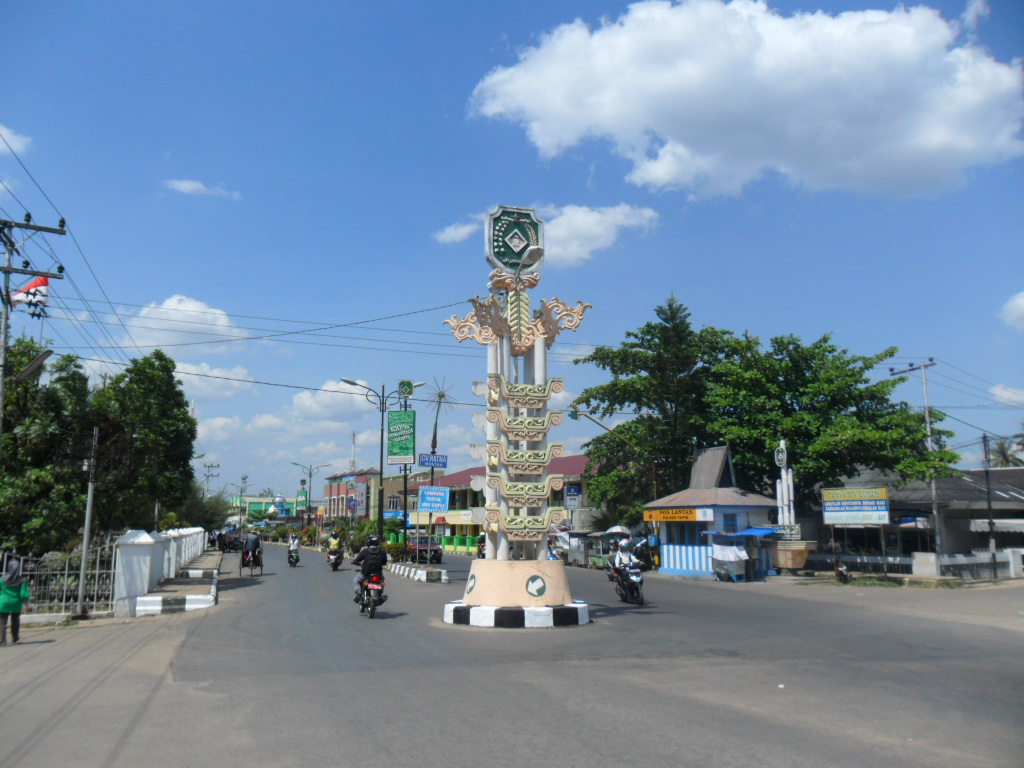
Tapin Regency

Tapin Regency is one of regencies in the Indonesian province of South Kalimantan. The regency was created on 14 July 1965 by splitting off the districts which had until then comprised the southern part of South Hulu Sungai Regency. The regency's motto is "Ruhui Rahayu", and this is also shared by another Indonesian province (East Kalimantan). It covers an area of 2,174.95 km^{2} and had a population of 167,877 at the 2010 Census and 189,475 at the 2020 Census; the official estimate as at mid 2024 was 202,061 (comprising 101,669 males and 100,392 females). The administrative centre of the regency is at the town of Rantau (in Bungur District).

== Administrative districts ==
Tapin Regency is composed of twelve districts (kecamatan), listed below with their present areas and their 2010 and 2020 Census populations, together with the official estimates as at mid 2024. The table includes the locations of the district administrative centres, the number of administrative villages in each district (a total of 126 rural desa and 9 urban kelurahan), and its post code.

Kode Wilayah	Name of District (kecamatan)	Area in km^{2}	Pop'n Census 2010	Pop'n Census 2020	Pop'n Estimate mid 2024	Admin centre	No. of villages	Post code
63.05.01	Binuang	132.39	27,281	31,258	33,296	Binuang	11 ^{(a)}	71183
63.05.12	Hatungun	95.60	8,023	9,256	10,136	Hatungun	8	71184
63.05.02	Tapin Selatan (South Tapin)	153.44	17,990	20,369	21,835	Tambarangan	11 ^{(b)}	71181
63.05.11	Salam Babaris	72.80	11,063	11,858	12,739	Salam Babaris	6	71185
63.05.03	Tapin Tengah (Central Tapin)	309.56	17,635	21,195	22,099	Pematang Karangan Hulu	17	71161
63.05.09	Bungur	91.26	11,625	13,246	14,780	Bungur	12	71153
63.05.08	Piani	200.09	5,361	5,770	6,507	Miawa	8	71191
63.05.10	Lokpaikat	93.89	8,904	11,580	12,715	Lokpaikat	9 ^{(c)}	71154
63.05.04	Tapin Utara (North Tapin)	32.34	23,193	25,396	26,466	Rangda Malingkung	16 ^{(d)}	71111: 71114
63.05.07	Bakarangan	62.57	8,621	10,047	11,163	Bakarangan	12	71152
63.05.05	Candi Laras Selatan (South Candi Laras)	249.61	12,060	12,362	12,825	Baringin	12	71162
63.05.06	Candi Laras Utara (North Candi Laras)	681.40	16,121	17,138	17,500	Margasan Ilir	13	71171
	Totals	2,174.95	167,877	189,475	202,061	Rantau	135	

Notes: (a) including 3 kelurahan - Binuang, Karangan Putih and Raya Belanti. (b) includes one kelurahan - Tambarangan.
(c) includes one kelurahan - Bitahan. (d) includes 4 kelurahan - Kupang, Rangda Malingkung, Rangda Kanan and Rangda Kiwa.

== Climate ==
Rantau, the seat of the regency has a tropical savanna climate (Aw) with moderate rainfall from July to September and heavy to very heavy rainfall from October to June.

Climate data for Rantau
Month	Jan	Feb	Mar	Apr	May	Jun	Jul	Aug	Sep	Oct	Nov	Dec	Year
Mean daily maximum °C (°F)	29.8 (85.6)	30.3 (86.5)	30.6 (87.1)	31.2 (88.2)	31.3 (88.3)	30.9 (87.6)	30.8 (87.4)	31.6 (88.9)	31.9 (89.4)	32.1 (89.8)	31.2 (88.2)	30.3 (86.5)	31.0 (87.8)
Daily mean °C (°F)	26.3 (79.3)	26.6 (79.9)	26.8 (80.2)	27.2 (81.0)	27.3 (81.1)	26.7 (80.1)	26.3 (79.3)	26.8 (80.2)	27.0 (80.6)	27.4 (81.3)	27.1 (80.8)	26.6 (79.9)	26.8 (80.3)
Mean daily minimum °C (°F)	22.8 (73.0)	22.9 (73.2)	23.0 (73.4)	23.2 (73.8)	23.3 (73.9)	22.5 (72.5)	21.9 (71.4)	22.0 (71.6)	22.2 (72.0)	22.7 (72.9)	23.0 (73.4)	23.0 (73.4)	22.7 (72.9)
Average rainfall mm (inches)	347 (13.7)	318 (12.5)	341 (13.4)	250 (9.8)	198 (7.8)	129 (5.1)	121 (4.8)	113 (4.4)	109 (4.3)	189 (7.4)	269 (10.6)	351 (13.8)	2,735 (107.6)
Source: Climate-Data.org
