= South Hulu Sungai Regency =

Regency in South Kalimantan, Indonesia

South Hulu Sungai Regency Kabupaten Hulu Sungai Selatan
- Regency

Other transcription(s)
  - Jawi: كابوڤاتين هولو سوڠاي سلتن
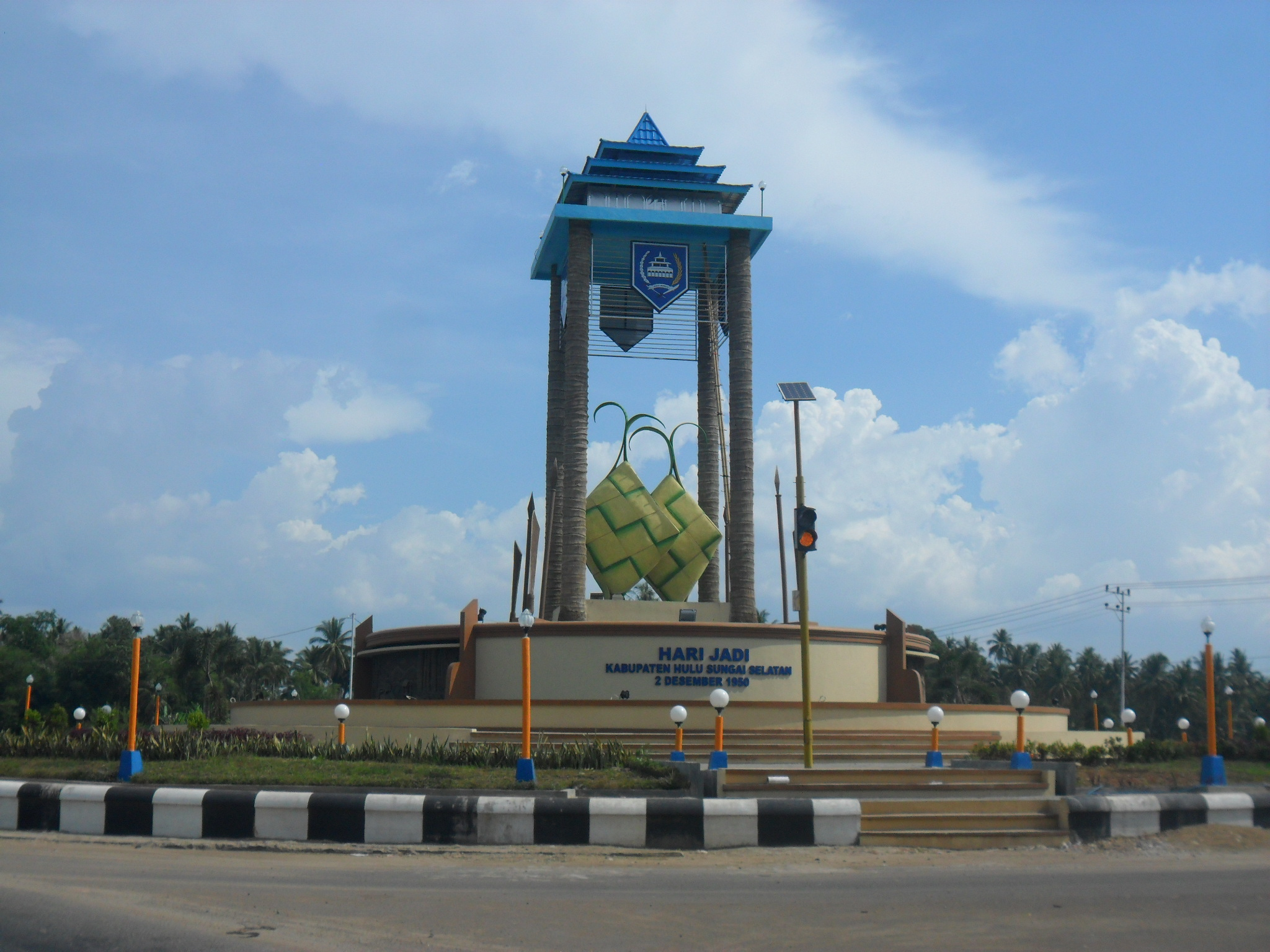
- Hamalau Roundabout

- Coat of arms
- Motto: Rakat Mufakat (Unity in Social Life with Deliberation)

- Location within Kalimantan
- Coordinates: 2°47′S 115°16′E
- Country: Indonesia
- Province: South Kalimantan
- Capital: Kandangan
- Established: 1959

Government
  - Regent: Syafrudin Noor
  - Vice Regent: Suriani

Area
  - Total: 1,804.94 km^{2} (696.89 sq mi)

Population (mid 2024 estimate)
  - Total: 238,413
  - Density: 132.089/km^{2} (342.109/sq mi)
- Time zone: UTC+8 (WITA)
- Area code: +62 517
- Website: hulusungaiselatankab.go.id

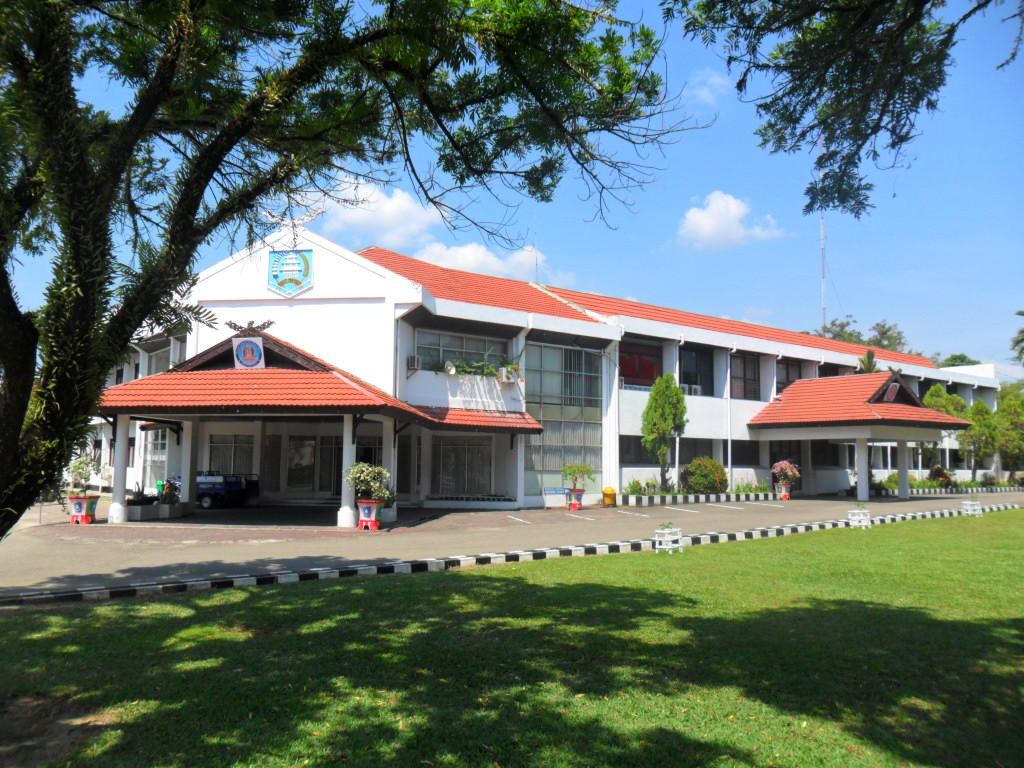
South Hulu Sungai Regency government office

South Hulu Sungai Regency (kabupaten Hulu Sungai Selatan) is one of the regencies (kabupaten) in South Kalimantan province, Indonesia. It had an area of 1,804.94 km^{2}, and a population of 212,485 at the 2010 Census and 228,006 at the 2020 Census; the official estimate as at mid 2024 was 238,413 (comprising 119,897 males and 118,516 females). The capital of the regency is the town of Kandangan, which is famous for its culinary ketupat Kandangan.

== Administrative districts ==
Originally at Indonesia's independence there was a single Hulu Sungai Regency (the regency was named for the upper reaches of the Barito River), but on 26 June 1959 this was divided into three new regencies covering South Hulu Sungai, Central Hulu Sungai and North Hulu Sungai respectively, and on 14 July 1965 part of the new South Hulu Sungai Regency was split off to create a separate Tapin Regency. The remaining South Hulu Sungai Regency is divided into eleven districts (kecamatan), tabulated below with their areas and their populations at the 2010 Census and 2020 Census, together with the official estimates as at mid 2024. The table includes the locations of the district administrative centres, the number of administrative villages in each district (a total of 144 rural desa and 4 urban kelurahan - the latter all in Kandangan District), and its post code.

Kode Wilayah	Name of District (kecamatan)	Area in km^{2}	Pop'n Census 2010	Pop'n Census 2020	Pop'n Estimate mid 2024	Admin centre	No. of villages	Post code
63.06.02	Padang Batung	203.93	19,497	21,424	22,587	Padang Batung	17	71281
63.06.10	Loksado	338.89	8,173	8,454	8,931	Loksado	11	71282
63.06.03	Telaga Langsat	58.08	8,950	10,199	10,618	Mandala	11	71292
63.06.04	Angkinang	58.40	16,730	18,561	19,507	Angkinang Selatan	11	71291
63.06.05	Kandangan	106.71	46,294	48,866	50,691	Kandangan Kota	18 ^{(a)}	71211 -71217
63.06.01	Sungai Raya	80.96	16,105	18,047	18,502	Sungai Raya	18	71271
63.06.06	Simpur	82.35	13,872	15,222	15,793	Simpur	11	71261
63.06.09	Kalumpang	135.07	6,002	6,522	6,656	Kalumpang	9	71262
63.06.07	Daha Selatan (South Daha)	322.82	39,348	40,802	43,061	Bayanan	16	71251
63.06.11	Daha Barat (West Daha)	149.62	7,230	7,974	8,213	Bajayau	7	71252
63.06.08	Daha Utara (North Daha)	268.11	30,284	31,935	33,854	Tambak Bitin	19	71253
	Totals	1,804.94	212,485	228,006	238,413	Kandangan	148	

Notes: (a) includes 4 kelurahan - Jambu Hilir, Kandangan Barat, Kandangan Kota and Kandangan Utara.
