= A. A. Hamidhan =

Indonesian freedom fighter and journalist

- A. A. Hamidhan and wife Siti Aisyah
- Born: Anang Abdul Hamidhan; 25 February 1909; Rantau, Tapin, South Kalimantan
- Died: 21 August 1997 (aged 88); Banjarmasin, South Kalimantan, Indonesia
- Occupation: Journalist
- Known for: Member of the PPKI

A. A. Hamidhan (25 February 1909 – 21 August 1997), is the popular name of Anang Abdul Hamidhan, an Indonesian freedom fighter and journalist from South Kalimantan. He established the daily Soeara Kalimantan in 1930. It was he who brought news of Indonesia's unilateral declaration of independence to Borneo.

== Early life ==
Hamidhan was born in Rantau, Tapin, South Kalimantan on 25 February 1909. He studied in a Europeese Lagere School in Samarinda before going to Genrum MULO in Batavia (modern day Jakarta). Formal education was rare at the time for natives who were not of noble descent, especially in Borneo.

== Career ==
=== Before independence ===
By 1927 Hamidhan had begun working in journalism, joining the editorial board of the newspaper Perasaan Kita in Samarinda; he also joined the board of Bintang Timoer in Batavia. By 1929 he was heading Bendahara Borneo; he would lead several further newspapers in the 1930s and 1940s, including Soeara Kalimantan (1930s), Kalimantan Raya (1942), and Borneo Shimbun (1945).

Soeara Kalimantan, which Hamidhan established on 23 March 1930, was located in Banjarmasin; several other native journalists followed his lead by establishing their own publications. However, Hamidhan was imprisoned several times for his writings opposing the Dutch colonial government; this included two months in Cipinang in 1930, six weeks in Banjarmasin in 1932, and a further six months in Banjarmasin in 1936.

During the Japanese occupation, Soera Kalimantan's offices were destroyed during a Japanese offensive on Banjarmasin in February 1942. On 5 March Hamidhan began publishing the daily Kalimantan Raya. Kalimantan Raya was established on orders from the Japanese, and by May control had shifted to Japanese journalists from Asahi Shimbun and renamed Borneo Simboen. Hamidhan remained as an editor and was under intense pressure from the occupation forces, receiving several warnings for his writings.

=== Post-independence ===
In 1945 Hamidhan was chosen by the Japanese as a representative of South Borneo at the Preparatory Committee for Indonesian Independence (Panitia Persiapan Kemerdekaan Indonesia, or PPKI) in Jakarta (renamed during the occupation). Before leaving, he spoke with local figures regarding their hopes and aspirations for an independent nation. When Indonesia proclaimed its independence on 17 August 1945, Hamidhan was one of the witnesses. He later wrote Sekitar Mukaddimah UUD 1945: Untuk Memperlengkap Kebenaran Sejarah (Regarding the Constitution of 1945: To Complete History's Recordings), which dealt with his experiences around the period and decried claims that there was conflict over parts of the constitution relating to God's role in the country.

On 18 August the PPKI had its first meeting, where President Sukarno indicated nine members (Note: These included himself, Oto Iskandar di Nata, Soebardjo, Sajuti Melik, Iwa Kusumasumantri, Wiranatakusumah, Dr. Amir, Sutardjo Kartohadikusumo, Dr. Ratulangi, and I Gusti Ketut Pudja.) as a subcommittee tasked with deciding urgent matters regarding the nascent country's policing, defence, subdivision, and economy. The following day Oto Iskandar di Nata held a meeting where he offered governorship of Borneo to Hamidhan, an offer the latter refused. Hamidhan instead suggested Pangeran Mohammad Noor, who was in Java at the time and later became the government's selection.

With A.A. Rivai, his younger brother on 24 August Hamidhan went to Borneo to bring news of Indonesia's independence. This he published in Borneo Shimbun, including the entirety of the proclamation, the constitution, and an announcement of Pangeran Muhammad Noor's selection as governor. He also helped establish branches of the National Party of Indonesia, People's Security Body, and governing boards.

After the Dutch–Indonesian Round Table Conference in 1949 Hamidhan renamed Soeara Kalimantan as Indonesia Merdeka. He sold the publication in 1961, disheartened by the increasing lack of press freedom. His nephew Fachrudin Mohani then offered him two hotels to manage, Hotel Banyuwangi (Banyuwangi) and Hotel Wisma Andhika (Surabaya), a job offer which Hamidhan accepted. He continued this work, visiting Borneo ever few months, until 1975.

== Personal life ==
Hamidhan was married to Siti Aisyah, with whom he had seven children and eleven grandchildren. A biography on him, entitled H.A.A. Hamidhan: Pejuang dan Perintis Pers di Kalimantan (H.A.A. Hamidhan: Fighter and Press Leader in Kalimantan) was written in 1987.
