= Kandangan =

- Town
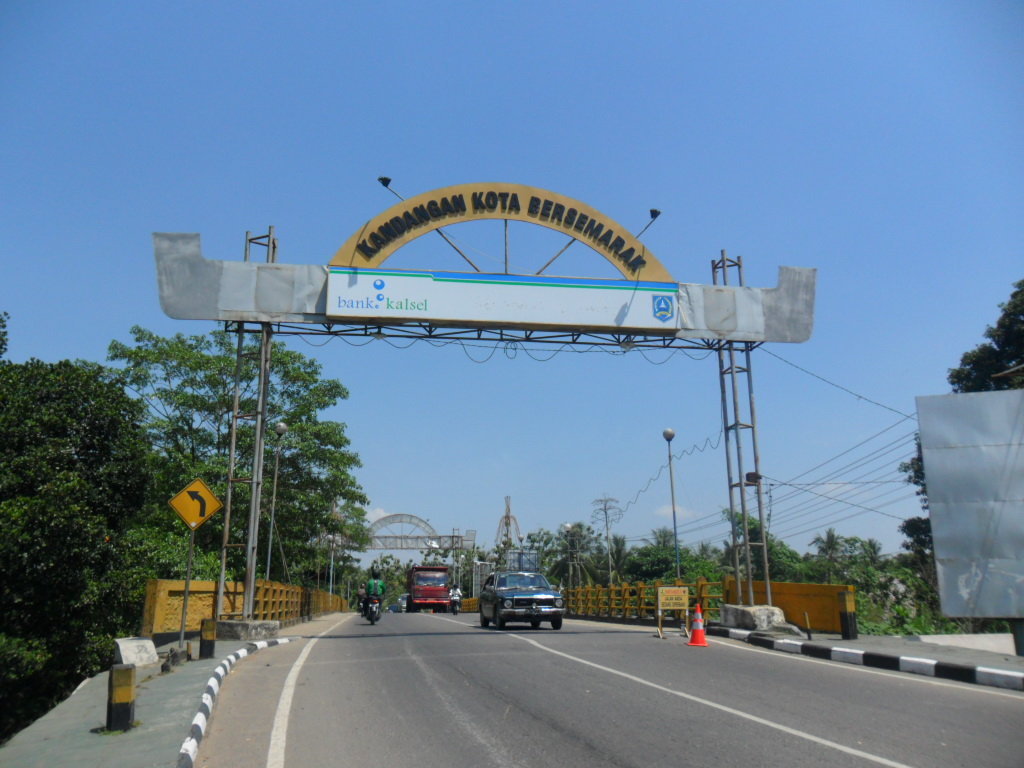
- District gate of Kandangan

- Location within Kalimantan
- Coordinates: 2°47′S 115°16′E
- Country: Indonesia
- Province: South Kalimantan
- Regency: South Hulu Sungai

Area
  - Total: 106.71 km^{2} (41.20 sq mi)

Population (mid 2024 estimate)
  - Total: 50,691
  - Density: 475.04/km^{2} (1,230.3/sq mi)
- Time zone: UTC+8 (WITA)
- Area code: +62 517

Kandangan is an administrative district (kecamatan) and a town which serves as the regency seat of South Hulu Sungai Regency in South Kalimantan province. The district covers an area of 106.71 square kilometres (41.20 sq mi). According to the mid 2024 official estimates, the population of the district was 50,691 people spread across four urban kelurahan and fourteen rural villages (desa).

== History ==
=== Ibnu Hadjar Insurgency ===
Around the end of October and early November 1950, Kandangan was invaded three times by KjRT forces led by Ibnu Hadjar in response to the government's military operations to quell the insurgency. On 12 December 1953, KjRT attacked Kandangan from four directions.

== Geography ==
The district borders Angkinang District of Central Hulu Sungai Regency in the north and east, Sungai Raya District in the south, and South Daha District in the west.

=== Climate ===
Kandangan has a tropical savanna climate (Aw) with moderate rainfall in August and September and heavy rainfall in the remaining months.

Climate data for Kandangan
Month	Jan	Feb	Mar	Apr	May	Jun	Jul	Aug	Sep	Oct	Nov	Dec	Year
Mean daily maximum °C (°F)	29.7 (85.5)	30.3 (86.5)	30.5 (86.9)	31.0 (87.8)	31.1 (88.0)	30.7 (87.3)	30.7 (87.3)	31.3 (88.3)	31.7 (89.1)	31.9 (89.4)	31.1 (88.0)	30.2 (86.4)	30.9 (87.5)
Daily mean °C (°F)	26.2 (79.2)	26.6 (79.9)	26.7 (80.1)	27.1 (80.8)	27.1 (80.8)	26.6 (79.9)	26.3 (79.3)	26.6 (79.9)	26.9 (80.4)	27.3 (81.1)	27.0 (80.6)	26.5 (79.7)	26.7 (80.1)
Mean daily minimum °C (°F)	22.7 (72.9)	22.9 (73.2)	23.0 (73.4)	23.2 (73.8)	23.2 (73.8)	22.5 (72.5)	22.0 (71.6)	22.0 (71.6)	22.2 (72.0)	22.7 (72.9)	22.9 (73.2)	22.9 (73.2)	22.7 (72.8)
Average rainfall mm (inches)	306 (12.0)	301 (11.9)	289 (11.4)	229 (9.0)	193 (7.6)	127 (5.0)	128 (5.0)	107 (4.2)	108 (4.3)	157 (6.2)	247 (9.7)	325 (12.8)	2,517 (99.1)
Source: Climate-Data.org

== Demographics ==
According to Statistics Indonesia, the official population estimate of the district as at mid 2022 was 49,604. This consisted of 24,598 males and 25,006 females. Gender ratio as of 2019 was there are 98 males for every 100 females. The vast majority of the district population is Muslim, with a figure of 99.64% on 2019. However, there are small minorities such as Hindus, Buddhists, and Christians. Kandangan Kota is the most dense kelurahan with a density of 3,830 per square kilometre, while the least dense village was Bangkau village with a figure of 93 per square kilometre.

== Economy ==
Agriculture & plantation is an important part of the district's economy, as there were 4,482 hectares of irrigated paddy fields in the district. On 2018, the district produced 18,620 tons from paddy fields and 287 tons of cassava. Other than that, the district also produces 4,430 tons of chili, 209 tons of citrus fruit, and 1,078 tons of coconut. Livestock population in the district consisted of cows with population of 561, goats with population of 738, and chicken with population of 85,614. Fish catch in the district was 2,017 tons while farmed fish was 176 tons. Other productions include spinach, tomato, cucumber, and banana.

There are eight hotels and 154 registered restaurants in the district as of 2019. Other than that, there are also 57 registered cooperatives, seven state-owned bank branches, two private bank branches, and one BPR (People's Credit Bank).

== Governance ==
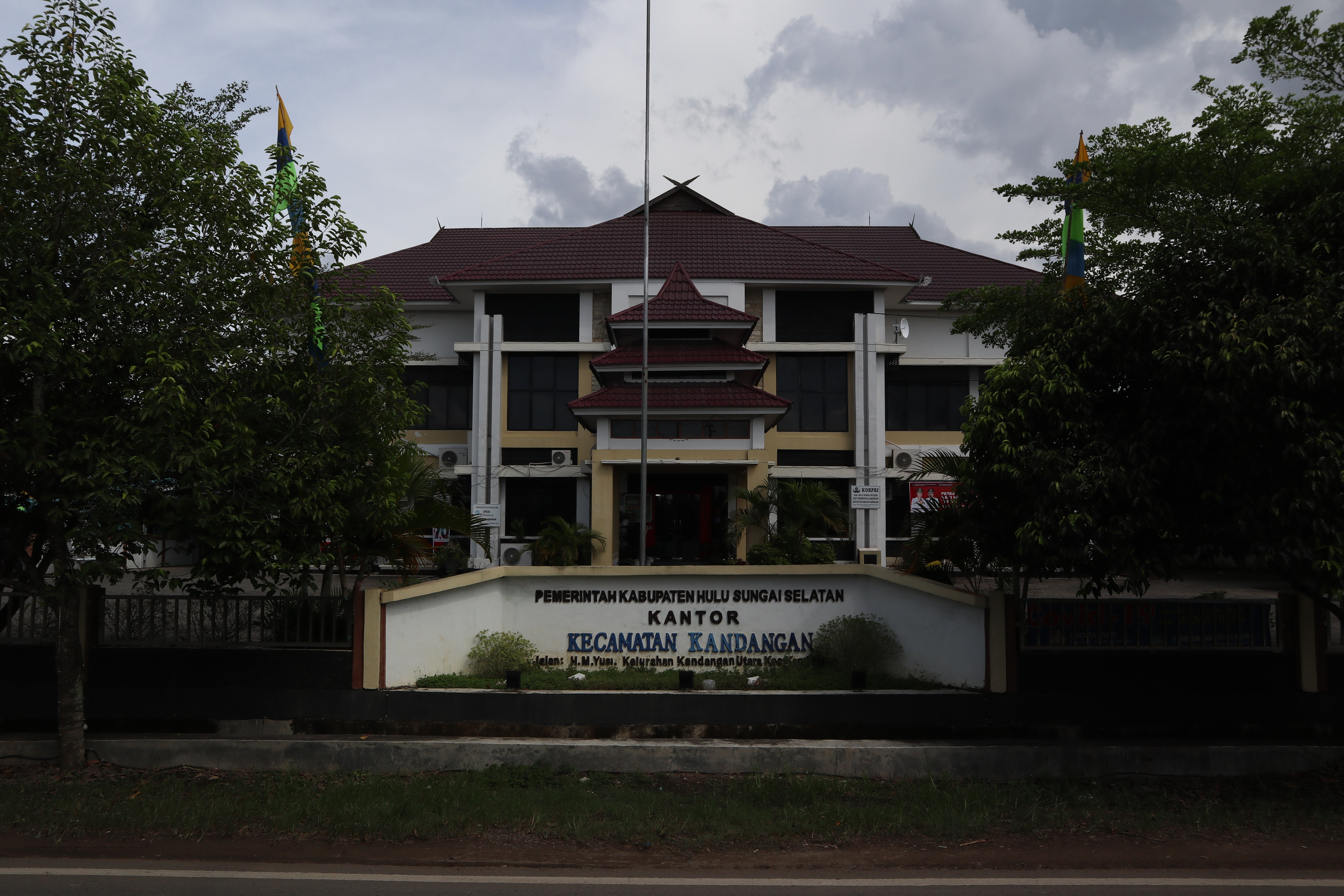
Kandangan district office building

As a district, it is a third-level administrative region below that of a regency. A district head (camat) is appointed directly by the regent with recommendation from the regency secretary. Kandangan itself has no local administrative body. It is divided into 18 villages, consisting of 14 rural villages (desa) and 4 urban villages (kelurahan), differences between the two are merely in name, with that of desa being more rural and less populated than kelurahan; at the administrative level, they both are equal subdivisions of the district. Below is a list of the villages, with their postcodes.

=== Urban villages (Kelurahan) ===
- Jambu Hilir (71214)
- Kandangam Barat (West Kandangan) (71213)
- Kandangan Kota (Kandangan Town) (71211)
- Kandangan Utara (North Kandangan) (71214)

=== Villages (Desa) ===
- Amawang Kanan (71213)
- Amawang Kiri (71213)
- Amawang Kiri Muka (71213)
- Baluti (71217)
- Bangkau (71217)
- Bariang (71213)
- Gambah Dalam (71215)
- Gambah Dalam Barat (West Gambah Dalam) (71215)
- Gambah Luar (71216)
- Gambah Luar Muka (71216)
- Lungau (71213)
- Sungai Kupang (71217)
- Sungai Paring (71213)
- Tibung Raya (71214)

At the regency level, the district is part of South Hulu Sungai's 1st electoral district together with Sungai Raya, Simpur, and Kalumpang Districts, and together they send 11 out of 30 representatives to the regency's parliament. The last election was in 2024.

== Infrastructure ==
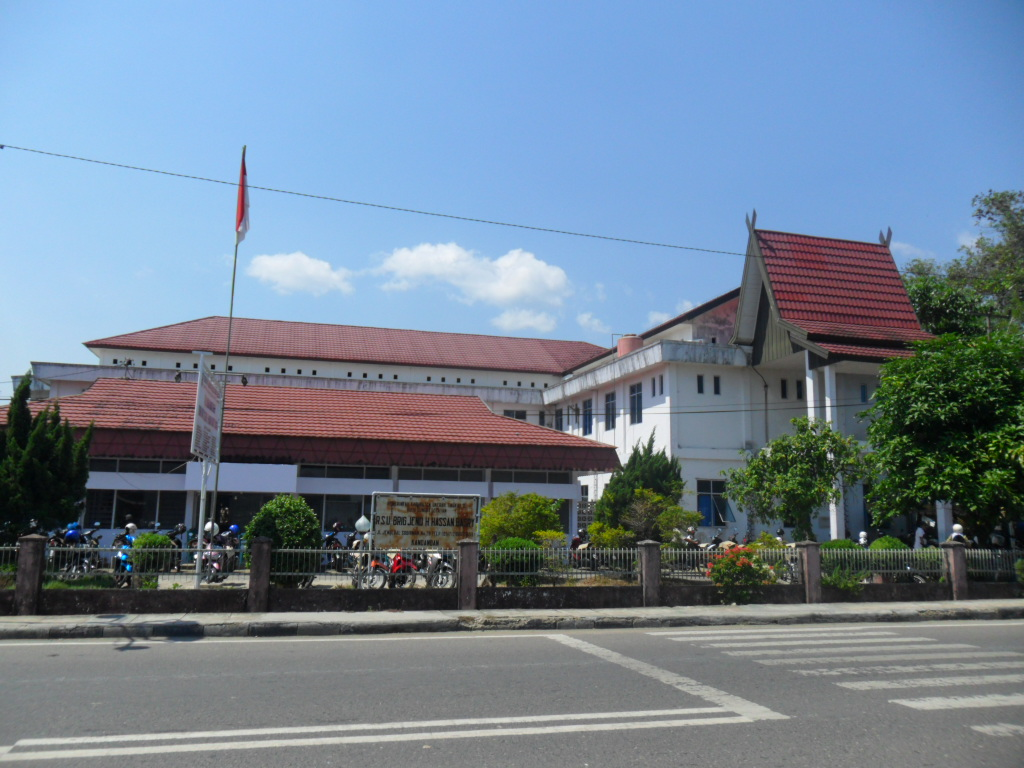
Hasan Basry Regional Hospital, one of the main public hospital in the district

There are 50 elementary schools, 13 junior high schools, 5 senior high schools, and 2 vocational high schools in the district. There is only one higher education institution in the district, Darul Umum Islamic College. For healthcare, the district has two hospitals (one of them is a maternity hospital), ten puskesmas, and 14 healthcare centers. In addition, there are 12 registered pharmacies. There are exactly 158 mosques and one church in the district. All 18 villages within the district have access to electricity and the main road has adequate street lamp as of 2019. All electricity is supplied and subsidized by Perusahaan Listrik Negara, state-owned electric company.

The total length of roads in the district is 131.27 kilometres, all of which have been paved with asphalt and are in general in good condition, according to Statistics Indonesia on 2019. There are 28 operational base transceiver stations in the district as of 2019, and the district has access to 4G as of 2018.
