= Madmuin Hasibuan =

Indonesian politician and military officer (1922 – 1961)

Major Madmuin Hasibuan

Speaker of Provisional Bekasi Regency Regional House of Representatives
- In office 10 November 1950 – 2 November 1956
- Preceded by: Office established
- Succeeded by: Hussein Kamaly

Personal details
- Born: 1922 Huta Padang, Dutch East Indies
- Died: 1961 (aged 39–40) Bekasi, West Java, Indonesia
- Party: Masyumi
- Spouse: Hasanah (?–1955)
- Occupation: Politician

Military service
- Allegiance: Indonesia
- Branch/service: Indonesian Navy
- Years of service: 1945–1949
- Rank: Major
- Battles/wars: Indonesian National Revolution: Burning of Bekasi; Operation Product

Major Madmuin Hasibuan, often written Matmuin Hasibuan and known as M. Hasibuan; (1922–1961), was an Indonesian politician and military officer.

== Biography ==
=== Early life ===
Born in Huta Padang in 1922, Hasibuan was the son of H. Muhammad Yunus and Dorima Siregar. He was the second of six siblings. His father was a religious figure. During his teenage years, Hasibuan's father caught him breaking fast during the month of Ramadan; his father punished him by denying him food for three days (though his mother took pity on him, secretly providing him with food for the period). As a teenager, during the Japanese occupation, he worked at the Port of Belawan.

He later worked as a foreman at the Port of Tanjung Priok. He also attended the proclamation of independence at Jalan Pegangsaan Timur No. 56.

=== Indonesian National Revolution (1945–1949) ===
After Moeffreni Moe’min established the Jakarta People's Security Agency (BKR) on August 27, 1945, Hasibuan, along with Eddy Martadinata, was appointed as the sector commander for North Jakarta because he was familiar with the Tanjung Priok Port area. When the central Naval People's Security Agency was established on 10 September 1945, the North Jakarta BKR, led by Hasibuan and Martadinata, merged into the Naval BKR.

On 6 October 1945, a day after the Naval BKR was transformed into the Naval People's Security Army (TKR), Hasibuan and his troops attacked Netherlands Indies Civil Administration (NICA) and Allied forces at the Kali Kresek Bridge and they were supported by reinforcements from northern Jakarta and Bekasi. The battle was intense. The following day, Hasibuan and his troops retreated to Marunda, Ujungmalang, Kampung Muara, and Babelan after being attacked by Allied P-40 Warhawk aircraft.

Upon arriving in Babelan, Hasibuan allied with the Hizbullah Militia led by Noer Ali. He also led a military unit composed mainly of Batak that was stationed around the Citarum River delta. He established his headquarters in Kampung Muara Babakan.

On 29 November 1945, the Naval TKR troops led by Hasibuan, along with the TKR Battalion V Bekasi and the Hizbullah Militia led by Noer Ali, engaged in a fierce battle against NICA in Kampung Sasak Kapuk. Later, on 5 December 1945, he and the Wedana of Tanjung Priok, Hindun Witawinangun, were captured by NICA and imprisoned in Polonia Camp.

When Hasibuan was imprisoned in Polonia Camp, NICA tortured him, resulting in injuries. He was later released on 15 December 1945, after pressure from his comrades who threatened not to vacate Tanjung Priok unless NICA freed Hasibuan. After his release, Hasibuan relocated his headquarters to Karang Congkok.

Hasibuan's troops were attacked by a Dutch ship in Ujung Karawang on 22 August 1946, forcing him into a more difficult position. By May 1947, he was further pushed back to Karawang and relocated his headquarters to Rengasdengklok. Along with Hizbullah figures, he established the Plebesit Movement in Bekasi.

On 21 July 1947, the Dutch launched Operation Product. At that time, Hasibuan was in Rengasdengklok and tried to repel the Dutch forces. However, he realised that his troops would not have been able to defeat these forces, so he chose to flee to Tegal, where there was an ALRI (Indonesian Navy) base.

=== Political career ===
After the transfer of sovereignty on December 27, 1949, Hasibuan decided to retire from the military and chose to pursue a career in politics. In January 1950, he became a member of the People's Mandate Committee of Bekasi, which demanded the separation of Bekasi from the Jakarta Federal District and the renaming of Jatinegara Regency to Bekasi.

As part of the People's Mandate Committee of Bekasi, Hasibuan was appointed as a liaison to the United States of Indonesia government. He was also involved in organizing a massive rally. However, he and Noer Ali were arrested by Daan Jahja (Military Governor of Jakarta) for holding the rally without permission. Later, he and Ali explained that their actions were actually in support of the fight for a united nation. As a result, Jahja released them, and Hasibuan tried to propose the issue to the House of Representatives of the United States of Indonesia.

After the dissolution of the Pasundan State in February 1950, Hasibuan joined the Masyumi Party. He was then appointed as the chairman of the Bekasi Regency People's Representative Council (DPRDS) after it was established on November 10, 1950. The establishment of the DPRDS became a threat to the Regent of Bekasi, Suhandan Umar, who accused Hasibuan of monopolizing swamp land and ponds in Bekasi.

In 1955, Hasibuan served as the secretary of the Masyumi Party branch in Bekasi and as a member of the Committee for the Distribution of State Rice Fields in Babelan District. He also defended Noer Ali when Ali was accused by the Communist Party of Indonesia of land grabbing. In 1956, he resigned from his position as Speaker of the Provisional Bekasi Regency House of Representatives and was replaced by Husein Kamaly.

== Death ==
Hasibuan died in 1961, caused by lung disease. He was buried next to his wife, in the cemetery behind Al-Barakah Grand Mosque in Bekasi.

In 2021, a history enthusiast Beny Rusmawan discovered Hasibuan's grave in a neglected condition. Upon finding the grave in such a worrying state, the Bekasi City Government renovated Hasibuan's grave in December 2022, with the renovation taking one month.

== Personal life ==
Hasibuan married Hasanah. She died in 1955.

== Awards ==
Hasibuan's name was used for a street and a town square in Bekasi City. On 10 September 2021, the Indonesian Navy (TNI-AL) honored Hasibuan with an award.
