= Operation Pagar Betis =

1949-1962 Indonesian Military Operations

- Part of Darul Islam rebellion
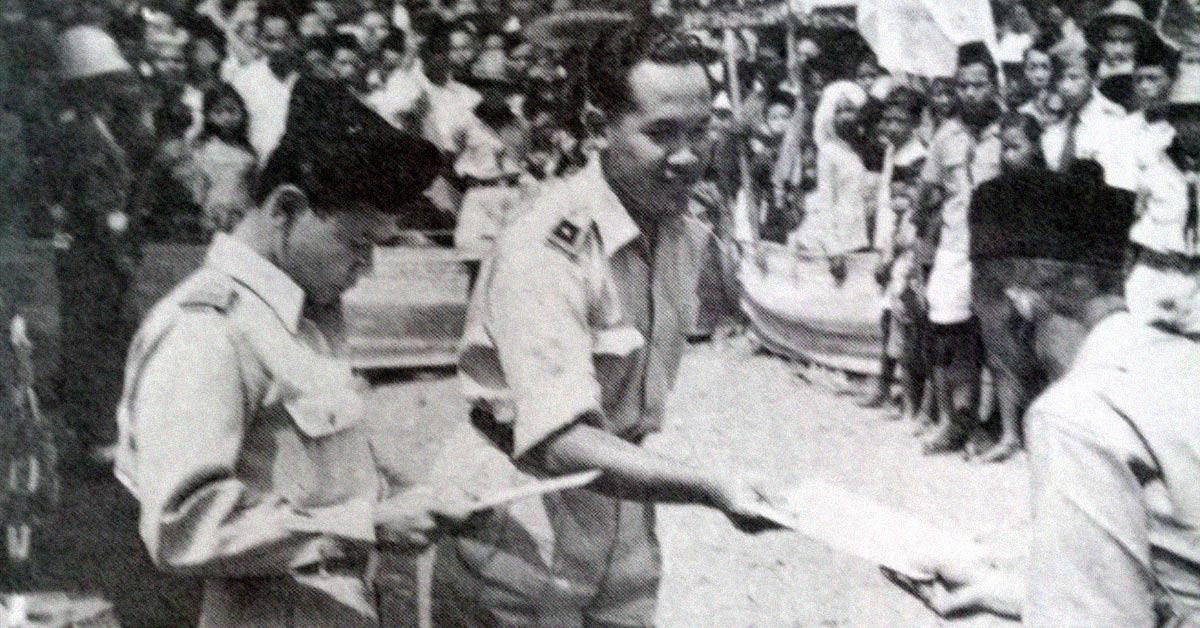
- Indonesian forces with other civilians
Date	7 August 1949 - 4 June 1962
Location	West Java, Indonesia
Result	Indonesian government victory; Government forces successfully blockade Darul Islam main base; The surrender of Darul Islam forces led by Kartosoewirjo
Territorial changes	All territories controlled by Darul Islam was recaptured by Indonesian government

Belligerents
Indonesia	Islamic State of Indonesia

Commanders and leaders
(Indonesia) Abdul Haris Nasution	Kartosoewirjo (surrendered)

Units involved
Indonesian Army; Siliwangi Division	Unknown

Strength
Thousand Soldiers	Thousand Soldiers

Casualties and losses
Light	Heavy Casualties

The Operation Pagar Betis (Indonesian:Operasi Pagar Betis) was a counter-insurgent operation conducted by the Indonesian Army to blockade the Darul Islam main base to reduce their guerilla movement and eliminate their supplies lines. This operation was a success and effectively ended the rebellion with the surrender of Darul Islam forces by Kartosoewirjo.

== Background ==
In 1949 Kartosoewirjo started the armed rebellion known as Darul Islam rebellion. However the government responded with counter-insurgency operations.

The Indonesian government launched the operations called "Operasi Pagar Betis". The plan of this operation was to infiltrate the enemy headquarters and to blockade and destroy it. These tactics were known as pagar betis (the plan and tactics by Nasution), however the mastermind and commander of this operations was Abdul Haris Nasution.

== Operations ==
Nasution realized that his forces need the power and some supports from civilians, and he offered to the civilians, who were not interested in helping his forces in this operation, services in their region, such as farming or patrolling their houses from robbery or Darul Islam rebels.

After this action, the civilians started to help government forces and many of them who participated patrolled many places was suspected as Darul Islam region. They succeeded in capturing and killing many Darul Islam forces and also found some information about the rebels main base.

Darul Islam was blockaded by the Indonesian government and many of their supplies were cut off, plenty of movement was closed, and they lost some support from civilians. Many of their guerilla movements were defeated. Kartosoewirjo, the leader of Darul Islam, decided to surrender, which marked the end of the rebellion.

== Aftermath ==
After this operations the rebellion finally ended and many Darul Islam forces were captured or killed during this operation. This operation also showed that civilians support was more important to suppress rebellion, and also the civilians participated on this operations and helping the government forces to patrol and spying the guerilla movement of darul islam.

This operation was successful and is known as the first government-civilians operation in Indonesia to effectively suppressed the rebellion and captured the leader of the darul islam Kartosoewirjo after the government forces launched may blockades action on the territory of darul islam. And however many civilians were killed and many houses was burned by darul islam forces

However after Kartosoewirjo was captured by Siliwangi forces in Garut he was put on trial by Military Constitution for 3 days and the Constitution decided to give him death punishment and sent him to Thousand Islands (Indonesia), Jakarta. After that he was sent to Ubi Island and where on 5 September 1962 he was executed.
