= Amir Fatah =

Indonesian Islamist

Amir Fatah Widjajakusuma
- Born: Suhario c. 1923; Kroya, Cilacap
- Military career
- Allegiance: Indonesia; Darul Islam
- Service years: 1945–1949, 1949–1950
- Rank: Commandant
- Units: Hisbullah; Syarif Hidayat Wijayakusuma Battalion
- Conflicts: Indonesian National Revolution; Darul Islam Rebellion

Amir Fatah Widjajakusuma (born Suhario; c. 1923) was a commandant of DI/TII Central Java from 1949 to 1950.

== Early life ==
Suhario was born around 1923 in Kroya, Cilacap. He studied in four different Islamic boarding schools, which were Tebuireng, Termas, Benda, and Jampes. In the Dutch era, he joined Jong Islamieten Bond and Ansor Youth Movement. Under the Japanese occupation, he joined an underground resistance movement in Jakarta.

== Indonesia National Revolution ==
Suhario became Hisbullah Commandant in Sidoarjo dan Mojokerto region and field leader of Hisbullah during Battle of Surabaya. In 1946, Sudirman sent Suhario to West Java to ensure West Java loyalty to Indonesia.

Suhario had a close relationship with Kartosoewirjo. In February 1947, his forces escorted Kartosoewirjo to Malang to attend the plenary session of Central Indonesian National Committee. In Malang, he became Chief of Staff of the August 17th Division. Also, he participated in politics by joining Masyumi and became a member of the party's committee.

In mid-August 1948, Suhario, with his three Hisbullah companies, moved to the Brebes-Tegal area to wage a guerilla war against the Dutch. He changed his name to Amir Fatah Widajakusuma.

In September 1948, Fatah tried to meet Kartosoewirjo in West Java to convince him not to proclaim an islamic state and to remain loyal to Indonesia. In the middle of the journey, Fatah met Kartosoewirjo's envoy, Kamran Cakrabuana. From a meeting with Kamran, Fatah changed his mind from opposing Kartosoewirjo's Islamic state conception to supporting it. He later decided not to meet Kartosoewirjo due to the challenging terrain and returned to Tegal-Brebes instead. As he arrived in the Brebes-Tegal area, Fatah founded Majels Islam and formed a battalion loyal to Darul Islam, Syarif Hidayat Wijayakusuma Battalion, in which he was appointed as the commandant. Nevertheless, Fatah remained loyal to the Republican Government.

On 19 December 1948, the Dutch launched Operation Kraai and TNI units, which were forced to move to the Republican control area due to the Renville Agreement, retreated to their respective origin to wage guerrilla against Dutch and formed military government. In Brebes-Tegal, TNI units returnee formed a military government named Sub Wehkreise Slamet III (SWKS III). Fatah was appointed as the chief security coordinator of SWKS III.

== Darul Islam rebellion ==
As time went on, the relations between Fatah with SWKS III deteriorated. He felt threatened by the presence of the TNI military government in the Brebes-Tegal area because it had close relations with the left-wing group. Moreover, the government did not appreciate Fatah's effort to fight against the Dutch and tried to disarm Fatah's forces. Hence, on 28 April 1949, Amir Fatah proclaimed the establishment of the Islamic State of Indonesia in Pengarasan, Brebes.

Fatah launched the first attack against TNI on 5 May 1949 in Bentarsari, Brebes, and occupied the village for two days. Under his leadership, DI/TII launched many attacks on police and TNI posts in Brebes and Tegal Regency and managed to occupy Brebes on early January 1950 for a short time. Likewise, he was accused as a mastermind of terrors in some villages in Brebes-Tegal area. In November 1950, DI/TII underwent reorganization by disbanding Syarif Hidayat Wijayakusuma Battalion and creating a new division, Division III/Syarif Hidayat.

In November 1950, Mohammad Natsir offered Fatah to surrender. He accepted it because he was dismayed with the decision of DI/TII reorganization in which he only got the position of Brigade Commandant on Division III/Syarif Hidayat, not the head of division staff as he wished. However, he had to go to West Java to meet Kartosoewirjo about the surrender offer.

On 30 November 1950, Fatah traveled to West Java with his 150 soldiers. On his way to West Java, he faced numerous battles with TNI. Eventually, Amir Fatah and his forces surrendered to TNI in Calingcing, Tasikmalaya, on 20 December 1950. Two days later, he was arrested by TNI in Cisayong, Tasikmalaya.

== Post Darul Islam rebellion ==
Fatah was imprisoned in Nusa Kambangan and later transferred to an unknown prison in West Java.

After Fatah was released from prison, he went abroad to several countries in America and Europe. In 1968, he decided to settle in South Korea. As of 1976, he was a member of the mosque committee in Seoul and worked as a local staff at Indonesian Embassy in Seoul. He also preached Islam in Seoul.

== Personal life ==
Fatah married a South Korean woman. The couple had two sons.

== Bibliography ==
- Jayusman, Jayusman (2000). Gerakan DI/TII Amir Fatah 1949–1950 suatu pemberontakan kaum santri di daerah Tegal-Brebes (Thesis). Universitas Indonesia.
