= Abdul Kahar Muzakkar =

Indonesian leader of the South Sulawesi Darul Islam branch

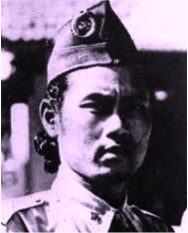
- Born: 24 March 1921; Luwu, Celebes, Dutch East Indies
- Died: 3 February 1965 (aged 43); Lasolo, Southeast Sulawesi, Indonesia
- Cause of death: Killed in action
- Movement: Darul Islam / Negara Islam Indonesia

Abdul Kahar Muzakkar (24 March 1921 – 3 February 1965) was the leader of an Islamic movement in South Sulawesi from 1950 till his death in 1965. He led his group of men in a guerrilla warfare against the Indonesian central government, and was finally killed by the army in the jungle. He was also the leader of the South Sulawesi branch of the Darul Islam movement, led Sekarmadji Maridjan Kartosoewirjo.

== Early life (1921–1943) ==
Born on 24 March 1921 in the Kingdom of Luwu, a smaller principality on the northern end of the Gulf of Bone, Abdul Kahar Muzakkar was formerly known as Ladomeng. Ladomeng is a Buginese word derived from 'dominoes', an allusion to his father who was playing cards at the time he was born. His father, Malinrang, was reportedly a businessman who was from the lower aristocracy class. Their family owned many lands, a sign of wealth at that period of time.

Kahar completed elementary school in 1934, and his parents then sent him to Muhammadiyah Standard School in Palopo (capital of Luwu) for 4 years. He was then sent to Solo in Central Java to study in the Kweekschool Muhammadiyah (Islamic Teachers College) from 1938 to 1941. It was in this last institution that Kahar was introduced to a number of prominent ulema, including a prominent modernist Muslim nationalist, Abdul Kahar Muzakkir. In fact, some people claimed that it was contact with this ulema that prompted Kahar to change his name from Ladomeng. There were other views, though, that Kahar had his name changed before he went to Solo, whilst according to Tommy Thomson, Kahar's former guard in the jungle, Kahar's 2 close friends, Jufri Tambora and Siddiq Bakri had been the one who asked Ladomeng to change his name to Kahar.

According to sources, Kahar was average as a student, and that his strength lay not in formal education, but in creativity and talent in dealing with problems. In fact, Kahar did not even complete kweekschool, partly because he married Walimah, a girl from Solo who was his first wife. It was with Walimah that he then returned to Palopo, teaching at a Muhammadiyah school until 1943. Though not an exceptional student, Kahar was actively involved in organizations, particularly after he had returned to Palopo. He joined the local Hizbul Wathan, the youth organization for Muhammadiyah, and was active in his opposition to what he called the feudal system in Luwu, and called for an end to the aristocracy. His opposition gained him many support from the Luwu youths. Kahar remained active in Hizbul Wathan until the arrival of the Japanese in 1942. During the Japanese occupation, Kahar worked as a clerk at the Nippon Hodobu, an information agency in Makassar under the Japanese authority.

In 1943, Kahar was sentenced by the Hadat (governing council) of the kingdom of Luwu to ripaopangitana [literally, to put someone or something face downward on the land], or simply to treat someone as dead. This form of punishment not only banishes the person from the kingdom, but also causes him to sever all ties which a Bugis or Makassar person is dependent on. There were varied accounts for the reason for such a sentence, all indicating that Kahar had alienated and angered the ruling powers in Luwu, particularly in his position as an activist of Hizbul Wathan. There are views that Kahar criticized the belief in Sawerigading, which claims that only the descendants of the Sawerigading can rule Luwu. According to his sister, Sulaeha, Kahar asked the aristocrats to discard the use of aristocratic titles, such as opu, due to its inherent discrimination. Military documentation also disclosed that Kahar rejected the tradition of bowing the knees before aristocrats. He also acted in ways that oppose the traditional system of his homeland, such as marrying a Javanese girl at a time when cross cultural marriages were not common in the Buginese tradition. According to Barbara Harvey, the versions of reasons for Kahar's exile are as many as the persons who spoke about it. Mukhlis, in his writing, attempted to interpret Kahar's punishment, concluding that he broke 2 main rules: Mapparibokoang Arung (guilty of self-importance and abusing his position) and he did mpleo weloie Arung (attempted to overthrow of the rulers' position) in his position as a Hizbul Wathan activist. At the time Kahar was expelled, he swore to return and marry a descendant of the Pajung (king), a prophecy which came true as he later married Andi Haliah, the granddaughter of the Pajung.

== Nationalist activities (1945–1949) ==
After his exile in 1943, Kahar moved to Java and set up a merchandise company known as Semangat Muda (Spirit of Youth). He also established a shop called Toko Luwu. It was through this business that Kahar entered the Indonesian nationalist movement. His company was used by him and his colleagues from South Sulawesi to establish an organization, Gerakan Pemuda Indonesia Sulawesi (Indonesian Youth Movement of Sulawesi, GEPIS) on 10 October 1945. This organization was later renamed Angkatan Pemuda Indonesia Sulawesi (Sulawesi Indonesian Youth Movement, APIS). This renamed organization became a part of the Angkatan Pemuda Indonesia (API) and was nationally recognized.

In one of his writings, Kahar revealed that he was one of Sukarno's bodyguards when the latter gave one of his first mass speeches in September 1945. He was the person, armed with only a machete, who was prepared to protect Sukarno and Hatta against the bayonets of the Japanese soldiers who tried to disperse the meeting and who encircled the car in which Sukarno and Hatta were driving. Kahar's role as bodyguard is not in question, with photographic evidence. According to Hamdan Juhannis, even Ukkas Arifin, a former nationalist activist in Kahar's movement who later became a member of the Republican military, revealed in his writing that he had witnessed the bravery of Kahar in guarding Sukarno in the same meeting.

Kahar helped in the founding of Kebaktian Rakyat Indonesia Sulawesi (Loyalty of the Indonesian People from Sulawesi, KRIS), along with A. "Zus" Ratulangie, daughter of the Republican Governor of Sulawesi. KRIS was the most famous of organisations in which Sulawesi youths participated in during the fight against the Dutch. APIS was merged into KRIS soon after and Kahar became the first secretary of KRIS. In this capacity, Kahar was tasked with forming branches of KRIS in East Java and Central Java, thus the formation of KRIS branches in Solo, Yogyakarta, Madiun, Malang, Tegal, Magelang and Cilacap. It was during this period that Kahar met a group of political prisoners of the Dutch from the Nusakambangan and Cilacap prisons, who originated from the outer islands. He was on his way to Cilacap when he interceded and negotiated the release of the 800-odd prisoners, who were then given brief military training. This battalion became the core of Kahar's army. It also operated as Sukarno's protection guard when he moved to Yogyakarta.

After leaving KRIS due to internal conflicts, Kahar was tasked by General Sudirman to prepare for the formation of a republican army in Sulawesi. He then formed the Tentara Republik Indonesia Persiapan Sulawesi (Sulawesi Preparatory Unit of the Army of the Republic of Indonesia, TRIPES) which was formed on 24 March 1946. The battalion of political prisoners whose release Kahar had negotiated formed the core of TRIPES. Members of Kris were also incorporated into TRIPES. Kahar was the commander of TRIPES, and he, helped by Major Andi Mattalatta and Major Saleh Lahade, both from South Sulawesi, began to organize the infiltration of soldiers from Java into South Sulawesi by boats in 1949. Kahar, however, remained in Yogyakarta and later formed a special military unit called Barisan Berani Mati (Dare-Devil Unit, BBM) from the last remaining battalion of the unit which fought in the Madiun area of East Java.

Following this, and the transfer of sovereignty of East Indonesia to the Republic in December 1949, Kahar had expected to be appointed commander of South Sulawesi since he had been one of the principal figures in organising and sending troops of Sulawesi youths back to their homeland in 1946 to support the pro-Republican guerrillas against the Dutch. However, his name was not in the list of newly appointed members of the Territorial Command for East Indonesia. This was a time when education, technical qualifications and discipline were all important and emphasized as criteria for qualifications, thus making Kahar ill-qualified. He did not have formal military training or battle experience, and his rebellious character was considered an obstacle to the integration of the army. Moreover, Kahar had no powerful friends in the military, thus opposition for his ambition to be commander of the South Sulawesi unit was not just by the army, but also by other South Sulawesi officers such as Saleh Lahade and Andi Mattalatta.

== Joining the rebellion (1950–1952) ==
Instead of commander of the South Sulawesi unit, Kahar was appointed as the commander of the Komando Grup Seberang (Group Commando for the Outer Islands, KGS) in October 1949. He was promoted to the rank of 'acting' lieutenant-colonel, and was put in charge of coordinating the guerrilla units in Sulawesi, Kalimantan, the Moluccas and Nusa Tenggara. Even before the appointment of Kahar as the commander of KGS, he had sent 2 of his staff officers, Saleh Sjahban and Bahar Mattaliu, to South Sulawesi to establish contact with the guerrilla forces there in April 1949. On 17 August 1949, the Kesatuan Gerilya Sulawesi Selatan (South Sulawesi Guerrilla Unit, KGSS) was founded with the aim of uniting the many guerrilla bands operating in the area.

After the formal recognition of Indonesia's independence by the Dutch, Kahar suddenly found himself an unemployed officer when the KGS was disbanded. At the same time, fighting broke out between the newly established army command in South Sulawesi and KGSS, when the latter demanded to be part of the TNI. Kahar was ordered to return to Sulawesi to negotiate with these young men. On 22 June 1950, Kahar arrived in Ujungpandang, and initially cooperated with the Indonesian government and army. However, upon his return from a meeting with the guerrillas, he put forward the proposal made by the guerrillas instead. The military commander of East Indonesia, Kawilarang, rejected the guerrillas' demands in a meeting with Kahar on 1 July 1950. Instead, Kawilarang issued a decree liquidating KGSS on the same day.

Kahar, according to Bahar Mattaliu, was very angry at Kawilarang's reaction. Kahar resigned from the Army, pulling off his insignia rank saying '"Ini tidak ada gunanya. (This is of no use)" to Kawilarang. He then threatened that if KGSS's demand was not accommodated, they would rebel. A few days later, Kahar was kidnapped into the forest by the KGSS on the initiative of Andi Sose, though it was suggested that the action had Kahar's tacit consent.

From then on, Kahar and KGSS had overwhelming support form the local population. This was a major factor which ensured the guerrillas' ability to safely operate in the area. Kahar became the leader of the movement, with his presence further encouraging the men, who looked up to him for his record as a soldier with the highest rank from Sulawesi. Many also saw Kahar as having been betrayed by the central government and deserving of sympathy.

Kahar had the guerrillas ignore the ban on KGSS, and functioned as an illegal organization. Though essentially enemies of the Republic, there were moments when KGSS assisted the Republican Army, notably in ensuring them a safe landing-place during the Andi Abdul Azis' rebellion and fighting against the Royal Netherlands East Indies Army (KNIL) However, during one of these assists, an incident occurred which cemented the hatred of the Sulawesi population against the Javanese, and by extension, the central government. It was alleged that one of the Republican units commanded by Captain Latief of the Mataram Brigade had opened fire on 2 guerrilla leaders and their contingents, with the intention of getting rid of the guerrillas. The 2 leaders, Arief Rate and Abbas Bangsawan, were killed, along with many of the guerrillas and Arief's whole contingent. This hatred by the population proved to be valuable to Kahar in his rebellion.

== Links to Darul Islam (1952–1965) ==
Recording Abdul Kahar Muzakkar last Speech in unknown date

Before 1952, Kartosuwirjo, the leader of the Darul Islam movement in West Java, sent a letter to Kahar inviting him to join his movement. Kahar only replied on 20 January 1952, accepting the invitation to make Sulawesi part of the Islamic State of Indonesia. However, Kahar clarified in the same letter that he did not think Sulawesi is ready to adopt the DI movement formally, as some of his followers were still influenced by communism [which happened before his arrival in Sulawesi] and the lack of commitment on their part in initiating an Islamic revolution. According to Kahar:

"Actually, we have also wanted to initiate an Islamic revolution since 16 August 1951 [based on what I plan with Brother Abd. Fattach and Brother Saleh Sjahban], but unfortunately, these two brothers are not committed. That made our effort failed and our power was defeated by stronger and more influential powers in society which were unconsciously influenced by 'reddish' ideology."

On 27 February 1952, Kartosuwirjo replied to Kahar's letter, appointing the latter as the commander of Division IV, Hasanudin of the Indonesian Islamic Army. Kartosuwirjo also expressed his gratitude to Kahar for acknowledging him as the supreme commander of the Islamic State of Indonesia, and reminded him of the importance of being under the banner of the Darul Islam. In the whole organization of DI in Indonesia, Kahar was the Deputy Minister of Defence, and the Commander of the Fourth Military District (East Indonesia) and the Fourth Division (Hasanuddin). However, there cannot be said to be an active coordination between the central DI movement and the South Sulawesi DI movement.

On 7 August 1953, Kahar formally proclaimed South Sulawesi as part of the West Java Darul Islam at a gathering in Makalua. He read the proclamation of 1949, claiming that Sulawesi and its surroundings were part of the Islamic State of Indonesia. At this same gathering, Kahar also issued several regulations to start off the new movement. He announced the new DI flags for South Sulawesi and its surroundings. The state flag was to be red with a yellow crescent and three yellow stars, while the military flag was red with three yellow stars and the number '24'. He also activated a curfew within the areas of DI, and Islamic law was formally adopted. Kahar called on those who were not Muslims to voluntarily support the Islamic community, and labelled the existing guerrillas who were not part of the Islamic army as quttautthariq (Ar. 'robbers').

In 1955, Kahar, in the name of the East Indonesia DI, called to the Muslim community, ulema, and Islamic political parties to understand the content of the term jihad. He also concentrated on the creation of a legal basis in the application of the formalist Islamic system within the organization. In 1955, the DI held a conference at Makalua, and a constitution known as the 'Makalua Charter' was drafted to guide the South Sulawesi people. Kahar created systems to support the existence of the NII. He started collecting taxes, all in the name of the Islamic state, and also established organizations. He founded a youth organization, Pemuda Islam Jihad, whilst his wife, Susana Corry van Stenus, instituted a woman's fighter corps called Laskar Wanita.

Kahar also began to extend the DI influences outside South Sulawesi, soon after he was accepted as being under the West Java DI. He first expanded DI to Southeast Sulawesi, and around 1955, North Sulawesi, Nusa Tenggara, Maluku and Irian Jaya came under the influence of Kahar's DI.

== Death ==
According to the information collected by Anhar Gonggong, Kahar was killed on 3 February 1965 by Corporal Sadeli of the Indonesian Army. It was reported that Sadeli heard the sound of a radio playing in the forest near the Lasolo River area, and approached the source of the sound, knowing that Kahar always carried with him a transistor radio. Sadeli had initially wanted to capture Kahar alive, but upon seeing the grenade in his hand, he shot to kill instead. He then compared a photograph of Kahar with that of the dead body, and concluded that the man he had killed was truly Kahar. The body was retrieved by a helicopter and flown to Makassar, where it was received by Mohammad Jusuf at Palemonia Hospital. Upon the announcement of Kahar's death, only one of his wives, 2 children and an uncle were authorized to see the body. Kahar's son, Abdullah, identified his father from the eczema on his foot and his dentures.

However, this claim of Kahar's death had been refuted by many of his followers. There were some who claimed that Kahar was a distance away from where the fighting purportedly took place. Moreover, Kahar was always surrounded by 2 platoons of armed bodyguards, and he carried a rifle, not a grenade, as was mentioned in the radio news and newspapers which reported on his death. For these followers, the government news stories were pure propaganda. A whole platoon claimed that they were with Kahar at Lasolo at the supposed time of death, and he disappeared when they left him for a while. However, there was no trace of bloodshed in the area to indicate any sort of fight or struggle. Mansur, one of Kahar's close assistant, also insisted that he was with Kahar when the latter's death was announced on the radio. A few days later, Kahar simply disappeared while Mansur was taking a bath in the river.

All these witness accounts point not to the death of Kahar, but to a mere disappearance, a view that was supported by his followers. There were some people who claimed that it was Jusuf who had merely faked the death of Kahar based on an earlier face-to-face meeting. These people believed that when Kahar and Jusuf met in Bonepute first on 21 October 1961 and then on 12 November 1961, Jusuf suggested to Kahar that he should go into hiding. It was said that they embraced tearfully. Based on this version, Kahar agreed to be picked up by helicopter to make his escape while another retrieved someone else's body in his place. According to Tihami (1984), the body was dropped in the sea between Makassar and Jakarta so that no one would be able to claim that it was not Kahar's. People also doubted Abdullah's capacity to identify his father as he had spent his childhood in Java with his mother, and rarely saw his father. He had only seen Kahar for 3 days 3 years before his death, although they did share a bed. Said Abdullah: "The problem is that no one else saw the corpse. I did, however." Another version that claims to refute Kahar's death draws on the Sulawesi tradition of a tomanurung (one who descends from heaven) who comes to earth to serve the ruler by protecting the general population from corrupt, authoritarian and abusive leaders. According to the myth constructed and believed by his followers, Kahar is a tomanurung. Therefore, he did not die, but ascended temporarily to heaven, awaiting the time when it is necessary to come back. These suggestions of Kahar as a tomanurung are usually accompanied by accounts of him living in exile, where he was both engaged in strategic work and at the same time practicing Sufi meditation.

For many of his followers, the issue of Kahar's alleged death is close for discussion he purportedly said before he left: "I'll go away from you all for some time, don't ever try to look for me, because you simply can't. But, if I want to, I can easily find you." There was also a very prevalent belief that Kahar had merely gone into hiding and had taken another persona. This new identity of Kahar, many believed, was Syamsuri Abdul Madjid also known as Syekh Imam Muhammad Al Mahdi Abdullah. Syamsuri died in 2006, and was said to have been close to Susana Corry van Stenus, one of Kahar's wives.

The government's position on this issue, though, is that Kahar is truly dead, killed in the jungle on 3 February 1965, a position sustained by both Harvey (1974) and van Dijk (1981). This, though, did not stop the contemporary movement from capitalising on the mystery and controversy of Kahar's death. Mansur's version of events at the time of Kahar's supposed death, though gotten third-hand and thus less reliable, had been the one that has galvanised the movement's followers. Jusuf's silence, on the other hand, had conspired in expanding the truth, wittingly or not. A core group of contemporary Kahar's loyalists includes a number of members of NGOs who are involved in a varied field of activities ranging from cooperatives, legal practice and farming, to youth training, and professionals employed in Sulawesi as teachers, lecturers, lawyers, consultants and engineers. In addition to evoking stories of his escape or his tomanurung status, contemporary staff members of the movement also institutionalise their stance on Kahar's death through the use of slogans attributed to him such as 'Javanese colonialism' and 'Majapahitism'.

== Personal life ==
Abdul Kahar Muzakkar is said to have had between nine wives, listed here with children they bore with him:

1. Siti Walinah Harjo Sudiro, a Javanese woman from Solo, Central Java, first woman he married at the age of 18
  1. Four children: Siti Faridah Muslimah, Abdullah Ashal Archiebal, Sri Revolusi Anna, and finally, Sitti Maesaroh
2. Corry Van Stenus, a Dutch-Indonesian woman;
  1. Six children; two died before adulthood, and one later, Guril Qahhar Mudzakkar. Among his surviving children were Hasan Kamal Said, Siti Riawati Muzakkar, and Abdullah Muzakkar
3. Andi Sitti Djanuari (1950-divorced 1952)
  1. One daughter, Siti Zaenab
4. Andi Sitti Haliah, a woman from a noble family in Luwu;
  1. One son, Andi Muzakkar
5. Andi Sitti Rawe, a woman from his home village;
  1. Two children: Ummu Kalsum Kahar Mudzakkar and Muslimin Qahhar Mudzakkar
6. Andi Siti Hamie;
7. Andi Sitti Habibah
  1. Two children: Buhari Kahar Mudzakkar and Abdul Azis Qahhar Mudzakkar.
8. Andi Tenri Liwang
9. Sitti Hudayah

== Legacy ==
Though he had been dead for many years, Kahar is still remembered in Sulawesi. His legacy differs for different groups, motivated by their own interests of regional politics and movement vitality. Many of the leaders and former members of Kahar's movement had operated underground and been in hiding after his death. Thus, many of the current members do not know each other as the leaders coordinate the operations through staff and cells. Therefore, Kahar's legacy often focuses on him being a symbol of the movement that he had been a part of.

Kahar had been remembered by non-members of the movement, even till today. Many of these non-members were knowledgeable about Kahar, but for various reasons, they were not supportive of it. Many claimed that they did not support him that time, and will not do so even now. Some said too, that Kahar had brought much suffering to the people of Sulawesi. For those who had been members but had left after Kahar's death, a clear goal and a replacement for Kahar as a capable leader is needed before they will support the movement again. For youths who had only known of the movement and Kahar recently, there are various opinions. Some had positive impressions as they too saw the 'need for a democratic federal state', whilst others had considered him a traitor to the country.

The issue of Kahar being either a rebel or fighter for the people of South Sulawesi had resurfaced in contemporary time, when South Sulawesi's governor, Syahrul Yasin Limpo, challenged the people to fight rebels in the area. This created an uproar of critiques from many parties in South Sulawesi. Many are of the opinion that Kahar was not a rebel or a traitor, but indeed, he was a patriot who had fought for Indonesia's independence. He only became a rebel to fight for a principle that he truly believed in.

In discussing Kahar, discussions on Kartosuwirjo and Daud Beureu'eh had also surfaced. These three figures had been active in the Darul Islam movement, a movement that some people in contemporary Indonesia still view as necessary. Many are of the opinion that these three figures had been excluded from national history, even though they had contributed to the fight for independence between 1945 till 1949 in Indonesia.

In contemporary time, Kahar's movement had been institutionalized in the form of two branch organizations, the Komite Persiapan Pelaksanaan Syariat Islam (Organizing Committee for the Preparation for the Application of Islamic Law; KPPSI) which was founded by Kahar's son Abdul Aziz 2000, and Pusat Amanat Referendum Rakyat Sulawesi (Center for Trusteeship of the Sulawesi People's Referendum; PARAS) which was also established in 2000.

== Writings ==
During the course of the rebellion, Kahar was active in writing. His writings include monographs, speeches and regulations. He was said to have written more than 10 monographs, of which not all are available to the public. Hamdan Juhannis claims that Kahar's writings especially reflect an effort to strengthen the legitimacy of Darul Islam as most touch on Islamic issues, quoting Quranic verses against the republican government. Several reasons for this had been brought forth, such that Kahar saw a need to 'Islamize' his DI community in South Sulawesi, and that he wrote for a general audience to help outsiders understand the nature of formalist Islamism.

Kahar's writings were influenced by his short-temperedness and his broad knowledge. Many of them were rather emotional, even to the extent of attacking his enemies like Sukarno. They also reflect his broad knowledge, especially on Islam and politics. Most of his writings can be categorised into general points, namely: his position from a defender to opponent of the pancasila, Islamic democracy verses Sukarno's Java-centricness, Islam versus other ideologies like the pancasila and communism, and his changing conception of state – from an Islamic federation to that of a caliphate system. According to Deliar Noer, Kahar's writings also are significant for it not only addressed the people in his time, but also provide lessons in idealism, and at least a guide for later generations to continue such idealism.
