= Suhandan Umar =

Indonesian bureaucrat

Tubagus Suhandan Umar
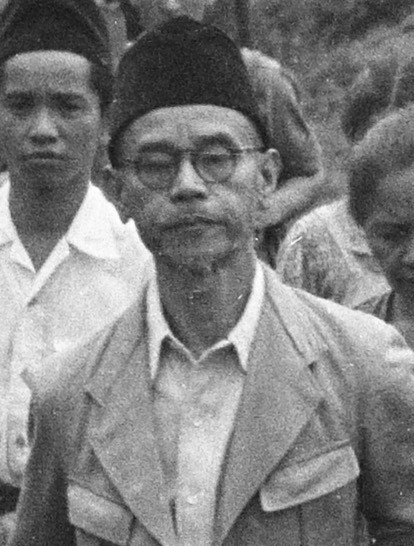

Regent of Bekasi (Note: As the Regent of Jatinegara until 15 August 1950.)
- In office 2 August 1949 – 19 October 1951
- Preceded by: Noer Alie
- Succeeded by: Sampoerno Kolopaking

Tubagus Suhandan Umar was an Indonesian bureaucrat who served as the Regent of Bekasi from 1949 until 1951.

== Regent of Jatinegara ==
During the mid-1949, Jatinegara (the old name for Bekasi) was a war-torn place, still marred with in-fightings between Indonesian army and rebel forces. Jatinegara was put under the control of a military resident. Following the resignation of the previous regent, Oja Sumantri, the military resident handed over the authority of appointing a new regent to Moh. Mu'min, the resident of Jakarta. Mu'min appointed Suhandan with a decree on 2 August 1949. Suhandan's Bekasi government was under the supervision of the military resident and effective control of the region was under military commander Second Lieutenant R. Yusuf.

By late 1949, Suhandan's office was located in Jatinegara, which is now the headquarters of the East Jakarta Military District. Nearing the Dutch–Indonesian Round Table Conference, conflict occurred between pro-Indonesian and pro-State of Pasundan (Dutch puppet state) officials. As a result, Suhandan's office had to be moved to the Malino shoe factory, which was located at an alleyway in the Pisangan Baru subdistrict.

On 17 January 1950, about twenty-five thousand Bekasi people gathered at the Bekasi City Square in support of the Indonesian republican government. The mass gathering demanded the dissolution of the federal government of the State of Pasundan as well as recognizing the Republic of Indonesia government as the sole government in the region. The masses also demanded to rename the Jatinegara regency into the Bekasi regency. The resolution was approved by the status quo government, and the incumbent government of Jatinegara handed over its authority to the People's Mandate Committee on behalf of the Bekasi people, represented by Madmuin Hasibuan and Sukardi. The committee appointed new officials to head the regional government, while Suhandan retained his office as the regent of Jatinegara. The military, represented by Second Lieutenant R. Yusuf, handed over its authority to Suhandan on 3 August 1950.

== Regent of Bekasi ==
Suhandan continued to serve as the regent after Jatinegara changed its name to Bekasi on 15 August 1950. At the time of his appointment, he assumed the office in an acting capacity. His appointment was made permanent a few months later. As the regent, Suhandan also chaired the six-member regional governing body, which was responsible for the day-to-day government of Bekasi. His deputy chairman in the governing body was former regent Noer Alie. Suhandan was the chair of the committee for the formation of the Provisional Regional People's Representative Council of Bekasi (the regency's regional parliament) and oversaw the indirect elections for the regional parliament sometime in the late 1950. The local parliament was officially formed with 35 members on 10 October 1950, with Madnuin Hasibuan, representing Masyumi, as its chair. During his tenure, there were little to no developments in Bekasi. Suhandan rejected proposals by the local parliament to build a junior high school in Bekasi, stating that "the construction of schools is the authority of the Department of Education and Culture, and the local government has no right to interfere."

Although the formation of local parliament was welcomed by the Bekasi populace and the central government, Suhandan viewed the parliament as its competitor. At a reception commemorating the formation of the local parliament in Bekasi's pavilion on 10 November 1950, Suhandan arrogantly stated that "the local parliament doesn't rule to overthrow people. If the regional parliament can overthrow me, don't think I couldn't retaliate." Relations between Suhandan and the Madnuin-led parliament got worse ever since. Suhandan never attended the parliament's session and instructed his employees to cut off ties with the regional parliament. Suhandan accused Madnuin of monopolizing fisheries, while Madnuin accused Suhandan of maintaining contacts with the Bambu Runcing separatist group.

On 5 May 1951, the regional parliament issued a motion of no confidence against Suhandan, stating that Suhandan was unable to govern anymore and that his subordinates were "destructive. Suhandan retaliated by accusing several members of the regional parliament of extortion and threatened to take action against members of the parliament who were involved. His actions were backed by the district chieftains of Bekasi, who on 9 May held a meeting in support of Suhandan. A dispute arose between Suhandan and the parliament concerning the seat of government for Bekasi. While the governing body and local parliament agreed on moving to Bekasi, Suhandan insisted on retaining Jatinegara as the capital.

The conflict culminated in the dismissal of Sanusi, Bekasi's regional secretary, following accusations of embezzlement from the regional parliament. Noer Alie attempted to resolve the conflict between the two by holding a private conversation with Suhandan. Noer demanded Suhandan to cut off contacts with the Bambu Runcing separatist group, but he was ignored. The West Java provincial governing body, led by Sanusi Hardjadinata, also attempted to form a resolution between the two parties by proposing to send Suhandan to Yogyakarta to pursue further studies, but to no avail.

On 13 September 1951, Suhandan was arrested on the orders of provincial attorney general R. Sunarjo. Authorities discovered that Suhandan had been storing a large stash of weapons without any permit. A total of 32 weapons, consisting of pistols, hand grenades, jungle carbines, sten guns, Tommy guns, and other types of weapons, were discovered at his official residence. Police also discovered a pistol at his office. Suhandan's subordinate, Sirad, was arrested between 16 and 17 September after he was found instructing his staff to transfer weapons from his house to an empty house. Suhandan was officially dismissed from his office on 19 October 1951 and was assigned to the Department of Home Affairs. Noer Alie was appointed by Suhandan from the prison to assume the office in an acting capacity.
