= Daniel Alexander Maukar =

Indonesian Air Force pilot (1932–2007)

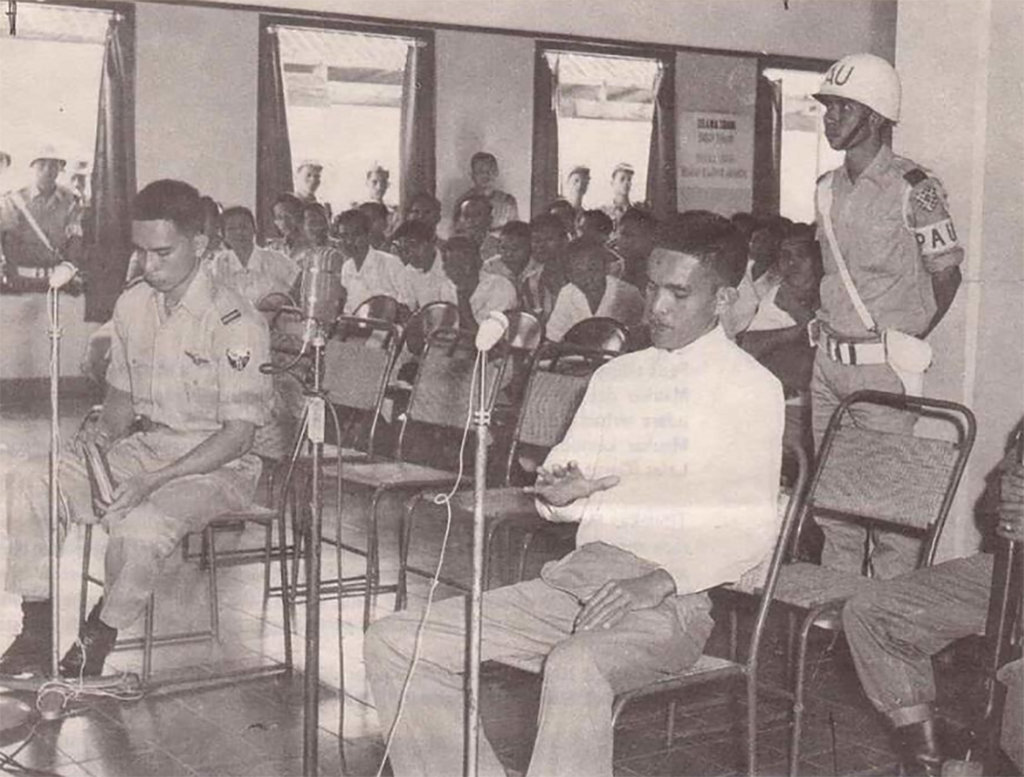
- Daniel Maukar (left) and Sam Karundeng (right) on trial in Jakarta (1960)
- Born: 20 April 1932; Bandung, Dutch East Indies
- Died: 16 April 2007 (aged 74); Jakarta, Indonesia
- Burial place: Pondok Rangon Cemetery, Jakarta
- Military career
- Allegiance: Indonesia
- Branch: Indonesian Air Force
- Rank: Second lieutenant
- Nicknames: Dani, "Last Tiger", "The Tiger"
- Unit: 11th Air Squadron
- Other work: Priest

Daniel Alexander Maukar (20 April 1932 ‒ 16 April 2007) was a pilot in the Republic of Indonesia Air Force (AURI) known for shooting at the State Palace on 9 March 1960. Although initially brought before a military court and threatened with the death penalty, Maukar received a pardon from then President Sukarno. Instead of the original death sentence, he was sentenced to 8 years' imprisonment. At the beginning of the New Order, Maukar was released by Suharto, who had just taken office as the second President of Indonesia.

== Early life ==
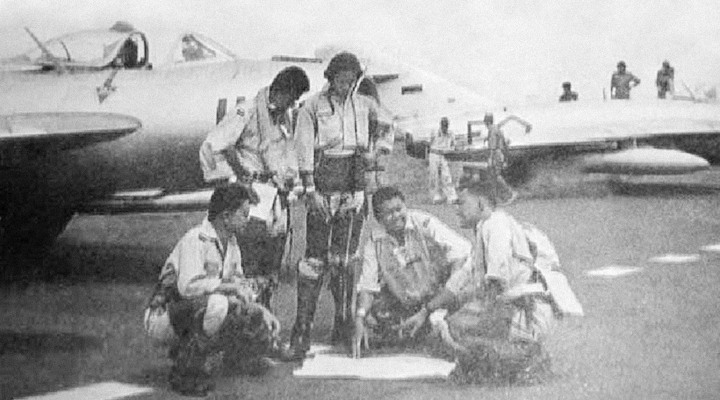
Daniel Maukar (middle) discussing with his fellow pilots at Kemayoran airfield, Jakarta.

Daniel was born in Bandung on 20 April 1932 to Karel Herman Maukar and Enna Talumepa, and he was of Minahasan descent. He later grew up in Menteng, Jakarta. Not much personal information exists about his private life prior to the incident. While studying to become a pilot at AURI, Daniel was mentored by Heru Atmodjo, a senior pilot at AURI. He was known as an intelligent young pilot with high potential as a prospective fighter pilot. To his mentor, he was considered one of the best members of his generation, earning him the nickname "The Tiger." To the government, he was labeled the second best fighter jet pilot in the Indonesian Air Force. This trust in his abilities led to his role as an Air Force fighter pilot in the 11th Air Squadron, where he was entrusted with flying the prestigious Mikoyan MiG-17 fighter jet, one of the most sophisticated aircraft Indonesia had in the 1960s.

== Incident ==
=== Recruitment to Manguni ===
A year prior to the incident, Daniel and his brother Herman Maukar were approached by Samuel Karundeng, a close colleague since the Japanese occupation of Indonesia. In a vague offer, Sam invited both of them to take part in a conspiracy, which Daniel refused. It wasn't until February 1960 in Bandung that Herman explained the goals of the movement to Daniel, revealing that Samuel was part of a group called "Manguni," which aimed to "demand national peace." Herman disclosed that he and Sam had been working together to mobilize anti-Sukarno forces in the name of Permesta. Previously, Sam had attempted to carry out economic sabotage, collect intelligence data for Permesta, provoke clashes between groups, and conduct military operations. After landing in Java, he recruited Herman.

Upon Daniel's return from Egypt, where he had been training to fly a MiG-17 fighter jet, Herman actively tried to convince him to join the Manguni group, openly expressing his intention to sabotage vital objects belonging to the Republican government. In a meeting attended by Herman on 6 February 1960, the Manguni group had previously agreed to kidnap government figures, with Minahasan youth as the executors. Their targets included President Sukarno, Minister Djuanda, Major General Gatot Subroto, Chaerul Saleh, Surjadarma, Mochamad Jasin, and former Javanese student soldiers. Under the orders of the Manguni Council (Dewan Manguni), led by Lieutenant Colonel Ventje Sumual, Herman was to convince his brother Daniel to defect from AURI and join the AUREV (Revolutionary Air Force), which was Permesta's air wing at that time. To the Manguni Council, Daniel was a perfect candidate for recruitment due to his resentment against the current government, outstanding flying skills, and background as a devout Christian and Minahasan youth. Despite each explanation, Daniel repeatedly doubted the success of this action plan. To convince Daniel, Herman had invited him to a Manguni meeting at Jalan Citarum 32, Bandung. There, Daniel realized the scope of the Manguni group. In a meeting, Colonel Sukanda Bratamenggala stated his readiness to deploy two companies of armed troops which would later be led by Major Bunjamin. Sam had hopes for help from allied DI/TII guerilla troops stationed inland in the forests of East Java, May 3 Battalion (Army) personnel, cavalry members at the Bandung Cavalry Center, Brimob, as well as from youth groups in the Manguni, Sisingamangaradja, Hasanuddin, and Siliwangi organizations. The aim was to seize vital objects in Jakarta, Bandung, Bogor, and Sukabumi. After convincing Daniel that Manguni's main goal was to demand national peace, he eventually joined the Manguni group offering himself to be the Minahasan youth to execute the plan, saying; "I said, if you wait for a sign, [then] until when. Well fine if that's the case, then I'll just give you a sign. Just tell me [and I'll] shoot, tell me to shoot what now."

=== Strafing ===
One night before 2 March 1960, the group met again to devise a plan of action. Major Sutisna determined that Dani's target was Halim Perdanakusumah Air Forcebase. Daniel refused, citing that it was his home. Sutisna reevaluated and decided on the targets of Merdeka Palace, a fuel tank in Tanjung Priok, and Bogor Palace, after which Daniel had to fly to Singapore. In the event that Singapore wasn't an option, Daniel was "told to jump to Malangbong" according to Sam in court documents. To Sam, Malangbong was the codename for the "base of operations for Battalion 3 May" which was established in Manado in 1950 and had many members from Minahasa, Daniel's ancestral homeland and the center of the Permesta movement. Originally planned to be carried out on 2 or 3 March, the plan was postponed. The plan was that the shooting would be followed by troops moving to Jakarta. On 8 March they gathered again. If the shooting was carried out on the 8th, then on the 9th there would be a troop movement, and by then the kidnappings would happen as agreed prior. Eventually, 9 March 1960 was chosen for the execution date as it coincided with Daniel Maukar's solo training schedule, thereby reducing the risk of suspicion by other AURI members.

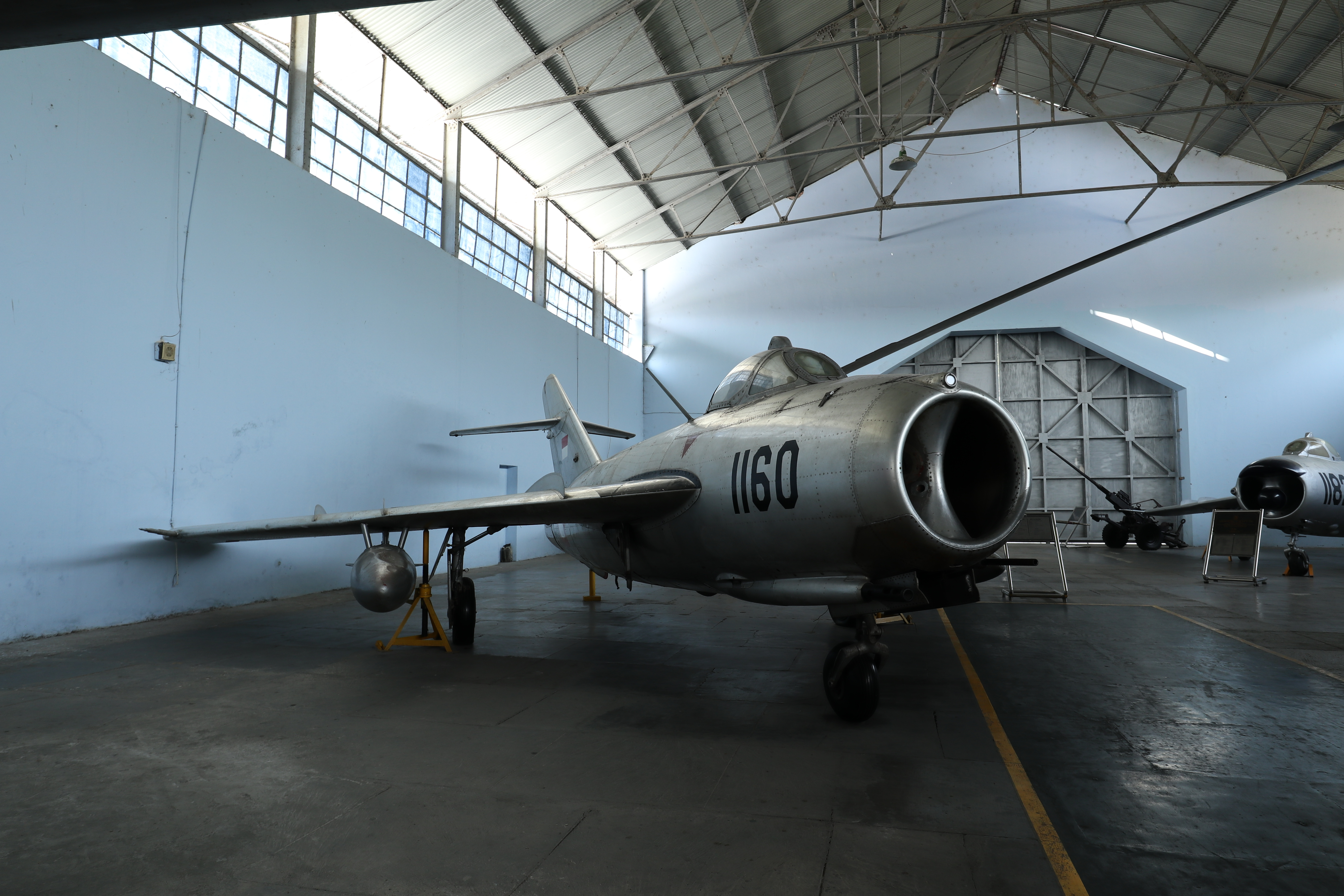
MiG-17-Fresco used by the 11th Air Squadron. Daniel Maukar used a similar aircraft

On the early morning of 9 March 1960, Daniel met Sam briefly and initiated the plan. Traveling from Bandung, Daniel landed his MiG-15 jet on the tarmac at Kemayoran airfield. By mid-afternoon, he had his turn to fly the MiG-17 jet as part of a routine training exercise. Joining him in the airspace were Flight First Lieutenant Goenadi, Flight Second Lieutenant Sapoetro, and Flight Lieutenant First Sofjan Hamsjah, all having a training schedule with their MiG-17s. At 11:45 am, with the call sign "Tiger," Daniel entered the cockpit of the MiG-17 jet numbered 1112. Daniel's MiG was armed with three cannons, though one of them was damaged. He soon sped the aircraft down the Kemayoran runway. Being the last in order, he ignored the task of flying training to the south of Jakarta and deviated towards the Bataafse Petroleum Maatschappij (BPM) tank. Daniel knew that the BPM tank area was a closed and quiet area. It was not difficult to find out about the area because his brother, Herman, worked at BPM. He aimed his aircraft at BPM's fuel tanks in Tanjung Priok. From an altitude of 2,800 feet (853 meters), Daniel dived the MiG-17 with a 30-degree angle and strafed the fuel tank until it exploded. Daniel then pitched up and, with roaring speed, he went south to the Merdeka Palace.

At 12:00, eyewitnesses reported hearing a deafening sonic boom as a jet flew low directly above Central Jakarta. Moments later, they saw a MiG-17 turning around and banking left from Gambir. From an altitude of 600 meters, Daniel dived and aimed at the room where Sam had told him that every working day, President Sukarno was usually in the room to the right of the palace. With one of the still-operating double 23mm Nudelmann-Rikhter automatic cannons, Daniel fired once from the south. The shooting caused some of the windows, doors, and walls to be damaged by the barrage of bullets. A pillar in the palace also collapsed and hit the president's desk. However, Sukarno was not present during the shooting as he was attending a session at the National Council (Dewan Nasional), a mere 20 meters from the Merdeka Palace. Alarmed, members of the National Council were stirred by the sound of the low-flying jet, prompting President Sukarno to calm them down in Dutch. At this point, Daniel had second thoughts, feeling nervous and uneasy about the situation. Nevertheless, after strafing the presidential palace, Daniel's MiG passed over the Tomang flood canal, then headed southward to his designated third target, the Bogor Palace. Five minutes into the flight, Daniel reached Bogor. He aimed down towards Bogor Palace, but unlike Merdeka Palace, his shot missed completely. Reluctantly, Daniel kept firing and expended all of his Nudelman N-37 37mm cannon. After strafing all three targets, Daniel pitched up once again and climbed to 18,000 feet.

"A low-flying plane dropped its package of death squarely on the place in which, except for the hand of God, I would have been sitting."

— Sukarno, on his assassination attempt.,

=== Capture and trial ===
With limited fuel only intended to be used for a practice flight, Daniel was unable to reach Singapore. Consequently, he followed Sam's contingency plan and redirected his course towards point Malangbong in Garut, where Sam and Herman would wait for him by giving a smoke signal. His flight path to point Malangbong took him over Bandung. There he searched for a smoke signal, but none was seen. In court, Sam admitted that the smoke signal Herman lit was too small for Daniel to see. Running out of fuel and with no other options, at 14:00, he had to take an emergency landing in a paddy field in Leles, Garut, notable for being the center of the Darul Islam rebellion. Air Captain Dudi Rahaju Kamarudin noted the aircraft's state after landing. the MiG-17's left wing was severed, the right wing was covered in mud, and the airbrake was damaged. Had Daniel arrived at point Malangbong safely, he planned to return to Halim at night, believing in Sam's plan of takeover. After crash landing, Daniel's initial plan was to seek protection from Darul Islam, who were equally hostile to Sukarno. But the plan failed as on the same day, Daniel was arrested by Kodam III/Siliwangi Division soldiers. He was then taken to Jakarta to undergo a series of examinations the next day as he was badly hurt. At point Malangbong, both Sam and Herman were awaiting for Daniel's MiG-17 until an announcement was made on the radio of Daniel's crash in Leles, Garut. The takeover did not happen. In the aftermath of the strafing, an investigation was immediately launched, and a manhunt for the perpetrators ensued. Minister of Information Maladi, in a press statement on 14 March 1960, revealed that a number of weapons and documents planning the assassination of the head of state had been found. These items were discovered a week before the incident during a raid in Kebayoran Lama. According to Abdul Haris Nasution, after the capture of a member of the Manguni group, the group had subordinate organizations called Manimporok, Masarang, Mahatus, Soputan, and Mahawu. AURI Assistant Director of Aviation, Air Major Agus Suroto, announced that the AURI Court would try Daniel in a state of war.

In his trial, Daniel was represented by Hadeli Hasibuan, who had previously represented a person involved in another unrelated assassination attempt on Sukarno in 1957. The Air Force established a five-member tribunal chaired by Lieutenant Colonel Notowidagdo. In a court session on Tuesday, 21 June 1960, Daniel's actions were stated to be related to Permesta, which was still engaged in guerrilla fighting in North Sulawesi at that time. According to him, "regarding the peace operation [with the Manguni group,] Permesta did not know about it." This did not explain the items found in the raid. In court, Daniel still could not grasp the scope or inner workings of the Manguni group. Eventually, he felt that Sam and Herman were using him for his piloting abilities, blaming them and his naivety for ruining his piloting career. Nasution revealed that for Daniel's actions, he had been awarded a mere Rp.20,000 (or $27.52 today) by the Manguni Group. There is a strong opinion that these targets were purposefully chosen to hit and miss as a way terrorize Sukarno. Daniel stated that he did not intend to kill Sukarno as he had made sure he did not see the yellow flag being raised at the palace, which would indicate that the president was present. He in fact had admired Sukarno. Before his flight, he had asked a Halim base officer, who had just returned from the front of the palace, about the flag. The officer confirmed that the flag was not waving. In the end, on 16 July 1960, based on evidence collected up until 14 March 1960, that being his aircraft and the weapons used by Daniel, he was found guilty by the Air Force Court Martial and sentenced to death for his actions. His execution was scheduled for the same date; however, it was not carried out and was stalled. He was brought back to court four days later. Nevertheless, his death penalty still stood. During this time, Daniel spent his days in custody, awaiting his execution. However, in 1964, Maukar was granted a pardon by President Sukarno.

== Later life ==
In March 1968, he was completely released during the era of President Suharto. Traumatized by the incident, Daniel admitted that thoughts about death continued to haunt him. This affected him so deeply that he dedicated himself to theology and became a priest for the rest of his life. Living a simple and quiet life, Daniel died on 16 April 2007, at Cikini Hospital.
