= Cikini Incident =

1957 failed assassination attempt on Indonesian President Sukarno

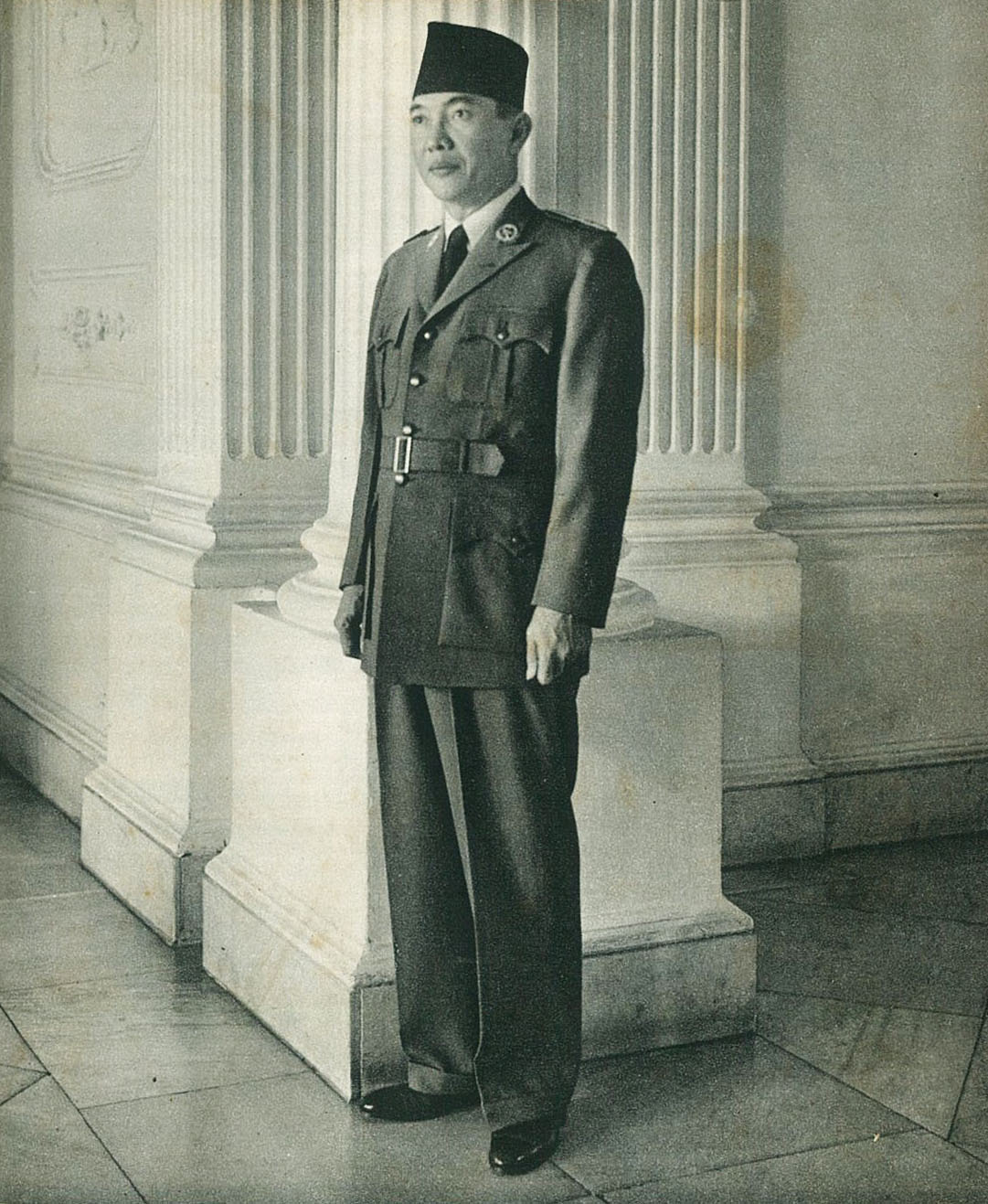
- Sukarno in 1952
- Location: 6°11′41″S 106°50′22″E; Cikini School, Jakarta, Indonesia
- Date: 30 November 1957; 68 years ago 20:55 (Java Time; UTC+07:30)
- Target: Sukarno
- Attack type: Attempted assassination
- Weapon: Hand grenades
- Deaths: 9–11 (Note: Sources indicating nine deaths include The Montreal Star (1958b, p. 31), Fischer (1959, p. 227), and Brackman (1963, p. 242). Sources indicating ten deaths include Time (1957, p. 32), Sukarno & Adams (1966, p. 273), and Lararenjana (2021). Sources indicating eleven deaths include The New York Times (1960, p. 6), Kahin & Kahin (1995, p. 112), and McIntyre (2005, p. 142).)
- Perpetrators: Saadon bin Mohammed; Tasrif bin Hussein; Jusuf Ismail; Moh. Tasim bin Abubakar

The Cikini Incident or Cikini Affair (Indonesian: Peristiwa Cikini), also known in Indonesia as the Cikini Tragedy (Indonesian: Tragedi Cikini), was an assassination attempt against President Sukarno of Indonesia. On 30 November 1957, Sukarno attended the fifteenth anniversary celebrations of the Cikini School in Cikini, Jakarta, with his son Guntur and daughter Megawati. While his children entered the school to watch a film, Sukarno walked towards his limousine as a crowd gathered around him. When he was approximately halfway to the vehicle, five grenades were thrown from individuals hidden within the crowd. Sukarno was initially thrown to the ground by his aide Sudarto, who then worked with two bodyguards to rush him into a building across the street.

Although Sukarno escaped the attack unscathed, delivering a brief speech to the nation shortly afterwards, the grenades killed several bystanders and wounded dozens more, with most of the casualties being children. The Indonesian military arrested more than seventy individuals by the end of December, and unsuccessfully pursued former intelligence chief Zulkifli Lubis as the potential mastermind. Four attackers—Saadon bin Mohammed, Tasrif bin Hussein, Jusuf Ismail, and Moh. Tasim bin Abubakar—were found guilty at trial in 1958; three were sentenced to death and one to twenty years' imprisonment. All were members of the Anti-Communist Movement led by Lubis; a number were also affiliated with the Islamic party Masyumi. Fallout from the attack led several Masyumi leaders to flee Jakarta for Sumatra, ended government negotiations with dissident groups, and exacerbated anti-Dutch sentiment. Sukarno, who ruled Indonesia until 1967 and survived several further attacks, later came to believe that the Central Intelligence Agency had orchestrated attempts on his life.

== Background ==
Sukarno became the President of Indonesia on 17 August 1945, the day he proclaimed the nation's independence. He led the country through a four-year national revolution against returning Dutch colonial forces, which ended in December 1949 with formal recognition of Indonesian sovereignty. The new country implemented a parliamentary system and in 1955 Indonesia held its first legislative election. Sukarno remained the country's president, though his critics accused him of lacking a coherent political vision and focusing excessively on personal pleasures.

At the same time, his government faced several challenges to its rule. Groups such as the Dewan Banteng (lit. 'Bull Council') and Dewan Gajah ('Elephant Council') in Sumatra, decried the national government's treatment of less developed areas outside Java. Meanwhile, the Darul Islam rebellion clashed with government forces through the 1950s in its efforts to establish an Islamic state. To control unrest, Sukarno attempted to reach compromises with dissident groups, though he also had plans for "Guided Democracy" that would unite feuding political parties under his singular rule.

== Attack ==
Indonesia 1, in which the third grenade exploded

On 30 November 1957, President Sukarno attended the fifteenth anniversary celebration of the Cikini School at 76 Cikini Street in Cikini, Jakarta, a combined primary and junior secondary school popular with the city's elites. Speaking with Cindy Adams in the 1960s, he recalled that more than five hundred guests were in attendance, as well as teachers, children, and thousands of spectators. The school celebrations included numerous forms of entertainment, including games and stage performances, and Sukarno spent time with his children Guntur and Megawati, both students of the school. A third child, Rachmawati, was enrolled at Cikini but not in attendance because she was sick.

After Sukarno delivered a speech, Guntur and Megawati reentered the school building to watch a film. Sukarno left, surrounded by a crowd. He headed across the schoolyard for his limousine, a Chrysler Imperial known as Indonesia 1. At 20:55 Java Time, Sukarno was about halfway to his car. Soon after the commander of his escort called "Attention!", the sound of a gunshot was heard. A grenade soon followed, the first of five thrown by individuals concealed in the crowd. Amidst the ensuing panic, exacerbated by numerous students exiting the school building, Sukarno was grabbed by his escort, Adjunct Police Inspector Sudio.

A second grenade was thrown at Sukarno from close range. The president was then thrown to the ground and covered by his aide, Major Sudarto. With two bodyguards, Sudarto grabbed Sukarno and pulled him past Indonesia 1, shortly before a third explosion destroyed its interior and wounded Sudarto. Fourth and fifth grenades followed, with the latter injuring one of the bodyguards. Speaking with the newspaper Sin Min after the incident, Sudarto recalled, "I realized that there was no other way to save the President's life from the danger other than sacrifice myself. ... We—Adjunct Police Inspector Sudio, Officer Oding [Suhendar], and myself—were the last line of defence." (Note: Original: "Saya berpendapat tidak ada jalan lain menyelamatkan jiwa Presiden dari bahaya maut itu kecuali mengorbankan diri terlebih dahulu. ... Kami, Ajun Inspektur Polisi Sudio, anggota polisi Oding, dan saya sendiri sebagai perisai terakhir)

Sukarno was brought across the street, initially seeking shelter in the home of a Dutch-Indonesian. Sukarno later recalled, "Lest the President of Indonesia meet his maker on Dutch territory, I scurried out and into another shelter." As Sukarno hid, Sudarto ordered the others to shoot anyone who approached. Because the telephone lines were down, they were unable to call for help. Nonetheless, a reserve car arrived to retrieve Sukarno at approximately 22:00 Java Time. Unable to go directly to Merdeka Palace due to closed railway gates, the president and his aides circled Jakarta's streets. Guntur and Megawati, meanwhile, were able to be brought from the school directly to the palace, where they awaited news from Sukarno.

== Aftermath ==
=== Casualties ===
Victims of the Cikini attack

Sukarno was uninjured, as were his children. Initial reports indicated 7 fatalities among bystanders, with another 47 wounded. Among those killed were two members of the Presidential Guard, a pregnant woman, and several children. Sumaji, the director of the Cikini School, had been walking alongside Sukarno and was heavily wounded. Oding's thigh was ripped open, while Sudarto was hospitalized for an injury to his leg; Sudarto later received a promotion for his actions.

By midnight, more than seventy people had been hospitalized at the Central Hospital (now Dr. Cipto Mangunkusumo Hospital) and the Cikini Hospital. The Indonesian government called for available doctors to immediately attend to victims, with responding physicians included Minister of Health Abdul Azis Saleh. The Indonesian Red Cross called for blood donations to support the wounded, with similar calls also being issued by the Communist Party of Indonesia (PKI). Further medical support was provided by the Soviet embassy.

Casualty figures increased to 9 deaths by 1 December, with casualties being mostly children. Fifty people remained in hospital. Subsequent casualty reports varied, with the number of fatalities ranging from nine to eleven. Reports of non-fatal wounds, meanwhile, ranged from at least 30 to 167. (Note: Other figures include 48 (Amaruli), 146 (The Waco Times-Herald 1957, p. 7), and 150 (Brackman 1963, p. 242).)

=== Government response ===
Hours after the attack, Sukarno delivered a radio address on Radio Republik Indonesia, interrupting a wayang kulit (shadow puppetry) broadcast. In his brief speech, he praised God for his escape, called for calm and sympathy for the victims, and urged continued Indonesian unity. Representatives of diverse Indonesian political parties, including the Islamic political party Masyumi and the PKI, expressed their sympathies for Sukarno and the victims of the attack. Speaking ahead of a cabinet meeting on 3 December 1957, former vice-president Mohammad Hatta expressed disbelief that such an attack could have been perpetrated in a nation that believed in God and humanitarian values, saying "If we love democracy, we must endeavour to the best of our abilities to eradicate such fascist methods from our sacred land." (Note: Original: "Apabila kita cinta kepada demokrasi, marilah kita berusaha sekuat tenaga supaya metode fasis ini terkikis dari bumi sakti kita.") International leaders, including Prime Minister Jawaharlal Nehru of India, Marshal Kliment Voroshilov of the Soviet Union, and President Dwight D. Eisenhower of the United States, sent telegrams expressing their condolences for the casualties and congratulations for Sukarno's escape.

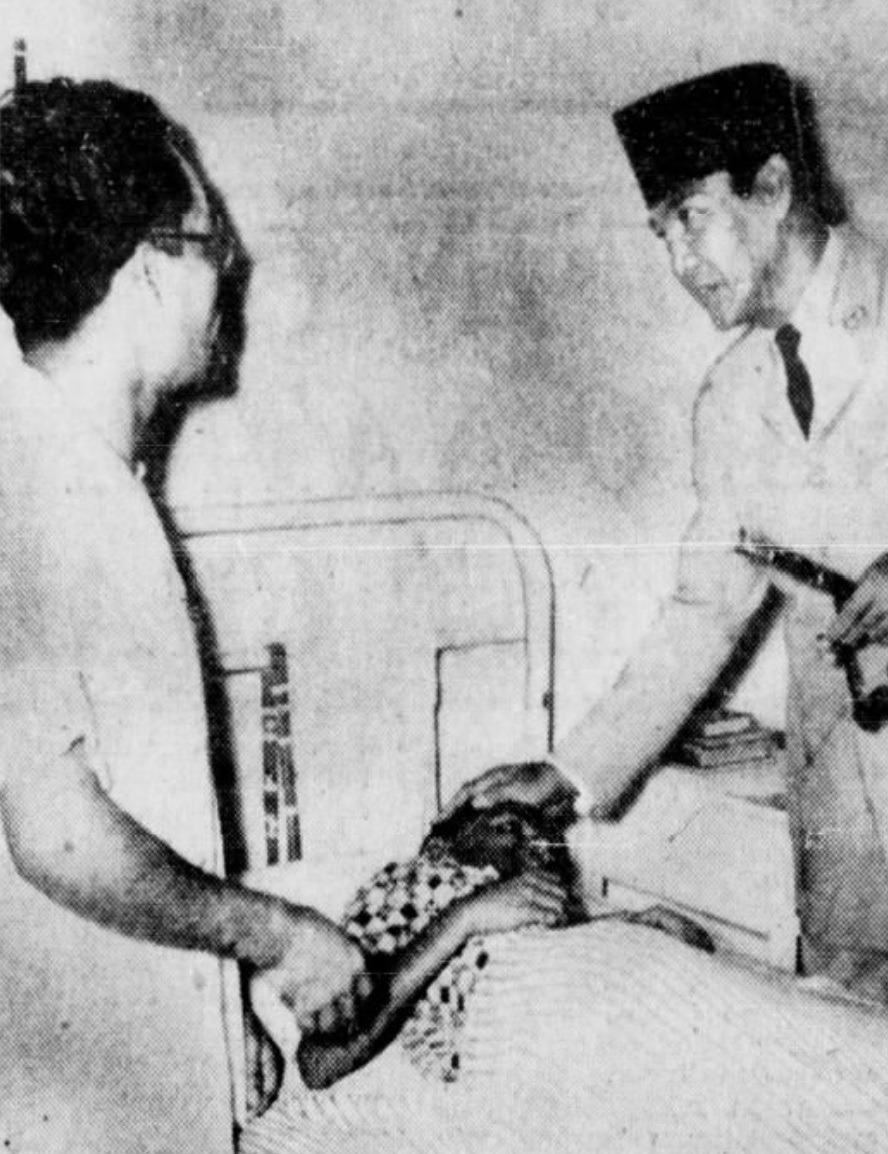
Sukarno (right) visiting a survivor of the attack with Abdul Halim

Security was increased for Hatta and members of Sukarno's cabinet, with additional guards deployed at government offices and other potentially vulnerable sites. Elsewhere, traffic leaving Jakarta was subject to search. The Indonesian military cancelled all leave and required its members to return to their posts. Minister of Education Prijono mandated that all schools fly their flags at half-mast on 2 December 1957 as a part of a day of mourning. The Cikini School remained closed in the immediate aftermath, with its grounds closely guarded.

Sukarno did not make a public appearance until 4 December, when he visited the wounded in hospital, and he postponed a planned trip to Latin America. Sukarno was deeply shaken by the assassination attempt, being described by Prime Minister Djuanda Kartawidjaja as "physically and mentally tired" and uncharacteristically losing his train of thought mid-sentence. He took a month-long sabbatical, beginning late December. During this period, Sartono served as acting president, leading to later-debunked rumours that Sukarno had been overthrown.

=== Investigation ===
Although no suspects were initially reported, the Indonesian military initiated an expansive search and launched multiple raids. By 2 December, they announced that two individuals had been arrested in connection to the attack, with another wave of arrests the following day. By the end of December 1957, the Indonesian military reported 71 detentions, including several foreign citizens. Many of those arrested were accused of participating in other, unrealized plots, including attacks against Prime Minister Djuanda and General Abdul Haris Nasution.

The Indonesian government identified Zulkifli Lubis as the mastermind behind the attack. Previously serving as the first director of the State Intelligence Agency, Lubis had established the Anti-Communist Movement (Gerakan Anti-Komunis, GAK) in 1957 and promoted anti-government viewpoints. Based on testimonies from captured members of the movement, he was accused of working with the Darul Islam movement, and an arrest warrant was issued on 22 January 1958. An associate of Lubis's, Saleh Ibrahim, was also sought. Neither man was arrested, and they both fled to West Sumatra. (Note: In Sumatra, Lubis joined the Revolutionary Government of the Republic of Indonesia. He evaded capture until after Sukarno was overthrown (Tirto.id). While he acknowledged meeting the perpetrators, he denied involvement in the attack, and charges were later withdrawn (Amaruli). Meanwhile, Ibrahim was killed fighting the Indonesian military in 1960 (Nugroho 2013, p. 117).)

Four youths had been identified as the attackers and arrested by 5 December 1957. Two of them, Jusuf Ismail and Tasrif bin Hussein, were teachers, while the youngest was a student named Saadon bin Mohammed. The fourth was an unemployed man named Moh. Tasim bin Abubakar. These attackers, most of whom came from Bima or Sumbawa, were found staying in a dormitory near the school. All were members of GAK, and suspected by investigators to have been influenced by Darul Islam. During interrogation, the youths stated that they had begun preparations several months in advance. Initially expecting Sukarno to seek shelter in his limousine, they had targeted the vehicle and been slow to react to the emerging situation. As their motivation, the youths cited Sukarno's continued support for the PKI, which they identified as detrimental to Muslim groups. They identified Lubis as having shaped their anti-government views and Ibrahim as giving the command to execute the attack.

=== Trial ===
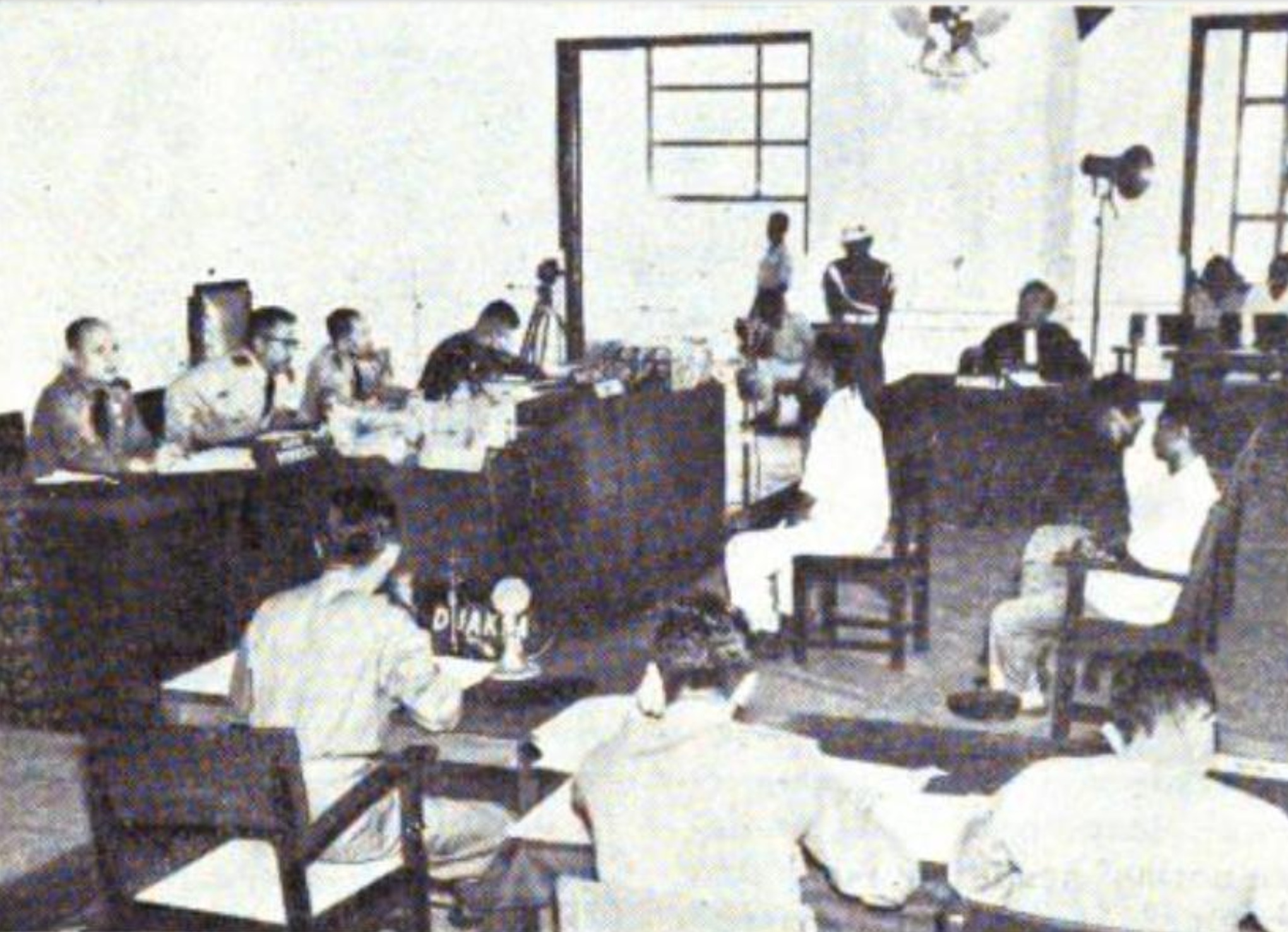
Tasrif bin Hussein (centre) on trial, c. June 1958

On 11 December 1957, the Indonesian military announced that the four youths would be tried by military tribunal consisting of three officers. Trials began in April 1958, with Lieutenant Colonel Hadi Purnomo, Major Amir Murtomo, and Major Sucipto presiding. Prosecution was handled by Major Surosejono, with the defence provided by an army captain. The trials were covered extensively in the Indonesian press, with testimonies printed verbatim.

In his testimony, Tasrif denounced Sukarno as a "mere orator" and kafir (unbeliever) who "had to be eliminated". Jusuf, who was identified in court as having planned the attack, described Sukarno as the "chief protector of the Communists". Co-defendant Saadon argued that violence would achieve his goals more quickly than waiting for parliament. The youths also stated that they had already perpetrated several previous attacks to advance an Islamic state and to have planned further attacks on other national leaders. The American historian Audrey Kahin writes that their testimony in court was likely prompted by the government.

All defendants pled guilty, and the prosecution sought death penalties for Saadon, Tasrif, and Jusuf, and twenty years' imprisonment for Tasim. The application of the death penalty was widely supported by the Indonesian public, and before the verdict was returned anonymous notices were posted on nearby buildings calling for the executions of all four defendants. Thousands of Indonesians attended the court on 13 August 1958 to hear the judges return their verdict: guilty. Saadon, Tasrif, and Jusuf were sentenced to death. After their appeal was denied, they were executed by firing squad on 28 May 1960 in what The New York Times described as likely the first time the death sentence had been implemented in independent Indonesia. Tasim was sentenced to twenty years' imprisonment. (Note: Later sources report different outcomes for Tasim. For instance, the historians Audrey and George McTurnan Kahin write that he was sentenced to life imprisonment (Kahin & Kahin 1995, p. 113), while the Ministry of Education's Encyclopedia of Indonesian History records all four attackers as having been executed (Amaruli).)

== Impact and legacy ==
During the investigation, Masyumi came under suspicion. Many of the perpetrators were members of its youth wing, the Indonesian Muslim Youth Movement (Gerakan Pemuda Islam Indonesia), and a party member's automobile had been used in the attack. In late December 1957, prominent party leaders such as Mohammad Natsir and Sjafruddin Prawiranegara were accused of complicity in the attacks by newspapers associated with the PKI or Sukarno's National Party of Indonesia (PNI). As the anti-Masyumi campaign intensified to include threatening telephone calls, without intervention from the Indonesian government, many of the party's leaders left for Sumatra, fearing for their lives. These included Burhanuddin Harahap and Sjafruddin in December 1957 and Natsir in January 1957.

Indonesian soldiers guarding the headquarters of the Koninklijke Paketvaart-Maatschappij after its seizure; amidst the anti-Dutch sentiment that followed the West New Guinea dispute and the Cikini Incident, Dutch-owned enterprises were seized by Indonesians.

As the assassination attempt had occurred shortly after the United Nations General Assembly failed to pass an Indonesian resolution related to its ongoing dispute with the Netherlands over West New Guinea, the Indonesian press linked it with the crisis. An editorial in the newspaper Suluh Indonesia, for instance, argued that the attack "strengthens the belief that the destructive elements want to annihilate the Republic of Indonesia", while Suara Merdeka, quoting an unidentified political observer, described the attack as part of a Dutch plot to destroy the republic. The day after the attack, the government banned Dutch-language publications and rescinded the Dutch airline KLM's landing rights. Within weeks, amidst a wave of anti-Dutch sentiment, Dutch-owned enterprises were seized by the PKI and PNI before falling under military control. Meanwhile, 46,000 Dutch citizens were expelled.

Immediately following the Cikini Incident, Indonesia stopped ongoing negotiations with dissident groups. In subsequent months, it changed its approach to handling dissidence, holding that compromise was no longer possible. When a group of military officers affiliated with the Revolutionary Government of the Republic of Indonesia (Pemerintah Revolusioner Republik Indonesia, PRRI) demanded Sukarno's resignation in 1958, the government responded by giving them dishonorable discharges and accusing them of complicity in rebellion and the assassination attempt. Masyumi and the Socialist Party of Indonesia were likewise banned in 1960 after being accused of supporting the PRRI. The government executed Sekarmadji Maridjan Kartosoewirjo, the leader of Darul Islam, in 1962; Sukarno wrote that memories of Cikini were on his mind as he signed Kartosoewirjo's death order.

The Cikini Incident was the first of several assassination attempts on Sukarno, which also included an aerial attack on Bogor Palace in 1960, a shooting during Eid ul-Adha prayers in Jakarta in 1962, and a grenade attack in Makassar in 1962. He remained president of Indonesia until 1967, formalizing his "Guided Democracy" concept in a 17 August 1959 speech and becoming increasingly authoritarian. According to the Australian biographer John D. Legge, Sukarno's continued survival of attempts against his life gave rise to a public belief that he was invulnerable.

After Indonesia found evidence that the United States' Central Intelligence Agency (CIA) had supported dissidents in Sumatra and Sulawesi, (Note: Indonesian forces shot down Allen Lawrence Pope, a pilot with the CIA-owned Civil Air Transport, on 18 May 1958 after he bombed a naval vessel, church, and market in Ambon in support of the Permesta rebellion. Pope carried with him several incriminating documents, including detailed accounts of previous bombing missions and US military identification papers, which allowed Indonesia to press the United States and its publicly neutral position (Blum 2003, pp. 101–102; Kahin & Kahin 1995, pp. 175–179).) it began to blame the agency for backing the attack. Sukarno continued to believe that the CIA sought his death into 1965, when he told White House aide Michael Forrestal that the agency was "out of control". In 1975, United States Senator Frank Church led an investigation into the CIA's alleged involvement in assassination attempts around the world; the final report indicated that the CIA had contemplated an attempt on Sukarno, and had an asset in the region, but provided no further details. Later-declassified documents showed that Richard M. Bissell Jr. testified that the CIA's plot involved Sukarno being enticed by a female asset and then immobilised. As of 2020, the agency has not confirmed involvement in the Cikini attack.

== Works cited ==
- "20 Under Arrest in Sukarno Plot". The Macon News. Macon, Georgia. 4 December 1957. p. 1.
- Adryamarthanino, Verelladevanka; Nailufar, Nibras Nada (27 August 2021). "Tragedi Cikini 1957, Upaya Pembunuhan Soekarno" [1957 Cikini Tragedy, Assassination Attempt on Soekarno]. Kompas (in Indonesian). Archived from the original on 25 August 2026.
- Amaruli, Rabith Jihan. "Peristiwa Cikini" [Cikini Incident]. Ensiklopedi Sejarah Indonesia (in Indonesian). Ministry of Education. Archived from the original on 27 August 2026.
- "Belum Diketahui Golongan jang Mengatjau" [Not Yet Known Which Group Sowed Chaos]. Pewarta Soerabaia (in Indonesian). Surabaya. 3 December 1957. p. 1.
- Blum, William (2003). Killing Hope: US Military and CIA Interventions Since World War II. London: Zed Books. ISBN 978-1-84277-369-7.
- Brackman, Arnold (1963). Indonesian Communism: A History. New York: Praeger. OCLC 1097530527.
- Chandra, Bobby (7 October 2015). "Tragedi Cikini: Skenario Gagal Membunuh Soekarno" [The Cikini Tragedy: A Failed Plan to Kill Soekarno]. Tempo (in Indonesian). Archived from the original on 25 August 2026.
- "Dari Granat di Cikini Sampai Bom..." Tempo. Vol. 14, no. 33. 13 October 1984. p. 14.
- "Death Penalty for Assassination Bid". The Age. Melbourne. 14 August 1958. p. 4.
- "Death Toll Rises to 10 in Attack on Sukarno; 137 Hurt; 2 Arrested". Democrat and Chronicle. Rochester, New York. 2 December 1957. p. 2.
- Dijk, C. van (1981). Rebellion under the Banner of Islam: The Darul Islam in Indonesia. Verhandelingen van het Koninklijk Instituut voor Taal-, Land- en Volkenkunde. Vol. 94. Leiden: Brill. ISBN 978-9024761722. JSTOR 10.1163/j.ctvbqs6vx. Archived from the original on 27 July 2026.
- "Dr. Sukarno Escapes Assassins; 7 Others Killed". The Age. Melbourne, Australia. 2 December 1957. p. 1.
- Fikri, Danar Trivasya (15 May 2023). "Kilas Balik Peristiwa Percobaan Pembunuhan Presiden Sukarno Oleh Pemberontak DI/TII 62 Tahun Lalu" [Flashback to the Assassination Attempt Against President Sukarno by DI/TII Rebels 62 Years Ago]. Tempo. Archived from the original on 20 September 2026.
- Fischer, Louis (1959). The Story of Indonesia. New York: Harper. OCLC 1151344331.
- "Grenades Kill 7, Sukarno Unhurt". The Journal Star. Peoria, Illinois. 1 December 1957. p. 1.
- "Execute Four Notices Urge". The Montreal Star. Montreal. 12 August 1958. p. 42.
- "Execution of 3 Asked". The Oregon Daily Journal. Portland, Oregon. 17 June 1958. p. 18.
- Hanna, Willard A. (17 August 2026). "Sukarno". Encyclopedia Britannica. Archived from the original on 23 August 2026.
- "Indonesia Arrests 60 in Plot to Kill Sukarno and Aides". The Buffalo News. Buffalo, New York. 24 December 1957. p. 2.
- "Indonesia: Time of the Assassin". Time. Vol. 70, no. 24. 9 December 1957. p. 32.
- "Indonesian President Escapes Assassination". Battle Creek Enquirer. Battle Creek, Michigan. 1 December 1957. p. 1, 2.
- "Jakarta Executes 3: Terrorists Who Tried to Kill Sukarno Are Shot". The New York Times. New York. 31 May 1960. p. 6.
- Kahin, Audrey (1999). Rebellion to Integration: West Sumatra and the Indonesian Polity, 1926–1998. Amsterdam: Amsterdam University Press. ISBN 978-90-5356-395-3.
- Kahin, Audrey; Kahin, George McTurnan (1995). Subversion as Foreign Policy: The Secret Eisenhower and Dulles Debacle in Indonesia. New York: The New Press. ISBN 978-1-56584-244-1.
- Kahin, George McTurnan (October 1993). "In Memoriam: Mohammad Natsir (1907–1903)". Indonesia. 56.
- Lararenjana, Edelweis (29 November 2021). "Tragedi Cikini 30 November, Upaya Pembunuhan Presiden Soekarno dalam Ledakan Granat" [The Cikini Tragedy of 30 November, Assassination Attempt on President Sukarno with Grenades]. Merdeka.com (in Indonesian). Archived from the original on 20 August 2022.
- "Latar Belakang Peristiwa Tjikini" [Background to the Cikini Incident]. Pewarta Soerabaia (in Indonesian). Surabaya. 27 December 1957. p. 1.
- Legge, John D. (1972). Sukarno: A Political Biography. London: Penguin Books. ISBN 978-0-7139-0244-0.
- Lewis, Reba (1963). Indonesia: Troubled Paradise. New York: David McKay. OCLC 301593.
- "Man Linked to Attempt on Sukarno". The Waco Times-Herald. Waco, Texas. 25 December 1957. p. 7.
- Maslan, M. Rizal (2 June 2024). "Isu CIA di Balik Tragedi Granat Cikini" [Claims that the CIA Was Behind the Cikini Grenade Tragedy]. Detik (in Indonesian). Archived from the original on 26 August 2026.
- McIntyre, Angus (2005). The Indonesian Presidency: The Shift from Personal Toward Constitutional Rule. Lanham, Maryland: Rowman & Littlefield. ISBN 978-1-4616-0465-5.
- Nadhirianto, Averio (2024). "Managing Disappointment: Regime Survival and the Normalization of Indonesia-United States Relations 1957-1958". Jurnal Asia Pacific Studies. 8 (2): 20–33. doi:10.33541/japs.v8i2.6088.
- Nugroho, Arifin Surya (2013). Tragedi Cikini: Percobaan Pembunuhan Presiden Sukarno [The Cikini Tragedy: Attempted Assassination on President Sukarno] (in Indonesian). Yogyakarta: Ombak. ISBN 978-602-258-013-3.
- O'Sullivan, James L. (1994) [2 January 1958]. "3. Memorandum of Conversation". In McMahon, Robert J. (ed.). Foreign Relations of the United States, 1958–1960, Indonesia. Vol. XVII. Washington: United States Government Printing Office. Archived from the original on 27 August 2026.
- Poulgrain, Greg (2020). JFK vs Allen Dulles: Battleground Indonesia. New York: Skyhorse Publishing. ISBN 978-1-5107-4480-6.
- Ricklefs, Merle Calvin (1981). A History of Modern Indonesia, c. 1300 to the Present. London: MacMillan. ISBN 978-0-333-24378-7.
- "Still Around, Sukarno Says". The Washington Daily News. Washington, D.C. 13 December 1957. p. 4.
- Sukarno; Adams, Cindy (1966). Sukarno; An Autobiography. Hong Kong: Gunung Agung. OCLC 2159630.
- "Sukarno Escapes Assassination Attempt; Rips Netherlands in Speech". Madera Tribune. Madera, California. 8 January 1962. p. 1.
- "Three to Die in Bomb Plot". The Montreal Star. Montreal. 13 August 1958. p. 31.
- Trenta, Luca (2024). The President's Kill List: Assassination and US Foreign Policy since 1945. Edinburgh: Edinburgh University Press. ISBN 978-1-3995-1951-9.
- "Wave of Arrests Follow Attempt on Life of Sukarno". Intelligencer Journal. Lancaster, Pennsylvania. 3 December 1957. p. 25.
- "Zulkifli Lubis". Tirto.id (in Indonesian). Archived from the original on 11 February 2021.
