= Zulkifli Lubis =

Indonesian military officer (1923–1993)

General Zulkifli Lubis
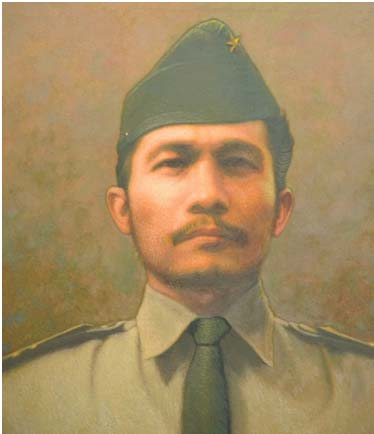

Acting Chief of Staff of the Indonesian Army
- In office 8 May 1955 – 26 June 1955
- Preceded by: Bambang Sugeng
- Succeeded by: Bambang Utoyo

1st Deputy Chief of Staff of the Indonesian Army
- In office 1 December 1953 – 8 May 1955
- Preceded by: office established
- Succeeded by: Gatot Soebroto

1st Director of the Indonesian State Intelligence Agency
- In office 1945–1958
- President: Sukarno
- Preceded by: office established
- Succeeded by: Pirngadi

Personal details
- Born: 26 December 1923 Banda Aceh, Dutch East Indies
- Died: 23 June 1993 (aged 69) Jakarta, Indonesia
- Relations: Aden Lubis (father); Siti Rewan Nasution (mother)
- Profession: Military officer

Military service
- Allegiance: Empire of Japan (1943–1945); Indonesia (1945–1961)
- Branch/service: Indonesian Army
- Years of service: 1943–1961
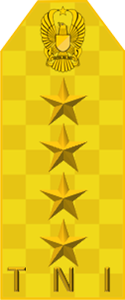
- Rank: General
- Unit: Infantry
- Battles/wars: Indonesian National Revolution

General Zulkifli Lubis (26 December 1923 – 23 June 1993) was Chief of Staff of the Indonesian Army from 8 May 1955 to 26 June 1955 and founder and first chairman of the first Intelligence Agency in Indonesia.

== Early life ==
Zulkifli was the fifth of ten children. His father was Aden Lubis, with the title of Sutan Srialam and his mother was Siti Rewan Nasution. Both of his parents were teachers at a Normaalschool.

Zulkifli Lubis enjoyed a Dutch education at the Hollandsch Inlansche School. After completing HIS, then Zulkifli continued to Meer Uitgebreid Lager Onderwijs (MULO). At that time Zulkifli Lubis began reading the Deli Blaad newspaper, which he obtained from a friend who was selling it. Through Deli Blaad, Zulkifli got to know the speeches of Sukarno, Hatta, Mohammad Husni Thamrin and debates in the Volksraad. At MULO, Zulkifli and his friends were members of a Patriot group. They conducted silent opposition to Dutch rule by not singing the Dutch anthem, Wilhelmus, during ceremonies and inviting other participants in the ceremony to not sing as well.

After graduating from MULO, Zulkifli continued to Algemeene Middlebare School B in Yogyakarta. At AMS B, Zulkifli and his friends often held national discussions, including people from Parindra.

== Japanese occupation period ==
When Japan occupied the Dutch East Indies, Zulkifli Lubis followed his friend's invitation to take part in youth training organized by the Japanese Army instead of being unemployed. After receiving about two months of training at the Seinen Kurensho (training center for youth ranks), Zulkifli received a special offer to receive military officer education at the Seinen Dojo (youth training center) Tangerang, with about 40 students from all over Java. Zulkifli Lubis, Kemal Idris and Daan Mogot were among the first batch and introduced Zulkifli to state intelligence.

Zulkifli was only there briefly, when he was transferred to Resentai (training corps) Bogor. Zulkifli Lubis' admiration for Japan subsided when he saw the conditions at the camp. Most of the instructors from the army were less professional and well kept. This differed from his time at Seinen Dojo, Tangerang, where the instructors thought more seriously and thoroughly. At Resentai Bogor, Zulkifli did not acquire sufficient military knowledge and skills, given that the education only lasted for 3 months.

In December 1943, the shodancho were appointed and then returned to their respective cities or regions of origin to participate in the formation of daidan (battalions). Second Lieutenants Zulkifli Lubis, Kemal Idris, Sabirin Mochtar, Satibi Darwis, Daan Mogot, Effendi, and Kusnowibowo helped Captain Tsuhiya Kiso to prepare for the formation of daidans on the island of Bali. Zulkifli Lubis, Kemal Idris and Daan Mogot were involved in a special team called Boei Giyugun Shidobu with the task of dealing with matters concerning the PETA battalions.

== Intelligence commander ==
In the middle of 1944, Zulikfli Lubis was invited by Rokugawa (former commander of the Seinen Dojo) to Malaysia and Japanese occupied Singapore. Zulkifli Lubis was the only Indonesian in Singapore to study state intelligence, with guidance from Rokugawa. Zulkifli and Rokugawa regularly reported to the Japanese commander for Southeast Asia in Singapore. Rokugawa taught Zulkifli on how to find out the number of residents in a city or know whether the people were anti-Japanese or pro-Japanese.

After studying intelligence abroad, Zulkifli returned to Indonesia, where he was involved in the Japanese plan to form intelligence groups in various places in Java as a guerrilla force to confront a potential Allied landing.

After the Japanese surrender, the Allies landed with little resistance from the intelligence group organized by Zulkifli Lubis. After the proclamation of independence, Zulkifli Lubis was entrusted by the central leadership of the People's Security Agency chaired by Kaprawi and assisted by Sutalaksana (Chairman I), Latief Hendraningrat (Chairman II), Arifin Abdurrachman and Machmud to begin preparations for the formation of an intelligence agency called the Badan Istimewa with, Sunarjo, Juwahir and GPH Djatikoesoemo, they formed the agency with about 40 former Giyūgun from around Java.

Zulkifli Lubis also formed the Penyelidikan Militer Chusus (PMC) at the end of 1945, with Sutopo Yuwono. PMC reported directly to President Sukarno. The agency sent expeditions to Sumatra, Kalimantan, Maluku and Nusa Tenggara and smuggled weapons from Singapore. This was carried out by the PMC in Sumatra, Kuala Enoch or Kuala Tungkal. The smuggling was also carried out to assist operations in Kalimantan under the leadership of Muljono and Tjilik Riwut.

In April 1946, the PMC branch in Purwakarta received fierce opposition from the army, because it was accused of carrying out a series of arbitrary arrests and seizures. These objections also appeared in other areas and led to the disbandment of the PMC by the People's Security Army Headquarters on 3 May 1946. Then a few months later, Zulkifli and Sutjipto (leader of the General Military Investigator) were involved in The 3 July 1946 incident, an attempted power struggle led by Major General Sudarsono, Head of Division III Yogyakarta. Sutjipto was caught, but Zulkifli Lubis managed to escape.

Zulkifli Lubis was able to cover his tracks after taking action and was granted a pardon from President Sukarno for his involvement in the 3 July 1946 Incident. Zulkifli Lubis was then entrusted with forming the Indonesian State Secret Service (Brani) and became its chairman. To recruit members to Brani and, Zulkifli used mostly students, from the former Seinen Dojo and Yugeki.

Defense Minister Amir Sjarifuddin formed his own intelligence agency, called Defense Agency B, headed by former police commissioner, Sukardiman. This agency produced reports and analysis on the conditions for successful intelligence operations. On 4 April 1946, Amir Sjarifuddin ordered Roebiono, a doctor at the Defense Agency B, to form a secret news agency, called the Dinas Code – later to become the National Code Agency.

For political consolidation, while serving as Prime Minister of Indonesia, Amir Sjarifuddin dissolved Defense Agency B and Brani, forming a new agency, Section V (KPV), on 30 April 1947 as coordinator of intelligence operations, directly under the Ministry of Defense.

As a result of the Renville Agreement, the Amir Sjarifuddin Cabinet fell in January 1948. KP V was dissolved, and the Army General Staff (SUAD) was formed. I SUAD became an intelligence organization. Lubis returned to being its leader and concurrently head of the Java Command Headquarters (MBKD-I).

== Military career ==
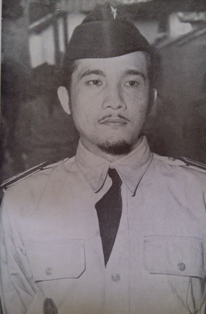
Colonel Zulkifli Lubis as acting Chief of Staff of the Indonesian Army

After 17 October affair, an internal conflict within the Army, Zulkifli was appointed Deputy Army Chief of Staff (Wakasad) by Indonesian Minister of Defense, Iwa Kusumasumantri, in December 1953, accompanying Bambang Sugeng. After Bambang Sugeng resigned in mid 1955 he was appointed as Chief of Staff of the Indonesian Army. Due to the large number of votes against him, because he was considered pro-Western, he was replaced by Bambang Utoyo.

After the Cikini Incident on 30 November 1957, Zulkifli Lubis was accused of being one of the masterminds, Zulkifli Lubis denied the accusation. Instead, he recommended peaceful action against the terrorists, Ismail and Saleh Ibrahim. Both were part of Islamic groups that formed a network of Zulkifli Lubis' cells. At the time of the incident, Zulkifli Lubis was not at the scene of the crime, he was with Colonel Prajitno in Cideng, but the army began hunting for Zulkifli Lubis.

Zulkifli Lubis moved to Sumatra, where he joined the Revolutionary Government of the Republic of Indonesia (PRRI) in around 1958. Zukifli had sympathies for the officers in the regions, and wanted to oppose the central government, Afterwards, Zulkifli Lubis became a fugitive until the fall of Sukarno.

Zulkifli died in Jakarta on 23 June 1993, at the age of 69 and was buried at Dreded Heroes Cemetery, Bogor, West Java.
