= Burning of Bekasi =

1945 punitive expedition and arson

- Part of the Indonesian National Revolution
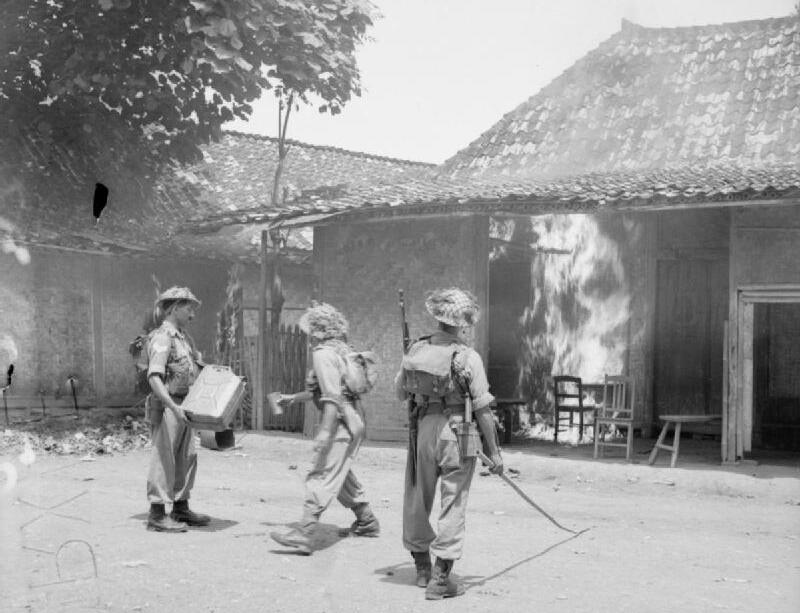
- Men of the Bengal Sappers and Miners burn down a house in Bekasi.
Date	29 November – 13 December 1945
Location	Bekasi, West Java 6°14′06″S 106°59′32″E
Result	British victory

Belligerents
United Kingdom	Indonesia

Commanders and leaders
Philip Christison	Noer Alie

Units involved
16th Punjab Regiment	People's Security Army; Hizbullah; Barisan Banteng Hitam

Casualties and losses
1 wounded	30 killed, 15 captured (Hizbullah); "all" (Barisan Banteng Hitam)

The burning of Bekasi by British Indian forces took place during the Indonesian National Revolution on 13 December 1945, as retaliation for the killing of passengers of a crashed British aircraft in late November. The 16th Punjab Regiment was sent as a punitive expedition, and after some fighting against nationalist militias captured and burned the city of Bekasi.

== Background ==
In the aftermath of the surrender of Japan and the proclamation of Indonesian independence in August 1945, nationalist-aligned militias began to form in the countryside around Jakarta in the forming power vacuum, and these militias often effectively controlled the areas they operated in. Two of these groups were the Hizbullah and the Barisan Banteng Hitam (Black Bull Front). Despite ragtag leadership (often led by colonial-era local bandits) and mutual suspicion, these groups generally cooperated to some extent to resist Allied forces returning to Indonesia.

Allied forces, primarily British, had begun arriving in Jakarta in September 1945, and initially enjoyed a good working relationship with Indonesian Republican leaders who did not consider the British forces a threat to Indonesian independence. However, the situation quickly deteriorated as British forces began to clash with local youths and militias in Jakarta, and worsened even further as the Dutch colonial army KNIL was reactivated. By 10 November, British forces in Surabaya had been drawn into an open battle with Indonesian nationalists. To reduce tensions with the British, Indonesian Prime Minister Sutan Sjahrir ordered the Republican government's People's Security Army (TKR) and nationalist militia to withdraw from Jakarta proper on 19 November.

== Events ==
=== Dakota crash ===
On 23 November, a Dakota transport plane carrying 20 troops of the 2nd Battalion, 19th Hyderabad Regiment crashed near the town of Bekasi (pop. around 10,000), east of Jakarta. The passengers and crew of the aircraft initially survived the crash, but when British recovery forces of the 5th Mahratta Light Infantry reached the crash site the day after, they found the aircraft burned out and only one mutilated body of an Indian passenger. British forces commander in Jakarta Philip Christison issued an ultimatum demanding the return of the passengers and crew to Jakarta within 24 hours.

According to the accounts of Indonesian general Abdul Haris Nasution, there were 26 passengers and crew on board the Dakota aircraft. They were surrounded by curious onlookers from surrounding villages, and fired warning shots, causing the locals to mob and capture them. The survivors were then handed over to a local militia, who transferred them over to the local TKR. Nasution stated that the survivors were executed during transit without any orders from TKR. The killings were attributed to members of the Barisan Banteng Hitam, on 26 or 27 November.

=== Battle of Sasak Kapuk ===
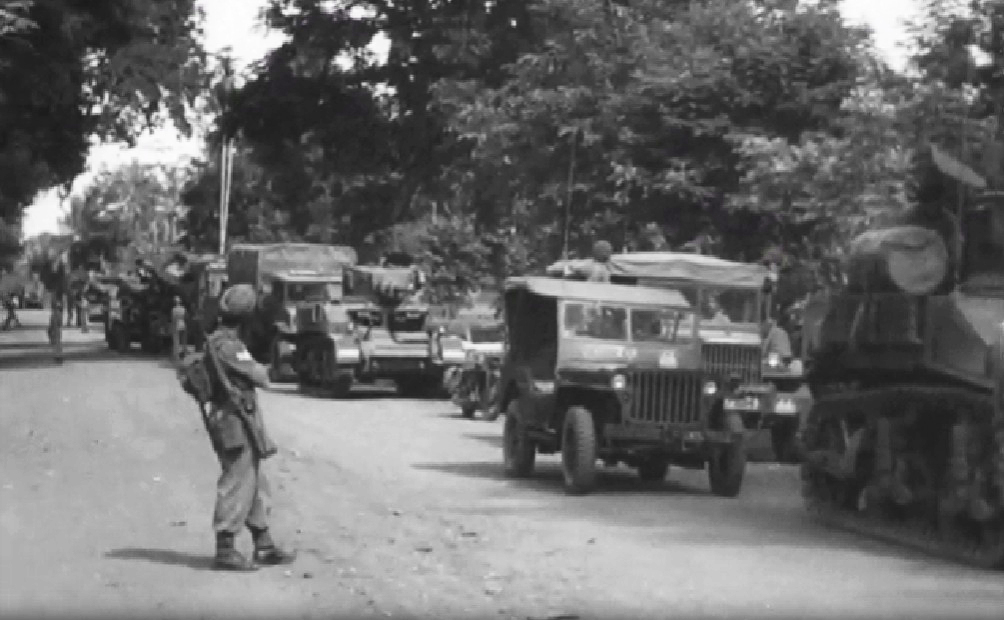
A convoy of the 16th Punjab Regiment near Bekasi

In another recovery attempt on 29 November, a larger group of British forces departed for Bekasi, mainly troops of the 16th Punjab Regiment supported by tanks. They were resisted by the Hizbullah militia of around 100 men led by Noer Alie, supported by some elements of the TKR in Bekasi. Some of the militiamen were armed with rifles, others carrying swords (golok) and sharpened bamboo. In an engagement at the Sasak Kapuk Bridge, 30 militiamen were killed, 20 wounded, and 15 were captured. The British casualties was a single Indian soldier wounded.

Upon reaching Bekasi (Indonesian accounts noted that the British arrived in Bekasi on another attempt in 9 or 10 December), the column engaged with the Barisan Banteng Hitam, which "made a stand but all were killed". Bodies of the Dakota's passengers and crew would be discovered buried by a river after the search party was tipped off by a released Ambonese prisoner. Around 200 houses in villages near the crash site were also burned down by British forces.

=== Burning ===
After learning of the executions of the passengers and crew, Christison ordered that Bekasi be burned down. A punitive expedition was sent on 13 December 1945, with British De Havilland Mosquito aircraft and 25-pounder guns bombarding the town after dawn. Civilians and TKR forces in Bekasi had largely evacuated before the British attack. The British also conducted searches of the town, seizing caches of arms and ammunition. In total, around 600 houses were burned down on 13 December. Before leaving Bekasi, British forces planted mines and booby traps at some government buildings, which were disarmed by TKR forces upon their return to Bekasi.

According to historian Richard McMillan, the Chinese neighborhoods of Bekasi were largely spared from destruction, but this was denied by Chinese–Indonesian eyewitnesses.

== Aftermath ==
Christison's actions received condemnation by several Western newspapers and by Indonesian Prime Minister Sjahrir. His superior officer, Lord Mountbatten, was "dismayed" by the incident, and regretted that he was not informed of the affair before Bekasi's burning. Mountbatten later noted in his accounts that "although reprisals would no doubt take place [...] retaliation must not be taken in cold blood", describing the Barisan as "terrorists".

A monument in Bekasi, decorated by hand grenades, spent artillery shells, and bullet casings, commemorates the incident. The incident has been compared to the Bandung Sea of Fire (deliberate burning of Bandung in 1946 as a scorched earth strategy by the Indonesian military), and has been referred to as the "Bekasi Sea of Fire" (Indonesian: Bekasi Lautan Api).
