= Hizbullah (Indonesia) =

20th-century Indonesian Islamic army

- 回教青年挺身隊; Kaikyō Seinen Teishintai (Tentara Sukarela) Pemuda Islam
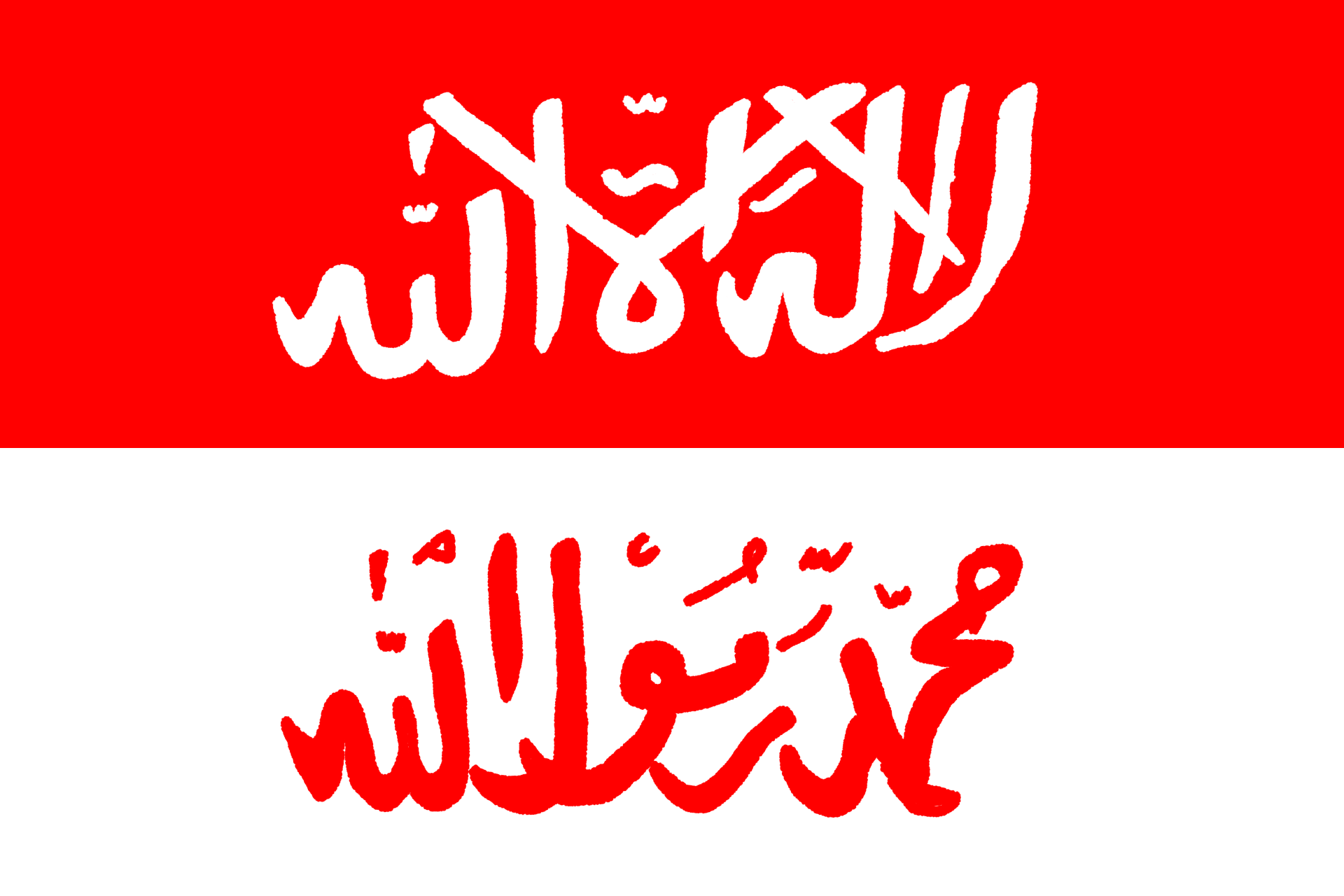
- One version of the Banner (panji) used by Hizbullah
- Active: 8 December 1944 – 1947
- Country: Dutch East Indies and Indonesia
- Allegiance: Masyumi Party
- Type: Infantry
- Role: Reserve force for the Defenders of the Homeland in defending the Japanese-occupied Dutch East Indies from Allied invasion and as a Paramilitary force
- Size: ≈ 25,000 men (in 1945)
- Garrison/HQ: Cibarusah, Bekasi Regency, West Java
- Nickname: Sabilillah
- Colors: Green, Red, & White
- March: Mars Hisbullah
- Anniversaries: 8 December
- Engagements: Indonesian National Revolution: Bandung Sea of Fire; Battle of Semarang; Battle of Ambarawa; Battle of Surabaya; Burning of Bekasi

Commanders
- Chairman of the Leadership Center: Zainul Arifin
- Deputy Chairman of the Leadership Center: Mohamad Roem
- Training Commander: Mas Mansoer
- Deputy Training Commander: Prawoto Mangkusasmito
- Chief Supervisor: Motoshige Yanagawa

Hizbullah (Old Spelling: Hizboellah or Hisboellah, Arabic: حزب الله, lit. 'Party of God'), also known as Laskar Hizbullah, was an Indonesian rebel paramilitary organization that was active during the Indonesian National Revolution. Hizbullah was formed on 8 December 1944 by the Japanese occupation government under the name of Kaikyō Seinen Teishintai (Japanese: 回教青年挺身隊; 'Islamic Youth Volunteer Force'). Hizbullah was established as a reserve force for the Defenders of the Homeland (PETA) with members consisting of Muslim youths. Unlike PETA, which was under the command of the Imperial Japanese Army, Hizbullah's command lay with the Masyumi Party. Therefore, Hizbullah was not disbanded like PETA when Japan surrendered to the Allies in August 1945. After the Indonesian proclamation of independence, Hizbullah fought to defend the sovereignty of the newly established Indonesia alongside the military and other laskar's, until the entire Indonesian armed forces were merged into the Indonesian Army in 1947.

== Formation ==
The formation of Hizbullah began when Indonesian leaders and communities began to voice aspirations about the formation of a military unit with Indonesian members. On 13 September 1943, a request for the formation of a military unit was also proposed by ten scholars: K.H. Mas Mansyur, K.H. Adnan, Dr Abdul Malik Karim Amrullah, Teacher H. Mansur, Teacher H. Cholid, K.H. Abdul Madjid, Teacher H. Jacob, K.H. Djunaedi, U. Mochtar, and H. Mohammad Sadri, who demanded the immediate establishment of a voluntary, non-conscript army that would defend Java. This army was planned to be composed of Muslims and organised according to Islamic provisions. The proposal for the formation of this military unit was realised with the establishment of PETA on 3 October 1943, but PETA was not a special unit for Muslims. On 25 February 1944, there was a rebellion in Singaparna among the santri led by K.H. Zaenal Mustafa. This rebellion made Japan begin to soften its attitude towards Islamic groups. Finally, on 8 December 1944, Hizbullah was established by the Japanese military government as an army consisting of Muslim youths, with the function of being a reserve force for PETA. Although inaugurated by the Japanese, the command of the Hizbullah forces was under the coordination of the Masyumi Party.

Between December 1944 and January 1945, a Leadership Centre for Barisan Hizbullah was established to prepare for recruitment and the opening of training centres. The board was chaired by Zainul Arifin with Mohamad Roem as deputy, while training affairs were commanded by K.H. Mas Mansyur with Prawoto Mangkusasmito as deputy under the supervision of Motoshige Yanagawa of Beppan (a special task force of the 16th Army). The training of members began on 28 February 1945 at the training centre located in Cibarusa, Bogor (now part of Bekasi Regency). The first batch of 500 trainees came from various pesantren in Java and Madura. Graduates of this training were then returned to their home areas to form Hizbullah units made up of local youth. During the first year of its establishment, it is estimated that Hizbullah totalled around 25,000 personnel.

== Era of National Revolution ==
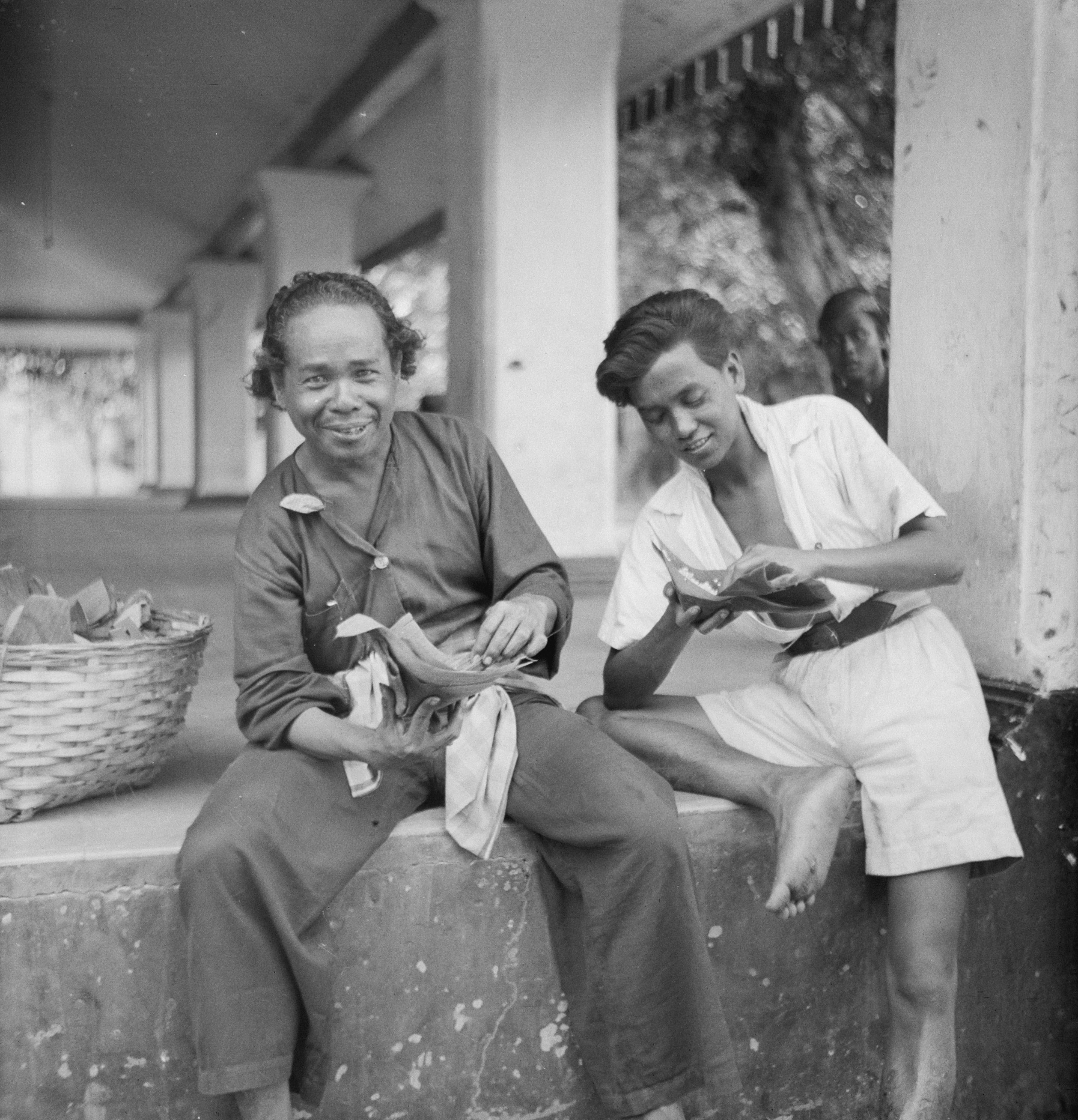
Two TNI personnel from Hizbullah eating at the evacuation center in Bangil, 1948

After Japan surrendered to the Allies, PETA as an army established by the Japanese military government was disbanded. Hizbullah, which was under the direction of the Masyumi Party, was not affected by this, so its activities continued into the era of the independent Indonesian government. Hizbullah went on to fight in various battles alongside the People's Security Agency (and later formations) and other laskar or people's struggle bodies during the Indonesian National Revolution.

In the early days of the revolution, various Hizbullah units in various regions helped disarm the Japanese army to arm themselves. This often led to clashes with the Japanese army. Some of the major battles attended by Hizbullah personnel included Bandung Sea of Fire, the Five Day Battle, the Battle of Ambarawa, and the Battle of Surabaya.

Hizbullah's activities as an independent force were completed when on 3 June 1947, President Sukarno announced the formation of the Indonesian National Army (TNI). The TNI was formed by combining the formal military forces of the Indonesian Republican Army (TRI) with the people's armies, including Hizbullah.

== Notable people ==
Several figures in Indonesian history who have served in Hizbullah include:

- Ahmad Hanafiah (Founder)
- Zainul Arifin
- Mohammad Roem
- Mas Mansoer
- Anwar Musaddad
- Prawoto Mangkusasmito
- Noer Alie (Chairman of Hizbullah Headquarters in Greater Jakarta Area)
- Sangidi Mahyudin (Commander of Hizbullah Kedu Division)
- Muhammad Nurdin Nasution (Commander of Medan Area Hizbullah Battalion)
- Duski Samad (Chairman of Hizbullah in Central Sumatra)
- Buya H. Abdul Malik Ahmad (Hizbullah Pioneer of Central Sumatra)
- Hasnawi Karim (Chief of Staff of Hizbullah Central Sumatra Division)
- Arsyad Thalib Lubis (Deputy Commander of Hizbullah East Sumatra)
- Muslich (Commander of Hizbullah Banyumas Division)
- Abdul Wahab Hasbullah (Commander of Laskar Mujahidin)
- Dimyathi Syafi'i (Komandan Hizbullah Blambangan Selatan)
- Amir Fatah (Commander of Hizbullah Besuki)
- Ali Moertopo (Member)
