= Noer Alie =

Indonesian Islamic leader and educator

Kiai Haji Noer Alie
- نور علي
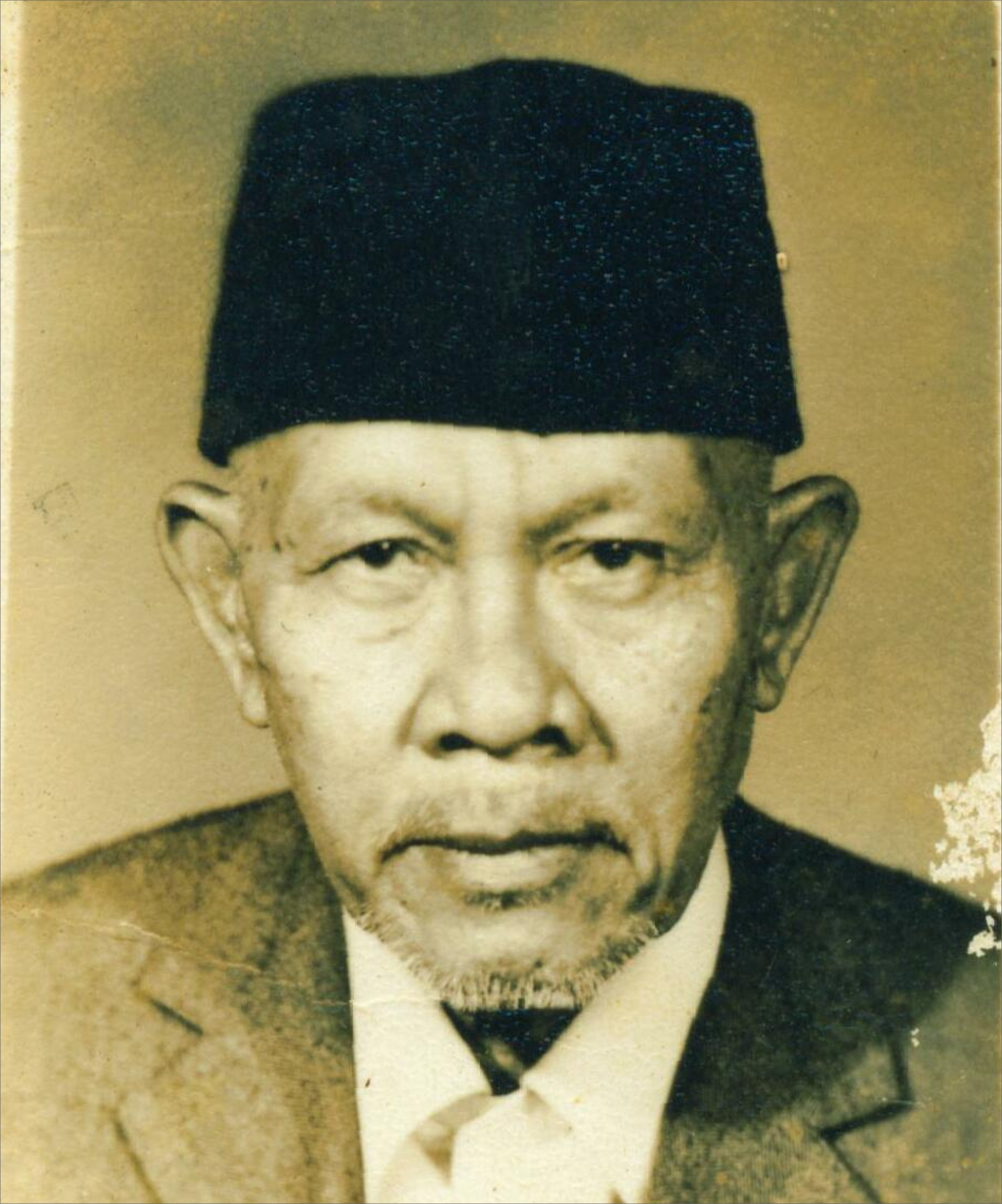

Member of Konstituante
- In office May 13, 1957 – July 5, 1959
- President: Sukarno
- Chairman of Konstituante: Wilopo
- Preceded by: Sjafruddin Prawiranegara
- Constituency: West Java

Vice Speaker of Bekasi Regency House of Representatives
- In office 1950–1956
- President: Sukarno

Personal details
- Born: 15 July 1914 Babelan, Dutch East Indies
- Died: January 29, 1992 (aged 77) Bekasi, West Java, Indonesia
- Party: Masyumi
- Occupation: Preacher; Teacher
- Profession: Ulama; Politician

Kiai Haji Noer Alie (EYD: Nur Alie, also spelt as Noer Ali; 15 July 1914 – 29 January 1992) was a Betawi Islamic preacher and educator, he is regarded as a National Hero of Indonesia.

== Early life ==
Noer Alie was born in the village of Ujung Malang in Babelan, Meester Cornelis Regency, Dutch East Indies, now located in modern day Bekasi, to Anwar bin Layu and Maimunah binti Tarbin. He was the fourth child of his ten siblings. From a young age, Noer Alie was known to be a diligent and smart student, being able to recite many Qur'an surahs and studied Arabic and fiqh at the age of eight.

In 1934, Noer Alie went to Mecca to perform hajj (pilgrimage) and further study Islam, he stayed in Mecca for six years. During his stay in Mecca in 1937, he met with other Indonesian students and formed the Betawi Students Association (PBB) with him as the leader.

In 1939, Noer Alie returned to his village. A year after, he married Siti Rohmah bint Mughni and later founded a local pesantren (Indonesian Islamic boarding school) which later became known as Pesantren At-Taqwa.

In 1942, the ruling Japanese government asked him to work with them through a Thai colleague he met during his stay in Mecca, which he firmly rejected, not wanting his students to be divided because they were reluctant to compromise with the Japanese.

== Indonesian National Revolution ==
After Indonesia declared independence, Noer Alie was appointed to be the leader of the Regional Indonesian National Committee of Babelan District. During the national revolution in 1945, he formed the Laskar Rakyat (The People's Warrior) in collaboration with the Bekasi-Jatinegara People's Security Army to mobilise pesantren students and Muslim youths to take part in military training in Teluk Puncung in the fight against the Netherlands.

Under Hizbullah, Noer Alie alongside Angkut Abu Gozali formed the Bekasi Hizbullah Forces in Tanjung Karekok, Cikampek.

On 29 November 1945, British troops entered Bekasi with tanks and armoured fighting vehicles, burning villages as they proceeded, local Bekasi militias who had heard about the attacks went into strategic positions, preparing to attack them through guerilla warfare. At 10:00 AM, British troops surrounded Bekasi and attacked from every side, on the western side of the fighting, Bekasi Hizbollah forces under the command of Noer Alie sabotaged British tanks by blowing up a bridge using dynamite, throwing grenades inside tanks, and stabbing ventilation holes using sharpened bamboo. An hour after, the better equipped British forces cornered Noer Alie and his forces to the Sasak Kapuk bridge, Pondok Ungu, they fired mortars and cannons, Noer Alie commanded his troops to retreat, while most followed his command, dozens stayed and fought back the British. Thirty Bekasi Hizbullah forces died as a result.
