= Darul Islam (Indonesia) =

Islamist group in Indonesia

Darul Islam/ Islamic Armed Forces of Indonesia
- Darul Islam/Tentara Islam Indonesia دار الإسلام إندونيسيا; Dārul Islām Indūnisiyyā
- Flag of the Islamic State of Indonesia from 1949 to 1962; Flag of modern groupuscules claiming to be historical Darul Islam; Emblem
- Leaders: Sekarmadji Maridjan Kartosuwiryo (Imam of the rebellion); Daud Beureu'eh; Amir Fatah; Abdul Kahar Muzakkar; Present: Unknown
- Dates active: 1948–1962; 2022–present (underground Movement)
- Active regions: Aceh; Central Java (some parts were taken in West Java); South Sulawesi; South Kalimantan; Present: Jakarta; Banten; West Java; Bali; Sulawesi; Maluku; West Sumatra
- Ideology: Islamism
- Status: Banned and designated as a terrorist organization by Indonesia
- Size: 1,400+ (2022)
- Wars: DI/TII rebellion

Darul Islam (lit. meaning House of Islam), also known as Darul Islam/Islamic Armed Forces of Indonesia (Indonesian: Darul Islam/Tentara Islam Indonesia, DI/TII), or Islamic State of Indonesia was an Islamist group whose goal was to fight for the establishment of an Islamic state in Indonesia. It was established in 1942 by a group of Muslim militias, coordinated by the Muslim politician, Sekarmadji Maridjan Kartosoewirjo. The group recognises only Shari'a as the valid source of law. The movement has produced splinters and offshoots that range from Jemaah Islamiyah to non-violent religious groups.

== Establishment ==
During the Indonesian National Revolution, Kartosoewirjo founded his own band of fighters in West Java, called Hizbullah and Sabilillah. As a protest toward the Renville Agreement signed by Indonesian leaders in 1948, which ceded West Java to the Dutch, Kartosoewirjo created the Majelis Islam Pusat (Central Islamic Council) in areas around Tasikmalaya in May 1948. A Darul Islam (meaning "Islamic State") was proclaimed in West Java on 7 August 1949. Darul Islam did not disband itself after the transfer of sovereignty in 1949, resulting in a clash with the government of the Indonesian Republic. Rebels in South Sulawesi led by army deserter Abdul Kahar Muzakkar joined the Darul Islam Movement in 1951. On 20 September 1953, Daud Beureu'eh declared that Aceh was part of the "Islamic State of Indonesia" (Negara Islam Indonesia) under the leadership of Kartosoewirjo.

The movement flourished in the 1950s due to chronic instability within the central government during the Liberal Democracy Era. In 1957, it was estimated that the Darul Islam controlled one-third of West Java and more than 90% of South Sulawesi and Aceh provinces where the government only controlled the cities and towns. The movement had 15,000 armed guerillas operating under the banner of Tentara Islam Indonesia (Indonesian Islamic Army). In that year, Darul Islam agents unsuccessfully attempted to assassinate Sukarno by throwing grenades at him during a school function in Cikini, Central Jakarta.

== Proclamation of Islamic State of Indonesia ==
=== Original text ===
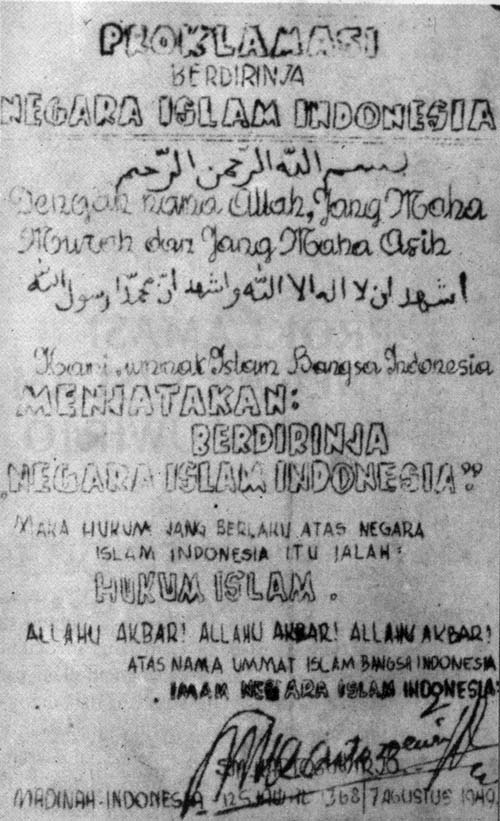
Original text of the proclamation.

بسم الله الرحمن الرحيم
Dengan nama Allah Yang Maha Murah dan Yang Maha Asih
أَشْهَدُ أَنْ لَا إِلَٰهَ إِلَّا ٱللَّٰهُ وَأَشْهَدُ أَنَّ مُحَمَّدًا رَسُولُ ٱللَّٰهِ

Kami, ummat Islam Bangsa Indonesia

MENJATAKAN:

Berdirinja ”NEGARA ISLAM INDONESIA”

Maka hukum jang berlaku atas

Negara Islam Indonesia itu, ialah:

HUKUM ISLAM

Allahu Akbar! Allahu Akbar! Allahu Akbar!

Atas nama Ummat Islam Bangsa Indonesia

IMAM NEGARA ISLAM INDONESIA

(SM. KARTOSUWIRJO)

MADINAH-INDONESIA 12 SYAWAL 1368|7 AGUSTUS 1949

=== Translation ===
In the name of Allah, the Most Gracious, the Most Merciful

I bear witness that there is no deity but Allah, and I bear witness that Muhammad is the messenger of Allah

We, the Muslims of Indonesia

HEREBY DECLARE:

The establishment of the "ISLAMIC STATE OF INDONESIA"

Therefore, the law in effect in

the Islamic state of Indonesia is:

ISLAMIC LAW

God is great! God is great! God is great!

In the name of the Muslims of Indonesia

IMAM OF THE ISLAMIC STATE OF INDONESIA

(SM. KARTOSUWIRJO)

MADINAH-INDONESIA 12 SHAWWAL 1368|7 AUGUST 1949

== Crackdown ==
The implementation of martial law in 1957, followed by declaration of Guided Democracy by Sukarno in 1959, marked the reversal of fortunes for Darul Islam. Smaller Darul Islam bands operating in Central Java under Amir Fatah were crushed by Colonel Ahmad Yani's Banteng Raiders in 1954–1957. Darul Islam forces in South Kalimantan under Ibnu Hadjar were forced to surrender in 1959. Amir Fatah was killed in 1954, while Ibnu Hadjar was eventually executed in 1962.

Three years of negotiations (1959–1962) led to a peace agreement that ended the conflict in Aceh, in which Aceh was restored as an autonomous province with special rights for Islamic law. Introduction of effective "fence-of-legs" method of encircling rebel mountain hideouts in 1959 succeeded in breaking the strong rebel grip over West Java's rural areas. On 4 June 1962, Kartosoewirjo was captured on his hideout of Mount Geber near Garut. In captivity, Kartosoewirjo issued order for all his followers to surrender, after which he was quickly tried and executed. The last Darul Islam band in West Java surrendered in August 1962. Successive military operations also crushed the Darul Islam in South Sulawesi. In February 1965, its leader Kahar Muzakkar was killed in a military ambush in the interior of Southeast Sulawesi province, ending the Darul Islam insurgency in Indonesia.

However, despite the group being dismantled, underground networks have persisted. In the 1970s and 1980s, there were occurrences of 'Islamic' terrorism attributed to a group known as Komando Jihad. The leaders arrested from this group were found to be Darul Islam veterans.

== Underground movement ==
According to the director of the National Counter Terrorism Agency brigadier general of police Ahmad Nurwakhid, Darul Islam is carrying out underground movements and recruitment.

Until May 2022, Detachment 88 had arrested more than 20 members of Darul Islam Indonesia and Detachment 88 revealed that members of Darul Islam Indonesia in West Sumatera had planned various low-level terror attacks using machetes and campaigns to overthrow the government with a time limit of 2024. On the other hand, observers note that the Darul Islam Indonesia threat is too exaggerated because its cells are currently too small and uncoordinated to inflict a significant attack on the government. Although Darul Islam Indonesia existence is temporarily shrouded in the shadows of Jemaah Islamiyah and Jamaah Ansharut Daulah, the police report that their activities are continuing. Currently, Darul Islam Indonesia has cells in seven regions, including Jakarta, Banten, West Java, Bali, Sulawesi, Maluku, and West Sumatra each of which operates in a “structured and systematic” manner in carrying out a four-step recruitment system to check and indoctrinate sympathizers. In West Sumatera alone, the system reportedly recruited more than 1,125 members of Darul Islam Indonesia of which 400 were active members and the rest were part of its inactive cells.

== See also ==
- Darul Islam rebellion
- Mujahedeen KOMPAK
- Free Aceh Movement
