= Sekarmadji Maridjan Kartosoewirjo =

Imam of the Islamic State of Indonesia (1905–1962)

Sekarmaji Marijan Kartosoewirjo
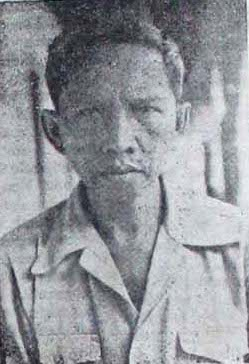
- Kartosoewirjo, c. 1950

Imam of the Islamic State of Indonesia
- In office 7 August 1949 – 4 June 1962
- Preceded by: position created
- Succeeded by: position abolished

Personal details
- Born: 7 January 1905 Cepu, Dutch East Indies
- Died: 5 September 1962 (age 57) Kepulauan Seribu, Jakarta, Indonesia
- Cause of death: Execution by firing squad
- Spouse: Dewi Siti Kalsum

Sekarmadji Maridjan Kartosoewirjo or Sekarmaji Marijan Kartosuwiryo (7 January 1905 – 5 September 1962) was an Indonesian Islamic mystic who led the Darul Islam rebellion against the Indonesian government from 1949 to 1962, intending to overthrow the Pancasila ideology and establish Negara Islam Indonesia (Islamic State of Indonesia) based on sharia law.

== Early life ==
Kartosoewirjo was born in Cepu, an oil-producing town in Central Java, the son of a minor government official. His education was mostly in secular and Dutch-medium schools. While attending NIAS (Nederlands-Indische Artsen School/ Netherlands Indies Medical College) in Surabaya, Kartosoewirjo boarded at the house of Islamist leader Tjokroaminoto and became actively involved in Tjokrominoto's PSII (Partai Sarekat Islam Indonesia/ Indonesian Islamic Union Party). Kartosuwiryo abandoned his medical studies to be fully immersed in politics.

While touring Malangbong, near Garut in West Java, Kartosoewirjo met and married the daughter of a local PSII leader. He settled down in this area, where he established a madrasa. In 1937, he resigned from PSII to establish his political movement advocating a future Islamic State of Indonesia based on Islamic law.

== Leading the Darul Islam ==
During the Japanese occupation of the Dutch East Indies (1942–1945), Kartosoewirjo established armed militias in the Garut area, one of many such groups supported and armed by the Japanese to help them resist any future Allied invasion. During the Indonesian National Revolution, his Darul Islam militia remained on amicable terms with the secular Republican forces until the latter withdrew from West Java according to the terms of the Renville Agreement in 1948, while Kartosoewirjo continued the guerrilla struggle against the occupying Dutch forces. After the second Dutch offensive (Operation Kraai) in December 1948, Republican guerrillas slipping back into West Java were attacked by Kartosoewirjo's militia, resulting in a triangular war between the Republican forces, Darul Islam, and the Dutch army.

On 7 August 1949, he declared the establishment of Negara Islam Indonesia (Indonesian Islamic State) with himself as Imam. After the transfer of sovereignty from the Dutch, Kartosuwiryo refused to acknowledge returning Republican authority and continued attacking returning Republican forces, culminating in a full-blown insurgency.

During the 1950s, a weak central government and uncoordinated military response from the government allowed Darul Islam to flourish, controlling one-third of West Java and even launching raids as far as the outskirts of Jakarta. Islamic rebels in South Sulawesi and Aceh joined Darul Islam and acknowledged Kartosoewirjo as their highest authority though in practice there was little coordination between the rebels in the different provinces. In 1957, agents sent by Kartosoewirjo unsuccessfully attempted to assassinate President Sukarno with a grenade attack during a primary school function at Cikini, Central Jakarta.

== Defeat and death ==
The declaration of martial law in 1957 and the establishment of Guided Democracy by Sukarno in 1959 proved to be a turning point for Darul Islam's fortunes. The military introduced the effective "fence of legs" method to encircle the guerrillas' mountain bases and cut off their supply and escape routes, forcing the rebels to surrender or face annihilation in the face of superior firepower. Kartosoewirjo responded by declaring "total war" in 1961, in which Darul Islam guerrillas increasingly used terror tactics and banditry against civilians, further alienating the population. He also sent agents to Jakarta, where in May 1962 they made another unsuccessful assassination attempt on Sukarno during the Eid al-Adha prayers.

In June 1962, Kartosoewirjo was eventually captured in his hideout at Mount Geber near Garut. In captivity, he issued orders for his followers to surrender. The last Darul Islam band in West Java, operating at Mount Ciremai, surrendered in August 1962. Kartosoewirjo was brought to Jakarta, where he was tried by military court-martial. He was found guilty of rebellion and attempted assassination of the president, and was sentenced to death. He was executed by firing squad on 5 September 1962.
