= 3 Nafas Likas =

- Movie poster
- Directed by: Rako Prijanto
- Written by: Titien Wattimena
- Produced by: Riahna Djamin Gintings; Reza Hidayat
- Starring: Atiqah Hasiholan; Vino G. Bastian; Tutie Kirana; Marissa Anita; Mario Irwinsyah; Arswendi Nasution; Ernest Samudra; Tissa Biani Azzahra; Anneke Jodi
- Cinematography: Hani Pradigya
- Music by: Aghi Narottama
- Production company: Oreima Films
- Distributed by: Oreima Films
- Release date: October 16, 2014
- Countries: Indonesia; Canada
- Languages: Indonesian; Karo

3 Nafas Likas is an Indonesian drama film produced by Oreima Films and directed by Rako Prijanto, based on a script by Titien Watimena. The film stars Atiqah Hasiholan, Vino G. Bastian, Tutie Kirana, Marissa Anita,Mario Irwinsyah, Tissa Biani Azzahra, and Jajang C. Noer. It is based on the true story of Likas Tarigan, who later became known as Likas Gintings, wife of Let. Jend. Djamin Gintings.

== Cast ==
- Atiqah Hasiholan as Likas Tarigan/Likas Ginting
- Vino G. Bastian as Djamin Ginting
- Tutie Kirana as Old Likas
- Marissa Anita as Hilda
- Mario Irwinsyah as Mulia
- Arswendi Nasution as Ngantari Tarigan
- Jajang C. Noer as Tembun Tarigan
- Ernest Samudra as Njore
- Tissa Biani Azzahra as Little Likas
- Anneke Jodi as Uni Mayar

== Production ==
Rako Prijanto, Titien Wattimena, and producer Reza Hidayat began development of the film in December 2013. Research was conducted in Karo as to the customs, culture, and food of the region. The film covers a wide time period, the 1930s to the present.

Open casting took place for some of the roles. On April 20, 2014, Kastria Soldiana Elizabeth Hutagaol (finalist of 2013 Wajah Femina) was chosen as one of the child characters.

== Filming process ==
3 Nafas Likas began filming on April 26, 2014, and took approximately two months. Filming took place on location in North Sumatra, Bakkara (Humbang Hasundutan Regency), Dolok Sanggul (Humbang Hasundutan Regency), Berastagi, Kabanjahe, Tebing Tinggi, Pamah Semilir, and the city of Medan. Other filming locations are Jakarta and Ottawa, Ontario, Canada.

One of the children of Djamin Gintings-Likas Gintings, Riahna Djamin Gintings, was an executive producer for this film.

== Soundtrack ==
Tulus provided two songs for the soundtrack: a cover of "Untuk Ku" by Chrisye and an original song, entitled "Lekas".

== Awards and nominations ==
| Year | Awards | Category | Recipients | Result |
|---|---|---|---|---|
| 2014 | Indonesian Film Festival | Best Film | 3 Nafas Likas | Nominated |
| 2014 | Indonesian Film Festival | Best Director | Rako Prijanto | Nominated |
| 2014 | Indonesian Film Festival | Best Leading Actor | Vino G. Bastian | Nominated |
| 2014 | Indonesian Film Festival | Best Leading Actress | Atiqah Hasiholan | Nominated |
| 2014 | Indonesian Film Festival | Best Supporting Actress | Jajang C. Noer | Nominated |
| 2014 | Indonesian Film Festival | Best Adaptation Screenwriter | Titien Wattimena | Nominated |
| 2014 | Indonesian Film Festival | Best Cinematography | Hani Pradigya | Nominated |
| 2014 | Indonesian Film Festival | Best Artistic Director | Frans X.R. Paat | Nominated |
| 2014 | Indonesian Film Festival | Best Visual Effect | Raiyan Laksamana | Nominated |
| 2014 | Indonesian Film Festival | Best Costume Design | Gemailla Ghea Geretiana | Nominated |
| 2014 | Indonesian Film Festival | 2014 FFI Special Award for Best Children Role | Tissa Biani Azzahra | Won |
| 2014 | Maya Awards | Best Feature Film | 3 Nafas Likas | Nominated |
| 2014 | Maya Awards | Best Director | Rako Prijanto | Nominated |
| 2014 | Maya Awards | Best Actor in a Leading Role | Vino G. Bastian | Nominated |
| 2014 | Maya Awards | Best Actress in a Leading Role | Atiqah Hasiholan | Nominated |
| 2014 | Maya Awards | Best Actress in a Supporting Role | Jajang C. Noer | Nominated |
| 2014 | Maya Awards | Best Young Performer | Tissa Biani Azzahra | Nominated |
| 2014 | Maya Awards | Best Adapted Screenplay | Titien Wattimena | Nominated |
| 2014 | Maya Awards | Best Theme Song | Tulus – "Lekas" (3 Nafas Likas) | Nominated |
| 2014 | Maya Awards | Best Poster Design | John Hollywood | Nominated |
| 2014 | Maya Awards | Best Special Effects | Raiyan Laksamana | Nominated |
| 2014 | Maya Awards | Best Makeup & Hairstyling | Gunawan Sarigih & Chaery Eka Wirawan | Nominated |
| 2014 | Maya Awards | Best Costume Design | Gemailla Ghea Geretiana | Won |
| 2014 | Maya Awards | Best Sound Design | Khikmawan Santosa & M Ikhsan Sungkar | Nominated |
| 2014 | Maya Awards | Best Art Direction | Frans X.R. Paat | Won |
| 2014 | Maya Awards | Best Cinematography | Hani Pradigya | Nominated |
| 2014 | Maya Awards | Best Film Review | Haris Fadli, for "Memberi Hidup Luar Biasa Untuk Sosok Yang Biasa" | Won |
| 2015 | Indonesian Movie Awards | Best Actress | Atiqah Hasiholan | Nominated |
| 2015 | Indonesian Movie Awards | Best Children Role | Tissa Biani Azzahra | Won |
| 2015 | Indonesian Movie Awards | Best Supporting Actress | Jajang C. Noer | Nominated |
| 2015 | Indonesian Movie Awards | Favorite Actress | Atiqah Hasiholan | Nominated |
| 2015 | Indonesian Movie Awards | Favorite Movie | 3 Nafas Likas | Nominated |
