= Mariono Reksoprodjo =

Indonesian surgeon and military officer

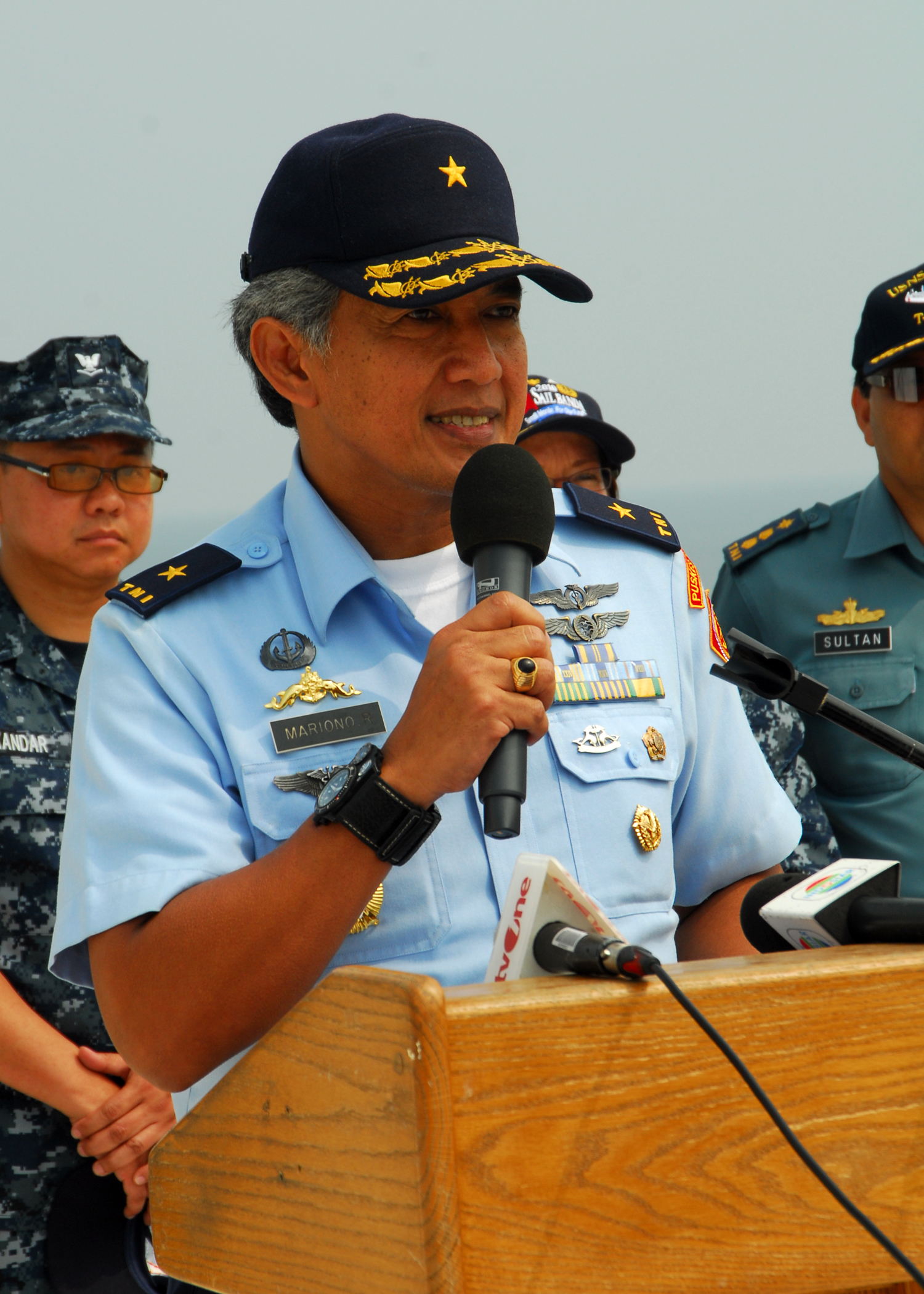
- Born: 9 January 1954 (age 72)
- Military career
- Branch: Air Force
- Service years: 1979 – 2012
- Rank: Air vice-marshal
- Service number: 505496
- Unit: Health
- Commands: Surgeon General of the Air Force; Surgeon General of the Armed Forces

Mariono Reksoprodjo (born 9 January 1954) is an Indonesian physician and a retired air force officer who has served as the air force surgeon general from February to May 2010 and the armed forces surgeon general from May 2010 to January 2012. Mariono specializes in obstetrics and gynaecology as well as aviation medicine.

== Early life and education ==
Mariono was born on 9 January 1954 as the son of R.P. Soedarsono and Mariah Soedarsono. He graduated from the Medical Faculty of the University of Indonesia in 1979. He received his license as a gynecologist in 1987 and as an aviation doctor in 2004.

== Military career ==
After graduating from university, Mariono applied as a military doctor and started his service at the Pattimura Airbase in Biak, Papua. Afterwards, he was transferred to Adisumarmo Airbase as a general practitioner, then to Halim Perdanakusuma Hospital as a medical officer, and then to the M. Salamun Air Force Hospital, where he became the head of the obstetrics clinic in the hospital. He moved to Jakarta after several months and became the commander of the medical task force in the air force headquarters.

Following a stint in the air force health directorate and the 1st Air Force Operations Command, Mariono was put as the head of the Saryanto Aviation and Space Health Institute, an institute that was established to check the well-being of Indonesian air force aviators. After two years heading the institute, Mariono became the air force surgeon general from 25 February 2010 until 27 May 2010. During his very short tenure, Mariono became an honorary member of the Paskhas in April 2010.

Mariono served as the surgeon general of the armed forces from 9 June 2010 to 13 January 2012. He retired from the military on 29 July 2012. Upon his retirement, Mariono became the dean of medicine at the Jakarta Veteran's National Development University.

== Military rank ==
Insignia	Rank	Date
	First lieutenant	26 May 1979
	Captain	1 April 1983
	Major	1 October 1991
	Lieutenant colonel	1 October 1995
	Colonel	1 October 1999
	Air first marshal	13 November 2007
	Air vice marshal	20 July 2010

== Awards ==

	Grand Meritorious Military Order Star, 2nd Class (13 February 2013)	
Grand Meritorious Military Order Star, 3rd Class (5 July 2012)	Air Force Meritorious Service Star, 2nd Class (4 January 2012)	Air Force Meritorious Service Star, 3rd Class
Medal for Longtime Service in the Military, 1st Class	Medal for Longtime Service in the Military, 2nd Class	Medal for Longtime Service in the Military, 3rd Class
unknown	unknown	Medal for Service as a Military Educator
