= PRRI =

PRRI may refer to:

- Public Religion Research Institute, an education and research organization based in Washington, D.C.
- Revolutionary Government of the Republic of Indonesia (Indonesian: Pemerintah Revolusioner Republik Indonesia), an alternative government established in Sumatra to oppose the Indonesian national government
