= Likas (disambiguation) =

Likas is a sub-district in the city of Kota Kinabalu, Malaysia.

Likas may also refer to:

- Likas Tarigan (1924–2016), Indonesian politician and teacher
- Harry Likas (1924–2017), American tennis player
- Likas Stadium, Likas, Kota Kinabalu
