= Ahmad Husein =

Indonesian military officer

Ahmed Husein
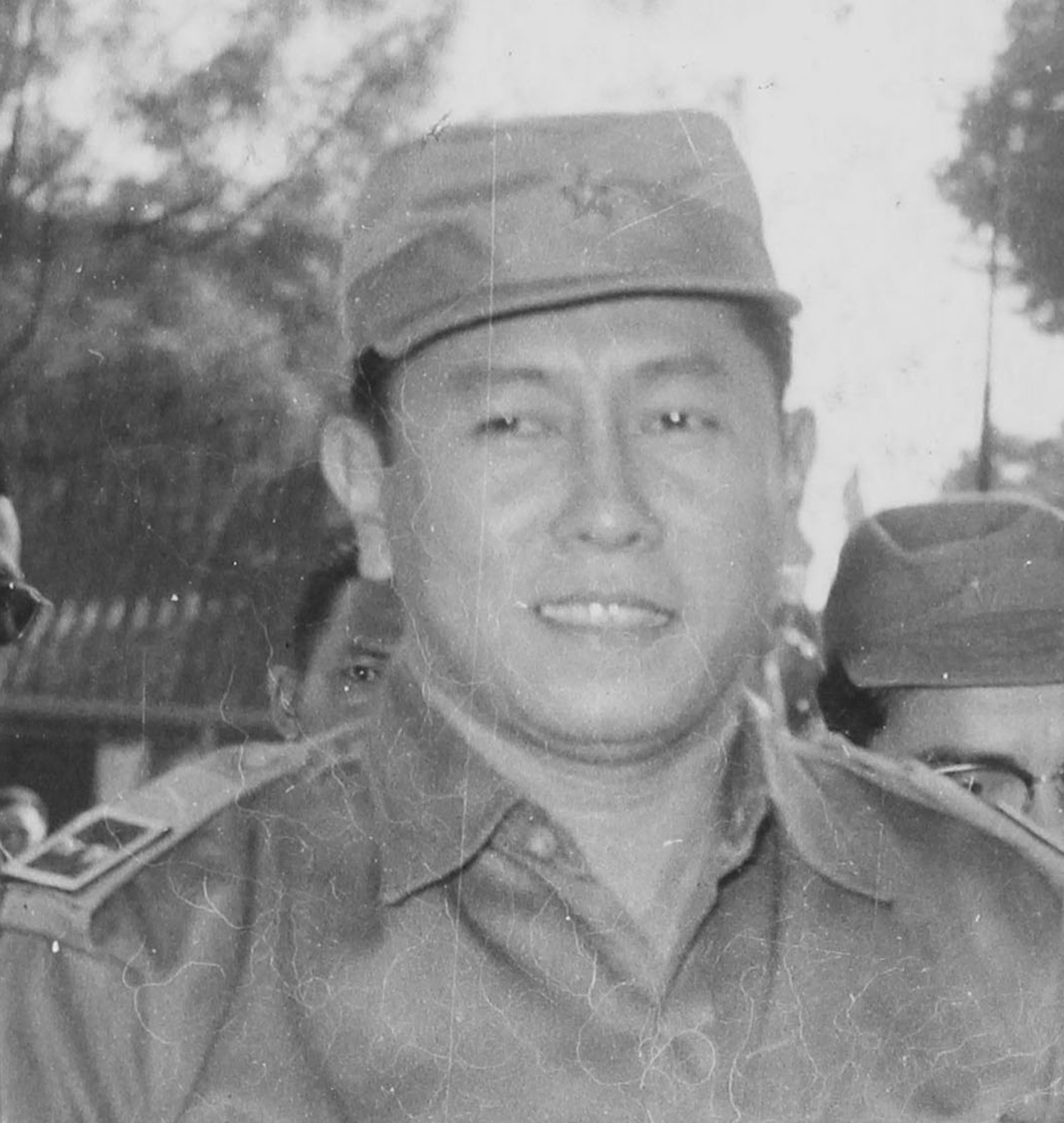

Personal details
- Born: April 1, 1925 (Netherlands) Padang, West Sumatra, Dutch East Indies
- Died: November 28, 1998 (aged 73) (Indonesia) Jakarta
- Children: Donny A. Husein
- Parent(s): Abdoel Kahar (father); Sa'adiyah (mother)
- Occupation: Military officer
- Known for: leading the PRRI

Military service
- Allegiance: (Empire of Japan) (1942—1945); (Indonesia) (1945—1961)
- Branch/service: Indonesian Army
- Years of service: 1942—1961
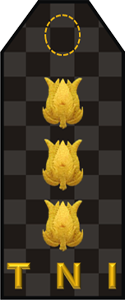
- Rank: Colonel
- Battles/wars: Indonesian national revolution: Battle of Padang Area; PRRI rebellion (POW)

Colonel Ahmed Husein (1 April 1925 – 28 November 1998) was an Indonesian independence fighter and military leader of the PRRI. Forming the Revolutionary Government of the Republic of Indonesia (PRRI) 15, 1958, in Padang under the leadership of Syafruddin Prawiranegara.

== Early life ==
Ahmed Husein was born in Padang on April 1, 1925, to Abdoel Kahar, a pharmacy owner, at the Padang military hospital. Ahmad has eleven siblings (7 boys, 4 girls). He attended Hollandsch-Inlandsche School Padang and graduated in 1938. After that he studied at Taman Siswa in Bukittinggi and graduated in 1941. In 1943, following the Japanese occupation of the Dutch East Indies, Ahmad Husein enrolled in Giyugun, a native volunteer force.

Prior to Japan's surrender in the Pacific War, Ahmed became a member of the People's Security Agency (BKR) in Padang, actively recruiting people into the BKR. Ahmad became the combat commander of the Padang Area, which became known as the Kuranji Tiger.

During the Indonesian war of independence his unit was reorganized into the Banteng Division, where he faced Dutch forces during the first and second Dutch police action. He met Sukarno during a visit to Bukittinggi, where he was disappointed in the Java focused development of the central government.

== Banteng Council ==
The Banteng Council was created by Colonel Ismail Lengah on 20 December 1956, Headquartered in Medan.

Ahmad Husein was Commander of 4th regiment of the Bukit Barisan Territorial Command when he became commander of the Banteng Council and governor of Central Sumatra.

== Commander of the PRRI ==
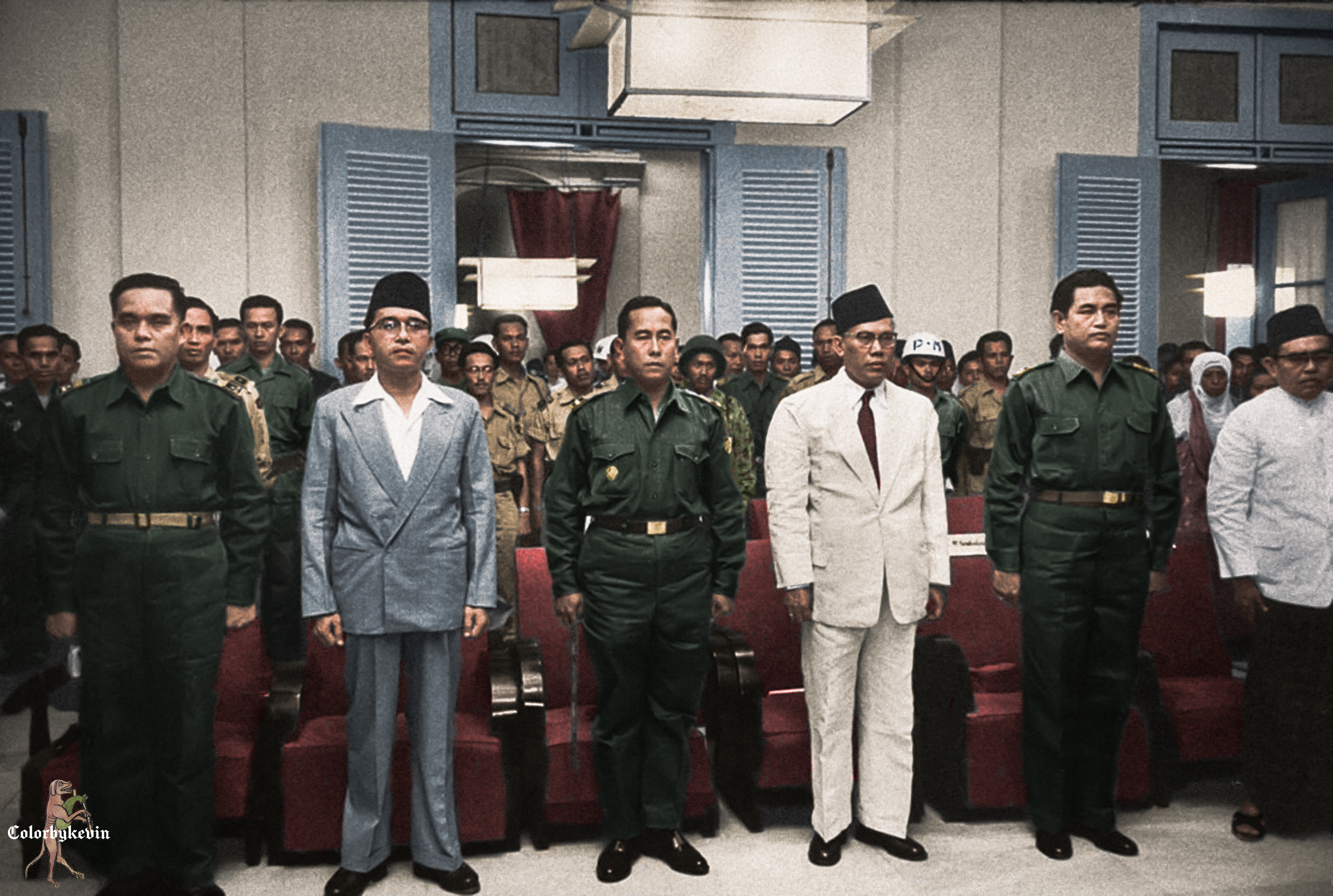
Ahmad Husein (centre) with other members of the PRRI. March 01, 1958.

On 9 January 1958, after a meeting in Dharmasraya Regency, Ahmad Husein's Banteng Council, Maludin Simbolon's Elephant Council, Barlian's Garuda Council and Ventje Sumual's Manguni Council banded together to form the Revolutionary Government of the Republic of Indonesia (PRRI), a rival government to the Java-based Central government of president Sukarno and prime minister Djuanda Kartawidjaja, where Ahmad Husein was chosen as commander.

He led the PRRI in an alliance with D.J. Somba's Permesta until its downfall in 1961, when he was captured by government forces, and incarcerated until the fall of Sukarno in 1965.

== Death ==
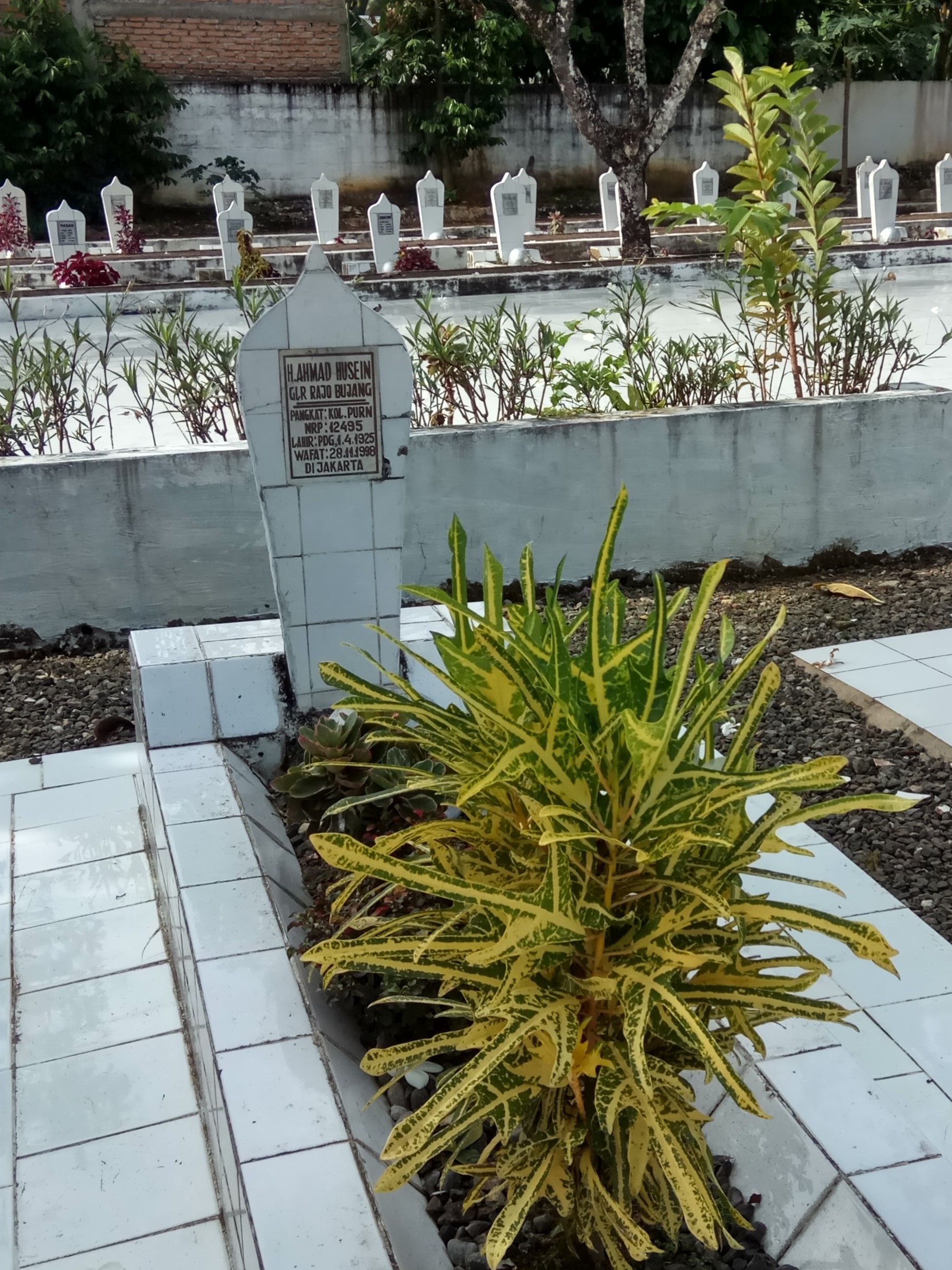
Ahmad Husein's grave

Ahmad Husein died in Jakarta on 28 November 1998, and was buried in his hometown of Padang, at the Kuranji Heroes Cemetery.
