= Djamin Ginting =

Indonesian diplomat

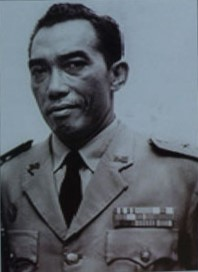

Personal details
- Born: 12 January 1921 Suka, Tigapana, Karo Regency, Dutch East Indies
- Died: 23 October 1974 (aged 53) Ottawa, Canada
- Party: Golkar
- Spouse: Likas Tarigan
- Children: Riemenda J. Ginting; Riahna J. Ginting; Sertamin J. Ginting; Serianna J. Ginting; Enderia Pengarapen J. Ginting
- Awards: National Hero of Indonesia

Military service
- Allegiance: Empire of Japan (1943–1945); Indonesia (1945–1968)
- Branch/service: Indonesian Army
- Years of service: 1943–1968
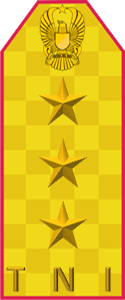
- Rank: Lieutenant General
- Battles/wars: Indonesian National Revolution; Battle of Medan; Darul Islam rebellion; PRRI rebellion; Operation Trikora

Lieutenant General Djamin Ginting (12 January 1921 – 23 October 1974), was an Indonesian military officer and independence fighter from Tanah Karo. He was appointed a National Hero of Indonesia by President Joko Widodo on 7 November 2014.

== Early life ==
Djamin Ginting was born in the village of Suka, Tigapanah, Karo Regency. After completing high school he joined PETA, a military unit organized by Japanese officers. Djamin Ginting gained the rank of Commander.

== Military career ==
Japanese plans to use local troops to strengthen Japanese forces collapsed after Japan surrendered to the Allies in World War II. Japan abandoned their territory in Asia and withdrew back to Japan. As a commander, Djamin Ginting moved quickly to consolidate his forces, convincing his members not to return to their respective villages and pleaded for their willingness to defend and protect the Karo people from Dutch and British forces who wanted to reassert control over Sumatra.

During the Indonesian Revolution troops under his Command joined Indonesian forces under the People's Security Agency (BKR) and eventually People's Security Army (TKR) being part of TKR A, based in Kabanjahe with a command area in East Sumatra. In TKR A, he became Commander of Battalion II TKR Kabanjahe and later Deputy Chief of Staff of Division IV TKR East Sumatra in Medan. Fighting in the Battle of Medan, he was promoted to the Commander of Battalion I Regiment II of the TRI (Republic of Indonesia Armed Forces) in Tanjungbalai and also selected as Chairman of the Regional Struggle Bureau XXXIX East Sumatra.

Djamin Ginting was tasked with escorting vice president Mohammad Hatta from Berastagi to Bukittinggi. Djamin fought Dutch forces in a guerrilla war in the countryside as they firmly held the cities. Djamin was forced out of North Sumatra under the Renville agreement to Kutacane, Central Aceh Regency, where he continued to raid and harass Dutch military posts and convoys until the war ended After the Dutch–Indonesian Round Table Conference.

After the war Djamin Ginting's troops emerged as forerunners of Kodam I/Bukit Barisan. Where Lt. Col. Djamin Ginting became the deputy commander of Kodam I/Bukit Barisan fighting against Darul Islam forces led by Daud Beureu’eh in Aceh. He had disagreements with Colonel Maludin Simbolon, Commander of Kodam I/Bukit Barisan. Djamin disagreed with Colonel Simbolon's actions to demand from the central government through armed struggle. Simbolon felt that Sumatra had been neglected by the central government economically, while Ginting wanted to defend the Indonesian state.

During a rebellion under Major Boyke Nainggolanan, loyal to the PRRI movement at Medan, North Sumatra, Djamin Ginting launched Operation Bukit Barisan, on 7 April 1958. Forcing, troops under Mayor Boyke Nainggolan and Captain Sinta Pohan to retreat to Tapanuli. When Colonel Simbolon joined the PRRI, Djamin Ginting was promoted to commander of Kodam I/Bukit Barisan. He was later brought to Jakarta on 28 June 1962 to prepare the Indonesian Air Force during Operation Trikora.

During the aftermath of the 30th September Movement coup, Djamin Ginting was brought back from a post in Aceh and became inspector general of the Indonesian Army.

== Later life and death ==
Djamin Ginting was later assigned as ambassador of Indonesia to Canada in Ottawa, where he died on 23 October 1974 of high blood pressure
