= Anneke Jodi =

Indonesian actress

- Born: Anneke Titi Hapsari Jodi; 22 August 1985 (age 40); Manado, North Sumatera, Indonesia
- Occupation: Actress
- Years active: 2003–present
- Spouse: Spencer Jeremiah (m. 2017)

Anneke Titi Hapsari Jodi (born 22 August 1985), better known as Anneke Jodi, is an Indonesian actress, best known for her television and film work. Anneke is the daughter of Jodi Sulistyoadi Soesilo and Dyah Sukaning Tyas. Anneke has received several awards including the Revlon 2001 Youth Runner-up.

== Career ==
Anne's early career began when she was invited by her mother to John Casablanca Modelling. Started from there, Anne got an offer of an agency model in Jakarta. Her career is developing. After often become a model fashion in Majalah Remaja, Anne expanded the art world the role. Her first Soap Opera is Kisah Adinda, where she played as Adinda. Other Soap Operas are Primadona, Gatot Kaca, Gol, and Intan. She ever star advertisement Waisan, Pond's, Fresh & Natural, dan BNI. In 2007, she also had starred in the soap opera Intan. In that soap opera, she roled as Rosa.

== Personal life ==
Anneke marries Spencer Jeremiah on July 1, 2017, in Uluwatu, Bali.

== Filmography ==
=== Film ===
Year	Title	Role	Information
2011	Tebus	Sulis	
2014	3 Nafas Likas	Uni Mayar	
2015	Miracle: Jatuh dari Surga	Eli	

=== Television ===
Year	Title	Role	Information
2004	Kisah Adinda	Adinda	30 episode
2004-2006	Hikmah 3	Rita	
2005	Primadona	Prima and Dona	
2005	Ande Ande Lumut	Chandra Kirana	7 episode
2005	Gol		
2005	Gatot Kaca		13 episode
2006	Bunga Malam		26 episode
2006-2007	Intan	Rosa	
2007	Ghost		Episode Jalangkung
2007	Mawar	Mawar's Friend	
2007	Fajar	Cinta	
2007	Anak Si Pitung		
2007	Soleha		
2007	Roman Picisan		
2007-2008	Rubiah		
2009	Cinta Indah	Indah	121 episode
2009	Tangisan Issabela		
2010-2011	Arini	Arini	
2011	Arini 2	Arini	
2011	Janji Cinta Aisha	Aisha	27 episode
2011	Mutiara Cinta dari Bromo	Tiara	Television Movie
2011	I Left My Love in Kebon Jeruk		Television Movie
2011	Pacarku Tukang Tambal Ban	Anya	Television Movie
2013	Ibuku Paksa Aku Dimadu		Television Movie
2013	Sahabat Gak Setia	Desy	Television Movie
2014	Cantik Tailor		Television Movie SineLove
2014	Picture of You	Cindy	Television Movie
2016	Aku Harus Kuat Hadapi Ini Semua	Rahma	Television Movie
2016	Aku Salah Menentang Suamiku	Elma	Television Movie
2016	Nenek yang Pantang Menyerah	Wita	Television Movie
2016	Anugerah yang Teraniaya		Television Movie Cermin Kehidupan
