= Bravo Detachment 90 =

Indonesian Air Force special forces

- Satuan Bravo 90
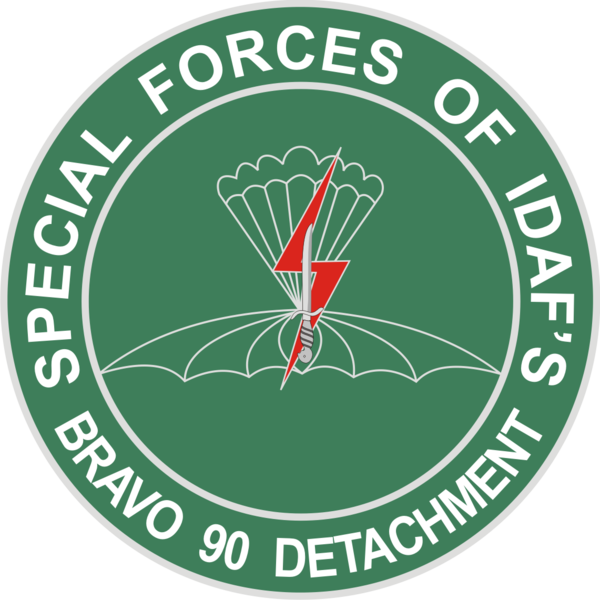
- Active: 16 September 1990 – present
- Country: Indonesia
- Branch: Kopasgat
- Type: Special forces
- Role: Counter-Terrorism; Hostage rescue Special operations
- Part of: Indonesian National Armed Forces
- Garrison/HQ: Rumpin Air Force Base, Bogor, West Java

The Bravo Detachment 90 is a counter-terrorism unit whose personnel are specialists recruited and chosen from the Indonesian Air Force's Kopasgat. It is the youngest special operations unit of the Indonesian Air Force.

The unit specialises in hostage rescue involving hijacked aircraft.

In April 2008, the Sultan of Brunei, Hassanal Bolkiah, was made an honorary member of the unit.

In August 2021, Bravo Detachment 90 was deployed to Afghanistan in order to evacuate Indonesian citizens.

In March 2022, Bravo Detachment 90 was deployed to Ukraine to evacuate Indonesian citizens.

== History ==
Initially, there were 34 personnel in Bravo: 1 commanding officer, 3 group commanders, and 30 troops. No information has been released about this unit from its limited formation until the end of the 1990s. In this vacuum, it is believed that its members were assigned into Kopaskhasaus Demonstration and Training Unit (Satdemolat). It was only on 9 September 1999 that the special forces detachment was formally established.

Bravo's personnel are recruited from the best graduates of Kopasgat training in the Air Force. About 5 to 10 Kopasgat graduates are recruited for this elite unit each year. To train in its anti-terror techniques, the unit also trains at the Army's Sat-81 Gultor (Kopassus) GMF facility and aeroplane hostage rescue trainings, Marines' Denjaka facility for off-shore airfields infiltration and attack trainings, Navy's KOPASKA facility for underwater demolition trainings, Indonesian Police's Gegana Detachment facility for anti-bomb unit trainings and with the British Special Air Service Regiment for direct action, counter-terrorism, special intelligence and HALO/HAHO skills.
