= Korpasgat =

Special forces unit of the Indonesian Air Force

Quick Reaction Forces Corps
- Korps Pasukan Gerak Cepat (Korpasgat)
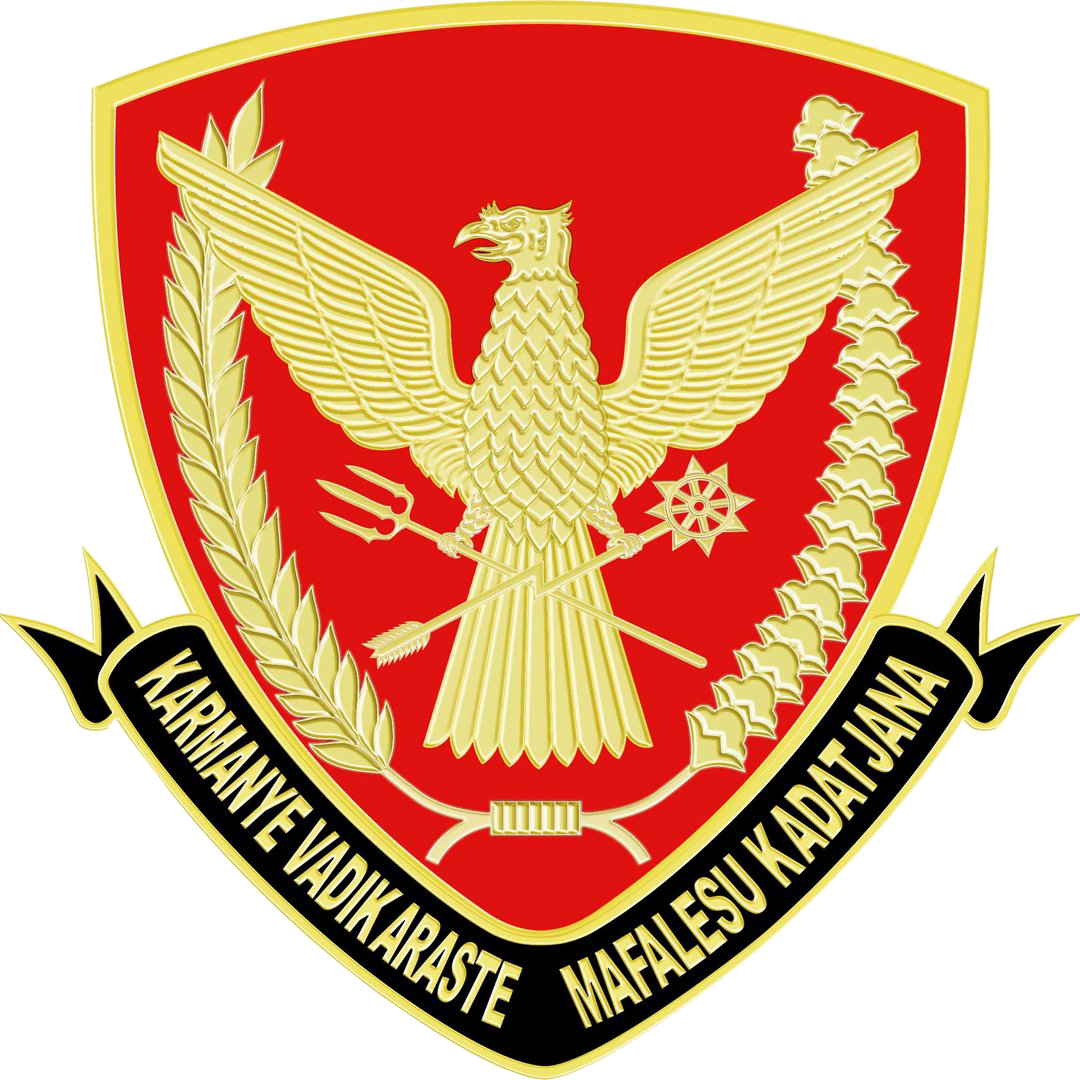
- Korpasgat Corps Insignia
- Active: 17 October 1947 – present
- Country: Indonesia
- Branch: Indonesian Air Force
- Type: Air Force Infantry And Special Forces
- Size: Classified
- Garrison/HQ: Margahayu, Bandung
- Nicknames: Baret Jingga (Orange Berets), Hantu Udara (Ghost of the Skies)
- Mottos: Karmanye Vadikaraste Mafalesu Kadatjana ("Working without counting gains and losses"), Bhagavad Gita 2:47
- Beret colour: Orange
- March: Prajurit Baret Jingga / Ksatria Jingga (Mars PASGAT); Baret Jingga Perisai Bangsa (Himne PASGAT)
- Engagements: Indonesian National Revolution; Darul Islam rebellion; RMS rebellion; PRRI-Permesta rebellion; Operation Trikora; Indonesia–Malaysia confrontation; Operation Seroja; Papua conflict; Insurgency in Aceh; Maluku sectarian conflict; Operation Tinombala; 2020 evacuation from Wuhan; 2021 evacuation from Afghanistan; 2022 evacuation from Ukraine; 2023 evacuation from Sudan; 2023 evacuation and airdrop aid in Gaza
- Website: kopasgat.tni-au.mil.id

Commanders
- Commander: Air Marshal Deny Muis
- Deputy Commander: Air Vice Marshal Anis Nurwahyudi

Insignia
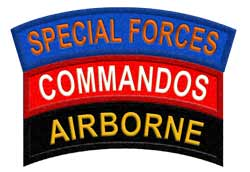
- Right shoulder patch

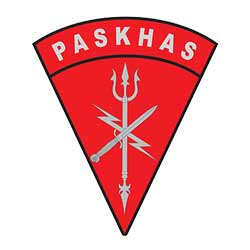
- Right shoulder patch

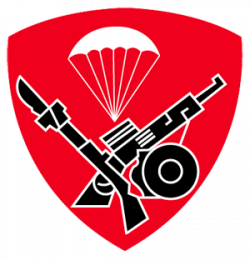
- Left shoulder patch

The Korpasgat (Indonesian: Korps Pasukan Gerak Cepat, lit. 'Quick Reaction Forces Corps') is the air force infantry and special forces corps of the Indonesian Air Force. The corps is also known as the Orange Berets (Baret Jingga in Indonesian) from the colour of their service headgear. Korpasgat is trained to seize and defend airfields from enemy forces known as Operasi Pembentukan dan Pengoperasian Pangkalan Udara Depan (OP 3 UD) (Frontline Air Base Establishment and Management Operation), airborne operations, and other specific military operations within the scope of the Indonesian Air Force.

Korpasgat is tasked with carrying out the objectives and defense of the strategic objects of the Air Force, air defense, special operations and other typical military operations under the policies of the commander of the National Armed Forces. Korpasgat has air-oriented combat abilities, such as combat-control team, airfield control and defense, combat search and rescue, jumpmaster, airborne, ground-forward air control and high-altitude military parachuting. They also can operate as Air Traffic Controllers (ATC) in certain situations.

Korpasgat has a special unit tasked for conducting special operations such as responding to aircraft hijackings and other specific missions tasked to the corps, the unit is known as the Bravo Detachment 90 (Satbravo 90).

== History ==
The history of Korpasgat is almost as old as the Republic of Indonesia itself. On 12 February 1946 the first parachute jump of the nascent Indonesian National Armed Forces was performed at the Maguwo Air Force Base in Yogyakarta by three people who jumped in the presence of the commander of the Armed Forces Sudirman and the first chief of staff of the Air Force, Air Commodore Suryadi Suryadarma: Amir Hamzah, Iswahyudi and Pungut, all three jumped from a converted Japanese transport aircraft. On 8 March 1947, with President Sukarno, Vice President Mohammad Hatta and defense officials in attendance, the first free fall jump was executed by Flight Lieutenants Sudyono and Soekotjo at the same airfield. These jumps by personnel of the then Pasukan Pertahanan Pangkalan (PPP) (Air Field Defence Troops) would become the precursor for their baptism of fire. The PPP, raised in October 1945, months before the formal founding of the Air Force on 9 April 1946, was an active part in the defense of Republic-held air force bases.

=== First airborne operations ===
The then republican Governor of Kalimantan Ir. Prince Muhammad Noor made a request to the Indonesian Air Force to send paratroopers to Kalimantan to form and organize pro-Republic guerrilla organizations to assist in the revolution in Borneo, opening a parent radio station to allow connections between Yogyakarta and Borneo rebels, and selecting more drop zones for future operations. At the initiative of the chief of staff of the Air Force, 12 indigenous sons of Kalimantan and two regular Air Force personnel were chosen. On 17 October 1947, thirteen airmen were successfully deployed in Sambi, West Kotawaringin, Central Kalimantan. They were Hari Hadi Sumantri (Semarang Radio Air Force mechanic), FM Soejoto (an Air Force radio interpreter from Ponorogo), Iskandar (troop leader), Ahmad Kosasih, Bachri, J. Bitak, C. Williem, Imanuel, Amirudin, Ali Akbar, M Dahlan, JH. Darius, and Marawi. They were deployed from the C-47 Dakota RI-002 aircraft flown by an American named Bob Freeberg who also owned the aircraft, co-pilot Warrant Officer Suhodo, and the jumpmaster, Pilot Officer Amir Hamzah. Acting as the pointer to the parapet was Major Tjilik Riwut who was a native son of Borneo. This was the first airborne operation in Indonesian history.

This operation was later designated as the anniversary of the Komando Pasukan Gerak Cepat (Rapid Response Troop Commandos). This makes this organization the oldest active special forces unit in Indonesia and within all of Southeast Asia, and the first airborne and air force infantry unit to be founded in the region. (The Philippine 1st Scout Ranger Regiment, the 2nd oldest, was established two years later in 1949.)

=== Air Base Defense Troops (ABDT) ===
By 1950 the Jakarta-based PPP was still known as the "Air Base Defense Troops (ABDT)", but now had paratrooper squadrons within its ranks. Troops were divided into eight companies/squadrons and led by Captain (later Major) RHA Wiriadinata with his deputy 1st Lieutenant R Soeprantijo. Then in the mid-1950s, the Inspectorate of Air Base Defense Forces (IPP) was based in Sabang, Jakarta, which in April 1952 was transferred to Cililitan Air Base, East Jakarta. An additional service, the PSU ('Penangkis Serangan Udara, Air Defense Component) was later added to provide an air defense capability. The Parachute School was also opened to train future Air Force paratroopers at the Andir Air Force Base in Bandung, West Java, as a continuation of the Para School embryo in Maguwo. Its alumni, both officers and airmen, later formed the basis for the Kompi-kompi Pasukan Gerak Tjepat-PGT (Quick Reaction Troop Companies) which were formed in February 1952, with Captain Wiriadinata as the commanding officer and concurrently as Commander of Andir Air Force Base in Bandung. By 1958 these consisted of 11 Independent Airborne Companies, 8 Air Base Defense companies and 1 Air Defense Artillery Battery.

=== PGT Regimental Combat Team (RTP-PGT) ===
Subsequently, in the 1960s, PGT (Pasukan Gerak Tjepat (old spelling, Pasukan Gerak Cepat in the Indonesian Spelling System): Quick Reaction Troops) was also assigned to operations in West Irian (Papua) under the command of the Air Force. The PGT Regimental Combat Team (RTP PGT) was based in Bandung with Captain (U) Sugiri Sukani as commander. Air Commodore RHA Wiriadinata was the first PGT commander (1952) which brought much progress to paratroopers in Indonesia, especially in the Air Force. The concept of PGT since its inception was focused on the ability of Commando and Para combined and thus a unification of the parachute companies of the air force bases into battalions that would be deployed into battle for operations at home and abroad.

The raising of the PGT RCT was in response to the Army's formation of the modern day Kopassus (then the Para-Commando Regiment, RPKAD), as well as in response to the twin rebellions of the Revolutionary Government of the Republic of Indonesia and Permesta (1957-1961).

=== Air Force Bases Defense Command (KOPPAU) ===
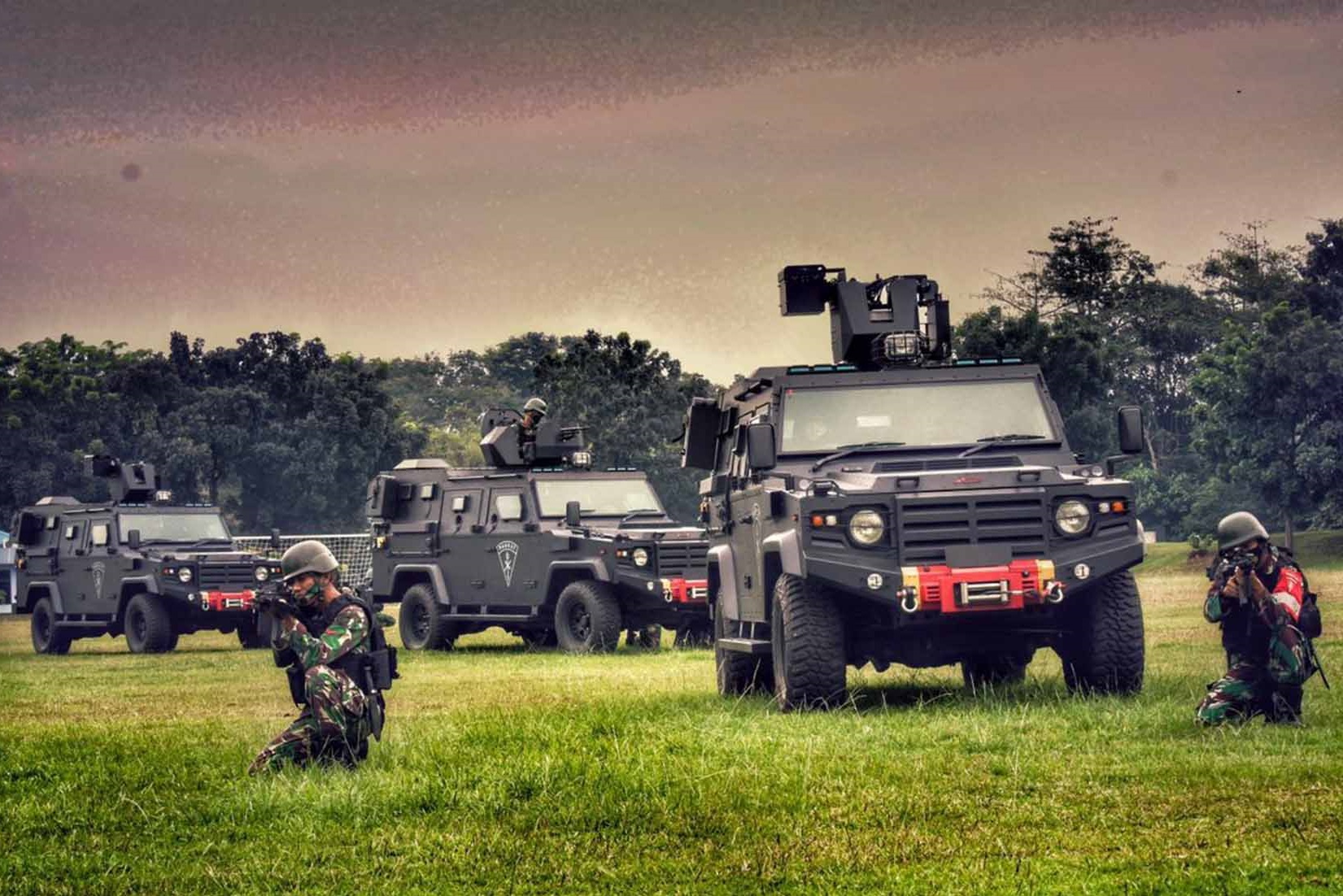
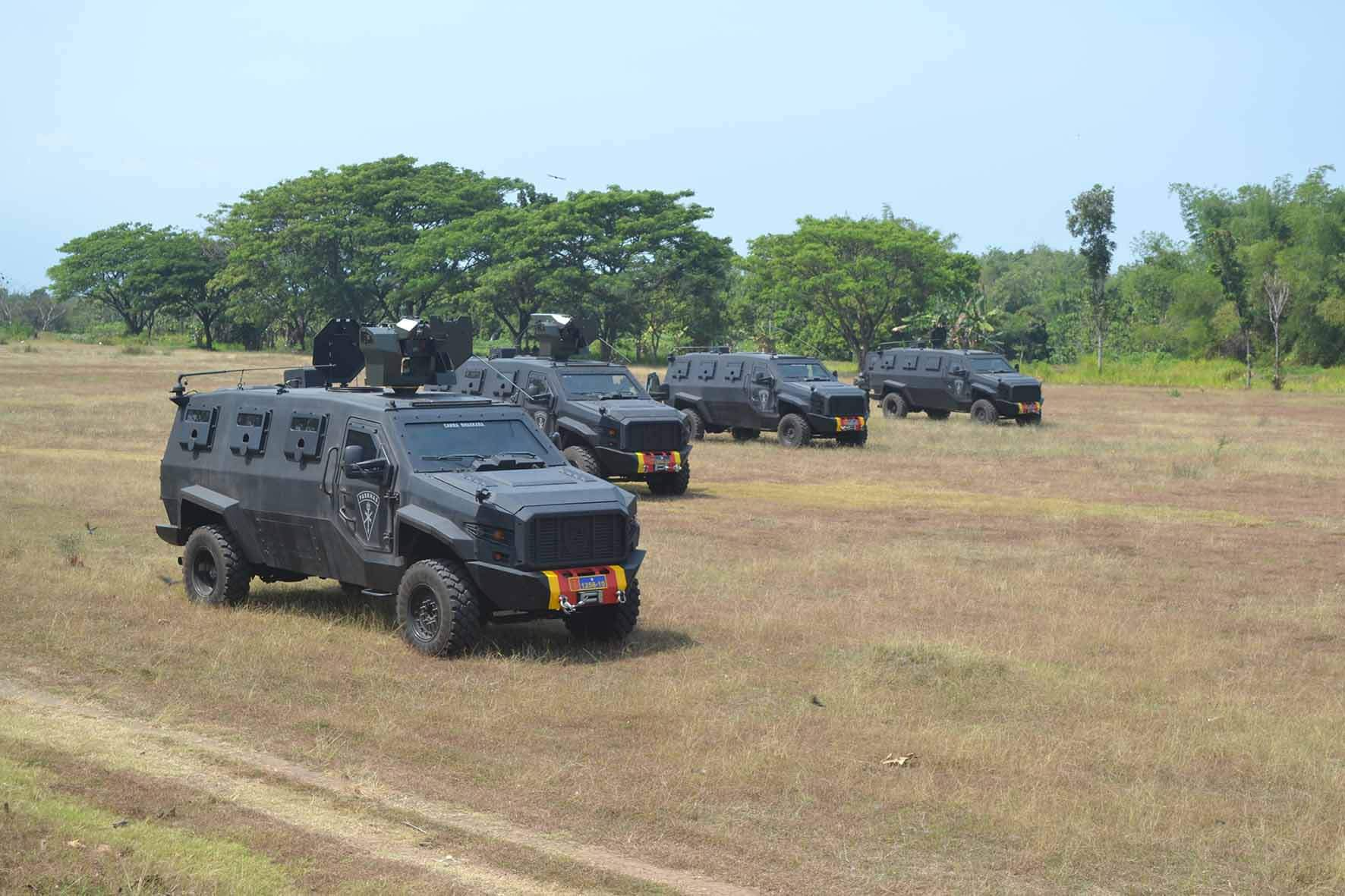
Paskhas commando vehicles: ILSV and Turangga.

On 15 October 1962, based on the a decree of the CSAF, the Air Force Bases Defense Command (KOPPAU, Komando Pertahanan Pangkalan Angkatan Udara) was established. KOPPAU consist of the Command HQ and HQ Company in Bandung, PPP (Air Base Defence Forces) Regiment in Jakarta and PGT Regiment in Bandung. The PPP Regiment was composed of the regimental headquarters and five Base Defense Battalions based in Jakarta, Banjarmasin, Makassar, Biak and Palembang (then moved to Medan). The PGT regiment consisted of three battalions,: the 1st Battalion PGT (3rd Honor Guard (Air Force) Battalion, Cakrabhirawa Regiment) based in Bogor, 2nd Battalion PGT in Jakarta and 3rd Battalion PGT in Bandung, together with the regimental headquarters based in Jakarta. The battalions were subdivided into the battalion HQ company and 3–5 parachute infantry companies, base defense companies or air defense artillery batteries, depending on specialty, the 1st battalion of the PGT, which was assigned as public duties battalion, was assigned six guard of honour companies and the battalion HQ company.

It was during that period that the Air Force, through the KOPPAU and the Indonesian National Air Defense Forces Command, acquired a surface to air missile defense capability, a first in Southeast Asia, via the S-75 Dvina SAM system imported from the Soviet Union, leading to the formation of the 100th Medium/Long Distance Missile Regiment/Wing.

The then chief of staff of the Air Force, Air Marshal Omar Dani, was made commandant of the KOPPAU concurrent with his duties before being promoted to Air Chief Marshal.

=== Kopasgat ===
KOPPAU was, as a result of recommendations given during a Ministry of Defense conference in Bandung dated 11–16 April 1966, then transformed to KOPASGAT (Komando Pasukan Gerak Cepat) with the strength of three regiments each based in Bandung, Jakarta, and Surabaya, under its new commander Air Commodore Saleh Basarah. Each of the regiments were organized into a HQ unit and 3–5 groups/battalions, each divided into 3–6 companies/squadrons/batteries (the Bandung wing had 2 battalions). The 100th Wing remained under its operational supervision. Furthermore, based on the Air Force chief of Staff Decision No. 57 on 1 July 1970, the term "Regiment" was changed into "Wing" for distinguishing their unit names from the Indonesian Army (as part of a general reorganization of the armed forces under the Suharto administration). Kopasgat was then famous for its Leopard camouflage pattern uniform which was worn during Operation Seroja, led by then commander Air Commodore R. Suprantijo, and its orange berets, a singularity within the National Armed Forces.

=== Puspaskhasau ===
Puspaskhasau (Pusat Pasukan Khas Angkatan Udara meaning "Air Force Special Forces Command") later replaced the name Kopasgat. It was based on the dynamics of organizational improvement and consolidation of TNI units, then based on Air Force Chief of staff Decision No. Kep / 22 / III / 1985 dated 11 March 1985. Air Commodore LE Siagian was the first commander of the rebadged unit.

=== Korpaskhasau ===
Along with the improvements of the TNI and Air Force organization, on 17 July 1997 according to the Decree no. SKEP / 09 / VII / 1997 of the Commander of the National Armed Forces the status of Paskhas was elevated from Central Executive Agency status to that of a Principal Combatant Command (Kotamabin) and was therefore renamed as the Korps Pasukan Khas Angkatan Udara/ KORPASKHASAU" which is simply called as Korps Paskhas or just PASKHAS. It was in time for the 50th anniversary of the first airborne jumps in Kalimantan. Air Commodore Budhy Santoso was commandant when the changes were made.

In 2011, to reflect the importance of the Paskhas to the Air Force, the rank of the commanding general was changed into that of an Air Vice Marshal, the commanding general then being AVM Amarullah who was appointed that year replacing Air Commodore Harry Budiono.

=== Back to Kopasgat–Korpasgat ===
On 26 January 2022, as part of the celebrations marking the 75th anniversary of its formation, the unit name was officially reverted to Kopasgat through Commander of the Armed Forces Decision No. Kep/66/I/2022. Air Vice Marshal Eris Widodo, who had been appointed Commandant General of Korpaskhasau in 2018, was the commander at the time.

On 10 August 2025, the rank of its commanding officer was raised, with the corps being led by an Air Marshal. The commander's title was also changed from Komandan Kopasgat (Dankopasgat) to Panglima Kopasgat (Pangkopasgat), and the unit name was changed from Kopasgat to Korpasgat. Air Marshal Deny Muis, appointed the same year as the rename, was also the first ever three-star air officer to command the service.

== Organization ==
According to Presidential Regulation No. 84/2025 on the Organization of the Indonesian National Armed Forces, the organizational structure of Korpasgat comprises the following components:

=== Leadership element ===
Korpasgat is headed by a Commander (Panglima Korpasgat), a position held by a 3-star Air Marshal. The Commander reports to the Air Force Chief of Staff but operationally answers to the Commander of the Indonesian National Armed Forces.

=== Leadership support element ===
1. Korpasgat Chief of Staff (Kepala Staf Korpasgat), a position held by a 2-star Air Force Air Vice Marshal;
2. Korpasgat Inspectorate General (Inspektur Korpasgat), a position held by a 1-star Air Force Air Commodore;
3. Advisory staffs to Korpasgat Commander (Staf Ahli Panglima Korpasgat), of which the coordinator is a position held by a 1-star Air Force Air Comoodore;
4. Assistants to the Korpasgat Commander, which consist of following positions:
  - Assistant for Intelligence (Asisten Intelijen / Asintel);
  - Assistant for Operations (Asisten Operasi / Asops);
  - Assistant for Personnel (Asisten Personel / Aspers);
  - Assistant for Logistics (Asisten Logistik / Aslog);
  - Assistant for Communication and Electronics (Asisten Komunikasi dan Elektronika / Askomlek);
  - Assistant for Territorial Affairs (Asisten Teritorial / Aster);
  - Assistant for Planning (Asisten Perencanaan / Asren);
5. Korpasgat Headquarters and HQ Detachment (Detasemen Markas / Denma);
6. Korpasgat Secretariat General (Sekretariat Umum / Setum);
7. Korpasgat Program and Budgeting Unit (Program dan Anggaran / Progar);
8. Korpasgat Procurement Unit;
9. Korpasgat Administration Coordinator Unit.

=== Service element ===
1. Korpasgat Medical Office;
2. Korpasgat Legal Office;
3. Korpasgat Operations Command and Control Center (Pusat Komando dan Pengendalian / Puskodal);
4. Korpasgat Finance Office;
5. Korpasgat Public Affairs and Media Office;
6. Korpasgat Airworthiness and Safety Office;
7. Korpasgat Military Police;
8. Korpasgat Maintenance and Materiel Unit;
9. Korpasgat Communication, Information, and Cyber Unit;
10. Korpasgat Chaplaincy and Mental Guidance Office;
11. Korpasgat Information and Data Processing Office; and
12. Korpasgat Arsenal.

=== Operational element ===
1. Para-Commando Division, led by a 1-star Air Force Air Commodore;
2. Air Defense Artillery Division, led by a 1-star Air Force Air Commodore;
3. Air Bases Defense and Security Division, led by a 1-star Air Force Air Commodore;
4. Combat Support Division, led by a 1-star Air Force Air Commodore;
5. Bravo 90 Counterterrorism Unit;
6. Korpasgat Training Command; and
7. Korpasgat Intelligence Detachment.

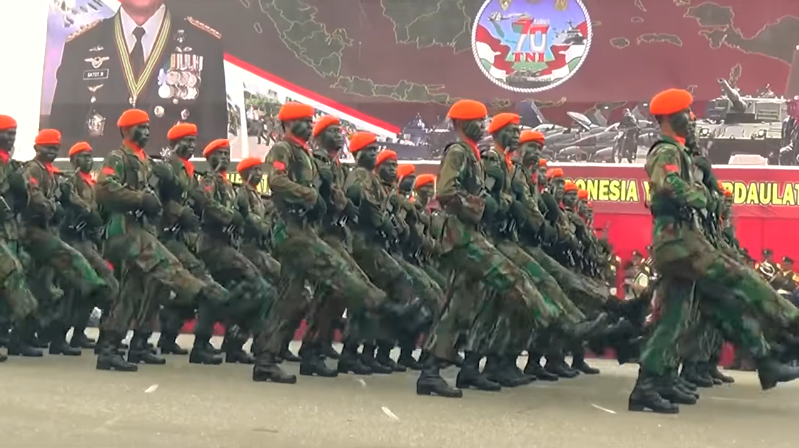
Korpasgat troops on parade wearing their distinctive orange berets

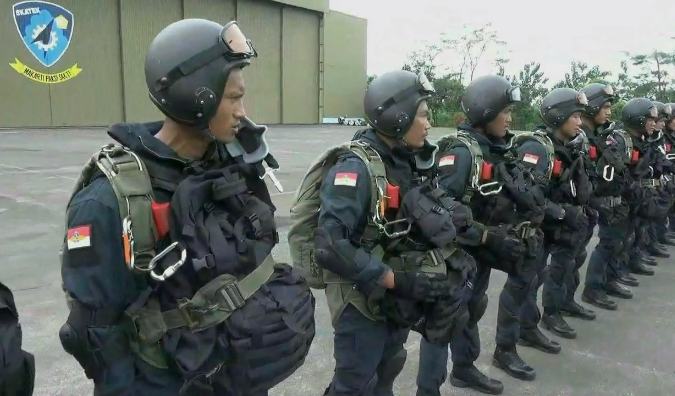
Korpasgat commandos getting ready for Airborne operations

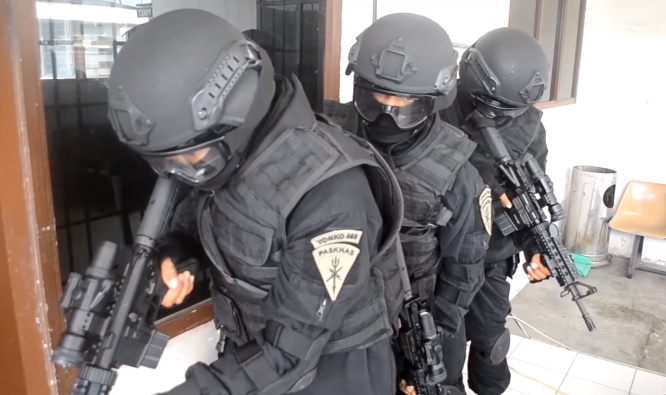
Korpasgat commandos from the 469th Commando Battalion during Counter-terrorism exercise

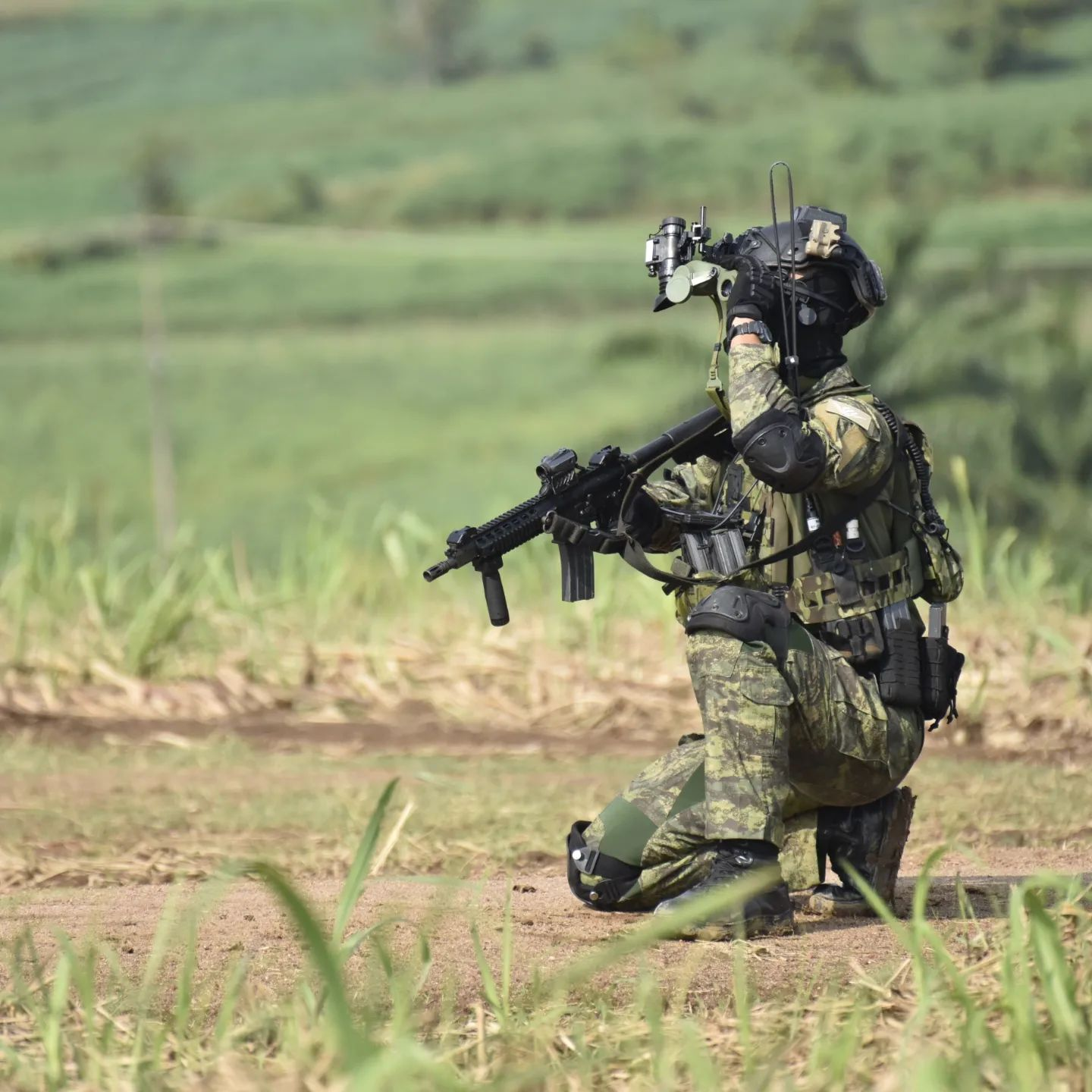
Korpasgat member during a training exercise at Lampung Air Weapon Range, a distinct Korpasgat camo can be see

== Combat qualifications ==
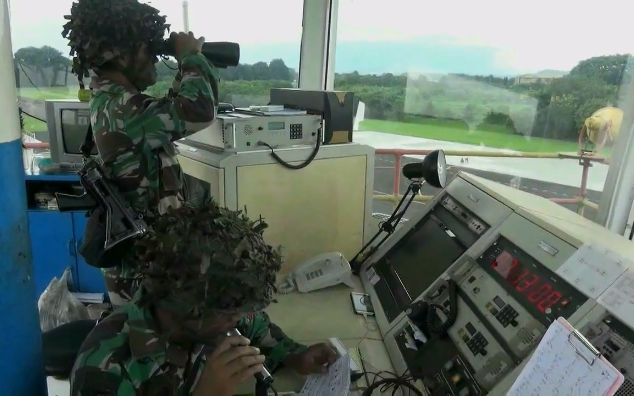
Korpasgat soldiers during air base defense operations which are capable for conducting Air Traffic Control activities during air base lock-down status

Korpasgat personnel are an integral part of the TNI-AU, having their own specialty. Korpasgat personnel have the qualifications and special ability to protect, defend and operate airfield facilities.

The basic qualification for all Korpasgat personnel has been "para-commando". Other qualifications are added based on his specialty. As a Combat Control team (CCT), they have combat free-fall ability, scuba diving, and combat climber. CCT must be able to infiltrate from three media aspects (sea, air, land). Beside that, this team's personnel must have one of the air aspect specialisations, such as: Air Traffic Controller (PLLU), Meteorology (Meteo), Electronic-Communication (Komlek), Combat Field Engineer (Zeni), Intelligence, Fire Fighter (PK), Ground handling, Petroleum affairs (Permi), and Combat-Health affairs (Keslap). For free-fall qualification, they must be brave enough to jump from high altitude and open the parachute at minimum altitude. The airborne technique that used was HALO (High Altitude Low Opening) or HAHO (High Altitude High Opening), with jumps around 20,000 feet (6 km; 4 mi) above sea level.

== Specialization ==
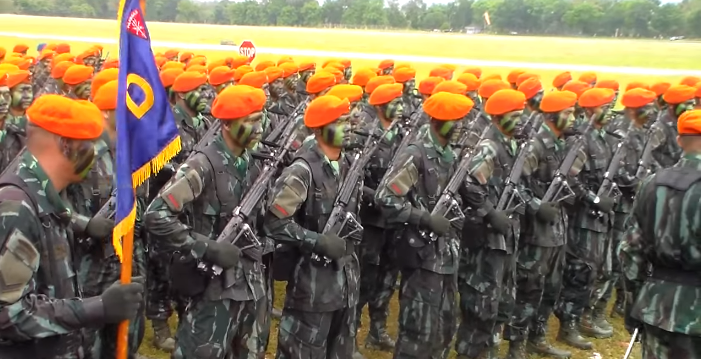
Korpasgat commandos in formation before parade in an Indonesian Air Force base for commemorating the Corp's anniversary

The Korpasgat is divided into several Specializations which are:

1. Training and Education Center (Pusdiklat), is responsible for carrying out the training of Korpasgat abilities through the implementation of Education, Exercise, Research, Testing and Development of Tactics and Procedures to carry out the task of seizing objectives and defense of Air Force Strategic Objects, Air Defense, Special Operations and Typical Air Force Military Operations.
2. Counter-terrorism (Bravo Detachment 90), is responsible for carrying out Intelligence Operations, Airborne Aspects of Terror Countermeasures Operations and other Special Operations in Air Force Military Operations under the policy of the Commander of the Armed Forces.
3. Branch Detachment (Detasemen Matra), is in charge of carrying out combat control operations, base controls, combat Search and Rescue, and Jumpmaster trainings for Korpasgat personnel.
4. Air Defense Artillery Division (Divisi Hanud), is part of the Korpasgat which is in charge of carrying out air defense operations within and outside air force bases as part of the national air defense system and other military operations according to the policy of the Commander of the Armed Forces within the wider Air Force organization.
5. Para-Commandos (Parako), are Infantry Commandos in a Battalion size tasked with carrying out Korpasgat main operational combat tasks such as target assault operations and defense operations of the Indonesian Air Force's strategic objects during combat and peace-time situations
6. Base Defense Division (Divisi Pertahanan Pangkalan), serves as an air force base defense unit for Korpasgat personnel assigned to base security and to reinforce the Air Force Police. Three regiments are assigned to each of the regional divisions, which are divided into battalions assigned to each air force base.
7. Support Brigade (Brigade Banpur), serves as an assistance force for combatants especially Commando troops who are usually deployed to the frontline of battle, either in the form of combat or service support. The Korpasgat is organized into two national regiment-sized support formations, the Combat Support Regiment and the Administrative Support Regiment. There are plans for the raising of 6 more regional support regiments, two each per division.
8. Airport Security Platoons (Satuan Teritorial Udara Pasgat/Pam Bandara Internasional): These Korpasgat platoons of commandos are responsible for airport security, safety and anti-terrorism operations in protection of the country's 27 international airposts.

== Operations ==
=== Operation Trikora ===
During Operation Trikora, the Korpasgat corps then "PGT AURI" deployed a total of 532 paratroopers – the largest number of military personnel operationally deployed to West Papua. The number of personnel from TNI, National Police (Mobile Brigade) and volunteers taking part amounted to 1,154 personnel with 216 deaths / lost and 296 captured. On 25 April 1962, during the operation of Banteng Ketaton as many as 40 PGT troops under the leadership of Sgt. Maj. J. Picaulima was deployed for the first time in West Irian in the Fak-Fak area as well as the 39 PGT troops in Kaimana on 26 April 1962 did well. On 11 May 1962, PGT troops under the leadership of 1st Lieutenant Manuhua conducted a jump in Sorong during Operation Serigala.

One of the heroic and historic stories is the event of the National flag hoisting for the first time on a hill named Cendrawasih, in West Papua, conducted by Kopasgat members at the initiative of Sergeant M.F. Mengko. On 19 May 1962, a total of 81 Kopasgat paratroopers departed from Pattimura Air Base, Ambon, on board a C-130 Hercules transport plane piloted by Major (U) T.Z Abidin towards the target of a parachuting area around Wersar Village, Teminabuan District. In the early morning they were deployed just above the headquarters of the Dutch army. Suddenly close combat was unavoidable. Dutch troops which were sleeping was in shock because there are troops of Kopasgat deployed right in their bases, while Kopasgat soldiers also did not expect to be deployed in the Dutch base, rather being deployed in tea plantations. This heroic action resulted in the death of 53 Kopasgat parachute commandos including the platoon commander 2nd Lieutenant Suhadi. To commemorate the historic event in the area around Teminabuan in Sorong, West Papua, a monument that is named Tugu Merah Putih (Red and White monument) was later built on the site of the battle.

=== Operation Seroja ===
Kopasgat members defending Baucau after establishing control over its airbase, 1975.

On 10 December 1975, 3 days after the jumping at Dili, Detachment B Kopasgat together with other airborne forces (Kostrad, Kopassandha) parachuted into Baucau as part of Operation Seroja. The task force, dubbed Satgas B (Task Force B) consists mainly of Indonesia's elite airborne capabable units which include Kostrad 17th Airborne Brigade, Kopassandha commandos from Nanggala 5, and Kopasgat Detachment B. The objective of the Kopasgat is to seize Baucau Airfield and establish it as a frontline airbase that is capable of accepting wide-body jets or combat aircraft to operational status for the future operations in East Timor.

Eight C-130 Hercules and an escorting B-26 that took off from Penfui Airport was the flight that was present during the seizure. After the first sortie, the combat control team dispatched the B-26 that was on standby in the air to conduct a close air support. However, the forces had already cleared the airfield and its surrounding areas and even formed a rendezvous point, eventually the pilot of the B-26 contacted the forces that they did not need to deploy close air support yet. Soon after the landing of the Kopasgat's sortie's, the forces realized that the airfield did not have adequate to support the facilitie's conditions. There weren't much left that the Portuguese left except two containers consisting of Alouette helicopter engines. The combat control team and the base control team quickly analyze the airfield and compiled a list of what was needed to return the airfield to operational status, then reported it to the headquarters. The seizure also was a success for the implementation of the OP3UD (Operasi Pembentukan dan Pengoperasian Pangkalan Udara Depan) or Airhead Operation Doctrine.

The structure of Kopasgat Detachment B at the time consisted of intelligence and operations section (Sie Intel/Ops), personnel and logistic section (Sie Pers/Log) . With its combat unit consisting of combat control team (Dalpur), base control team (Dallan), and a para-commando unit (Parako). The total strength of Detachment B consisted of 156 men, with Captain Afendi being the detachment commander

=== Other operations ===
- Operation Dwikora
  - Landing at Pontian
- Operation Seroja
- Operation Trisula
- Rebel assault operations

=== Peacekeeping Missions ===
- Garuda Contingent in Vietnam
- XIV Garuda Contingent under UNPROFOR in Yugoslavia
- XIV A-B Garuda Contingent in Bosnia
- XVII Garuda Contingent under OKI in the Philippines
- XXIII Garuda Contingent in Lebanon

== See also ==
- Indonesian Air Force
- Kopassus – Indonesian Army special forces.
- Kopaska – Indonesian Navy tactical Frogman commando.
- Denjaka – Indonesian Joint Navy-Marine special forces.
