= Battle of Padang Area =

1945-1946 Battles in Padang

- Part of Indonesian National Revolution
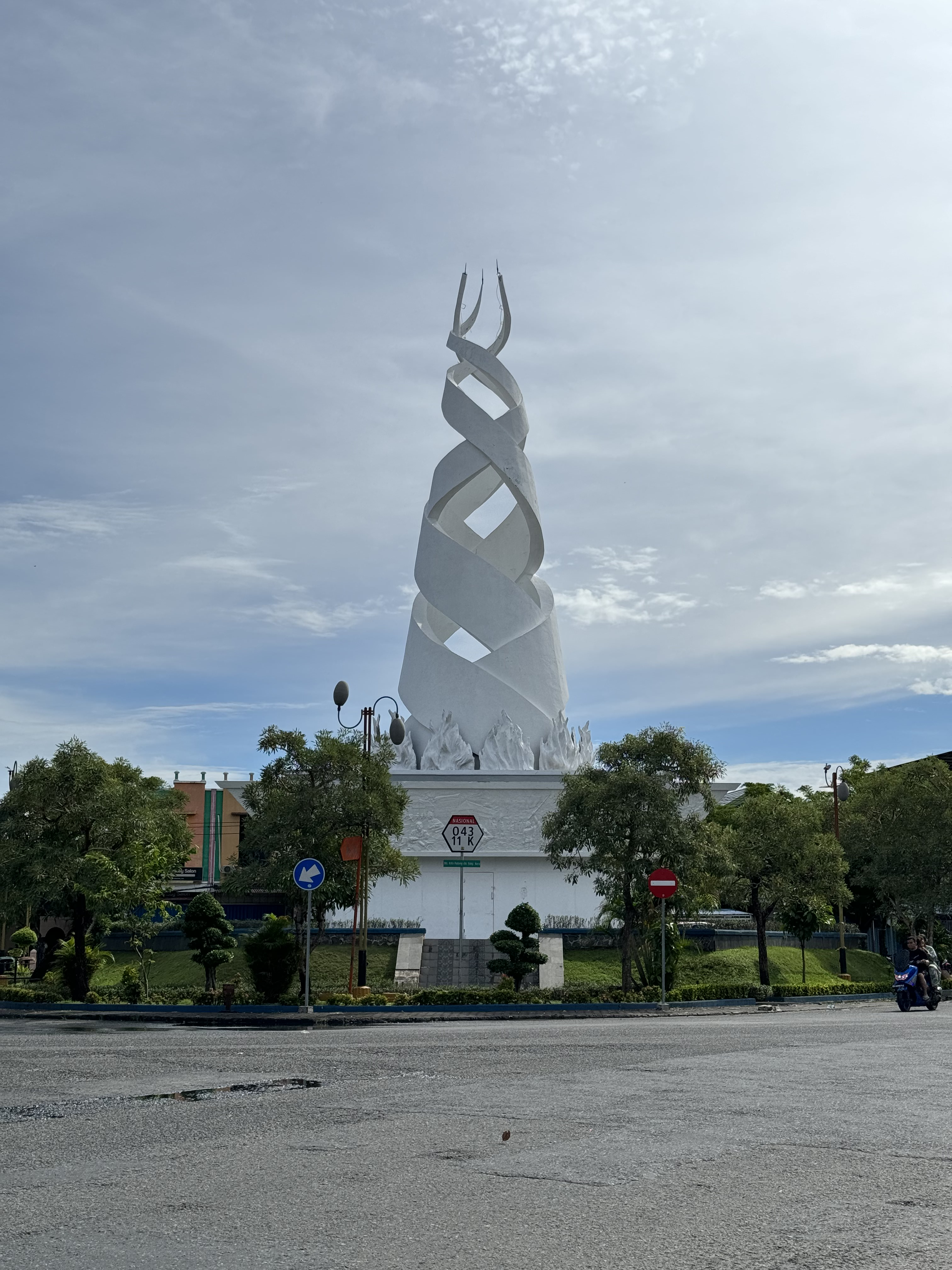
- The Padang Area Monument is to commemorate the battle and those who participated.
Date	17 November 1945 – September 1946
Location	Padang, West Sumatra
Result	Indonesian victory; Allied headquarter in Padang destroyed and burned down by Indonesian forces; Allied gunpowder magazine looted
Territorial changes	Allied occupied zone recaptured by Indonesian forces

Belligerents
Indonesia	United Kingdom; Netherlands

Commanders and leaders
Ahmad Husein	Major Andreson †

Units involved
Banteng Division IX Command; Female Sabil Muslimat militia Hizbullah militia	British Army; KNIL; NICA

Strength
Unknown	Unknown

Casualties and losses
20 killed	at least 40 killed dozens of British Indian soldiers defected to Indonesia; Many headquarters destroyed Many weapons and vehicles captured
- 12 civilians killed

The Battle of Padang Area (Indonesian: Pertempuran Padang Area) was a fierce engagement between Indonesian forces and Allied troops in Padang, West Sumatra. The conflict began when Allied forces initiated clashes and looted several Indonesian headquarters in the city. In response, Indonesian forces launched counterattacks in Padang, leading to a series of skirmishes throughout the area.

== Background ==
On 13 October 1945, the Allied forces (British–Dutch troops) landed in the Gulf of Bayur, Padang. The regiment was under the command of Brigadier General Hutchinson.

On 15 October 1945, Hutchinson met with the Indonesian government in Padang. They discussed using the Padang Resident's building as their headquarters. The Indonesian government agreed to the proposal. However, once the Allied forces entered the building, they looted numerous government documents.

== Battle and skirmishes ==
On 15 November 1945, British forces looted and stole government documents from the Resident's building in Padang. In response, the Indonesian forces deployed 500 troops to the area. The troops disguised themselves as employees of the Resident's office to carry out their operation.

=== Assault on Simpang Haru School (1945) ===
On 27 November 1945, KNIL soldiers entered Simpang Haru School while teachers and students were in the middle of their lessons. The soldiers disrupted the school, throwing various items they found. The headmaster, Said Rasjad, was displeased with their actions and confronted them, asking what they needed. Determined to resolve the issue, Said went to their headquarters to discuss matters with the commander. However, the soldiers brutally assaulted him, leaving him incapacitated. Shortly afterward, some police officers arrived at the enemy headquarters and took Said to their office.

That night, the most intense armed confrontation took place when a group of youths, led by Rasyid Boneng, launched an assault on the engineering school building occupied by Allied forces. The attack resulted in heavy casualties among the KNIL troops. However, in retaliation, Dutch forces captured the youth fighters, including their commander, Rasyid Boneng. They then burned down the village in Simpang Haru as an act of reprisal.

=== Skirmish at Barameh River (1945) ===
On 5 December 1945, Major Anderson launched skirmishes in Sungai Barameh following the deaths of several Allied officers at the hands of Indonesian fighters. The attacks targeted three villages around Sungai Barameh, resulting in the deaths of 12 civilians and 10 soldiers at their headquarters.

=== Assault on Rimbo Kaluang (1946) ===
On 21 February 1946, Indonesian fighters under the command of Major Ahmad Husein prepared the strategic to encountered the incident on Baramah Tiger. And in next time they attacked the British-Dutch headquarters and gunpowder magazine in Rimbo Kaluang. The attack was successful, as they destroyed the headquarters and looted the gunpowder magazine.

=== Ambush on Pasar Oesang (1946) ===
On 16 April 1946, Indonesian fighters commanded by Kemal Mustafa successfully ambushed an Allied convoy at Pasar Oesang. During the ambush, they captured a variety of weapons, including Sten guns, a truck loaded with firearms, and rifles.

=== Assault on Simpang Haru (1946) ===
From 7 to 9 July 1946, Indonesian fighters under the command of Husein launched an assault on Simpang Haru. On the third day, they launched their largest attack on the British-occupied zone, forcing the Allied forces to retreat. During the offensive, Indonesian fighters captured a significant number of Allied weapons.

=== Battle of the Bayur (1946) ===
On 27 August 1946, Indonesian forces launched an attack on the Gulf of Bayur, the Allied landing site in Padang. They successfully stormed the British positions, but the Allies launched a counterattack. However, the counteroffensive was repelled by the Indonesian forces, who held their ground.

== Aftermath ==
The British suffered heavy losses, allowing Indonesian fighters to recapture the occupied zone. The British forces withdrew from Padang, leaving the Dutch behind. This victory significantly boosted the morale of the Indonesian forces, strengthening their resolve and increasing their spirit of independence in the ongoing struggle for freedom.

=== Legacy ===
After the battles Ahmad Husein was known as “Tiger Kuranji” after defeated the Dutch and British allied forces at Padang,Bayur, and Rimbo Kaluang also the title of “Tiger Kuranji” was given by actively British and Dutch forces by recruited many youth soldiers and his success tactical against allied forces.

== Sources ==
- Revi, Handayani (2020). "Hizbullah Kuranji di Front Padang Area (1945-1948)". UIN Bukittinggi. 3 (3).
