= Battle of Medan =

1946 battle of the Indonesian National Revolution

Battle of Medan Battle for the Medan Area
- Part of the Indonesian National Revolution
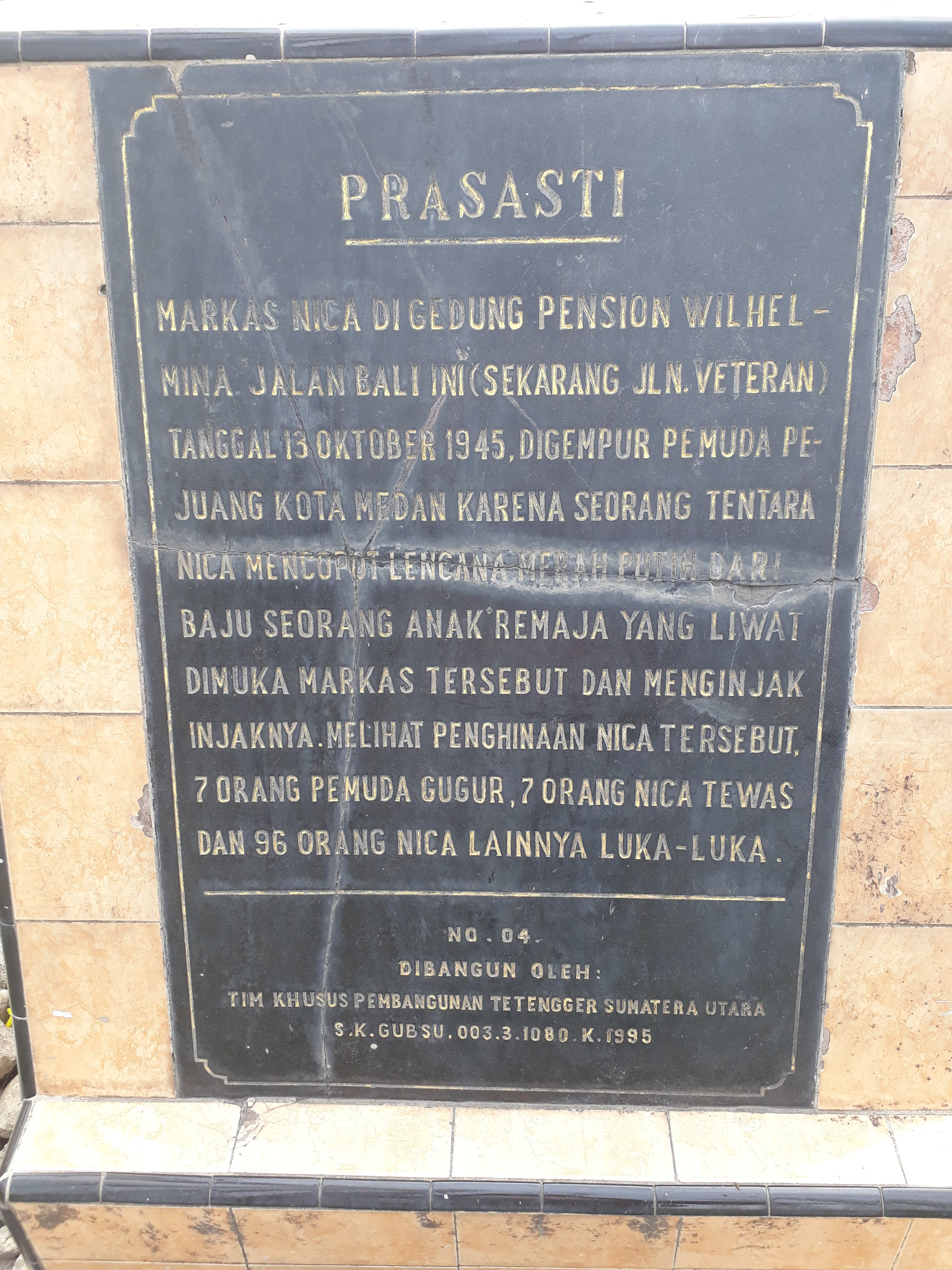
- Plaque commemorating those killed in the clashes following the incident that led to the Battle of Medan (Note: The sign in English reads: "The NICA Headquarters at the Wilhelmina Inn, located here at Bali Street (now Veteran Street), was attacked by young local freedom fighters on 13 October 1945, because a NICA soldier snatched a red-and-white badge from a youth passing by the building, and trampled on it. This treason resulted in seven fallen youths, as well as seven dead and 96 injured NICA officials.")
Date	13 October 1945 – April 1946 (6 months)
Location	Medan, North Sumatra, Indonesia
Result	Allied victory

Belligerents
Indonesia	United Kingdom; British Raj; Netherlands; Dutch East Indies

Commanders and leaders
Achmad Tahir †	T.E.D. Kelly

Units involved
Indonesian Army	British Army; KNIL; NICA

The Battle of Medan, known locally as the Battle for the Medan Area (Indonesian: Pertempuran Medan Area) took place between Allied forces and the Indonesian Army in Medan, North Sumatra, and its surrounding area during the Indonesian National Revolution.

== Prelude ==
As the Second World War neared its end, the Allies agreed that post-war, the Dutch East Indies would come under the authority of the South East Asia Command headed by British Admiral Lord Louis Mountbatten. Following the surrender of Japan, British troops began landing in Sumatra and Java to release prisoners-of-war, repatriate Japanese troops and maintain law and order pending the return of the Dutch colonial authorities.

Meanwhile, on 17 August 1945, Sukarno proclaimed Indonesia independence in Jakarta, and appointed Muhammad Hasan as governor of Sumatra. However, news of the proclamation was only announced by Hasan in Medan on 30 September. Anticolonial protests by the locals were soon held. The Allies, who had just liberated Indonesia from its Japanese occupation, arrived at the Port of Belawan on 9 October and proceeded to central Medan under the leadership of Brigadier-General Theodore Edward Dudley Kelly, with the intention of reestablishing Dutch rule over the islands. Kelly also claimed a mission to evacuate Japanese detainess around Medan and the surrounding areas. Allied troops from the British Raj and the Netherlands were soon joined by the Netherlands Indies Civil Administration (NICA), in preparation for a Dutch takeover. This angered many local Indonesians, who saw this as an attack on their country's new sovereignty.

== Battle ==
On 13 October 1945, one of the Dutch officials following the British to the city centre stole a teenage boy's red-and-white (the flag of Indonesia's colours) badge just outside the Medan Hotel, located at Bali Road, and trampled on it. This sparked violent clashes, which turned into a battle. Similarly in Berastagi, a town several kilometres away, several British soldiers lowered the flag of Indonesia outside a government building, and the ensuing clashes killed them. The Indonesian Army launched attacks against troops from the Allies and the NICA in an effort to seize government buildings formerly occupied by the Japanese. The British delegation issued an ultimatum to the Indonesian people to disarm and hand over their weapons to the Allies, which was promptly ignored.

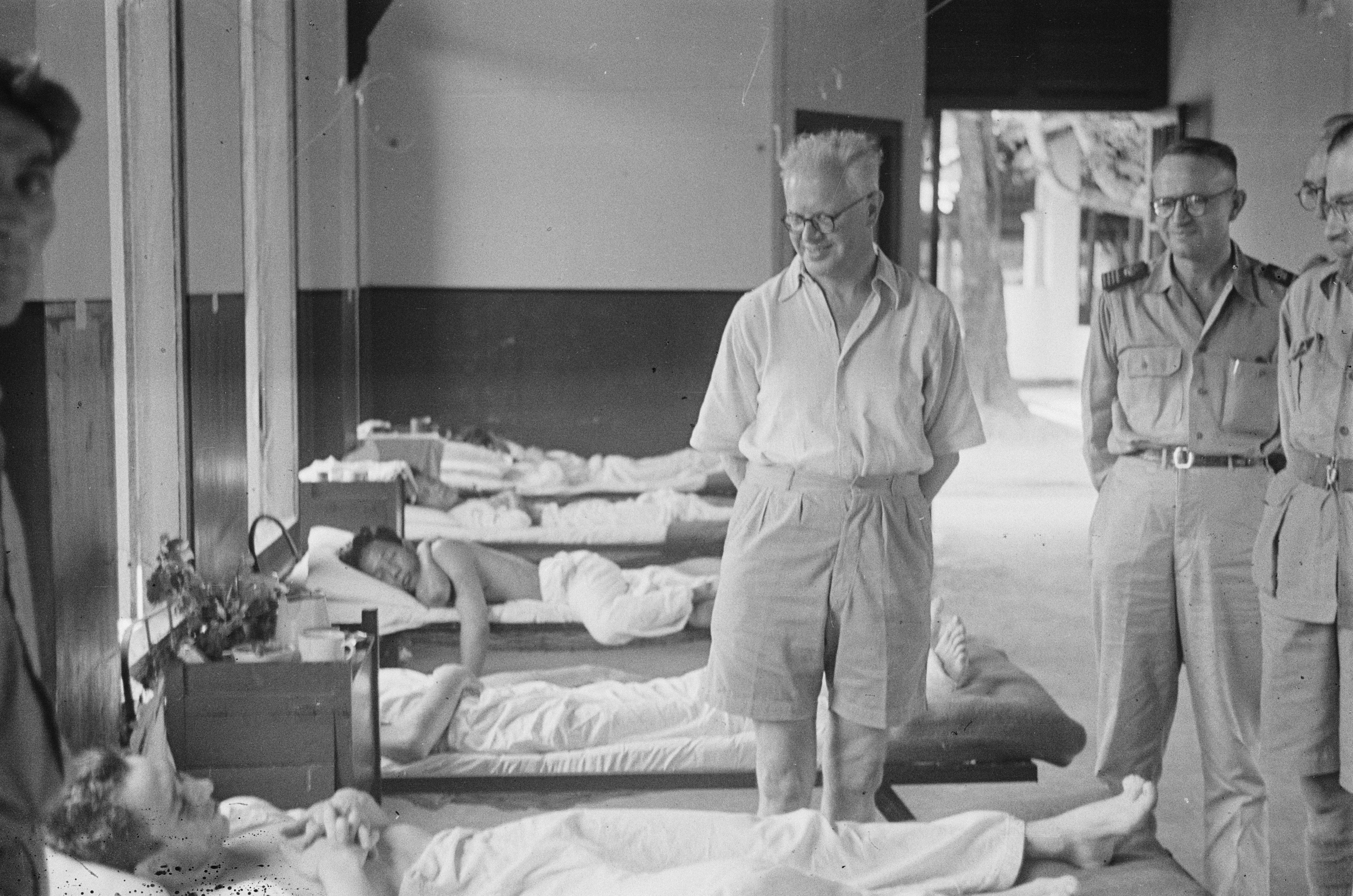
Carl Romme, Head of the Dutch Roman Catholic State Party (RCSP), inspects wounded Dutch and Indonesian soldiers during his visit to the Dutch East Indies, in 1946

On 1 December 1945, the Allies attempted to create a buffer zone and planted signs inscribed with the message "Fixed Medan Area Boundaries" (Note: Locally believed to be inscribed with "Fixed Boundaries Medan Area" instead) in the outskirts of Medan. Nine days later, on 10 December 1945, the Allies and the NICA launched a massive attack against Indonesian troops stationed in Medan. The attack caused many casualties on both sides. Kelly then handed control of the areas outside Medan to the Japanese general Moritake Tanabe, while Medan was still under Allied control. While succeeding in making some Japanese soldiers flee, others resisted, leading to a four-day clash that killed around 3,000 locals and 250 Japanese. Violence in Medan continued until April 1946, when the Allies succeeded in occupying the city, and Indonesian forces retreated to Pematangsiantar. Gradually, the Dutch took over the entirety of Medan until the end of their rule in Indonesia in 1949, and the British withdrew.

== Aftermath ==
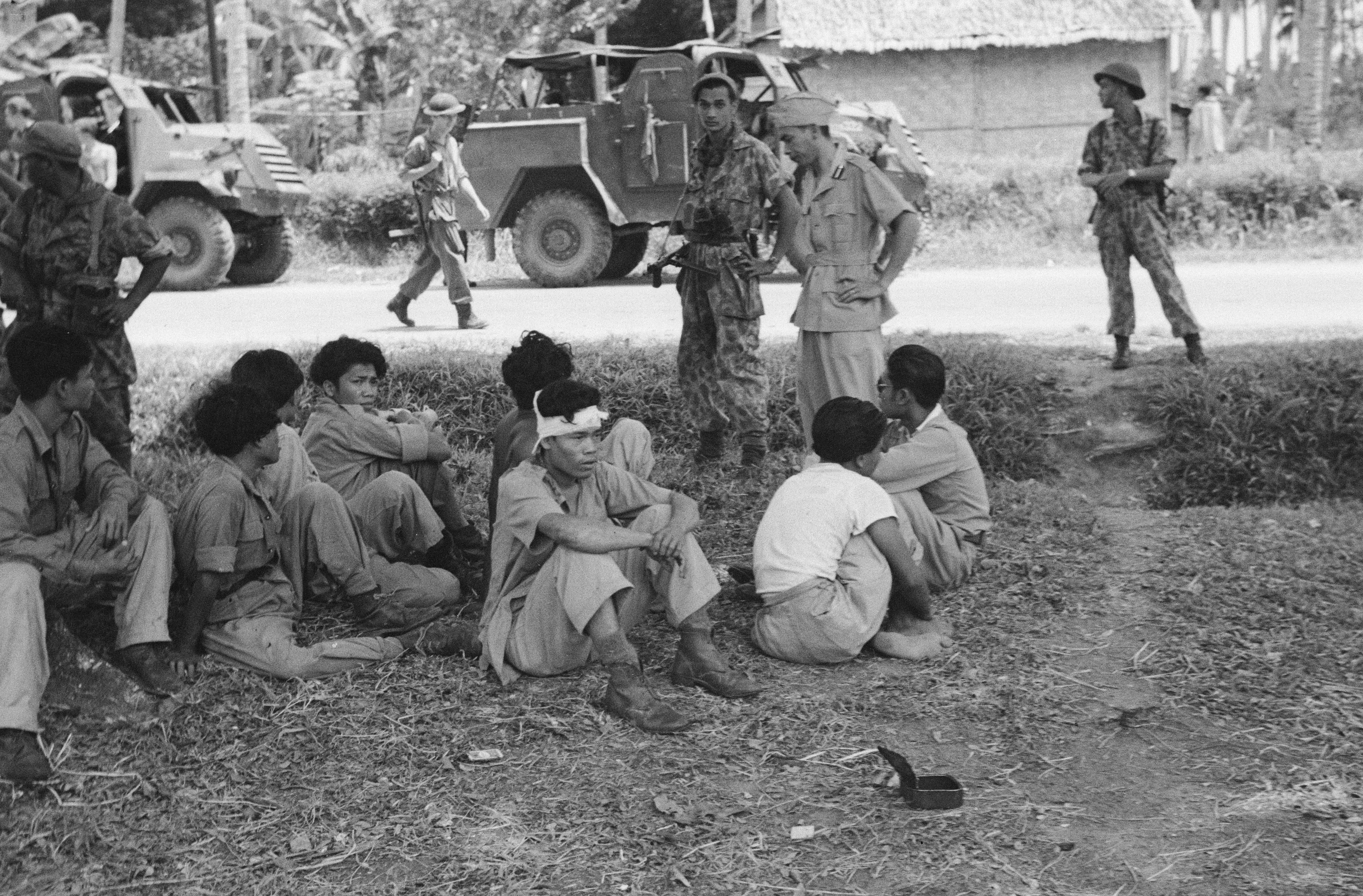
Indonesian partisans captured by the Dutch on the outskirts of Medan (1948)

Indonesia's local government established the People's Army Commando Regiment of Medan in order to continue their resistance against the Allies. Commander Initerus led troops in an insurgency against the Allies in Medan until 1949. Meanwhile on 30 July 1946, Kelly was promoted to substantive colonel, and on 1 August, he was awarded Commander of the Most Excellent Order of the British Empire (C.B.E.).
