= Likas Tarigan =

Indonesian politician

Likas Tarigan (13 June 1924 – 4 August 2016) was an Indonesian teacher and politician. She was a member of the People's Consultative Assembly from 1978 to 1988. She was married to freedom fighter Djamin Ginting. The movie 3 Nafas Likas, released in 2014, is based on her life story.
