= Humbang Hasundutan Regency =

Regency in North Sumatra, Indonesia

Coordinates: 2.2655°N 98.5038°E

Humbang Hasundutan Regency Kabupaten Humbang Hasundutan
- Regency
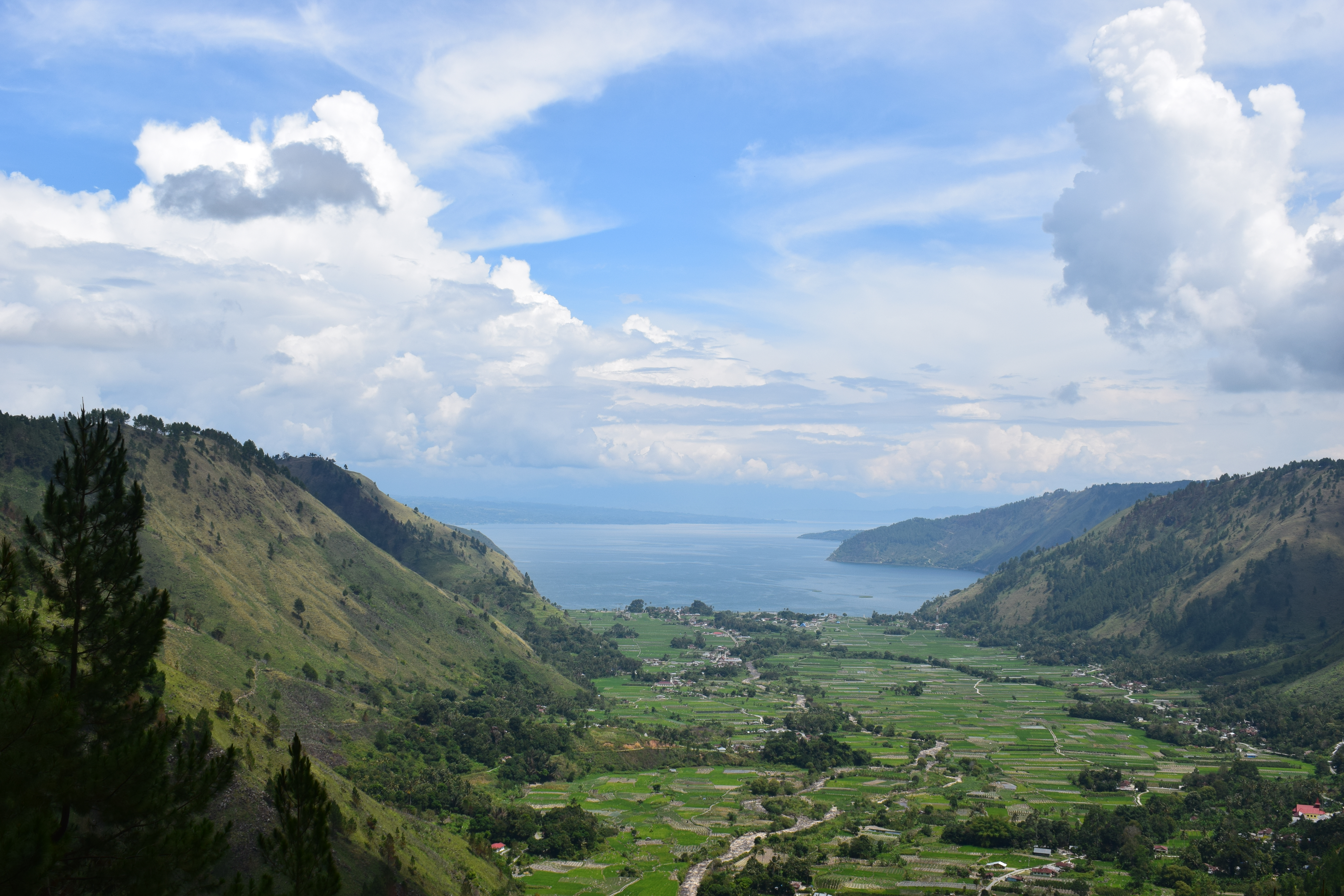
- Aerial view of Bakkara Valley from the hill in Dolok Sanggul.

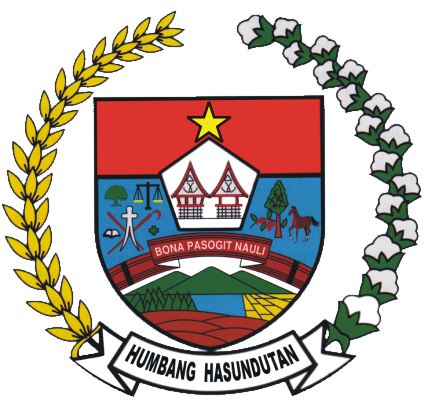
- Coat of arms
- Motto: Bona Pasogit Nauli (Beautiful Hometown)
- Country: Indonesia
- Province: North Sumatra
- Regency seat: Dolok Sanggul

Government
  - Regent: Oloan Paniaran Nababan
  - Vice Regent: Junita Rebeka Marbun
  - Chairman of Council of Representatives: Ramses Lumban Gaol (PDI-P)
  - Vice Chairmen of Council of Representatives: Marolop Manik (Golkar) and Labuhan Sihombing (People's Conscience Party)

Area
  - Total: 2,502.71 km^{2} (966.30 sq mi)

Population (mid 2025 estimate)
  - Total: 209,460
  - Density: 83.693/km^{2} (216.76/sq mi)
- Time zone: UTC+7 (WIB)
- Website: www.humbanghasundutankab.go.id

Humbang Hasundutan Regency is a landlocked regency in North Sumatra province of Indonesia. In the east of the regency, Baktiraja District stretches along a short part of the southern shore of Lake Toba in North Sumatra. The regency covers an area of 2,502.71 square kilometres (966.30 sq mi), and it had a population of 171,650 at the 2010 census and 197,751 at the 2020 census; the official estimate as of mid 2025 was 209,460 (comprising 105,101 males and 104,359 females). Its seat is the town of Dolok Sanggul. To the north is Samosir Regency and Pakpak Bharat Regency, to the east is North Tapanuli Regency, and to the west and south is Central Tapanuli Regency, and beyond the latter the Indian Ocean.

== Administrative districts ==
The regency is divided administratively into ten districts (kecamatan), tabulated below with their areas and their populations at the 2010 census and the 2020 census, together with the official estimates as of mid 2025. The table also includes the locations of the district administrative centres, the number of administrative villages (desa and kelurahan) in each district and its post code.

Kode Wilayah	Name of District (kecamatan)	Area in km^{2}	Pop'n census 2010	Pop'n census 2020	Pop'n estimate mid 2025	Admin centre	No. of villages	Post code
12.16.09	Pakkat	381.68	23,029	24,118	25,281	Pakkat Hauagong	22	22455
12.16.08	Onan Ganjang	222.56	9,835	11,152	11,703	Onan Ganjang	12	22454
12.16.07	Sijamapolang	140.18	5,112	6,145	6,346	Bonan Dolok	10	22459
12.16.06	Dolok Sanggul	209.30	43,197	51,087	55,266	Pasar; Doloksanggul	28	22457
12.16.05	Lintong Nihuta	181.26	29,066	33,412	35,301	Sibuntuon Parpea	22	22475
12.16.04	Paranginan	47.78	12,487	14,815	15,529	Sihonongan	11	22477
12.16.03	Baktiraja ^{(a)}	22.32	6,824	7,580	7,875	Marbun Toruan	7	22457
12.16.02	Pollung	327.36	17,615	21,415	22,670	Hutapaung	13	22457
12.16.01	Parlilitan	727.75	17,316	19,887	20,999	Sihotang; Hasugian Tonga	20	22456
12.16.10	Tarabintang	242.52	7,169	8,140	8,490	Tarabintang	9	22451
	Totals	2,502.71	171,650	197,751	209,460	Doloksanggul	154	

== Notes ==
(a) including Simamora Island (Pulau Simamora) in Lake Toba.
