= Dolok Sanggul =

Coordinates: 2°32′N 98°49′E

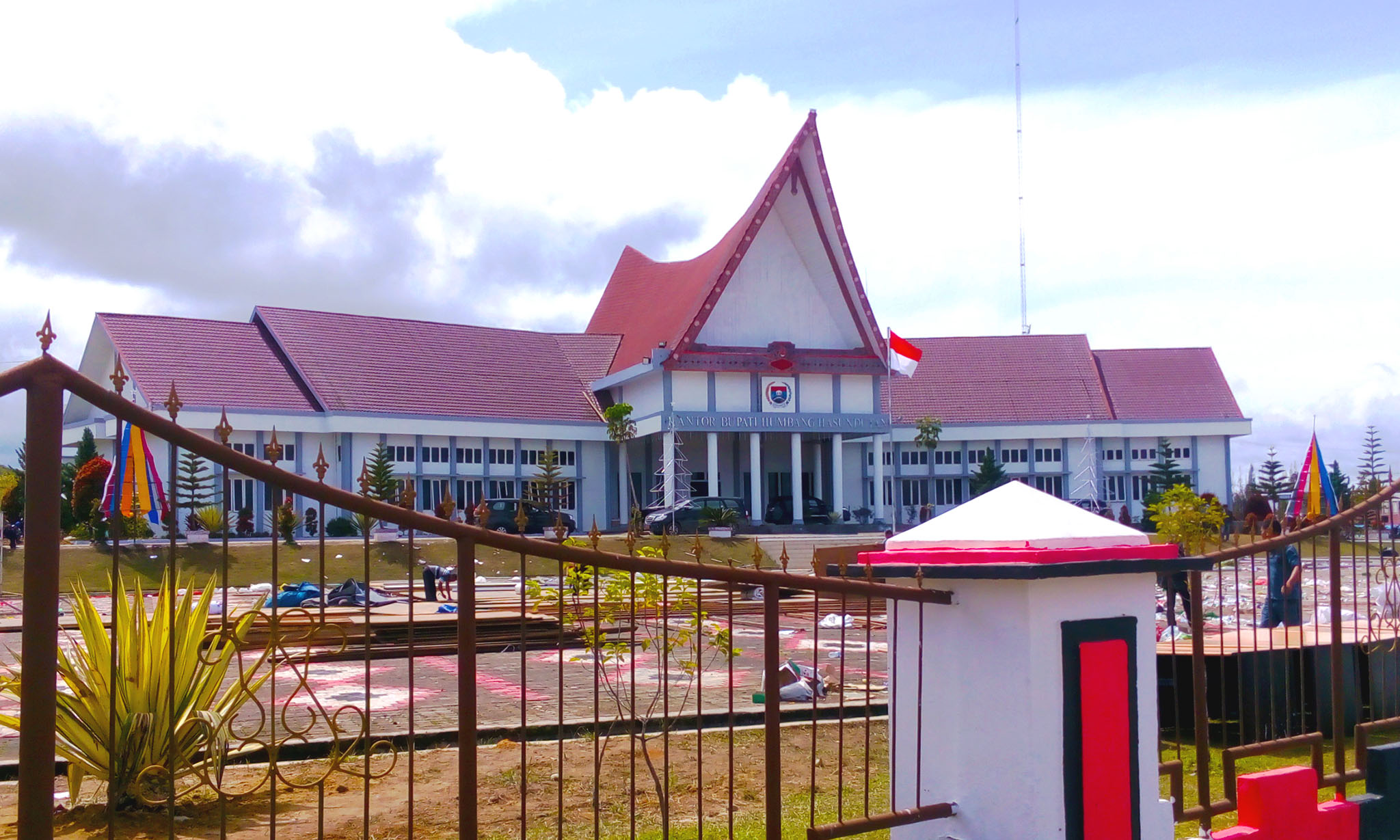
A government building in Dolok Sanggul

Dolok Sanggul is a town in North Sumatra province of Indonesia and it is the seat (capital) of Humbang Hasundutan Regency.

== Notable peoples ==
- Ghozali Siregar, is an Indonesian footballer who plays for Persita in the midfield position, he has also played for PSM Makassar and Persib in the Indonesian Super League (now Liga 1 (Indonesia)).
- Friedrich Silaban, is a famous Indonesian architect. His most famous designs, such as the Istiqlal Mosque and the Gelora Bung Karno Main Stadium in Jakarta, were commissioned during Sukarno's presidency
