= Maludin Simbolon =

Indonesian military personnel (1916–2000)

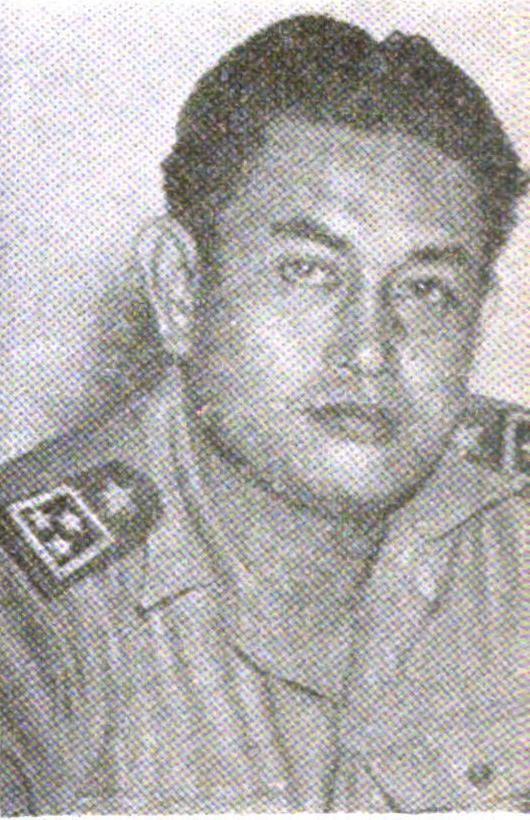
- Born: 13 September 1916; Tarutung, North Tapanuli Regency
- Died: 2000 (aged 83–84)
- Spouse: Pariyem
- Children: 5
- Military career
- Allegiance: Empire of Japan (1942–45); Indonesia (1945–61)
- Branch: Indonesian Army
- Service years: 1942–1961
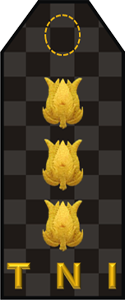
- Rank: Kolonel

PRRI Minister of Foreign Affairs
- In office February 1958 – September 1961

Commander of Kodam I/Bukit Barisan
- In office 1950–1956
- Preceded by: office established
- Succeeded by: Djamin Ginting

Colonel Maludin Simbolon (13 September 1916 – 2000) was an Indonesian military officer, independence fighter, and Minister of Foreign Affairs in the Revolutionary Government of the Republic of Indonesia's (PRRI) Cabinet.

== Background ==
Maludin Simbolon was the second of ten children of his parents, Julius Simbolon and Nursiah Lumbantobing. His father worked as a plantation foreman in Pearaja, Tarutung, North Tapanuli Regency.

Simbolon took his basic education at a Hollandsch-Inlandsche School Siantar Narumonda, then continued at Chr. Hollandsch Inlandsche Kweekschool (teacher school) Solo, Central Java, and graduated in 1938. There he met his future wife Paniyem in Solo, and from their marriage they had five children.

Before the outbreak of World War II, he had taught as a teacher at HIS Solo, and also in Curup, Bengkulu.

== Military career ==
Simbolon entered Giyūgun (義勇軍 giyūgun, voluntary army) training during the Japanese occupation, and afterward graduated as a Second Lieutenant. He was later assigned to the Gyugun battalion headquarters in South Sumatra, in the education and training section.

Immediately after the Proclamation of Indonesian Independence, People's Security Army (TKR) was formed and he was appointed Commander of the Palembang Ulu Division, with the rank of Colonel. In a reorganization of TKR forces in Sumatra, Simbolon was appointed Commander of Division I / Lahat (1945–46), who supervised 4 regiments and 15 battalions in South Sumatra. When TKR was changed into the Republic of Indonesia's Army (TRI), Simbolon became Commander of the Garuda VII Division in South Sumatra, which oversaw Lampung, Bengkulu, Palembang, and Jambi.

During the Second Dutch Military Aggression, the Emergency Government of the Republic of Indonesia was formed in Sumatra, in which A.K. Gani became military governor and Maludin Simbolon became the deputy. In 1950, he was appointed commander of the Bukit Barisan Territorial-I Army Command, which was formed in conjunction with the formation of the North Sumatra Province which included Aceh, North Tapanuli, South Tapanuli, West Sumatra, and East Sumatra.

== PRRI involvement ==
Maludin Simbolon was among the regional leaders in Sumatra and Sulawesi, who were dissatisfied with various central government policies in the late 1950s. Some of the demands desired by the regional leaders were improvement of soldier welfare, greater regional autonomy, and replacement of some of the civil and military officials in Jakarta.

Simbolon later joined the Revolutionary Government of the Republic of Indonesia (PRRI), and announced the termination of the North Sumatra military region's relationship with the central government on December 22, 1956, in Medan, although remained loyal to leadership of the duumvirate Sukarno-Hatta. The Ali Sastroamidjojo Cabinet in Jakarta that night also held an emergency meeting, and in the morning President Sukarno announced Simbolon's removal from his position and appointed his deputy, Lieutenant Colonel Djamin Ginting, to secure the situation. Also mentioned that Lt. Col. Abdul Wahab Makmoer was to be the next commander, should Lt. Col. Gintings fail the effort.

Fast movements of troops led by Lt. Col. Gintings were immediately able to control important positions in Medan. The Central government then sent paratroopers deployed in Medan to support Gintings' forces, so the troops loyal to Simbolon backed away from fighting to the north of Medan, then to Balige, Central Tapanuli. Simbolon and the troops loyal to him then continued the guerrilla resistance and coordinated with other PRRI forces under Lt. Col. Achmad Husein in Bukittinggi. Besides Medan, the central government also deployed paratroopers and landed troops from the sea in Palembang and Padang, to effectively control the PRRI resistance in Sumatra.

On July 27, 1961, Maludin Simbolon with his staff and the troops of "Pusukbuhit Division" surrendered formally to the Commander of Kodam II, Lt. Col. Manaf Lubis in Balige, thus ending their resistance to the central government.

== Death ==
Maludin Simbolon died in 2000, aged 84 years old.

== See also ==
- Revolutionary Government of the Republic of Indonesia (PRRI)
