= Revolutionary Government of the Republic of Indonesia =

Revolutionary government in Sumatra (1958–1961)

Revolutionary Government of the Republic of Indonesia Pemerintahan Revolusioner Republik Indonesia
- 1958–1961
- Flag

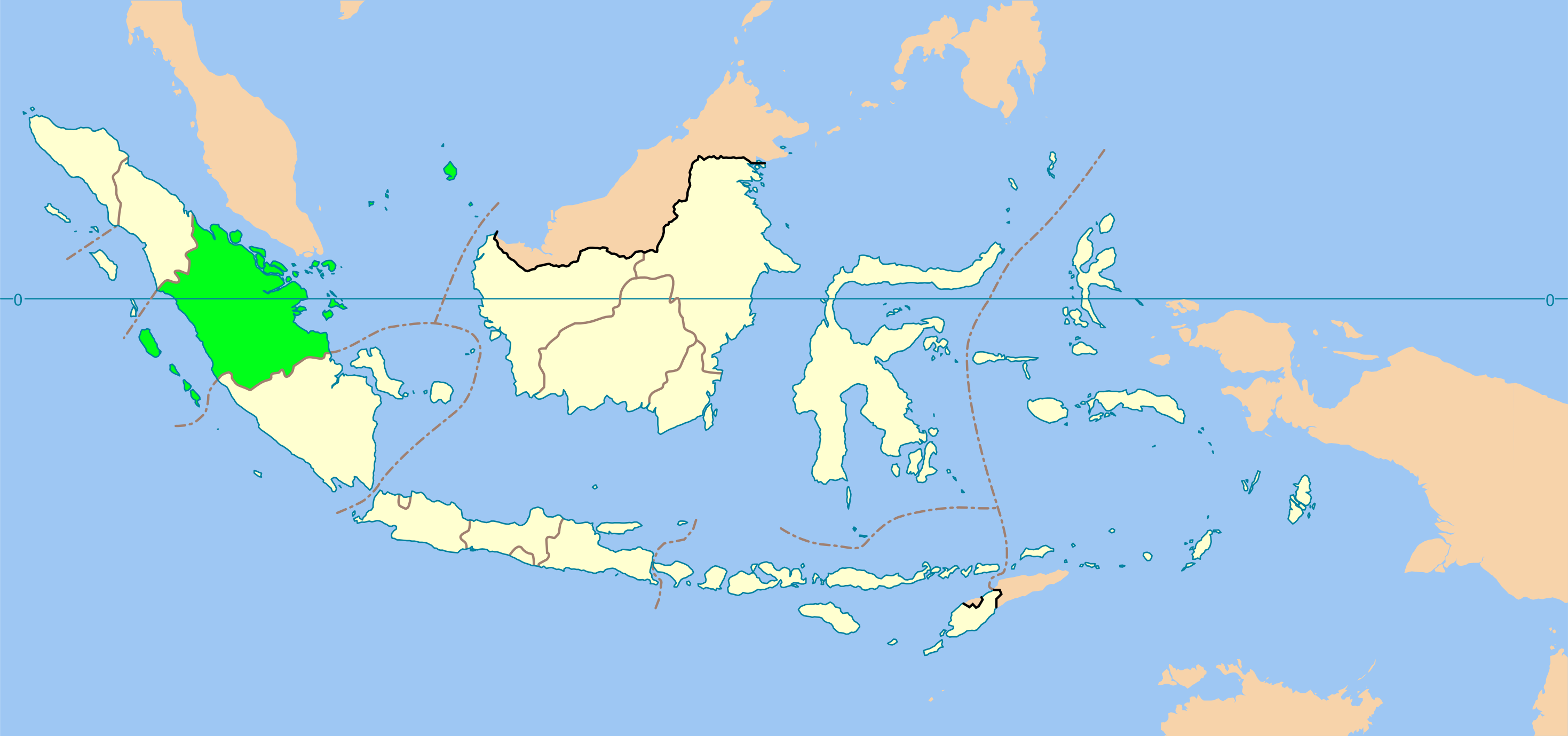
- Central Sumatra province, which was under PRRI control in February 1958
- Status: Unrecognized rival government-led quasi-state
- Capital: Padang (until 17 April 1958); Bukittinggi (17 April 1958-4 May 1958); Kotto Tingi (4 May 1958-July 1960)
- Language: Indonesian
- Government: Revolutionary republic (parliamentary)
- Prime Minister
  - 1958–1961: Sjafruddin Prawiranegara
- Historical era: Cold War
  - Established: 17 February 1958
  - Disestablished: 28 September 1961
Preceded by	Succeeded by
Liberal democratic government	Guided democracy government
- Today part of: Indonesia

The Revolutionary Government of the Republic of Indonesia (Indonesian: Pemerintahan Revolusioner Republik Indonesia, abbr. PRRI) was a revolutionary government set up in Sumatra to oppose the central government of Indonesia in 1958.

Although frequently referred to as the PRRI/Permesta rebellion, the Permesta rebels were a separate movement in Sulawesi, that had pledged allegiance with the PRRI on 17 February 1958.

== Background: Rebellion of the colonels ==
Prior to the establishment of the PRRI, there were several "rebellions" led by the various regional Army commanders in Sumatra. These events were the result of growing dissatisfaction with the Central Government and Indonesia's faltering economic development. The Central Government was seen by some in the outer islands (i.e. outside of Java) as disconnected from the Indonesian people. Some Army commands in the outer islands began covert smuggling operations of copra and contraband items to improve their financial position. These operations were soon followed with requests for greater economic and political autonomy from the Central Government in Jakarta. After their demands were not met they began to rebel against the government, conducting a series of bloodless coups within their regional command areas, and setting up alternative local government systems. The rebel army commands included:

- Dewan Banteng (Banteng Council) in Central Sumatra which on 20 December 1956 under the leadership of Lieutenant Colonel Ahmad Husein (Commander of the 4th regiment of the Territorial Army in Sumatra) began to take over the local government of Central Sumatra.
- Dewan Gajah (Elephant Council) in East Sumatra which on 22 December 1956 under Colonel Maludin Simbolon (Supreme Commander of the Territorial Army in Sumatra) began to take over the local government in East Sumatra and cut all relations with the Central Government.
- Dewan Garuda (Garuda Council) in South Sumatra which on 15 January 1957 under Lieutenant Colonel Barlian took over the local government of South Sumatra.
- Dewan Manguni (Manguni Council) in North Sulawesi which on 20 December 1956 under Lieutenant Colonel Ventje Sumual took over the local government of North Sulawesi.

Governor Roeslan, who yielded powers to Lieutenant Colonel Ahmad Husein, said that:

"The Banteng Council in particular and the people of Central Sumatra in general have no wish to build a State within a State, because relations between the Regional and the Central Government of the Republic of Indonesia will certainly return to normal when there is a Cabinet that can eliminate all the feelings of confusion, tension and dissatisfaction that threaten the security of the Indonesian State and People."

== Ultimatum ==
The PRRI was proclaimed to have been established on 15 February 1958 by Lieutenant Colonel Ahmad Hussein following the expiration of a five-day ultimatum to the government. The ultimatum demanded for three things. First, for the Djuanda Cabinet to return its mandate. Second, for Mohammad Hatta and the Sultan of Yogyakarta (Hamengkubuwono IX) to form a cabinet until a future election. Third, for President Sukarno to return to his constitutional position.

Following the declaration, a number of government officials sent to negotiate with the Banteng Council in Bukittinggi were detained, including Minister of Agriculture Eny Karim.

== Members of the PRRI cabinet ==
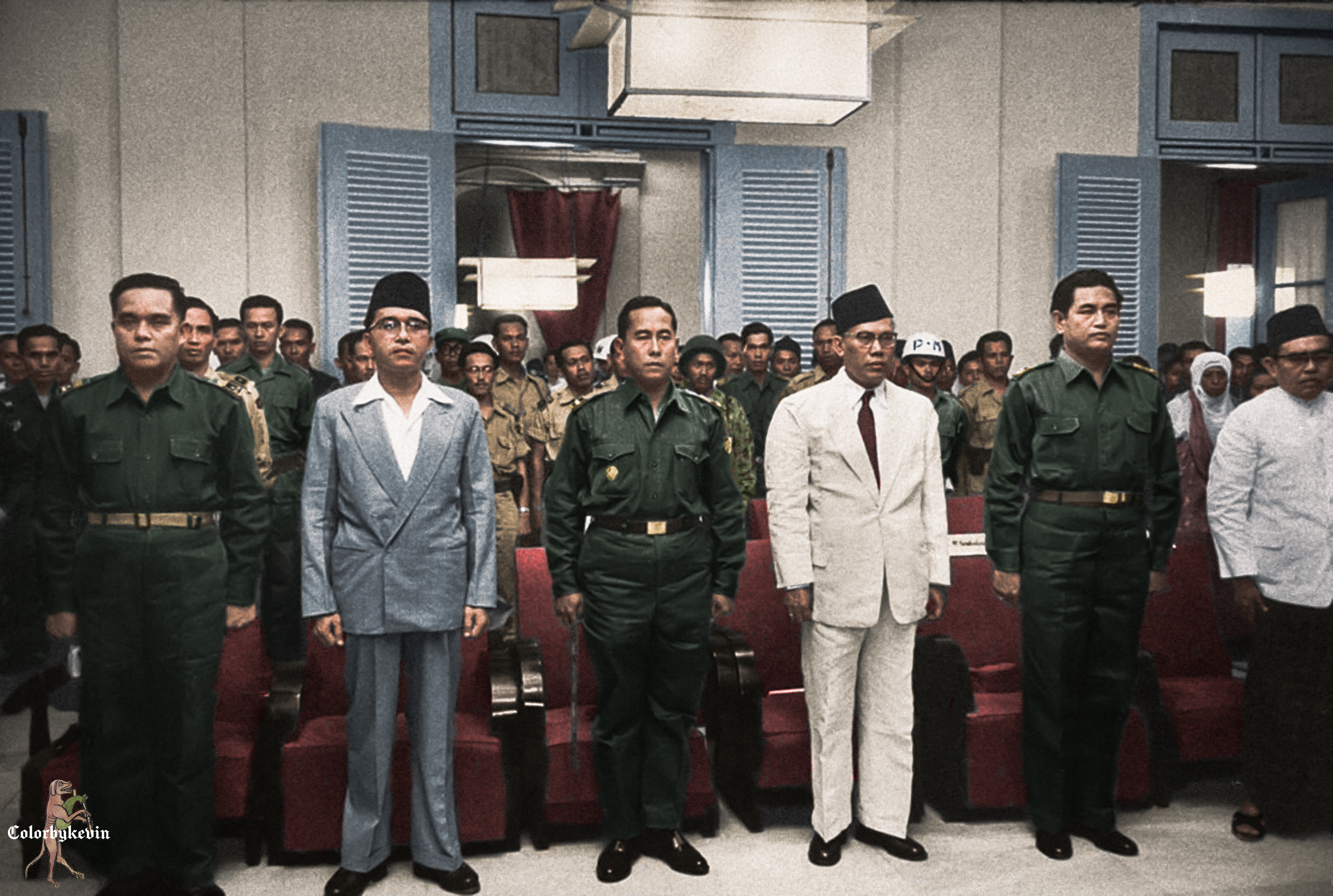
Chief members of Revolutionary Government of the Republic of Indonesia. March 01, 1958.

The Revolutionary Government of the Republic of Indonesia formed a cabinet for the revolutionary government, with Sjafruddin Prawiranegara being named as both its prime minister and finance minister.

The composition was as follows:

Position	Name
Prime Minister	Sjafruddin Prawiranegara (Note: (former Finance Minister and Prosperity Minister, head of state of Indonesia in 1948–1949))
Ministry of Foreign Affairs	Maludin Simbolon
Ministry of Internal Affairs	Assaat Dt. Mudo (Note: (Preceded by Colonel Dahlan Djambek prior to Assaat's arrival in Padang) (former president of the Republic of Indonesia during the United States of Indonesia period))
Ministry of Defence	Dahlan Djambek
Ministry of Security and Justice	Burhanuddin Harahap
Ministry of Communications	Sumitro Djojohadikusumo
Ministry of Finance	Sjafruddin Prawiranegara
Ministry of Telecommunications and Postal	Dahlan Djambek
Ministry of Trade	Sumitro Djojohadikusumo
Ministry of Information	Saleh Lahade
Ministry of Development	J. F. Warouw
Ministry of Social Affairs	Ayah Gani Usman
Ministry of Education	Muhammad Sjafei
Ministry of Health	Muhammad Sjafei
Ministry of Religious Affairs	Muchtar Lintang
Ministry of Labour and Agriculture Affairs	Saladin Sarumpaet

== Military organization ==
- Tapanuli region (Pusuk Buhit Division): lieutant colonel Oloan Sarumpaet, Maludin Simbolon, Boyke Nainggolan
- West Sumatra Region: Abu Bakar Jaar
- Riau Region: H. Abdullah Hasan
- Jambi Region: Major Ibrahim
- South Sumatra Region: Colonel Nawawi, Zakaria Kamidan

== Challenges ==
Despite the various stakeholders who had appeared to all be on the same side of resisting Central Government control to some extent, the declaration of the rebel government and the open split from the Central Government in Jakarta had immediately highlighted that not all parties were willing to take things to such an extreme. One of these unwilling parties was the Garuda Council led by Lieutenant Colonel Barlian. Even within Lieutenant Colonel Ahmad Hussein's Banteng Council, there were key leaders and segments who opposed the establishment of the PRRI. The lack of alienation from the political order of that time also meant that there was no real support or traction on the ground at all for such an open rebellion.

Giving no slack to the PRRI, the Central Government in Jakarta also moved decisively against the PRRI, arresting several of the named cabinet ministers, discharging from service military commanders who supported the PRRI and bombing key infrastructure in Sumatra.

== State symbols ==
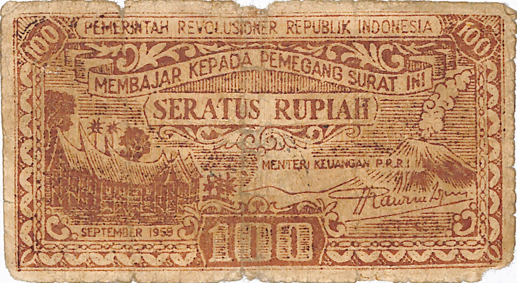
Banknote issued by the PRRI rebellion

PRRI government issued a series of banknotes from 1958 to 1960 with denominations from 5 to 1000 rupiahs.

== Legacy ==
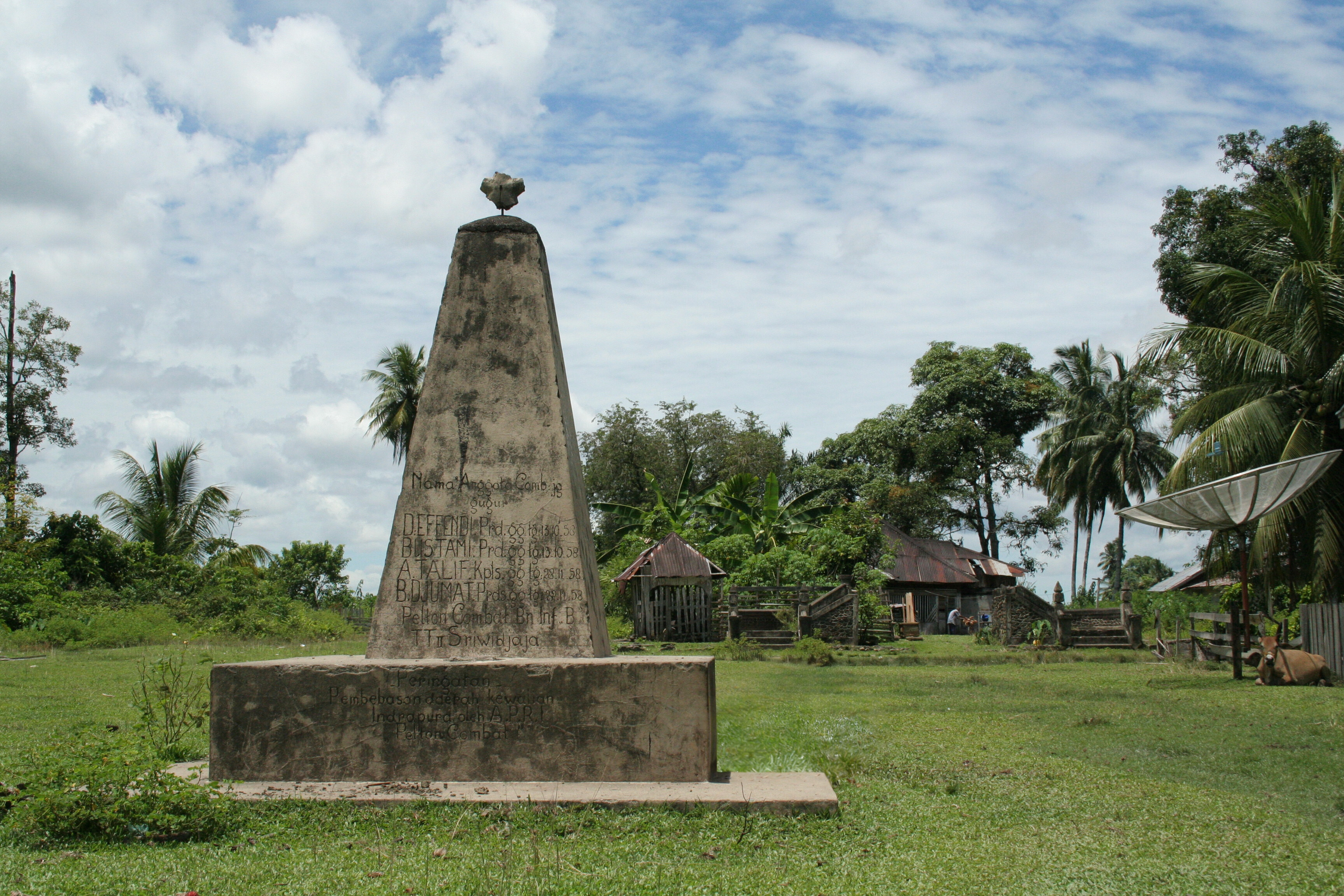
Liberation Monument erected by central government troops from Kodam II/Sriwijaya at Indrapura

One of the most significant outcomes of the conflict was the establishment of foreign relations of the Soviet Union with the Indonesian government. As the crisis had unfolded, the Indonesian government had approached the United States government for arms to combat the rebel commands. The Americans, however, had declined the Indonesian request, forcing the Indonesians to approach the Soviet Union for assistance. The Soviet Union thus became a major supplier of arms to the Indonesian government, allowing Indonesia to rapidly modernize its armed forces into one of the strongest in Southeast Asia. This had follow on effects in the West New Guinea dispute as Indonesia was able to escalate tensions in the dispute by threatening overt conflict.

Another important aspect was the influence of this event on the large exodus of Minangkabau people from Sumatra to other regions in Indonesia, along with the large psychological effects that stem from the attached stigma of being a rebel, despite the Minangkabau's determined resistance against the Dutch colonial system and the fact that many pre-independence nationalistic leaders had hailed from Sumatra. In addition to the violence committed against the local community during and after the conflict period, the humiliation and trauma of the defeat had also rocked the self-esteem and dignity of the Minangkabau people. This was especially stark In an interview with Harun Zaid, where he said "What had an impact on me was the sadness in the eyes of the students. In 1961, the faces were dull as if they did not have any future".
