= Permesta rebellion =

Conflict in Indonesia from 1957 to 1962

- Part of the Age of Gerombolan, Cold War in Asia, and the CIA activities in Indonesia
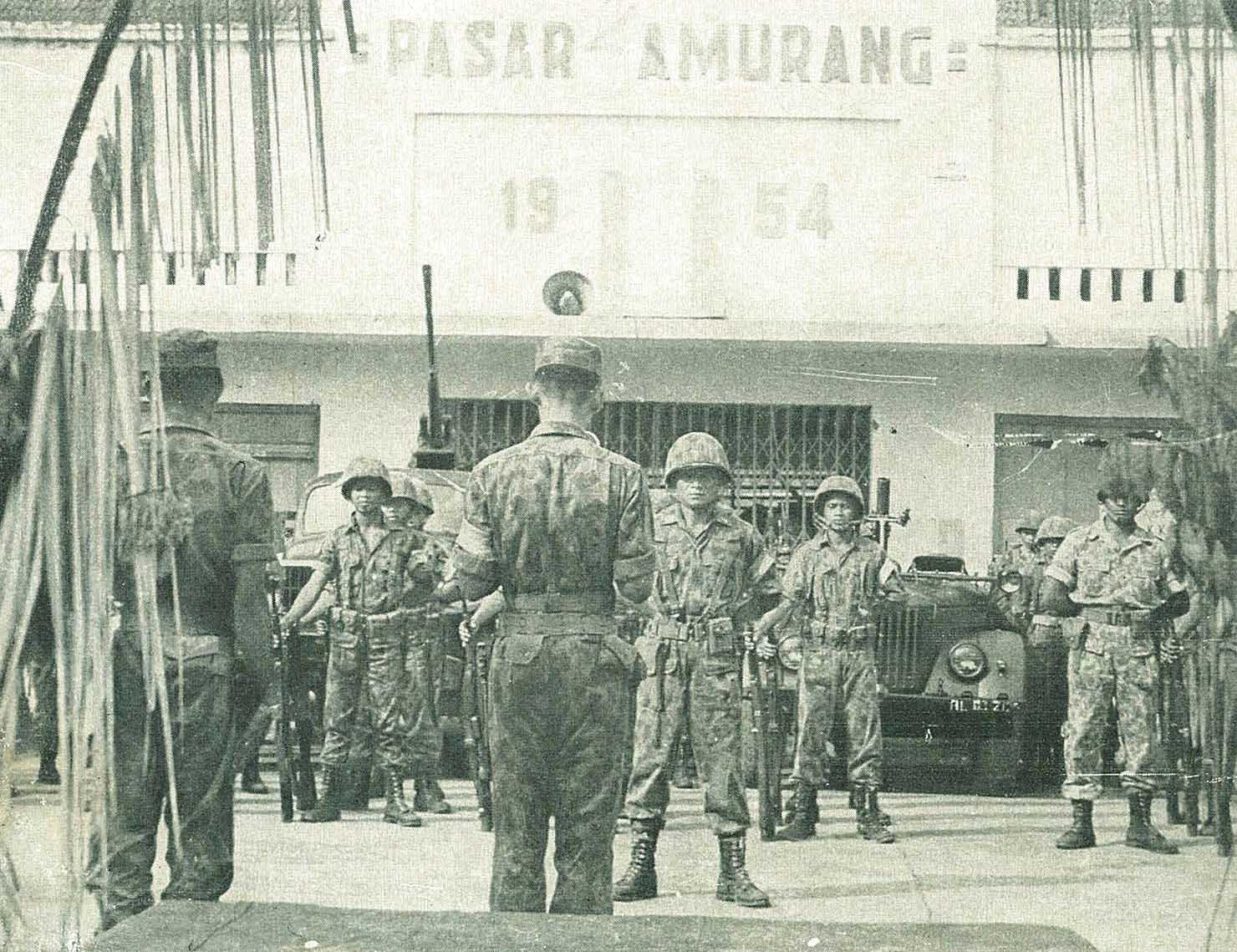
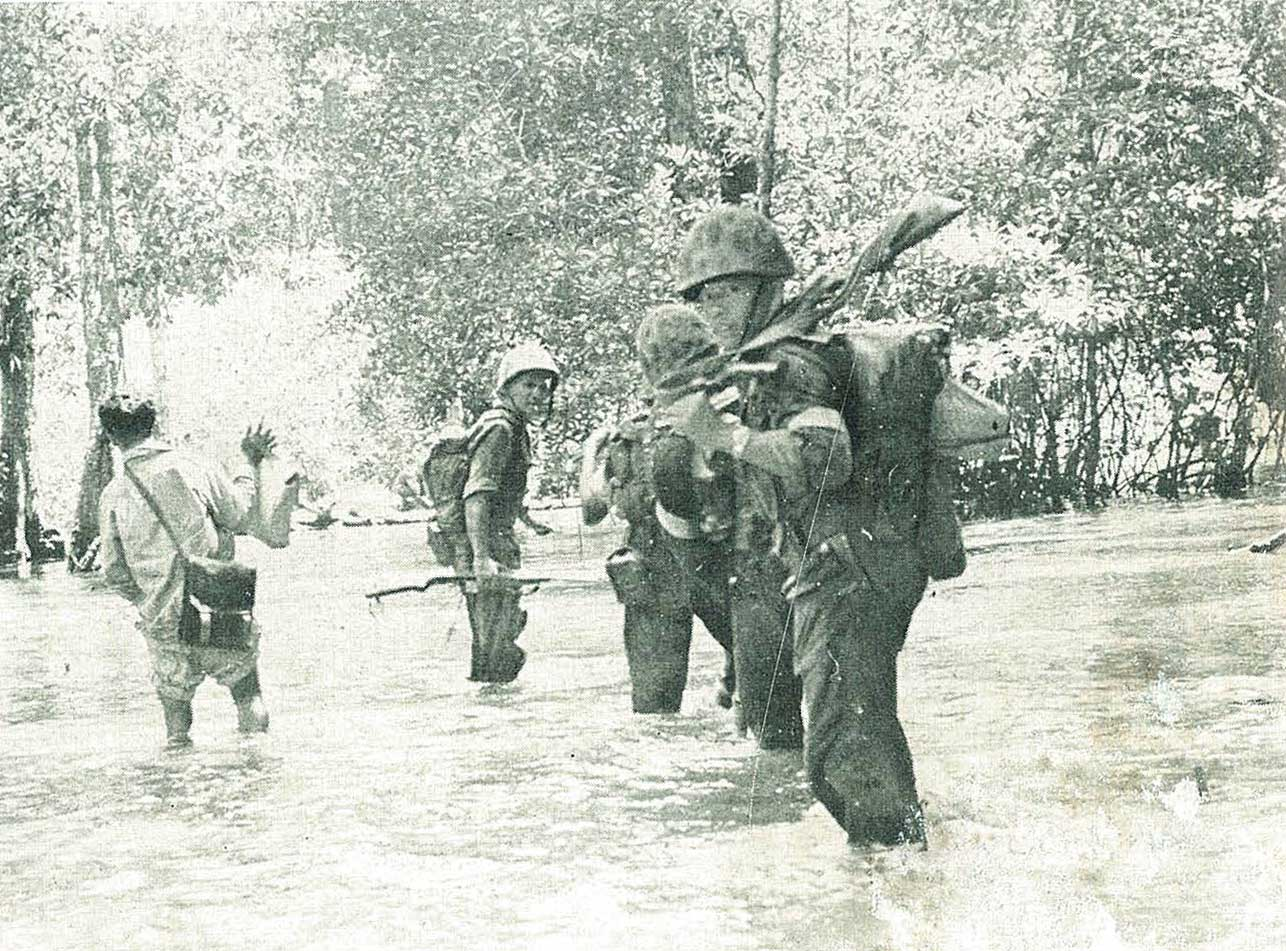
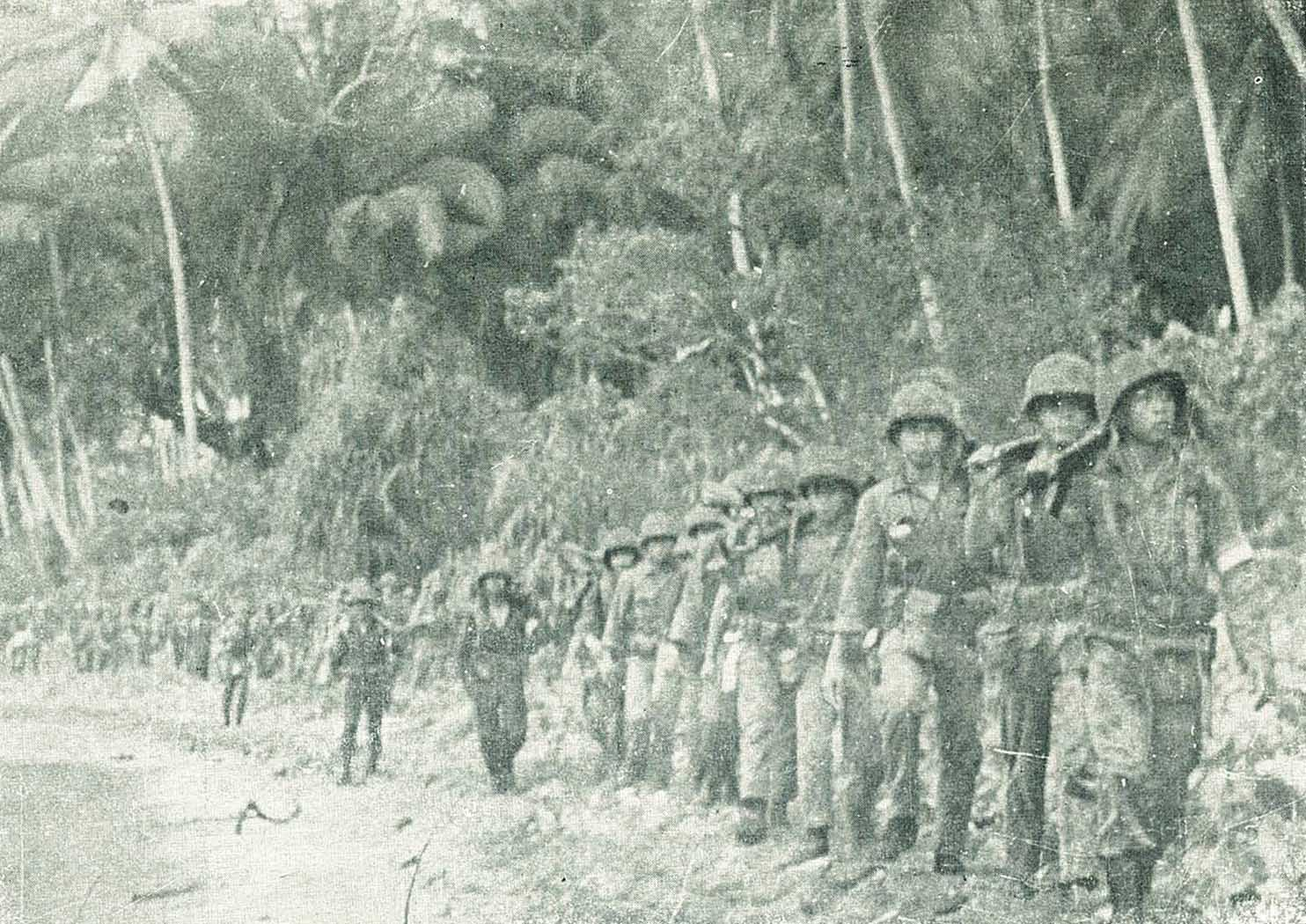
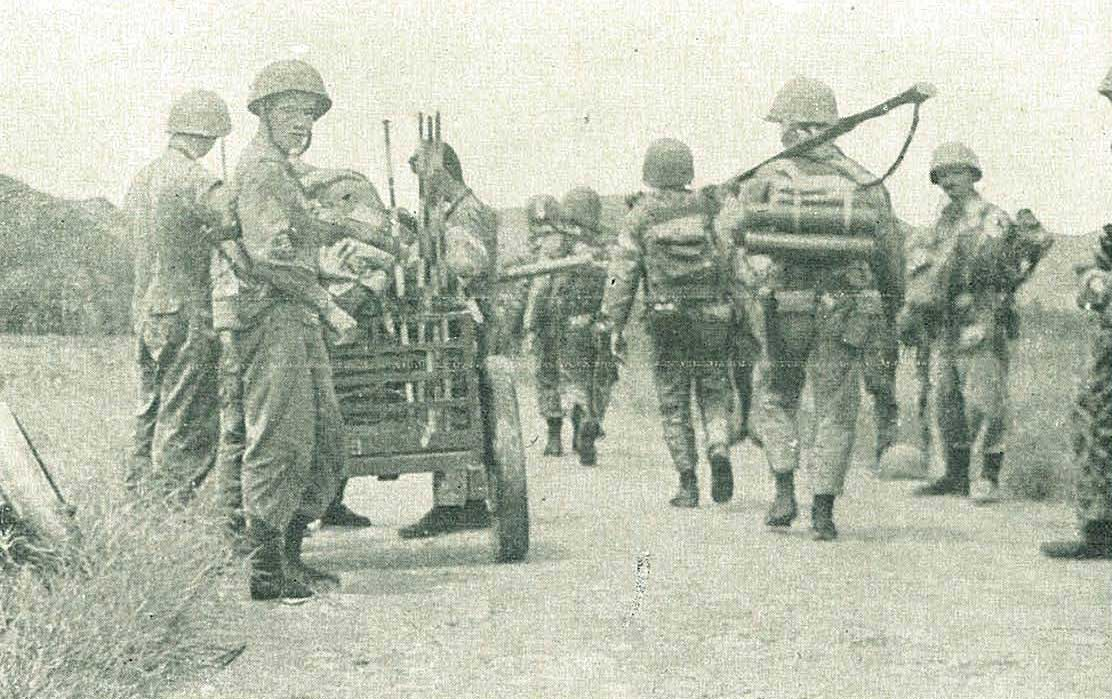
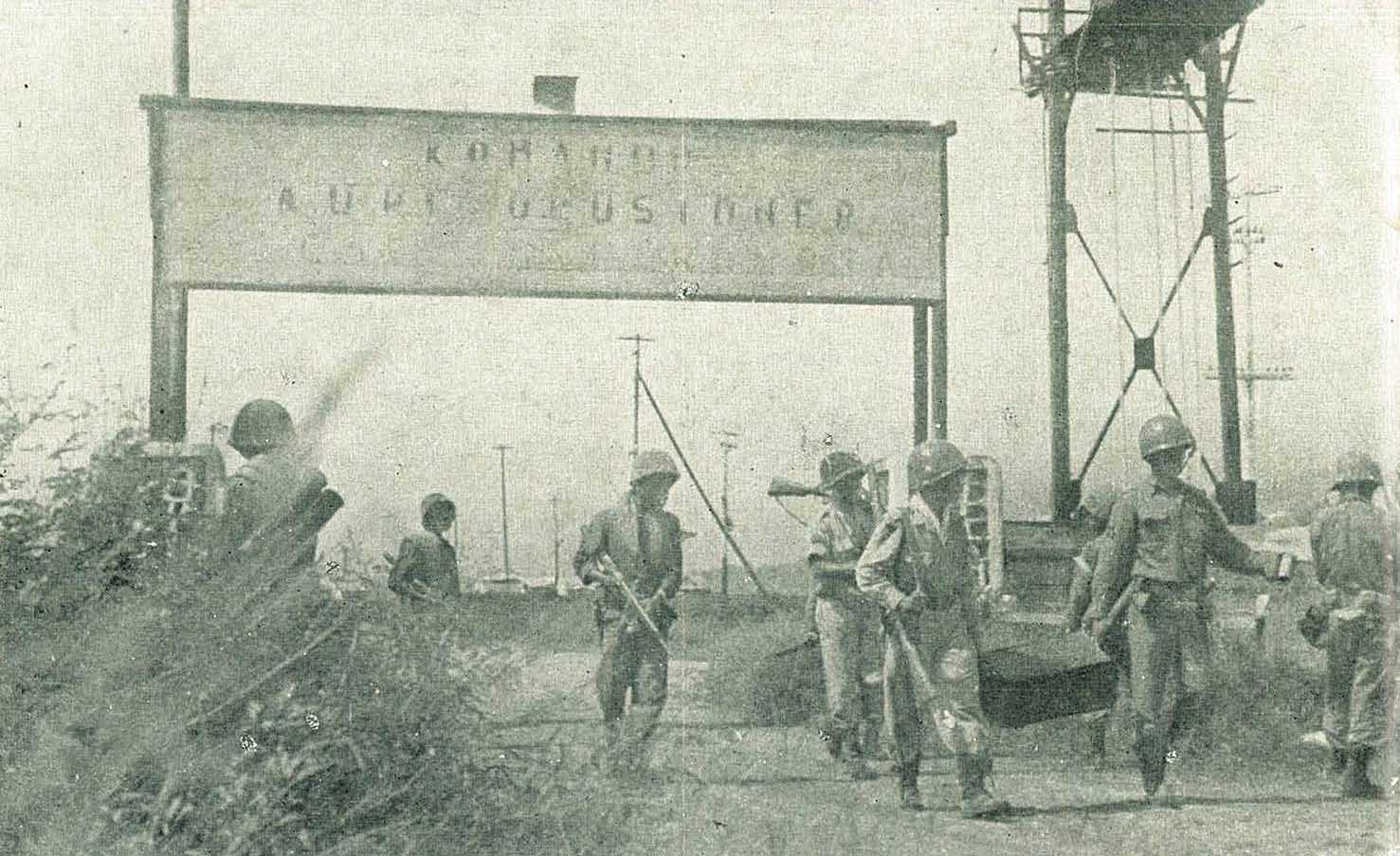
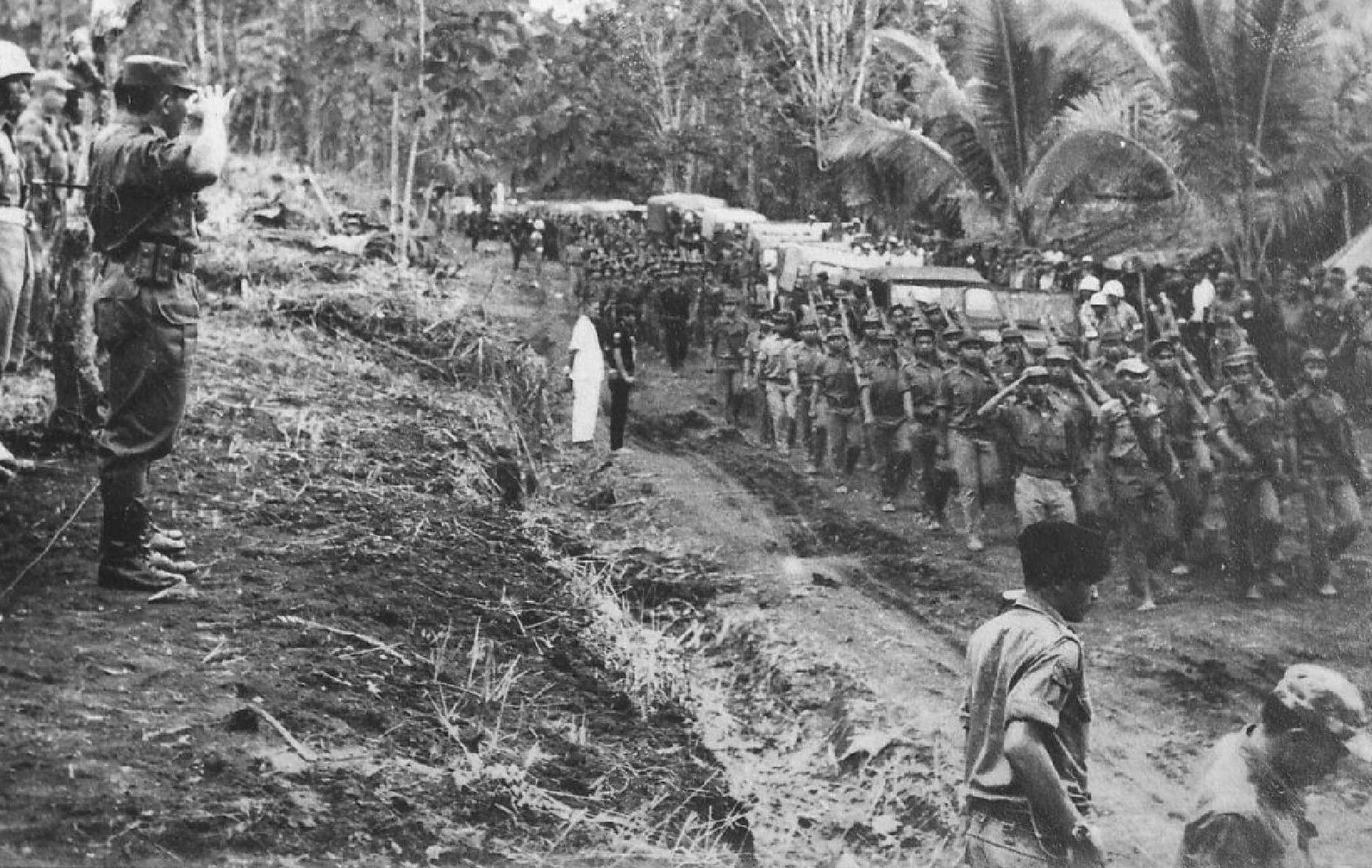
- Clockwise from top left: Indonesian Navy Commando Corps in Amurang; Indonesian Navy in swamps chasing PERMESTA troops; Indonesian marines moving toward Amurang; Col. Sunandar Prijosudarmo salutes Permesta soldiers in a military ceremony on 4 April 1961; Langowan airfield occupied by the Indonesian marines; Indonesian marines on Morotai Island
Date	22 February 1958 – 20 October 1961 (until early 1962 in North Maluku)
Location	Sulawesi, Kalimantan, and North Maluku
Result	Government victory

Belligerents
Indonesia	Permesta; Justice Defense Force (1958-1960); Darul Islam; Air support: United States (Note: in 1958)

Commanders and leaders
Sukarno; A.H. Nasution; Ahmad Yani; TB Simatupang; Omar Dhani; Djamin Ginting; Asa Bungkudapu; Herman Parimo	Alexander Kawilarang (surrendered); Ventje Sumual (surrendered); Joop Warouw (executed); Daniel Julius Somba (surrendered); Dolfedor Semuel Runturambi (surrendered); Allen Lawrence Pope (POW); William H. Beale

Units involved
TNI; TNI-AD; TNI-AL; TNI-AU; GPST (Note: until 1960)	Angkatan Perang Revolusioner (APREV); Revolutionary Air Force of Indonesia (AUREV); Pasukan Wanita Permesta (PWP); CIA

Strength
Unknown	~43.000 (1961) (United States) ~20 CIA pilots (Note: composed of American, Taiwanese, Polish and Filipino nationals); 8 B-26 Invader; 6 P-51 Mustang

Casualties and losses
4,000 dead Government source: 2,499 soldier killed 4,098 wounded 488 missing; 247 police killed 519 wounded 320 missing; 956 member of the people's defense organization (OPR) killed 611 wounded 434 missing Total: 3,702 killed, 5,228 wounded, 1,242 missing (include casualties in Permesta and PRRI rebellion)	2,000 dead Government source: 22,174 killed; 4,360 wounded; 8,072 captured; 123,917 surrender; 39,000 weapons captured (include casualties of PRRI member)
- 5,592 civilians killed 3,834 civilians wounded 2,472 civilians missing (include casualties in Permesta and PRRI rebellion); Total killed: 31,468 killed (per government source)

Permesta rebellion was a conflict between the Indonesian government and Permesta rebels from 1957 to 1962.

== Background ==
The PRRI rebellion in the west and Permesta rebellion in the east arose for a combination of reasons. Foremost was that certain ethnic groups in Sulawesi and central Sumatra felt that government policies from Jakarta were stagnating their local economies, which in turn limited any opportunities for regional development. Also, there was some animosity towards the Javanese ethnic group, who were the most numerous and influential in the newly created unitary state of Indonesia. Indonesia's political arena was centered on the island of Java and yet the country's economic resources mostly came from other islands in Indonesia. In effect this conflict was less about any thoughts of secession from the Indonesian state and more about a fair division of economic and political power in Indonesia.

== Beginning of the movement ==
=== Efforts before the declaration ===
In early 1957, both civil and military leaders from Makassar visited Jakarta. In January 1957, Lt. Col. Muhammad Saleh Lahade and Maj. Andi Muhammad Jusuf Amir (M. Jusuf) met with Chief of Staff of the Indonesian Army Gen. Abdul Haris Nasution. At that time, Lahade was Chief of Staff of the South and Southeast Sulawesi Security Command (Ko-DPSST or Komando Pengamanan Sulawesi Selatan Tenggara), while M. Jusuf was the commander of the Hasanuddin Infantry Regiment (RI-Hasanuddin). Then in February, Sulawesi Governor Andi Pangerang Pettarani met with Prime Minister Ali Sastroamidjojo and Minister of Home Affairs R. Sunarjo. Pangerang urged the central government to strive to provide greater autonomy for the local regions in eastern Indonesia. In addition to greater autonomy at the regional level, a greater share of government revenue should be given to the regions for the implementation of local development projects. Meanwhile, Lahede and Jusuf tried to urge the leadership of the Indonesian Army to similarly support greater regional autonomy and revenue sharing that would be used for local regional development. In addition, they also requested that the Ko-DPSST, which was under the direct auspices of army headquarters rather than under the Army and Territorium VII (TT-VII or Tentara dan Territorium VII) headquartered in Makassar, to be replaced with a Regional Military Command (KDM or Komando Daerah Militer).

At the end of February 1957, Andi Burhanuddin and Henk Rondonuwu left for Jakarta representing the Sulawesi provincial government as a last effort to urge the central government on the matters discussed in the previous meetings. Apart from them, the commander of TT-VII, Lt. Col. Ventje Sumual, also visited Jakarta for the same purpose and met with sympathetic officers in the military. On 1 March 1957, Sumual together with Burhanuddin and Rondonuwu returned to Makassar, because their efforts were unsuccessful. The civil and military leadership in Makassar met a few days before on 25 February 1957 to plan the declaration of Permesta in the event that there was no concrete response from the central government.

=== Permesta proclamation ===
At 3:00 am on 2 March 1957 at the governor's residence in Makassar and in front of about 50 attendees, Sumual proclaimed a state of war for the entire TT-VII region, which encompassed the entire territory of eastern Indonesia. After the proclamation, Lahade read the Universal Struggle Charter or Permesta Charter. The end of the charter stated that "first of all by convincing all leaders and layers of society, that we are not breaking away from the Republic of Indonesia, and are merely fighting for the betterment of the fate of the Indonesian people and the settlement of remaining issues of the National revolution." The charter was signed by the attendees. After the charter was read, Governor Pangerang asked everyone to remain calm and carry out their respective duties and responsibilities.

The following day, the composition of the military government was announced in which Sumual served as military administrator with Lahade as chief of staff. There was also a Central Advisory Council (or Dewan Pertimbangan Pusat) consisting of 101 members and four military governors under Sumual. The four military governors were Andi Pangerang for South and Southeast Sulawesi, Maj. Daniel Julius (D. J.) Somba for North and Central Sulawesi, Lt. Col. Herman Pieters for Maluku and West Irian, and Lt. Col. Minggu for Nusa Tenggara. At the time, Somba was the commander of the 24th Infantry Regiment (RI-24) based in Manado, Pieters was the commander of the 25th Infantry Regiment (RI-25) based in Ambon, and Minggu was the commander of the 26th Infantry Regiment (RI-26) based in Bali. Panggerang was formally appointed as military governor on 8 March, while Somba was formally appointed in Manado on 11 March.

== Response from Jakarta ==
=== Response from the central government ===
On 14 March 1957, a delegation headed by Henk Rondonuwu went to Jakarta with the intention to meet President Sukarno and Mohammad Hatta separately and brief them on the purpose of Permesta. According to the delegation's report, Sukarno seemed relieved after hearing assurances that Permesta did not intend to split from the Republic of Indonesia. Meanwhile, Hatta was impressed by the contents of the Permesta charter after reading it. On the same day, Prime Minister Ali Sastroamidjojo handed back his mandate to Sukarno, who then declared the country in a state of martial law at Nasution's suggestion. Sukarno then appointed Djuanda Kartawidjaja as the new prime minister.

Juanda formed a team to approach Sumual consisting of four high-ranking officials from Minahasa, the region in North Sulawesi where Sumual came from. The four officials were Minister of Industry Freddy Jaques (F. J.) Inkiriwang, Minister of Justice Gustaaf Adolf (G. A.) Maengkom, former Minister of Information and Indonesian Ambassador to China Arnold Mononutu, and Indonesian Ambassador to Canada Lambertus Nicodemus (L. N.) Palar. In July 1957, the four Minahasans left for North Sulawesi with the intention of meeting with Sumual, Somba, and other Permesta officials. At that time, Permesta's headquarters had moved to North Sulawesi. After meeting with Sumual on 23 July 1957, the delegation announced an agreement that included the recognition of new autonomous provinces in eastern Indonesia, one of which was the province of North Sulawesi. The two sides also agreed to establish a university in North Sulawesi.

One more thing that was agreed upon was to hold a National Conference (MUNAS or Musyawarah Nasional) to ease tensions in the regions. The conference was held between 10 and 14 September 1957 and discussed problems within the government, the economy, the military, and also the Sukarno-Hatta relationship (or dwi-tunggal Sukarno-Hatta). To continue the efforts of the conference, a seven-member committee was formed. On 27 September 1957, Sukarno visited North Sulawesi for two days and made speeches about the unity of the nation in Manado, Tomohon, and Tondano. His speech was well received by the public, but they also carried banners supporting Sumual and Permesta. In November 1957, a National Development Conference (or Musyawarah Nasional Pembangunan) was held as a follow-up to the initial conference. Unfortunately, these conferences that initially provided the possibility of solving the identified problems were, in the end, unable to produce something that all parties could agree on.

=== Response from the army leadership ===
On the same day that Permesta was proclaimed, Nasution sent radiograms to Sumual and also to Col. Sudirman who at that time was the commander of Ko-DPSST. He instructed them not to take any action that could endanger the security of the army and the people in Makassar. Sumual and Sudirman already had indirect communications and both agreed to maintain the security in the city of Makassar. In a meeting of all army and territorial commanders at army headquarters on 15 March 1957 that was attended by Sumual and Sudirman, the military governors who had been appointed the day after the proclamation were temporarily accepted.

Nasution agreed to the formation of the regional military commands as suggested by Lahade and Jusuf. These regional commands were established based on the areas of the four military governors formed after Permesta was proclaimed. The South and Southeast Sulawesi Regional Military Command (KDM-SST or Komando Daerah Militer Sulawesi Selatan dan Tenggara) was inaugurated by Nasution in Makassar on 1 June 1957. Nasution appointed Lt. Col. Andi Mattalatta as commander of KDM-SST and Maj. Haeruddin Tasning as Chief of Staff. Then on 26 June 1957, Pieters was appointed commander of the Maluku and West Irian Regional Military Command, and on 5 July 1957, Minggu was appointed commander of the Nusa Tenggara Regional Military Command. Somba was appointed commander of the North and Central Sulawesi Regional Military Command (KDM-SUT) on 28 September 1957.

With the merger of Ko-DPSST where most of the battalions came from the Army and Territorirum V/Brawijaya in Java and the formation of the KDM-SST led by officers from South Sulawesi, the wishes of Jusuf who was from South Sulawesi were fulfilled. However, the reorganization of the military structure resulted in Sumual no longer having any position in Makassar. On 4 June 1957, at a meeting of officers who supported the formation of Permesta, disagreements began to arise between those from South Sulawesi and those from North Sulawesi. Due to the loss of support from South Sulawesi officers, including Andi Pangerang, Sumual moved Permesta's headquarters to North Sulawesi at Kinilow near Tomohon. Differences of opinion on how the Permesta movement should continue could also be divided between those who were willing to go to war in order to achieve the goals of Permesta and those who did not want go to war. The division in this respect was in the same lines as where the officers came from, namely whether they were from North Sulawesi or South Sulawesi. In the 1970s, Sumual met Jusuf and on that occasion, Jusuf told Sumual, "Ven, I was just for Permesta, but you were for Permesta and war".

== Heading for a conflict ==
=== The relationship between Permesta and PRRI ===
In the same month when the National Conference was held, Sumual met with Lt. Col. Ahmad Husein and Lt. Col. Barlian in Palembang. At the time, Husein was the chairman of the Banteng Council, which was fighting for the same purpose as Permesta in West Sumatra. Meanwhile, Barlian initiated the Garuda Council with the same goal in South Sumatra. These three officers signed the Palembang Agreement Charter containing demands to the central government, including restoration of the dwi-tunggal, replacing the leadership of the army as the first step towards its stability, decentralization in the state government system that includes granting broad autonomy for the regions, and the prohibition of communism. On 9 January 1958, Sumual returned to West Sumatra near the Dareh River and met with Husein again. He also met with other movement leaders in Sumatra: Sumitro Djojohadikusumo, Mohammad Natsir, and Col. Maludin Simbolon.

After the meeting near the Derah River, Sumual left for Singapore and then continued on to Hong Kong. In Hong Kong, Sumual met Col. Joop Warouw who at that time was the Indonesian military attaché in Beijing. He previously served as commander of TT-VII before Sumual was appointed to the position. They then left for Tokyo to meet Sukarno who was in Japan at the time. The purpose of the meeting with Sukarno on 5 February 1958 was none other than to urge Sukarno to take action against the current crisis in Indonesia.

On 10 February 1958, Husein announced the Charter of the Struggle to Save the Country (or Piagam Perjuangan untuk Menyelamatkan Negara). In this charter, the central government was given five days to carry out the demands stated in the charter, which required Djuanda to return his mandate to Sukarno and "national figures" Hatta and Hamengkubuwono IX to form a National Cabinet that was "clean of anti-God elements".

With the expiration of the deadline, on 15 February 1958, a Council of Struggle (or Dewan Perjuangan) in Padang announced the formation of the Revolutionary Government of the Republic of Indonesia (PRRI or Pemerintah Revolusioner Republik Indonesia). The full name of the Council of Struggle was the General Struggle Council of the Indonesian People Who Desire for the Independence of the State and the Nation (or Dewan Perjuangan Umum Seluruh Rakyat Indonesia yang Mengingini Kemerdekaan Negara dan Bangsa). The cabinet formed for this new government included Sjafruddin Prawiranegara as Prime Minister, Simbolan as Minister of Foreign Affairs, and Djojohadikusumo as Minister of Transportation and Shipping. From Permesta, Warouw was appointed Minister of Development, Lahade was appointed Minister of Information, and Mochtar Lintang was appointed Minister of Religion. Meanwhile, Sumual was appointed Commander of the PRRI Army. Sumual acknowledged the appointment of members from Permesta in the PRRI Cabinet, but he did not give direct approval prior to the announcement.

=== Differences in responses in South Sulawesi and North Sulawesi ===
In Manado, Somba had to respond to the news about the formation of the PRRI. As the commander of KDM-SUT, he had to choose whether to cut ties with the government in Jakarta and side with PRRI. Some of his staff including Maj. Jan Willem "Dee" Gerungan, Abe Mantiri, and Capt. Lendy Tumbelaka urged Somba to side with PRRI. Sumual at that time was still abroad in Manila. On 16 February 1958, a rally took place at the Sario field in Manado. In the end, Somba chose what the people attending the rally called for and what his staff urged him to do, which was to cut ties with the government in Jakarta. Somba was dishonorably discharged by the army after his statement. Sumual and Lahade were also dishonorably discharged on 1 March 1958. Warouw also joined Permesta and he was dishonorably discharged on 6 May 1958.

In Makassar, the response to the formation of the PRRI was not the same as in Manado. The signatories of the Permesta Charter who were from South Sulawesi gradually stopped supporting the movement. Signatories such as Jusuf (commander of RI-Hasanuddin), Mattalatta (commander of KDM-SST), and Pangerang (military governor of South and Southeast Sulawesi) started siding with the central government. However, Lahade, Lintang, and several other civilian leaders still sided with Permesta. After escaping outside the city of Makassar, on 27 May 1958, Lahade and Lintang were arrested. They were held in Makassar until September 1957, then taken to Denpasar in Bali and then to Madiun in East Java where they were held until 1962.

=== The bombing of Manado ===
The central government carried out a bombing raid of Manado six days after Somba's statement. At 8:15 am on 22 February 1958, two B-25 Mitchell bombers from the Indonesian Air Force (AURI) targeted the radio station in the city. The bombing in Manado hastened the decisions of two Minahasan officers who were initially not enthusiastic about joining Permesta. They were Warouw who had joined Sumual to meet Sukarno in Tokyo and Col. Alexander Evert (A. E.) Kawilarang who at that time was the military attaché in Washington, D.C. Kawilarang was an experienced officer in the Indonesian Army who previously commanded three military territories: TT-I/Bukit Barisan in Medan, TT-III/Siliwangi in Bandung, and also TT-VII before Warouw and Sumual.

The bombing also resulted in the people of North Sulawesi being more enthusiastic to the Permesta cause. Two days after the bombing, KDM-SUT announced and instructed former soldiers of the Royal Netherlands East Indies Army (KNIL or Koninklijk Nederlands Indisch Leger) to report and join Permesta. It is estimated that around 2000 of them self-reported. Even though they were old because KNIL was formed during the Dutch occupation, they could train younger inexperienced enlistees who joined Permesta. The training was held in Langowan near Tondano for three months, which resulted in the formation of seven companies from the number of youth who were trained. In addition, a female unit was formed and was named the Permesta Women's Troops (PWP or Pasukan Wanita Permesta).

=== Foreign involvement ===
During 1957, the United States became increasingly concerned that Indonesia was becoming vulnerable to communism due to the rising influence of the Indonesian Communist Party. In January 1958, the CIA began developing covert support networks to the PRRI and Permesta rebels. Meetings between the CIA and Sumual as well as Nun Pantouw, who was assigned by Sumual to manage the bartering of copra sent directly from Sulawesi to abroad, took place several times in Singapore and Manila. After hearing about the AURI attack on Manado, Sumual rushed back to Manado with Pantouw on a chartered Consolidated PBY Catalina. Sumual realized that the CIA were willing to provide assistance after he was greeted in front of the chartered plane by Brig. Gen. Pelagio Cruz who was the coordinating director of national intelligence for the Philippines. He said the cargo that had been loaded at the rear of the plane could be considered as "American goodwill". This goodwill consisted of six M2 Browning .50 caliber machine guns. Afterwards, arms shipments carried out by sea included small arms, hand grenades, ammunition, and multi-crew weapons.

Greater CIA support was seen with the dispatch aircraft that made up the Permesta air force called the Revolutionary Air Force (AUREV or Angkatan Udara Revolusioner) based in Manado, an air force formed by Permesta in order to seize and control Indonesian airspace. The aircraft sent were 15 B-26 Invader bombers and some P-51 Mustang fighters. In addition to the aircraft, the CIA sent pilots, mechanics, aircraft weaponry, and spare parts. Weapons also came from Taiwan, but in the case of Taiwan, Permesta had to pay for the weapons. The first shipment by a PBY Catalina was in the form of 100 rifles and three M20 recoilless rifles. Taiwan then sent a ship containing weapons the amount of which could be used by soldiers in several battalions and anti-aircraft guns. In addition, the agreement with Taiwan included two Beech C-45 transport planes accompanied by three chartered pilots. In all, foreign personnel consisted of an international cast of CIA agents and mercenaries from Taiwan, the Philippines, Poland, and the United States.

=== Attacks by the AUREV ===
Emboldened by the CIA aid, the AUREV began a series of airstrikes against cities in Sulawesi and Maluku. The cities bombed by CIA-piloted insurgent planes included Ambon, Balikpapan, Makassar, Palu, and Ternate. At 3:00 am on 13 April 1958, an AUREV B-26 bomber departed from Mapanget airport (now Sam Ratulangi International Airport). Its destination was Mandai airport (now Sultan Hasanuddin International Airport) in Makassar. They reached their destination at 5:30 am and bombed and fired on the runway for 15 minutes. Then on 16 April 1958, the C-45 aircraft purchased from Taiwan departed from Kalawiran airfield, an airfield constructed by the Dutch that was located near Langowan. The destination of the C-45 aircraft was the airfield in Balikpapan. Apart from the bombing of the runway, an AURI transport plane was also destroyed. On 20 April 1958, B-26 bombers from Mapanget attacked Palu. The next day, the bombers accompanied by two P-51 fighter planes attacked the air base located on Morotai Island (now Leo Wattimena Airport). In addition, the second target was the air base at Jailolo on Halmahera Island. Over the next several days, airstrikes were again carried out on these sites with the addition of Ternate.

On 28 April 1958, ports in Donggala (near Palu) and Balikpapan were again attacked. In Donggala, the foreign flagged commercial ships SS Flying Lark, SS Aquila, and SS Armonia were sunk and in Balikpapan, the SS San Flaviano was sunk. In addition, the Indonesian Navy (ALRI) corvette RI Hang Tuah was also sunk in which 18 crew members died and 28 were seriously injured. At the time of the attack, the warship had just left Balikpapan for East Java to join the fleet that was preparing to attack the Permesta stronghold in North Sulawesi. The Indonesian government alleged that on 15 May 1958, a marketplace was bombed in Ambon city that killed a large number of civilians.

=== Operasi Jakarta ===
On 26 April 1958, Sumual led troops transported by several ships from Manado to Morotai with the aim of seizing the air base there. Sumual had instructed the AUREV to attack Morotai by air before Sumual and his troops arrived. The attack was carried out by a B-26 bomber piloted by Allen Pope who had just arrived in Manado from the Philippines. A P-51 fighter also participated in the attack. After arriving in Morotai the night before, at 6:00 am the next day, the troops led by Sumual began their attack. The air base was guarded by only a few AURI soldiers and police who immediately surrendered without a fight. Sumual left a company in Morotai and proceeded to Halmahera. They met no resistance and managed to occupy Jailolo and its air base.

The attack on Morotai was actually the first stage of a planned assault that Sumual called Operation Jakarta. Operation Jakarta I was to seize the air base at Morotai. Then Operation Jakarta II was to reclaim the area around Palu, with Operation Jakarta III targeting Balikpapan and the southern part of Kalimantan. The final objective of the operation was to attack Jakarta. Sumual assessed that the success of this military operation would convince the military officers of TT-IV/Diponegoro in Central Java and TT-V/Brawijaya in East Java who were sympathetic to the Permesta cause to support it, because one of Permesta's aims was to restore the dwi-tunggal Sukarno-Hatta as president and Vice President.

On 8 May 1958, Somba began Operation Jakarta II by recapturing Parigi near Palu with the assistance of the AUREV. Previously on 18 April 1958, the TNI troops had captured Parigi as well as Donggala and Palu in Operation Insjaf.

=== The capture of Allen Pope ===
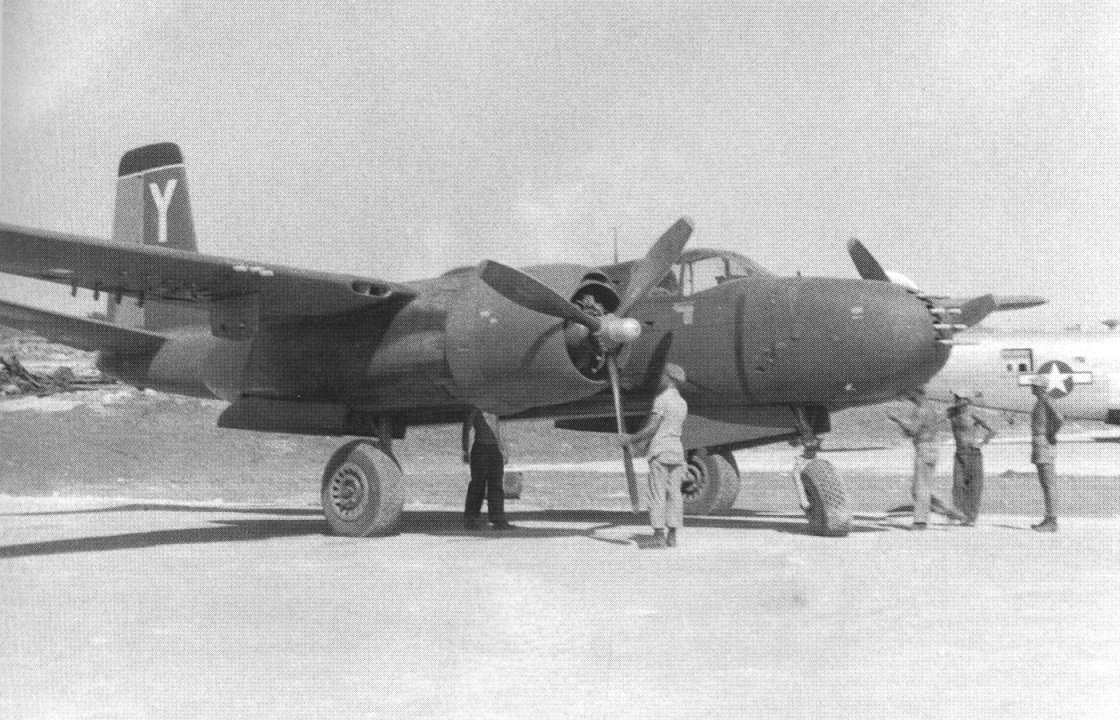
An USAAF B-26 Invader, similar to the aircraft piloted by Allen Pope

During April and early May 1958, AUREV attacks continued including on Ambon and Kendari. The AUREV had absolute control over the air in eastern Indonesia. Apart from the main airfield in Mapanget, Permesta controlled the airfields in Jailolo, Kalawiran, Morotai, Tasuka (a seaplane base on Lake Tondano), and Tolotio (now Jalaluddin Airport). However, Permesta's successes began to cease in mid-May 1958.

On 18 May 1958, Pope and radio operator Harry Rantung departed on a B-26 bomber to Ambon to bomb its airfield. After bombing the runway, because there was still one more bomb left, Pope tried to find the ALRI fleet that had come to re-occupy the Halmahera islands. After the fleet was located, Pope focused his attack on the transport ship RI Sewaga. He did not see the pursuit of a P-51 fighter piloted by Capt. Ignatius Dewanto. Dewanto shot at Pope's B-26 as Pope was preparing his plane for a bombing run. The shots damaged the plane's starboard wing. Meanwhile, shots from the ships hit the bottom of the plane. The plane then started to catch fire and Pope yelled at Rantung to jump out. When Pope jumped out his leg hit the tail of the plane. Pope and Rantung descended by parachute and landed on the edge of Hatata Island located west of Ambon. They were located by local residents who were accompanied by several marines from RI Sewaga led by Lt. Col. Huhnholz.

Two days later, CIA personnel in Mapanget received orders from the Philippines to leave Manado. It was not known if Pope was dead or had been captured. The official statement about Pope by the Indonesian government was only released on 27 May 1958. Before Pope's disappearance, the United States government had started to consider a change in policy towards the situation in Indonesia. They concluded that there were still high-ranking military officers in the TNI who opposed the communist movement, such as Lt. Gen. Ahmad Yani, and hence support for the Indonesian government could still be justified. At a seminar on Permesta at the University of Indonesia in 1991 that attended by the US Ambassador to Indonesia, Sumual commented that the United States helped Permesta to secure its own interests. When later it stopped supporting Permesta and in turn helped the generals in Jakarta, that was also to secure its own interests.

=== Operation Nunusaku ===
A few days before Pope was shot down and the CIA withdrew its assets from Mapanget, an AURI operation called Operation Nunusaku was carried out to destroy AUREV aircraft. Five P-51 fighter planes, four B-25 bombers, and one PBY Catalina were assembled for this operation. Before the attack was carried out, the planes flew to several airfields around Ambon in the late afternoon to avoid the AUREV attacks that were usually carried out earlier in the day. At 4:00 am on 15 May 1958, the planes set out for their target. Some went to Mapanget, while the others went to Kalawiran. In Mapanget, they carried out an attack under command of Leo Wattimena in which the B-25s bombed the runway and P-51s fired and strike on parked AUREV aircraft. A rocket hit a PBY Catalina on the ground and it immediately caught on fire. After the attack, the remaining AUREV planes that were still functioning at Mapanget were only one B-26 bomber and one P-51 fighter. Meanwhile, the attack on the Kalawiran airfield destroyed the two C-45 transport planes originating from Taiwan.

On 9 June 1958, AURI planes returned to attack Mapanget airfield. The P-51 fighter planes came from Morotai (which had fallen back into the hands of the TNI). However, this attack did not produce results like the previous attack. This time the defense at Mapanget with anti-aircraft guns was better prepared. Two AURI P-51s were shot down in which one pilot was killed.

=== Operation Mena ===
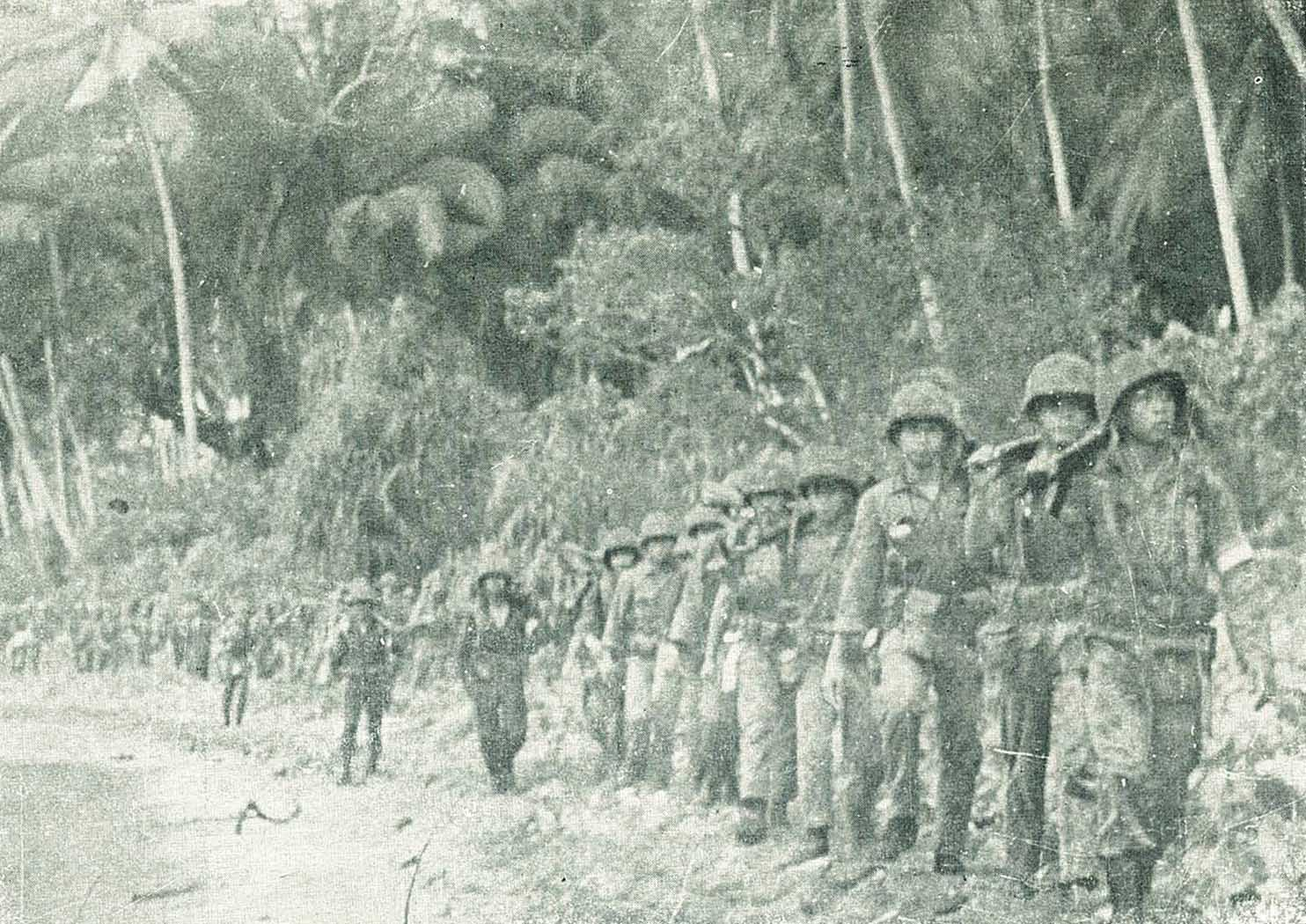
Indonesian marines on Morotai Island

Operation Mena was part of a joint operation called Operation Merdeka that was ordered by the central government to crush the Permesta rebellion. Operation Mena itself, which consisted of Operation Mena I and Operation Mena II, aimed to secure the Halmahera Islands. Operation Mena I was led by Pieters to recapture Jailolo, while Operation Mena II was led by Holnhulz to recapture Morotai. On 27 May 1958 in a press conference held in Jakarta, Pieters stated that around 400 Permesta soldiers had been surrounded in Jailolo and had received an ultimatum to surrender. Pieters was in Jakarta at the time to transport Allen Pope who was caught in Ambon. Meanwhile, Holnhulz retook Morotai on 20 May 1958. Holnhulz was part of the Amphibious Task Force 21 (ATG-21 or Gugus Tugas Amphibi 21) that consisted of two troop transports RI Sawega and RI Baumasepe, and five minesweepers. The marines landed and attacked in the early hours of the morning, followed by Fast Action Troops (PGT or Pasukan Gerak Cepat) that parachuted in from a transport plane.

=== Operation Sapta Marga ===
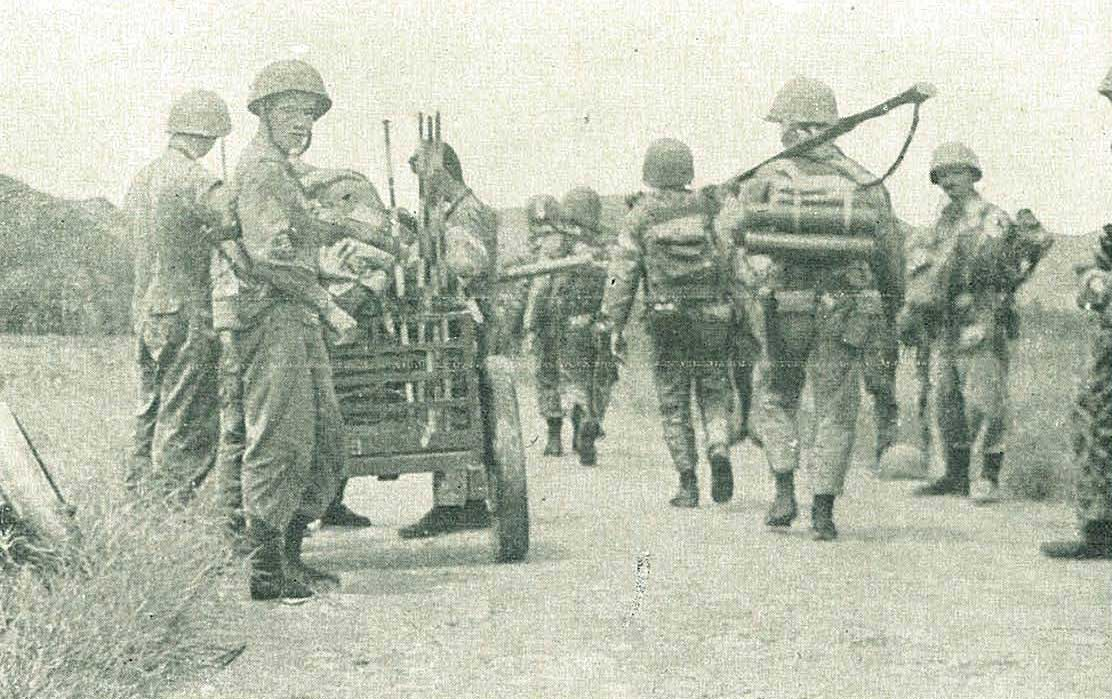
Indonesian marines moving toward Amurang

Operation Sapta Marga was also part of Operation Merdeka. Operation Sapta Marga itself consisted of four separate operations aimed at recapturing areas in North and Central Sulawesi. Operation Sapta Marga I was led by Lt. Col. Sumarsono to retake Central Sulawesi. Operation Sapta Marga II was led by Maj. Agus Prasmono to retake Gorontalo including Tolotio airfield and to provide support for guerrillas led by Nani Wartabone who had sided with the central government. Operation Sapta Marga III was led by Lt. Col. Ernst Julius (E. J.) Mangenda to retake the Sangihe and Talaud islands north of Manado. Operation Sapta Marga IV was led by Lt. Col. Rukmito Hendraningrat to reclaim Permesta's main base in North Sulawesi.

Operation Sapta Marga II succeeded in recapturing Gorontalo in mid-May 1958 with the help of Nani Wartabone after the area was previously captured by Permesta troops from Wartabone on 17 March 1958. On 19 February 1958, Somba had divided KDM-SUT into two regiments. Sector I/Black Snake covering Sangihe and Talaud, Minahasa, and Bolaang-Mongondow that led by Maj. Dolf Runturambi and Sector II/Anoa covering Central Sulawesi led by Gerungan. Somba himself and three battalions left for Central Sulawesi in April 1958 to try to reclaim the Palu and Donggala areas. However, with the fall of Gorontalo, Somba became separated from his base in Minahasa in North Sulawesi and was forced to travel back to Minahasa through areas already controlled by the TNI. This trip took two months and many of his troops fell victim to both disease and enemy attacks. Unfortunately, Gerungan and 200 soldiers under him chose to head south. This would prove to be fatal for Gerungan as he joined the rebellion instigated by Abdul Kahar Muzakkar. In 1965, Gerungan was arrested, tried, and executed. Meanwhile, Operation Sapta Marga III successfully secured Sangihe and Talaud on 21 May 1958.

Operation Sapta Marga IV is often called Operation Merdeka itself, because it was the largest operation that focused on the main base of Permesta in North Sulawesi. On 1 June 1958, a fleet departed Java for North Sulawesi. This fleet consisted of 17 navy ships and 10 ships from the government-controlled national shipping company PELNI and Djawatan Pelajaran (DJAPEL). The warships that participated in this fleet were the destroyer RI Gadjah Mada and the corvettes RI Hasanudin, RI Pattimura, and RI Pattiunus. In addition, there were troop transports RI Sawega and RI Baumasepe, and warships RI Baruna and RI Biscaya, and tankers RI Pladju and RI Tjepu. Six minesweepers were also part of the fleet. In terms of troops, the number of troops involved in this operation was 16 battalions. These battalions came from, among others, TT-II/Siliwangi, TT-IV/Diponegoro, TT-V/Brawijaya, and TT-XIV/Hasanuddin.

The attack on North Sulawesi began on 13 June 1958, where two platoons of the Indonesian Army Commando Regiment (RPKAD or Resimen Para Komando Angkatan Darat) (now Kopassus) carried out landings and reconnaissance 12 kilometers north of Manado. Ironically, the idea for the formation of the RPKAD came from Kawilarang (and fellow officer Slamet Riyadi). Previously on 8 June 1958, Manado was bombarded by ALRI warships. Meanwhile, the AURI attacked Mapanget airfield as well as Tomohon and Tondano on 11 and 13 June 1958. Then on 16 June 1958, a larger landing force consisting of one marine and two infantry battalions was made at Kema, which is about 30 kilometers southeast of Manado. The landings were supported by ALRI warships that were part of the Amphibious Task Force 25 (ATG-25) led by Lt. Col. John Lie, the commander of RI Gadjah Mada.

Sumual had correctly anticipated that the landing would take place at Kema and led the defense there himself. However, he was injured when a mortar exploded nearby forcing him to retreat to Manado. The defense at Kema was quickly overcome by the landing TNI troops. In addition to heading to Manado, TNI troops also moved towards Bitung, which had a port. Bitung was captured two days later. At the same time, RPKAD troops attacked Mapanget airfield to neutralize its air defenses. Permesta troops managed to hold back the RPKAD, but casualties fell on both sides. There were members of the RPKAD who defected to Permesta before the fighting started, hence many in both sides knew each other. Kawilarang himself personally knew one of the RPKAD soldiers, a sergeant major, who died during the attack. They had been on the same patrols in Java while searching for Muslim extremists.

=== Fierce fighting in Minahasa ===
Map of the Operation Pukul in the Minahasa peninsula from 1958 to 1961

Map of operations in Central Sulawesi against Permesta in 1958

Although the defense of Permesta was overcome by TNI troops at the time of landing, the resistance on the road to Manado was fiercer. Permesta troops fought with heavy machine guns and field guns firing 60 mm mortars. This resistance slowed down the movement of the TNI to reach Manado. The same thing happened with the RPKAD troops and infantry moving to Manado from the north. Additional troops landed at Wori north of Manado on 21 and 24 June 1958 to support the existing TNI troops. This situation also forced the TNI leadership to focus all troops on capturing Manado instead of the original plan in which some troops would immediately move to Tondano and Tomohon. After eight days of fierce resistance, on 24 June 1958, Warouw ordered the evacuation of the city of Manado and the Permesta headquarters was moved to Tomohon. Two days later, TNI troops were able to enter Manado without resistance, because Permesta troops had evacuated the city. With the fall of Manado, the Permesta leadership changed their strategy to guerrilla resistance.

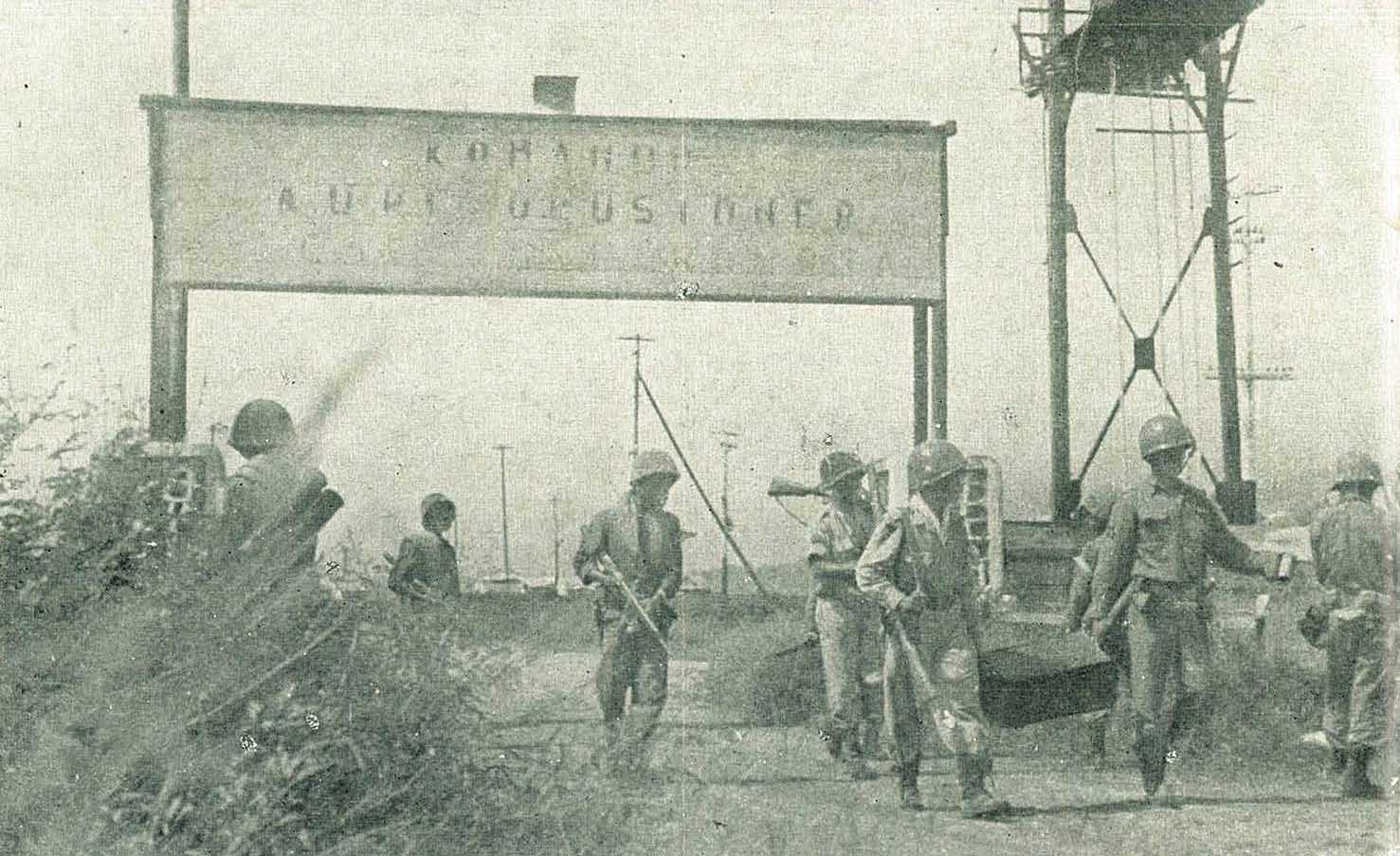
Indonesian marines occupying the Langowan airfield

It was almost a month before TNI troops were able to seize Tondano, which was the second largest city in Minahasa, on 21 July 1958. Then it took another month before Tomohon could be captured on 16 August 1958. The struggle for Tomohon was assisted by a local Permesta commander, Maj. Eddy Mongdong. He contacted the TNI troops in Tondano who were preparing to attack Tomohon and stated that he and the 1,500 soldiers in his sector were willing to surrender. A few days later Langowan and Kalawiran were occupied on 20 August 1958. The marines who participated in the capture Langowan were part of Operation Mega that began on 19 August 1958. Then a month later, Operation Nuri was carried out between 19 and 25 September 1958 with the aim of controlling the area between Langowan, Amurang, and also Motoling.

The TNI had occupied towns and areas surrounding major transportation roads, while the remaining areas including the mountains were still controlled by Permesta. This situation remained for almost a year starting in September 1958. The resistance by the Permesta troops that followed were small scale guerrilla attacks. Several larger battles also took place. For example, between 17 and 19 February 1959, a large-scale attack was carried out by Permesta troops called Operation Jakarta Special. The attacks were carried out simultaneously in Amurang, Kawangkoan, Langowan, and Tondano. These attacks almost repelled the TNI in several places, but also claimed the lives of around 100 Permesta soldiers. Although unsuccessful, the attacks proved that Permesta's forces were still determined to resist.

=== Rifts in Permesta ===
Although resistance continued, it could not be denied that the situation in the Permesta camp was getting worse. Because they had to carry out guerrillas, Sumual, Kawilarang, Warouw, and Somba were all based in different locations. Communication and coordination among them became increasingly difficult in addition to commanding their respective troops. Commanders in various sectors were becoming more difficult to control by their superiors and there were also clashes between units of the troops. Disagreements were also seen up to the top between Kawilarang and Sumual. Unfortunately, Warouw, who usually mediated between Kawilarang and Sumual, was captured by troops led by Jan Timbuleng in April 1960. Timbuleng had led a group that carried out a rebellion in South Minahasa even before the start of Permesta. Timbuleng surrendered in March 1957 and was subsequently merged into Permesta. After it was discovered that Warouw was held hostage by Timbuleng, Timbuleng himself was detained by Sumual. To anticipate this, Timbuleng ordered his men to execute Warouw if he was caught. The execution took place sometime in October 1960. The killing of Warouw was a black chapter in the Permesta struggle that caused mutual suspicion among fellow troops and the deterioration of cohesiveness within the Permesta camp.

== Resolution ==
=== Efforts for peace ===
The effort to reconcile the Permesta camp with the central government was carried out almost simultaneously by two people: Albertus Zacharias Roentoerambi (A. Z. R.) Wenas and Frits Johannes (F. J.) Tumbelaka. Wenas at that time was the chairman of the Christian Evangelical Church in Minahasa (GMIM or Gereja Masehi Injii di Minahasa). Wenas called on both sides to lay down arms and find a way for peace in his sermons, letters, and radio broadcasts. In October 1959, he met with Kawilarang to discuss possible peace with the central government. He also met Warouw in Remboken. In addition, he wrote a letter to President Sukarno containing proposals for achieving peace.

In October 1959, Tumbelaka contacted Col. Surachman who was then the commander of TT-V/Brawijaya to discuss the situation in North Sulawesi. Tumbelaka himself had served as a senior officer at TT-V/Brawijaya and also participated in the war for independence in East Java with Somba and Warouw. During his meeting with Tumbelaka, Surachman expressed his concern over the growing influence of the Indonesian Communist Party (PKI) in East Java and that the war against Permesta had drained the TNI, which was advantageous for the PKI. After several meetings with other Brawijaya staff, they agreed to send Tumbelaka to Manado to try to establish contact with Somba. Although Warouw had a higher position in Permesta, it was Somba who led the most experienced troops who had defected from the TNI.

=== Negotiations ===
On 5 January 1960, Tumbelaka left for Manado. After meeting officials from TT-XIII/Merdeka, he was met by Samuel Hein "Tjame" Ticoalu. Tumbelaka asked Tjame to enter the Permesta area and bring a message to Somba which partly read "to find a good solution to the ongoing problem". Tjame managed to meet with Somba and give the message from Tumbelaka. At that time Kawilarang was also there with Somba. They both sent a message to Warouw about what Tumbelaka had to say. At that time, Warouw himself was trying to meet Sumual to discuss his meeting with Wenas.

The first meeting between Tumbelaka and Somba took place in the village of Matungkas near Airmadidi on 15 March 1960. This meeting was followed by meetings attended by other Permesta leaders besides Somba, such as Mantiri and Lendy Tumbelaka (Tumbelaka's cousin). These meetings lasted until the end of 1960. Important discussion topics conveyed from the Permesta camp included regional autonomy, what would happen to the troops after an agreement is made, and what would be done about the situation of communism in Indonesia. The negotiations took time, because everything had to be agreed upon by both parties. It was equally important that every negotiation decision made was conveyed to the commanders on the field. From the central government side, several actions were taken to demonstrate their seriousness in the ongoing negotiations. At the start of negotiations in March 1960, a presidential decree was announced regarding the division of the province of Sulawesi into two new provinces, one of which was the province of North and Central Sulawesi with the capital in Manado. Then at the end of 1960, Nasution gave a speech that was broadcast by Radio Republik Indonesia in Manado about the importance of the Indonesian state returning to the 1945 Constitution and Pancasila.

On 17 December 1960, a meeting between Tumbelaka, Mantiri, and Arie Supit agreed on concrete steps to end the rebellion. The measures would include a plea from the Minister of Defense for the Permesta troops to return to the arms of the motherland and a statement from the Permesta camp declaring they were ready to return, where they would agree to honor a ceasefire, participate in technical meetings on organizing Permesta troops after the ceasefire and in a troop inspection ceremony to be conducted by the Minister of Defense.

=== Return to the arms of the motherland ===
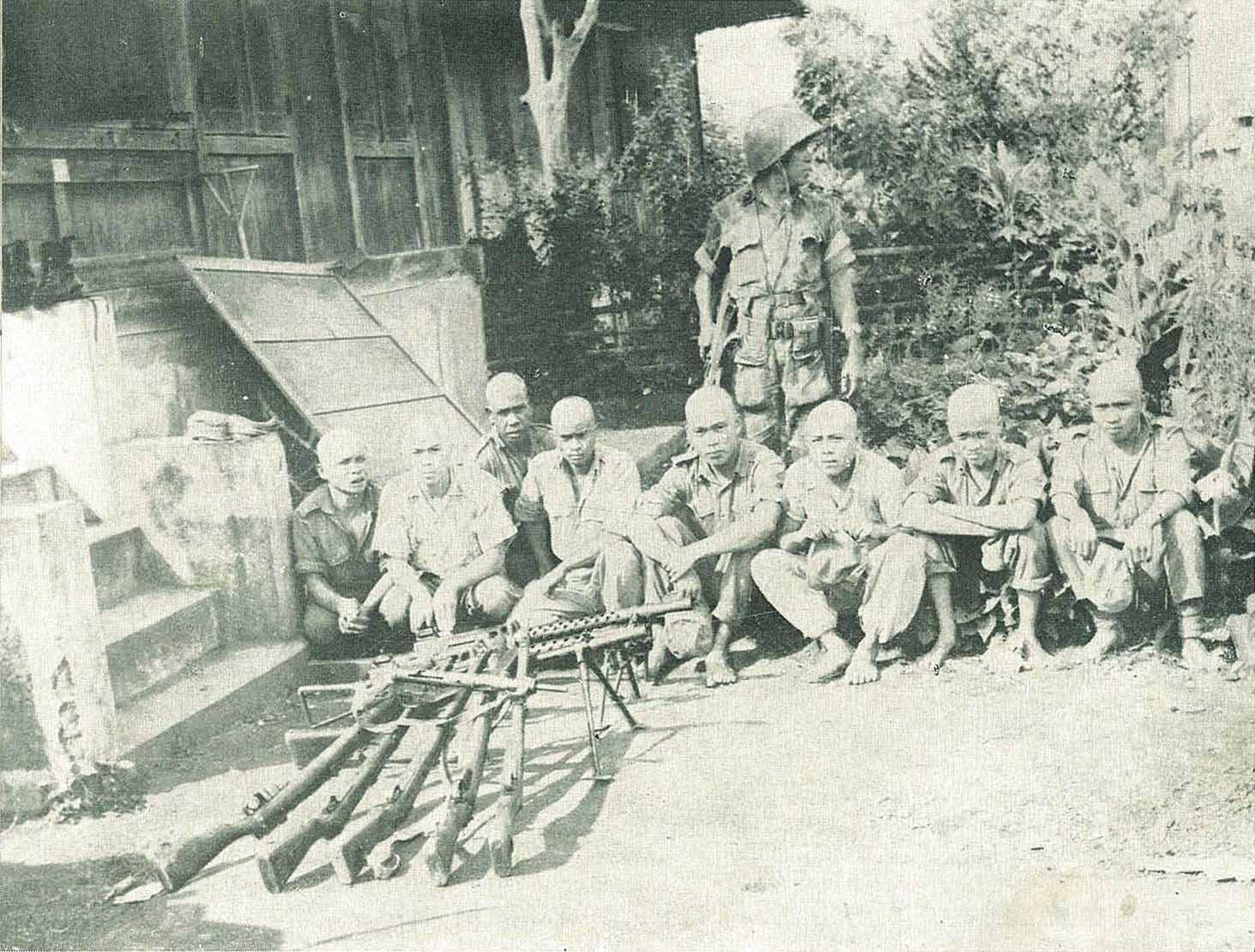
Surrendered Permesta troops

The first group of Permesta troops who responded to the call to stop the resistance was not the troops under Somba's leadership, but the troops under the leadership of Laurens Saerang, who at that time was the head of the Minahasa region and the leader of the Manguni Brigade. On 15 February 1961 in Langowan, a military ceremony was held to mark the return of the Manguni Brigade and other Permesta groups under the leadership of Saerang. The ceremony was attended by the commander of Kodam XIII/Merdeka Col. Sunandar Priyosudarmo and the deputy chief of staff of the Army, Maj. Gen. Ahmad Yani. Other troops who surrendered that day included the PWP and soldiers from five guerrilla bases in the Kakas and Langowan areas.

It was only on 4 April 1961 that the troops under Somba surrendered. Somba's surrender was marked by the signing of a statement between Somba and the commander of Kodam XIII/Merdeka in the village of Malenos (near Amurang). In addition to Priyosudarmo, the head of the police of North and Central Sulawesi Drs. Moerhadi Danuwilogo also attended the ceremony. As for the Permesta leaders, apart from Somba, there were also Lendy Tumbelaka, Wim Tenges, and Mantiri. In the ceremony, Priyosudarmo and Somba inspected both TNI and Permesta troops. Priyosudarmo and Somba had known each other before, because they had taken courses at the Army Staff and Command School (SSKAD) (now SESKOAD) at the same time.

A ceremony was also held on 14 April 1961 near Tomohon, which was attended by the secretary general of the Ministry of Defense Maj. Gen. Hidayat Martaatmaja from the TNI and Kawilarang from Permesta. Also attending the ceremony were Yani and the US Embassy military attaché Col. George Benson. The peak ceremony on 12 May 1961 near Tomohon was carried out as the last step in the form of an inspection of Permesta troops by Nasution as Minister of Defense and Chief of Staff of the Army. Nasution took the opportunity to meet Kawilarang at that time.

Sumual and some remaining troops only surrendered later in the year on 20 October 1961. He decided to surrender after hearing that the President of the United Republic of Indonesia (RPI) had announced the end of hostilities with the Republic of Indonesia. RPI was formed to combine the various rebellions throughout Indonesia. The participation of Permesta in the RPI was supported by Sumual, but was opposed by Kawilarang and Warouw. The last Permesta unit led by Jonkhy Robert Kumontoy surrender in North Moluccas in early 1962 after the news of the end of the war reached him in the jungle.

=== End of the movement ===
The granting of amnesty and abolition to those involved in Permesta was officially granted with the issuance of Presidential Decree No. 322 of 1961 concerning "Granting Amnesty and Abolition to Followers of the 'Permesta' Movement Under the Leadership of Kawilarang, Laurens Saerang, and Somba who Fulfilled the Government's Call to Return into the Arms of Motherland". This presidential decree was issued on 22 June 1961. Sumual was one of those who received amnesty, but he remained imprisoned and was only released after Suharto became president.

== Bibliography ==
- Anwar, Rosihan (2006). Sukarno, Tentara, PKI: Segitiga Kekuasaan Sebelum Prahara Politik, 1961-1965 [Sukarno, Military, PKI: The Triangle of Power before Political Temptations, 1961-1965] (in Indonesian). Jakarta: Yayasan Obor Indonesia. ISBN 978-979-461-613-0.
- "Gevangen Genomen Amerikaanse Piloot naar Djakarta Overgebracht" [Captured American Pilot Transferred to Jakarta] (in Dutch). Arnhem: Arnhemsche Courant. 28 May 1958.
- Conboy, Kenneth; Morrison, James (1999). Feet to the Fire: CIA Covert Operations in Indonesia, 1957–1958. Annapolis: Naval Institute Press. ISBN 1-55750-193-9.
- Dixon, Jeffrey (2015). A Guide to Intra-state Wars: An Examination of Civil, Regional, and Intercommunal Wars, 1816-2014. Washington DC: CQ Press. ISBN 978-0-8728-9775-5.
- Gusti Fikri Noor (November 2015). "Leo Wattimena, Penerbang 'Ugal-Ugalan'" [Leo Wattimena, a Reckless Pilot]. AVIASI (in Indonesian). Tangerang: Trend Media Global.
- Hakiem, Lukman (2019). Biografi Mohammad Natsir [The Bioigraphy of Mohammad Natsir] (in Indonesian). Jakarta: Pustaka Al-Kautsar.
- Harvey, Barbara S. (1977). Permesta: Half a Rebellion. Ithaca: Cornell Modern Indonesia Project, Southeast Asia Program, Cornell University.
- Hellstrom, Leif (July–August 1999). "Air War in Paradise: the CIA and Indonesia 1958". Air Enthusiast (82).
- Henley, David (November 2007). "The Fate of Federalism: North Sulawesi from Persatuan Minahasa to Permesta". Moussons (11): 89–105. doi:10.4000/moussons.1827.
- "Sejarah Lanud: Sekilas Pangkalan Udara Sam Ratulangi" [The History of an Airbase: Sam Ratulangi Airbase.] (in Indonesian). Indonesian Air Force. 2010-01-26.
- "Indonesian Army Territorial Commanders 1950–March 1983". Indonesia (35): 109–124. April 1983.
- Jacobson, M. (2002). Cross Border Triangles and Deterritorialising Identities. Assessing the Diaspora Triangle: Migrant-Host-Home. SEARC Working Papers Series. Vol. 19. Hong Kong: South East Asia Research Series Publications.
- Jalesveva Jayamahe: Lukisan Selayang Pandang tentang Keadaan A.L.R.I. Kita dalam Usia 15 Tahun [Jalesveva Jayamahe: A Glimpse on the State of Our Indonesian Navy in the First 15 Years] (PDF) (in Indonesian). Jakarta: Jawatan Penerangan Angkatan Laut. 1960.
- Kahin, Audrey R.; Kahin, George McTurnan (1997) [1995]. Subversion as Foreign Policy: The Secret Eisenhower and Dulles Debacle in Indonesia. Seattle: University of Washington Press. ISBN 0-295-97618-7.
- Kennedy, Douglas Blake (1996). Operation Haik: The Eisenhower Administration and the Central Intelligence Agency in Indonesia, 1957–1959 (MA). Athens: University of Georgia.
- "Profil dan Sejarah / Perjuangan" [Profile and History of Struggle] (in Indonesian). Komando Daerah Militer XIV/Hasanuddin. Archived from the original on 2021-01-19.
- Komandoko, Gamal (2010). Ensiklopedia Pelajar dan Umum [General Learning Encyclopedia] (in Indonesian). Jakarta: Pustaka Widyatama.
- Liwe, Amelia Joan (2010). From Crisis to Footnote: The Ambiguous Permesta Revolt in Post-Colonial Indonesia (PhD). Madison: University of Wisconsin, Madison.
- Lundstrom-Burghoorn, W. (1981). Minahasa Civilization: A Tradition of Change. Göteborg: ACTA Universitatis Gothoburgensis.
- Mokoginta, A. J. (1964). Sedjarah Singkat Perdjuangan Bersenjata Bangsa Indonesia [A Short History of the Armed Struggle of the Nation of Indonesia] (in Indonesian). Jakarta: Staf Angkatan Bersenjata.
- Nalenan, R. (1981). Arnold Mononutu: Potret Seorang Patriot [Arnold Mononutu: A Portrait of a Patriot] (in Indonesian). Jakarta: Gunung Agung.
- Pour, Julius; Sudomo (1997). Laksamana Sudomo, Mengatasi Gelombang Kehidupan [Admiral Sudomo, Overcoming the Waves of Life] (in Indonesian). Jakarta: Gramedia Widiasarana Indonesia.
- Raditya, Iswara (8 July 2019). "Sejarah Amnesti Presiden Sukarno kepada PRRI/Permesta" [The History of President Sukarno's Amnesty to the PRRI/Permesta]. tirto.id (in Indonesian).
- Ricklefs, Merle Calvin; Nugraha, Moh. Sidik (2008). Sejarah Indonesia Modern 1200–2008 [Modern History of Indonesia 1200–2008] (in Indonesian). Jakarta: Serambi Ilmu Semesta.
- Schouten, M. J. C. (1998). Leadership and Social Mobility in a Southeast Asian society: Minahasa 1677–1983. Leiden: KITLV Press.
- Setyautama, Sam (2008). Tokoh-tokoh Etnis Tionghoa di Indonesia [Ethnic Chinese Figures in Indonesia] (in Indonesian). Jakarta: Kepustakaan Populer Gramedia.
- Soejono, R. P. (1981). Sejarah Nasional Indonesia [Indonesian Nasional History] (in Indonesian). Vol. 6. Jakarta: Departemen Pendidikan dan Kebudayaan.
- "Rebel Military Leaders Dismissed". South China Sunday Post. 2 March 1958.
- Sulu, Phill M. (2011). Permesta dalam Romantika, Kemelut, dan Misteri [Permesta in Romance, Chaos, and Mystery] (in Indonesian). Jakarta: Gramedia Pustaka Utamanya.
- Sutrisminingsih (2012). Sejarah Penumpasan Pemberontakan PRRI [The History of Crushing the PRRI Rebellion] (in Indonesian). Jakarta: Pusat Sejarah TNI.
- "Revolt in the Provinces". TEMPO. 14 August 2007.
- "Herman Nicolas 'Ventje' Sumual: Lelaki di Balik Permesta" [Herman Nicolas 'Ventje' Sumual: The Man Behind Permesta] (in Indonesian). TEMPO. 10 March 2008.
- "Indonesia: Brink of Revolt". TIME. 17 February 1958.
- "Letkol Dj Somba Umumkan Permesta Putus Hubungan dengan Jakarta" [Lt. Col. DJ Somba Announces that Permesta has cut ties with Jakarta] (in Indonesian). Tribun News. 13 September 2013.
- Turner, Barry (2017). A. H. Nasution and Indonesia's Elites. Lanham: Lexington Books.
- Usman, Syafaruddin (2010). Tragedi Patriot dan Pemberontak Kahar Muzakkar [The Tragedy of the Patriot and Rebel Kahar Muzakkar] (in Indonesian). Jakarta: Penerbit NARASI.
