= Central Sulawesi Youth Movement =

Pro-government militia in Indonesia

- Gerakan Pemuda Sulawesi Tengah
- Flag of the Central Sulawesi Youth Movement; GPST Headquarters Staff Emblem
- Leader: Asa Bungkudapu
- Founded: 5 December 1957
- Dates active: 1957–1960
- Allegiance: Republic of Indonesia
- Headquarters: Poso (until 1960)
- Active regions: Central Sulawesi; particularly in Poso, Morowali, and Banggai regencies
- Ideology: Pancasila; Indonesian nationalism Regionalism
- Status: Defunct by 1963
- Wars: Permesta rebellion South Sulawesi insurgency

The Central Sulawesi Youth Movement (Indonesian: Gerakan Pemuda Sulawesi Tengah) often abbreviated GPST, was a pro-government militia movement formed to counter the Permesta and Darul Islam rebellions in the eastern region of Central Sulawesi, particularly in Poso, Morowali, and Banggai, in the period 1957 to 1960. The GPST itself was established on 5 December 1957.

== Background ==
On 2 March 1957 in North Sulawesi, Permesta was proclaimed. The struggle was a rebellious movement that wanted greater autonomy and representations for the local regions in eastern Indonesia. The conflict escalated significantly due to the involvement of high-ranking officials from the Indonesian National Army (TNI) within the jurisdiction of Pangdam VII/Wirabuana. Among the notable figures during this period were Alex Kawilarang and Ventje Sumual, both associated with the TNI in Sulawesi before deserting for Permesta. Compounding the severity of the situation was the alleged support provided by the United States. The influential alliance possessed a fleet of 15 B-26 Invader bombers. The year 1957 witnessed TNI members across North and Central Sulawesi regions operating under the leadership of Permesta Commander, Alex Kawilarang. This collaboration resulted in a notable absence of TNI troops aligned with the Republic of Indonesia during that period, as loyalties appeared to shift within the military ranks.

On April 13, 1958, Permesta, under the command of TNI officials, executed aerial bombings on Makassar's Mandaidi Slash Field, causing extensive damage. Furthermore, the port of Donggala suffered significant destruction, resulting in the sinking of several ships anchored at Donggala Harbour. Permesta's control extended to the Morotai Airfield in Maluku, precipitating intense confrontations between TNI forces and Permesta splinter groups.

== Formation ==
The Christian population of the Lake Poso region was initially happy with the presence of Permesta's Christian troops who drove the Darul Islam army out of the Poso region. This did not last long, as the Permesta troops began to abuse the local population, which drove most of the Poso population to go into the jungles and highlands of Sulawesi.

Recognizing the imminent threat posed, on December 5, 1957, the youth bands of Central Sulawesi's highlands took decisive action by establishing an organization known as the Central Sulawesi Youth Movement. Initially an informal militia, the GPST grew into an organization formed by the Poso middle class. The chairman of the GPST, Asa Bungkundapu, is an employee of the tax office in Poso Regency and there are soldiers such as Masialo Tonigi, as well as Pastor Mogente Awusi. Likewise, many GPST members come from teachers such as Nico Pelima and Albert Bajaji. Under the leadership of Asa Bungkudapu in Poso City, the youth organized themselves to counteract the challenges presented by Permesta. Recruitment of GPST members was carried out in several areas such as Tentena, Kelei, Taripa, and others.

The story of the formation of GPST in Luwuk Banggai is different. The leader of the GPST for the Luwuk Banggai region is Eddy Martono. It started with the Batui sub-district head or Batui district head named Badru Salam who refused and disobeyed Permesta when Permesta broke off ties with Jakarta. Badru Salam is the one who built the relationship with GPST from Poso. GPST Luwuk started to carry out the movement when Robert M. Tengkow organized and held meetings with young people to prevent the confiscation or theft of weapons at the Permesta Dormitory. The movement then spread across educated Poso communities and reached all levels of society, including the upper, middle, and lower classes. It extended across Poso, Tentena, Mori, Tojo, Ampana, Luwuk, Kolonodale, and Bungku.

=== Fleeing into the jungle ===
Permesta's strength in Poso Regency is evident on the GPST map, indicating its potential to target the area. The power formation of Permesta is marked by 11 strategic points: Kolonodale, Pendolo, Bada, Besoa, Tentena, Pamona, Pebato, Poso, Uekuli, and Ampana. Notably, Permesta strategically positioned leaders in key locations. Major Jan Willem Gerungan led Permesta in the Central Sulawesi Region, including Poso Regency, with over 800 members. In Poso, Major Lukas J. Palar commanded 900 soldiers. By 1959, Major Gerungan had signed an official agreement for military cooperation with DI/TII and was appointed deputy commander of the joint staff for military defense cooperation.

Asa Bangkundapu, an employee of the tax office in Poso Regency, sent letters to his friends, who sought to create discussions and strategic planning to actualize his aspirations of freeing Poso from Permesta. Contact after contact with friends, they agreed to flee inland into the jungles of central Sulawesi, intending to draw governmental attention and subsequently articulate their demands. The youth movement that migrated to the jungle soon became a subject of suspicion by Permesta. After discussion, they then concluded that the next step was to inform the government that the local sons (native population) had agreed to organise a "flash broadcast" so that the public would know what the movement was really about.

As a result of the GPST's flash broadcasts, the Permesta took action starting with the arrests of GPST members who at that time did not have adequate legal protection. Permesta saw that the people of Poso and Tentena did not support Permesta. Thus, the Permesta considered that the GPST was committing insubordination and resistance and regarded Permesta as an enemy. 7 December 1957 was the beginning of the dissemination of the GPST flash broadcast and since then the Permesta began arresting suspected figures including Tentena community leaders. In their attacks on GPST, Permesta said that those who did not come out of the forest were intimidated through their families. If they did not come out, their parents would be killed.

Elsewhere, the GPST sent Asa Bungkundapu, Herman Parimo and Mogadi to Jakarta for a direct meeting with President Sukarno. In the context of Jakarta, PRRI/Permesta were perceived as rebels and permesta, being deemed an adversary of the State, was targeted for suppression. Subsequently, the GPST delegation received a favorable reception from individuals at the Army Headquarters. The government acknowledged their commitment to defending the State, marking the initiation of recognition for the GPST by the central authorities. Efforts to secure a meeting with General Nasution proved unsuccessful, as they were only permitted to meet his deputy due to Nasution's preoccupation. Mogadi remained in Makassar and proceeded directly to Poso. Providing an explanation of their mission, they obtained a recommendation to meet Colonel Maraden Panggabean, who held authority over Palopo. Following their return, they were directed to organize a brief military training program for GPST members. This training took place among troops brought by Maraden Panggabean, supervised by Lieutenant Colonel Soetadji in Koroncia. Venturing to the small village of Korontjia (pronounced Koroncia) in Palopo Regency, South Sulawesi, they strategized and devised a plan of resistance against the impending Permesta.

On April 30, 1958, in the village of Korontjia, the youth of Central Sulawesi made a historic declaration of loyalty to the Republic of Indonesia and a resolute determination to confront Permesta. This proclamation, known as the "Naskah Korontjia," was formally endorsed by Asa Bungkudapu, acting on behalf of GPST as its General Chairman. The document also bore the signature of Alex Soetadji, the deputy KDO of RTP-16 Brawidjaja. Then it was read out in Korontjia Field, Kalaena District, Malili Kewedanaan, Palopo Regency, South Sulawesi.

With the signing of the Korontjia Manuscript, the youth of Central Sulawesi affiliated with GPST unified their resolve to combat the splinter factions aligned with Permesta. During this period, GPST operated as an armed civilian force, receiving support from military authorities in Jakarta. Reinforcements from the Indonesian National Army (TNI) in Java of Yon 501 Brawijaya Troops. and Kamantan's Yon 601 Tanjungpura Troops were swiftly deployed to Central Sulawesi in collaboration with GPST to counter the emerging threat.

== Events ==
=== Expelling Permesta ===
Map of Central Sulawesi Youth Movement operations against Permesta in 1958

The successful campaign to expel Permesta from Central Sulawesi, spanning from December 5, 1957, to July 14, 1958, marked a pivotal chapter in the region's history. This military operation, orchestrated in collaboration with the Indonesian National Army (TNI), resulted in the re-establishment of control over Poso and the eradication of Permesta from Poso and Central Sulawesi.

In recognition of the notable contributions of the Gerakan Pemuda Sulawesi Tengah (GPST) in supporting the TNI during this operation, the Central Government (TNI) conferred prestigious awards, including the esteemed position of a member of the Temporary People's Consultative Assembly (MPRS).

As an expression of gratitude for the pivotal role played by the GPST leadership, a "Development and Thank You Fund" was extended, amounting to significant financial assistance, measured in hundreds of millions of rupiah during that period. This funding was allocated for diverse purposes, encompassing the development of Poso, provision of capital for ex-partisans seeking to embark on new livelihoods, facilitation of business endeavors, establishment of educational facilities, and provision of scholarships for ex-partisans pursuing academic endeavors.

Moreover, avenues were created for GPST ex-partisans meeting specific criteria to join the TNI, thereby reinforcing their integration into mainstream society. Those who did not meet the requirements for TNI membership were furnished with essential working capital and encouraged to return to their respective villages. This initiative aimed at fostering self-reliance and enabling the ex-partisans to rebuild their lives, support their families, and contribute to the development of their villages. Notably, discussions emerged regarding the prospect of forming the Central Sulawesi Province, an envisioned administrative division separate from the North-Central Sulawesi Province, with Manado as its proposed capital. This discourse reflected the broader implications of the historical events in Central Sulawesi during that period and underscored the potential reshaping of regional governance structures.

=== Internal conflict ===
In the concluding months of 1960, the GPST found itself embroiled in internal discord characterized by disputes among its elites. Central to these contentions were issues, including a perceived lack of transparency in the allocation and distribution of funds emanating from the central authority in Jakarta. Grievances surfaced among certain GKST (Central Sulawesi Christian Church) elites who, at the forefront of the struggle, felt deprived of their equitable financial allotments, thus engendering sentiments of injustice. Simultaneously, a cold war atmosphere pervaded the ranks of the GPST elite as they grappled with leadership struggles within the organization. The ensuing power struggles, coupled with the aforementioned financial disparities, contributed to a palpable erosion of trust in the central leadership of the GPST. This crisis of confidence, precipitated by the confluence of financial inequities and leadership disputes, manifested as a formidable challenge to the cohesion of the organization. Furthermore, the divergent attitudes among GPST elites in responding to and implementing the tenets of the Korontjia Manuscript, added an additional layer of complexity to the internal strife. The cumulative effect of these factors gave rise to a fractious environment within the GPST, marked by a pronounced schism among its leadership and a diminishing sense of unity.

=== Tentena Incident ===
After Permesta troops had been troops driven out in the 1960s, GPST-TNI Relations soured as the GPST did not agree with the military policy of Kodam XIII/Merdeka in Manado. The GPST immediately requests that policy changes should be implemented. Listing of;

- The establishment of Central Sulawesi Province with personnel consisting of local officials;
- Copra proceeds to be earmarked for development
- Establishment of an Army Regiment with a core of local sons (native population)

The TNI refused to do so. Against this backdrop, GPST forces, under the command of led by a member of the Poso DPRD, Herman Parimo, emerged as a pivotal element in the unfolding narrative. Having recently returned from engagements against DI/TII (Darul Islam) forces led by Colonel Amin Larekeng and Major M. Nur Rasyid in the Bada to Rampi region, situated along the Central Sulawesi-South Sulawesi border, Parimo's leadership assumed heightened significance. Notably, in a display of defiance, GPST troops, under Parimo's command, rejected orders issued by the GPST General Chairman. Additionally, they resisted disarmament attempts by TNI soldiers from Yon 501 Brawijaya in Tentena, underscoring the intensification of internal tensions within the GPST during this critical juncture. This the culminated to a battle between GPST partisans and TNI soldiers.

Following the confrontation, Tentena fell under the control of ex-GPST partisans, while the TNI strategically retreated to Poso City. This then resulted in the tragic loss of 12 TNI Kodam V/Brawijaya soldiers, prompting a reevaluation of the GPST's role by high-ranking TNI officials in Jakarta and Central Sulawesi. The Tentena incident marked a perceived shift, with some officials interpreting the GPST's actions as the emergence of a new "rebel embryo." In response to the attack, approximately 160 individuals suspected of being leaders or members of GPST partisans were apprehended by Brawijaya troops (Yon 501) in Poso City. These arrests were made on charges related to organizing the Tentena attack or allowing it to occur. The detainees were held in custody at various locations, including detention cells and military installations within the current Kodim office (army headquarters).

In early December 1960, a distressing incident occurred when a young man, a former GPST partisan, was fatally shot by Brawijaya army personnel in the vicinity of the National Building office. Despite having surrendered and embraced the flagpole of the Indonesian flag, the individual met an untimely demise. Simultaneously, rumors circulated about potential retaliation from GPST troops based in Tentena and the surrounding areas of Poso, heightening concerns and rumors of an impending invasion and reprisal in Poso City.

On 10 December 1960, TNI soldiers constructed defensive fortification in anticipation GPST's invasion attempt to release prisoners held in Poso District Command. The peak of the conflict transpired when the 501st Brawijaya troops were replaced by the 506th Brawijaya Battalion and the 601st Battalion from Tanjung Pura. Notable locations where bunkers were erected included the Poso Tentena intersection, the junction of the Poso Office and the Army Hospital, the Poso General Hospital intersection, and the junction of Poso Christian High School. These defensive structures were constructed using sandbags layered to form bunkers, equipped with 12.7mm heavy machine guns and Bren guns.

During this transition, the 501st Brawijaya troops, originally scheduled to return to Java by ship, carried out the execution of 11 individuals deemed leaders or members of the GPST Partisans. The executions took place at various locations, with some individuals having perished earlier in Poso, while others were executed at Kilometer 22 between Pandiri and Tampemadoro villages. Subsequently, the remaining prisoners, albeit some having escaped both before and after the executions, were predominantly released under the authority of the new military leadership from Battalion 506. The invasion never materialized and the GPST was said to be defunct or silently disbanded by 1963, as mentions of the GPST disappeared or left forgotten by history.

== Other events ==
=== Poso riots ===
In the early days of the Poso Riots, traces of the GPST re-emerged. On the evening of 27 December 1998, former GPST member Herman Parimo and his followers headed to Poso city in a truck with his followers - mostly Protestants - carrying the GPST banner and singing hymns as they circled the city. Dave McRae states in his book that, "the symbol reminds them that their parents proved capable [of retaliation, so what about us]", referring to an interviewee's response to the GPST's resistance to the rebellion.
