= Revolutionary Air Force of Indonesia =

Air force of the State of Katanga

- Angkatan Udara Revolusioner
- Active: 1958
- Country: Permesta
- Type: Air force
- Role: Aerial warfare
- Garrison/HQ: Mapanget Airfield
- Engagements: Permesta rebellion

Commanders
- Commander: Muda Petit Muharto

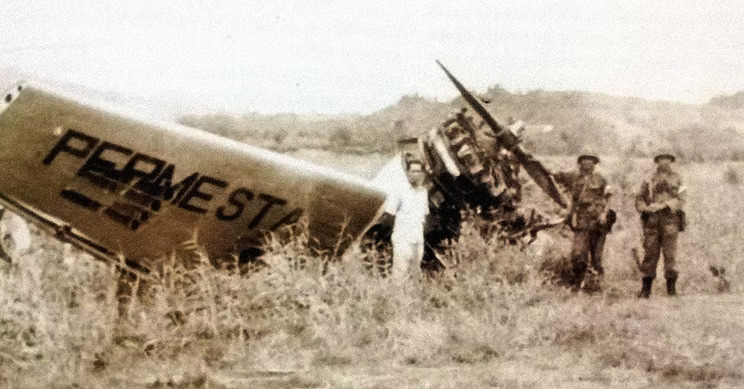
Indonesian soldiers standing next to destroyed AUREV plane

The Revolutionary Air Force (Indonesian: Angkatan Udara Revolusioner; AUREV), was the air force of the short lived secessionist movement of Permesta in North Sulawesi.

== List of aircraft ==
- B-26 invaders:
  - B-26B 44-34268, delivered on 12 April 1958, fate unknown
  - B-26B 44-34376, delivered on 12 April 1958, survived and used for Project Farm Gate in 1963
  - B-26B 44-34690, delivered on 12 April 1958, fate unknown
  - B-26B 44-35221, delivered on 17 May 1958, probably aircraft in which Allen Pope was shot down
  - B-26B 44-35441, delivered on 17 May 1958, probably aircraft damaged and abandoned at Mapengat
  - B-26B ? delivered on 18 May 1958, fate unknown
  - B-26C 44-34643, delivered on 26 May 1958, as spare parts source, probably abandoned in Indonesia
  - B-26C 44-35968, delivered on 26 May 1958, as spare parts source, probably abandoned in Indonesia
- F-51D Mustangs:
  - 44-73514, ‘3514’ or ‘I’?
  - 44-74030, ‘II’
  - 44-73562, ‘III’
  - 44-72917
  - 45-11369
  - 4511590
- C-45 Expeditors:
  - Two planes purchased from Taiwan, destroyed on the ground on 15 May 1958
- PBY Catalinas:
  - PBY-5A 08032 (MSN 851), destroyed at Mapanget Airfield, Manada on 13 May 1958 by Indonesian forces.
  - PBY-5A 08114 (MSN 933), returned from Menado, Sulawesi to the Philippines on June 21, 1958.
- C-47 Dakota:
  - Douglas C-47B-35-DK (DC-3) "T-450", destroyed on the ground on 18 May 1958

== Notable pilots ==
- Allen Lawrence Pope
- William H. Beale
