= Joop Warouw =

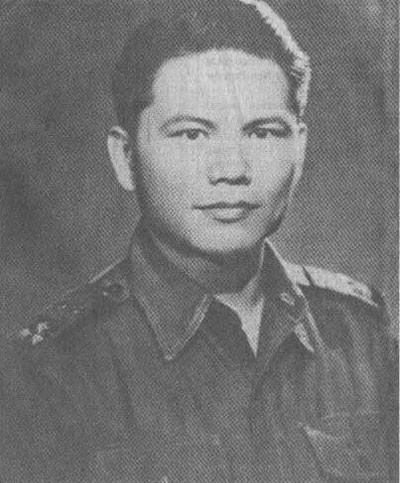
- Born: September 8, 1917; Batavia, Dutch East Indies
- Died: October 15, 1960 (aged 43); Minahasa, North Sulawesi, Indonesia
- Military career
- Branch: Indonesian Army
- Rank: Colonel
- Conflicts: Indonesian National Revolution; Battle of Surabaya; Permesta rebellion (executed)

Jacob Frederick Warouw (8 September 1917 – 15 October 1960), also known as Joop Warouw, was an Indonesian military officer and rebel leader, who served as one the vanguard leaders of the Permesta rebellion in Indonesia that sought greater regional autonomy from the central government in Java. He was killed by a fractious Permesta faction during the rebellion's twilight.

== Struggle for Indonesian Independence ==
Before World War II, Warouw was part of the Dutch colonial army (KNIL). After the war and upon the proclamation of Indonesian independence, Warouw was involved in organizing and became deputy leader of the "Republic of Indonesia Youth of Sulawesi" militia (Indonesian: Pemuda Republik Indonesia Sulawesi (PERISAI)) in Surabaya. This group was also known as the "Loyalty of the Indonesian People from Sulawesi" (Indonesian: Kebaktian Rakjat Indonesia Sulawesi (KRIS)) in Surabaya. This group was mostly made up of men from the Minahasa region in North Sulawesi who were residing in Java. Warouw took part in the Battle of Surabaya and emerged as a young military figure who showed valor during the battle. Starting from 1946, Warouw was assigned several military positions including Chief of Staff of the 6th Division of the Sea Army of the Republic of Indonesia (Indonesian: Tentara Laut Republik Indonesia (TLRI)) in Lawang and Chief of Staff of Base X of the TLRI in Situbondo. In 1948, he was appointed Deputy Commander of the 16th Brigade (Brigade XVI) and would subsequently succeed Adolf Lembong as commander of the brigade.

== VII/East Indonesia Military Territory (TT-VII/Indonesia Timur) ==
In April 1950, Warouw was assigned as Troop Commander "B" (Indonesian: Komando Pasukan (Kompas) "B"), which in 1952 became Infantry Regiment 24 (Indonesian: Resimen Infanteri 24 (RI-24)). He was based in Manado and was responsible for the region of north and central Sulawesi. In November 1950, he became Commander of Infantry Regiment 23 based in Parepare. In March 1952, he rose to the position of Chief of Staff of TT-VII/Indonesia Timur. After the 17 October affair in Jakarta where a group from the military called for the dissolution of the legislature, Warouw arrested his superior, Gatot Soebroto, because of the latter's support for the demonstrations in Jakarta. After serving as interim commander, on August 1, 1954, Warouw was officially installed as Commander of TT-VII/Indonesia Timur.

== Permesta ==
In 1956, Warouw was appointed military attaché in Beijing. His command of TT-VII/Indonesia Timur was transferred to Lieutenant Colonel Ventje Sumual. Because of continued grievances toward the central government in Java due to, among other things, the lack of regional autonomy, on March 2, 1957, Sumual declared the Universal Struggle Charter (Indonesian: Piagam Perjuangan Semesta (Permesta)). In February 1958, Warouw and Sumual went to Tokyo to meet President Sukarno to force him to take action on the current crisis in Indonesia. Soon after this meeting, Warouw would resign as Military Attaché and join the Permesta movement. He was considered one of the leaders of the movement along with Sumual and Alex Kawilarang. Permesta allied itself with a separate movement based in Sumatra called the "Revolutionary Government of the Republic of Indonesia" (Indonesian: Pemerintah Revolusioner Republik Indonesia (PRRI)). Warouw was appointed simultaneously as Vice Prime Minister and Development Minister of PRRI. The Indonesian government sent troops in an attempt to quell the rebellion. By 1960, the Indonesian army was gaining the upper hand in North Sulawesi. In April 1960, Warouw was captured and imprisoned by a fractious unit of the movement headed by Jan Timbuleng. He was killed on October 15, 1960, after being held for six months. His remains were only discovered in 1992 near Tombatu, which were moved and interred in his hometown of Remboken.
