= Justice Defense Force =

Anti-government militia in Indonesia

- Pasukan Pembela Keadilan
- Leaders: Sam Mangindaan (1950-1951) † "No Korompis" (1950-1955) (POW); Jan Timbuleng (1953-1960) (executed)
- Founded: 1950
- Dates active: 1950–1960
- Merged into: Permesta (1958)
- Active regions: North Sulawesi

Justice Defense Force – was an insurgent group active in Indonesia from 1950 to 1960.

== History ==
The PPK rebellion started in 1950 by former Indonesian soldiers No Korompis and Sam Mangindaan after being disappointed with their ranks. After Mangidaan was killed in 1951 No Korompis became the group's leader.

From April 13 to May 10 1953 state police, and military units captured 51 gang members along with their weapons. 29 gang members reportedly surrendered on 26 June. On 15 December 1953 PPK commander "No Korompis" surrendeed with five followers in Tontalete, however in January 1954 he reportedly fled to the mountains again. On 22 January 1955 Indonesian armed forces launched an operation against PPK in the Langoan area injuring and capturing the group commander, Nodi Wungkana. In early July 1955 No Korompis surrendered again in Kinilow. On 31 August 1955 PPK ambush in the village of Maumbi led to injury of Indonesian Lieutenant Colonel Worang.

In December 1956 PPK rebels forced the withdrawal of armed forces from Motoling in Minhasa. On 8 March 1957 Jan Tumbuleng and 3,000 PPK fighters reported in to the North Sulawesi government, however on 25 September together with 300 of his men he deserted and fled to the mountains.

=== Part of Permesta ===
At the end of March 1958 PPK joined Permesta, where they became integrated as the Battalion 999. Permesta general Warouw, who usually mediated between Kawilarang and Sumual, was captured by troops led by Jan Timbuleng in April 1960. After it was discovered that Warouw was held hostage by Timbuleng, Timbuleng himself was detained and executed by Sumual. To anticipate this, Timbuleng ordered his men to execute Warouw if he was caught. The execution took place sometime in October 1960.
