= Alexander Evert Kawilarang =

Indonesian military officer and rebel figure (1920–2000)

Alex Evert Kawilarang
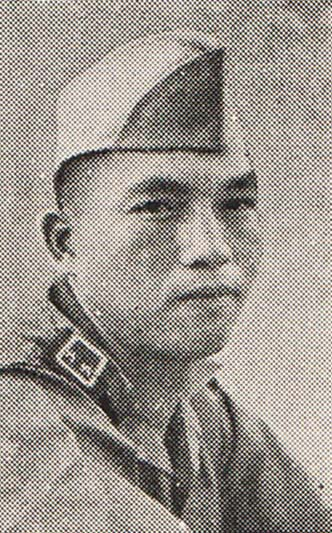
- Alex Kawilarang, c. 1950
- Born: 23 February 1920; Batavia, Dutch East Indies
- Died: 6 June 2000 (aged 80); Jakarta, Indonesia
- Military career
- Allegiance: Indonesia; Permesta
- Branch: Indonesian Army
- Service years: 1945–1961
- Rank: Colonel (TNI); Commander (Permesta)
- Units: KNIL (1941–1942); T & T III Siliwangi (1946–1948 & 1951–1956); T & T I Bukit Barisan (1948–1950); T & T VII Wirabuana (1950–1951); Permesta (1958–1961)
- Commands: T & T I Bukit Barisan (TNI); T & T III Siliwangi (TNI); T & T VII Wirabuana (TNI); Permesta
- Conflicts: Indonesian National Revolution; Invasion of Ambon; Permesta rebellion

Alexander Evert Kawilarang (23 February 1920 – 6 June 2000) was an Indonesian military officer and rebel leader. He was the founder of Kesko TT, the precursor of the Indonesian Army special forces unit Kopassus. In 1958, he resigned his post as military attaché to the United States to defect to the rebel Permesta movement after the Incidents in Manado, where he encountered his own unit as his opponent. His involvement in Permesta damaged his military career, but he remained a popular figure as well as was active in the armed forces community.

== Early life ==
Kawilarang was born in Batavia (now known as Jakarta) on 23 February 1920. His father, Alexander Herman Hermanus Kawilarang, was a major in the Royal Netherlands East Indies Army (KNIL or Koninklijk Nederlands Indisch Leger). His mother was Nelly Betsy Mogot. Both parents were from the Minahasa region in North Sulawesi.

Kawilarang enjoyed European-style education that included attending the Dutch secondary school (HBS or Hogere burgerschool) in Bandung. Around 1940, he attended the Dutch military academy or Koninklijke Militaire Academie that was moved to Bandung, because of the German occupation of the Netherlands. His classmates included A. H. Nasution and T. B. Simatupang. After graduating from the academy, he was stationed in Magelang as a platoon commander and assigned back to Bandung as an instructor.

During the Japanese occupation, Manadonese (Minahasan), Ambonese, and Indo people were often arbitrarily arrested during raids due to their perceived closeness to the Dutch. Many were severely tortured by the Kempeitai. Kawilarang was tortured several times by the Japanese in 1943 and 1944. He survived but suffered lifelong disability in his right arm and numerous scars. Kawilarang recalls: "Someone in the warung [food stall] said: 'Japan will grant the Indonesian people its freedom.' I could not ascribe any sense at all to such small talk. Impossible! That was my opinion. But I remained silent. I didn't feel much for more torture ... A newspaper wrote: 'Japan is an old friend.' Lies! I thought. Kawilarang slowly developed an appreciation for the rhetoric of the charismatic Indonesian nationalist Sukarno and became strongly convinced that the time for an independent Indonesian state had arrived.

In 1944, Kawilarang's father was presumed killed while he was a POW on the Japanese cargo ship Junyo Maru (see his father's Japanese detention card on the Dutch National Archives website). The ship was carrying 3,000 Menadonese, Ambonese, Indo-European, Dutch, British, Australian, and American POWs, and over 3,500 Javanese Romusha when it was sunk by the British submarine HMS Tradewind. Kawilarang recalls being told about the tragedy: "I prayed in silence. I did not cry. The Japanese had given me enough practice in digesting pain and suffering in silence."

For the remainder of the war, Kawilarang worked in several private companies in Sumatra, the last of which was as chief of a rubber factory in Tanjung Karang (now Bandar Lampung) in South Sumatra.

== Indonesian National Revolution ==
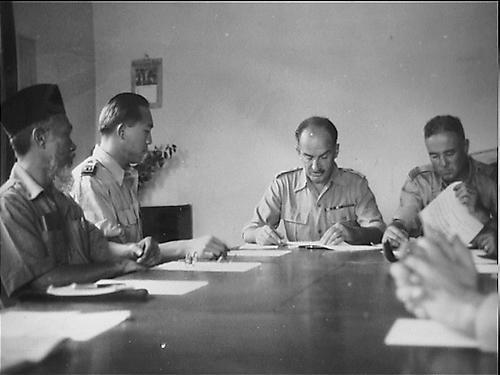
Kawilarang (second from left) accepting transfer of sovereignty in Tapanuli

After the Proclamation of Indonesian Independence, Kawilarang returned to Jakarta and enlisted in the newly formed Indonesian army. In October 1945, he was assigned to the staff of the First Command of West Java or Komandemen I Jawa Barat in Purwakarta and given the rank of major. In January 1946, he became Chief of Staff of the Bogor Infantry Regiment of the Second Division. In August 1946, he became the commander of the Second Brigade ("Surya Kencana") of the newly formed Siliwangi Division and was promoted to lieutenant colonel. He was in command of the brigade during Operation Product, a Dutch offensive against Indonesian forces. He also commanded the First Brigade for a brief period when the brigade was transferred to Yogyakarta.

In mid-1948, Kawilarang was included in a contingent of government and military officials to Bukittinggi in West Sumatra. The move was in anticipation of a second Dutch offensive and to allow the formation of an Indonesian emergency government outside of Java. Kawilarang was assigned to lead the Seventh Sub-Territorial Command (or Komando Sub-Teritorial VII) for Tapanuli and the southern region of East Sumatra. One of his tasks was to stop the infighting between factions of the army in the area. When the Indonesian government-in-exile was enacted after the second Dutch offensive began, Kawilarang was appointed as Deputy Military Governor of the region in Sumatra with Ferdinand Lumban Tobing appointed as Military Governor.

In December 1949, Kawilarang was appointed as Territorial Commander of North Sumatra (or Komando Teritorium/Sumatra Utara, now Kodam I/Bukit Barisan) in anticipation of the Dutch recognition of Indonesian sovereignty after the Dutch–Indonesian Round Table Conference. During his career, Kawilarang was territorial commander of two other important military districts: Military Territory VII / East Indonesia ( Tentara dan Teritorium (TT) VII/Indonesia Timur, now Kodam XIV/Hasanuddin) in April 1950 and Military Territory III / West Java (Tentara dan Teritorium (TT) III/Jawa Barat, now Kodam III/Siliwangi) in November 1951.

== Expeditionary force to East Indonesia ==
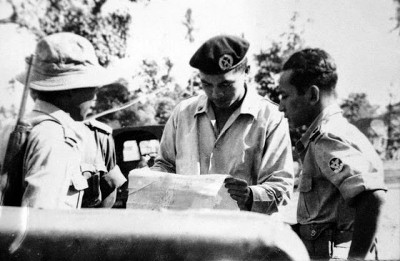
Kawilarang (middle) and Suharto (right)

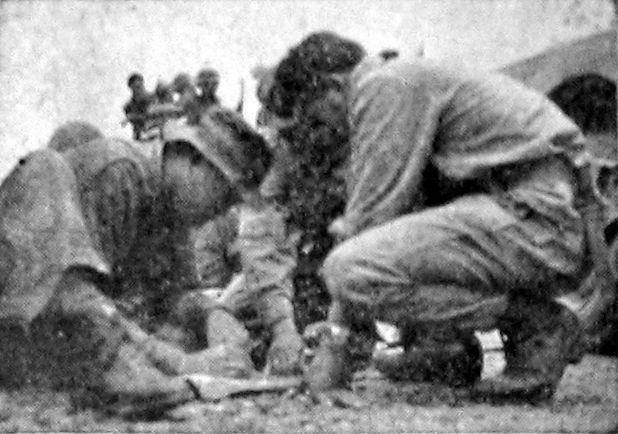
Kawilarang (left) and Slamet Rijadi discussing tactics in Ambon

Having just turned 30 and promoted to colonel, Kawilarang was given command of the first post-independence expeditionary force in April 1950. He was ordered to quell a revolt by a company of former KNIL that included Andi Aziz and Dutch army soldiers or Koninklijke Leger in Makassar, South Sulawesi. The expeditionary force consisted of several brigades, including those that were led by Suharto (the future second president of Indonesia) and Joop Warouw. On 8 August 1950, fighting ceased after negotiations between Kawilarang and Dutch General Scheffelaar. Regarding Kawilarang's relationship with Suharto during the expedition, Kawilarang was said to have struck Suharto due to a military blunder by troops under Suharto's command. In at least one interview, with Kawilarang, he denied striking Suharto, but did state that he had to admonish him.

Around the same time of the military operation in Makassar, Kawilarang also organized forces against the separatist RMS movement in the Moluccas. The fighting was more ferocious, because the opposition were well-trained Moluccan former KNIL soldiers including the Green Caps. Although better trained and renowned for their fighting skills, the resistance of the Moluccan soldiers was eventually put down in November 1950. Let. Col. Slamet Riyadi who was the commander of the government forces in the Maluku sector and an important participant during the offensive was killed on the final day of the campaign.

== Kopassus ==
The military engagements in Maluku prompted Kawilarang to establish what would later become Indonesia's special forces, Kopassus. Some acknowledge that the idea of a specialized commando unit was the brainchild of both Kawilarang and Riyadi. On 15 April 1952, Kawilarang founded the Third Territorial Army Commando Unit or Kesatuan Komando Tentara Territorium III (Kesko TT) when he was territorial commander of Military Territory III in Bandung. He asked Moch. Idjon Djanbi, a former KNIL commando, to train the unit. In 1999, a year before his death, Kawilarang became an honorary member of Kopassus and received a red beret during a ceremony commemorating the 47th anniversary of the establishment of Kopassus.

== Military attaché to the US ==
In August 1956, Maj. Gen. Nasution as Chief of Staff of the Army appointed Kawilarang to the post of Military Attaché to the United States. It has been argued that the purpose of the appointment was to remove Kawilarang from the influential post of commander of Military Territory III / West Java and replace him with an officer who was less of a threat or even pro-Nasution. A similar move by Nasution was to replace commander of the East Indonesia Military Territory from Joop Warouw to Ventje Sumual. Just a day before the transfer ceremony, Kawilarang ordered the arrest of the Foreign Minister Ruslan Abdulgani due to his alleged corrupt activities. This move was backed by Zulkifli Lubis, an opponent of Nasution. Nasution rescinded Kawilarang's order and Abdulgani was released. Regarding the appointment to Washington, Kawilarang himself stated that the position was offered by Nasution, because Kawilarang had wanted to obtain more military knowledge outside the country.

== Permesta ==
Because of continued grievances toward the central government in Java due to the lack of regional autonomy and economic development, on 2 March 1957, Ventje Sumual declared the Universal Struggle Charter or Piagam Perjuangan Semesta (Permesta). The movement was centered on Manado and Minahasa in North Sulawesi where Kawilarang was from. The movement allied itself with a separate movement based in Sumatra, the "Revolutionary Government of the Republic of Indonesia" or Pemerintah Revolusioner Republik Indonesia (PRRI). Kawilarang had been monitoring the situation from Washington and had concluded that the central government in Java and its mismanagement was to blame for the regional crisis. In March 1958, he informed the Indonesian ambassador to the US, Murkoto, that he would be leaving for North Sulawesi. He left his post on 22 March 1958.

Kawilarang was the only army officer who was not immediately dishonorably discharged for their participation in Permesta and PRRI. He had not fully accepted the PRRI side of the movement that he thought was aligned to religious extremists, and Jakarta had thus hoped that he would change his mind. Although he declined the position of Commander-in-chief of all PRRI-Permesta forces, he remained with Permesta and became Commander of the Permesta armed forces.

The rebellion lasted until 1961 when government forces managed to gain an upper hand on Permesta forces. The government forces were under the command of many officers who Kawilarang had previously fought on the same side with. The conflict was concluded peacefully through the efforts of F. J. Tumbelaka. Several ceremonies took place in April and May 1961 where the Indonesian government officially accepted back Permesta troops. Kawilarang participated in the ceremony on 14 April that was attended by the deputy commander of the Indonesian army, Maj. Gen. Hidayat, and also Brig. Gen. Achmad Yani both of whom Kawilarang knew well. Later in his life, he reflected on the virtues of comradery between men at arms and nobility among officers. During post war reunions with his former Dutch classmates at the Bandung school for officers he concludes: "Comradery is deeply rooted in their soul. I still wonder about the comradery between our own Indonesian cadets. In times of war combat is a duty. Comradery and humanity are a whole different chapter. I am convinced our state philosophy "Pancasila" breathes the same virtue.

== Civilian life ==
Permesta troops including Kawilarang were given amnesty by President Sukarno on 22 June 1961. However, due to his role in Permesta, he never received military distinctions like his contemporaries except for becoming an honorary member of Kopassus in 1999. Kawilarang resigned from his military position, but remained influential in the retired military society called purnawirawan and the Veterans Association or Pepabri. Putting his fighting years behind him, he made amends with all his former opponents and even visited The Netherlands several times for reunions with KNIL pensioners before his death in 2000.

Among the business activities that Kawilarang was involved in after returning to civilian life was as deputy manager of Jakarta Racing Management that maintained the racetrack at Pulo Mas in Jakarta and organized horse racing events. The annual national equestrian and horse racing competition is called the AE Kawilarang Memorial Cup.

== Death ==
On 6 June 2000, Kawilarang died at Cipto Mangunkusomo Hospital in Jakarta. He was laid in the Soedirman Room at the Siliwangi Military District Command Headquarters in Bandung that was followed by a full military ceremony led by Maj. Gen. Slamet Supriyadi, Siliwangi Military District Commander. Kawilarang was buried in the Cikutra Heroes Cemetery in Bandung.

== Personal life ==
Kawilarang was married twice. He married Petronella Isabella van Emden on 16 October 1952. They divorced in 1958. The couple had two children, Aisabella Nelly Kawilarang and Alexander Edwin Kawilarang. Kawilarang's second wife was Henny Olga Pondaag. They had one child, Pearl Hazel Kawilarang.

Kawilarang's son, Edwin, is head of the purnawirawan organization FKPPI and, as such, part of the so-called Keluarga Besar Purnawirawan (KBK), which translates to English as the 'Greater Family of Ex-military'. Under the New Order or Orde Baru, he was an official at Bimantara, a company owned by Suharto's son Bambang Trihatmodjo. Edwin was a member of the People's Consultative Assembly from 1997 to 2004, the Regional Representative Council from 2004 to 2009, and the People's Representative Council from 2009 to 2014. In each position, he represented constituents from the province of North Sulawesi.

Kawilarang's cousin, Daan Mogot, died during an attempt to disarm a Japanese army depot in Lengkong in 1946.

== Bibliography ==
- Abin, Dewi A. Rais (2016). Hidayat: Father, Friend, and a Gentleman. Jakarta: Yayasan Pustaka Obor Indonesia. ISBN 978-602-433-060-6.
- Anderson, Benedict R. O'G. (1972). Java in a Time of Revolution: Occupation and Resistance, 1944-1946. Ithaca: Cornell University Press. ISBN 0-8014-0687-0.
- Anwar, Rosihan (2004). Sejarah Kecil "Petite Histoire" Indonesia, Jilid 1 [Short History "Petite Histoire" of Indonesia, Volume 1] (in Indonesian). Jakarta: Penerbit Buku Kompas. ISBN 979-709-141-4.
- Asnan, Gusti; Henley, David; Pasande, Diks; Raben, Remco; Velthoen, Esther (2006). "Nation, Region and the Ambiguities of Modernity in Indonesia in the 1950s". In Nordholt, Henk Schulte; Hoogenboom, Ireen (eds.). Indonesian Transitions. Yogyakarta: Pustaka Pelajar. pp. 115–162. ISBN 979-245-844-1.
- Bramantoro, Tony (23 January 2017). "Ketat dan Semarak di Pacuan AE Kawilarang Memorial 2017, Hingga Hujanpun tak Dihiraukan" [Close and Vibrant at the racetrack for the 2017 AE Kawilarang Memorial Cup, Even the Rain was ignored]. Tribun News (in Indonesian).
- Conboy, Kenneth J. (2003). Kopassus: Inside Indonesia's Special Forces. Jakarta: Equinox Publishing. ISBN 9-7995-8988-6.
- van Dijk, Cornelius (1981). Rebellion Under the Banner of Islam: The Darul Islam in Indonesia. The Hague: Martinus Nijhoff. ISBN 978-902-476-172-2.
- Gayantari, Sri Indra; Alfian, Magdalia (2007). Sejarah Pemikiran Indonesia: 1945-1966 [The History of Thought Process of Indonesia: 1945-1966] (in Indonesian). Jakarta: Departemen Kebudayaan dan Pariwisata.
- Harvey, Barbara (2009). Permesta: Half a Rebellion. Equinox Publishing.
- Hill, David T. (2010). Journalism and Politics in Indonesia: A Critical Biography of Mochtar Lubis (1922-2004) as Editor and Author. London: RoutledgeCourzon. ISBN 978-041-566-684-8.
- "Indonesian Army Territorial Commanders 1950 -- March 1983". Indonesia. 35 (35): 109–124. April 1983. doi:10.2307/3350868. hdl:1813/53760. JSTOR 3350868.
- "Col. Kawilarang Buried in Bandung". Jakarta Post. Jakarta. 9 June 2000.
- Jenkins, David (1984). Suharto and His Generals: Indonesia's Military Politics, 1975-1983. Ithaca: Modern Indonesia Project, Cornell University. ISBN 978-087-763-030-2.
- Johnson, John J. (2015). Role of the Military in Underdeveloped Countries. Princeton: Princeton Legacy Library. ISBN 978-069-162-327-6.
- Kahin, Audrey; Kahin, George McTurnan (1995). Subversion as Foreign Policy: The Secret Eisenhower and Dulles Debacle in Indonesia. New York: The New Press. ISBN 1-5658-4244-8.
- Kartasasmita, Ginandjar (2013). Managing Indonesia's Transformation: An Oral History. Singapore: World Scientific Publishing Co. Pte. Ltd. ISBN 978-981-440-538-6.
- Kawilarang, A.E., Officier in dienst van de Republiek Indonesië., [Original publication: Ramadhan K.H., A.E. Kawilarang untuk Sang Merah Putih: Pengalaman 1942–1961 (Publisher: Pustaka Sinar Harapan, Jakarta, 1988)], (Publisher: Warung Bambu, Breda, 1994) P.28 ISBN 9-0801-1924-5
- Kingsbury, Damien (2003). Power Politics and the Indonesian Military. London: RoutledgeCourzon. ISBN 978-041-529-729-5.
- "AE Kawilarang Dimakamkan di Bandung" [AE Kawilarang Buried in Bandung]. Kompas. Jakarta. 8 June 2000.
- van der Kroef, Justus M. (April 1957). "Instability in Indonesia". Far Eastern Survey. 26 (4): 49–62. doi:10.2307/3024060. JSTOR 3024060.
- van der Kroef, Justus M. (May 1958). "Disunited Indonesia (II)". Far Eastern Survey. 27 (5): 73–80. doi:10.2307/3024286. JSTOR 3024286.
- Lev, Daniel S. (1966). The Transition to Guided Democracy: Indonesian Politics, 1957-1959. Ithaca: Modern Indonesia Project, Cornell University.
- Matanasi, Petrik (2011). Pribumi Jadi Letnan KNIL [A Native Becomes a KNIL Lieutenant] (in Indonesian). Yogyakarta: Trompet.
- Daftar Peraturan Presiden, Keputusan Presiden, dan Instrucksi Presiden [List of Presidential Rules, Decisions, and Orders] (PDF) (Report). Indonesian Ministry of Home Affairs. 2011.
- Morrison, James (1999). Feet to the Fire: CIA Covert Operations in Indonesia, 1957-1958. Naval Institute Press.
- Palohoon, Jerry (12 May 2017). "12 Mei 1961: Puncak Prosesi Perdamaian "Pusat" dan Permesta" [12 May 1961: The Peak of the Peace Procession between the Central Government and Permesta]. Berita Manado (in Indonesian).
- Ramadhan Karta Hadimadja (1988). A.E. Kawilarang: Untuk Sang Merah Putih [A.E. Kawilarang: For the Red-and-White] (in Indonesian). Jakarta: Pustaka Sinar Harapan.
- Ramadhan Karta Hadimadja (1992). Memoar Ali Sadikin: Gubernur Jakarta Raya, 1966-1977 [Memoir of Ali Sadikin: Former Governor of the Special District of Jakarta, 1966-1977] (in Indonesian). Jakarta: Pustaka Sinar Harapan.
- Royal Institute of International Affairs (2–16 August 1950). "Chronology, 2 August 1950 - 16 August 1950". Chronology of International Events and Documents. 6 (16): 521–554.
- Sebastian, Leonard (2006). Realpolitik Ideology: Indonesia's Use of Military Force. Singapore: ISEAS. ISBN 978-981-230-311-0.
- Simatupang, Tahi Bonar (1972). Report from Banaran: Experiences During the People's War. Translated by Anderson, Benedict; Graves, Elizabeth. Ithaca: Modern Indonesia Project, Cornell University.
- Suprayitno (2011). "Jalan Keluar yang Buntu: Federasi Sumatera Sebagai Gagasan Kaum Terpojok". In van Bemmelen, Sita; Rabe, Remco (eds.). Antara Daerah dan Negara: Indonesia Tahun 1950-an [Between the Region and the Nation: Indonesia in the 1950s]. Jakarta: Yayasan Pustaka Obor Indonesia. pp. 64–105. ISBN 978-979-461-772-4.
- "From Brown to Red". TEMPO. Jakarta: Arsa Raya Perdana. 16 April 2002.
- Vey, Ruth (April 1971). "The Post-Revolutionary Transformation of the Indonesian Army". Indonesia. 11 (11): 131–176. doi:10.2307/3350748. hdl:1813/53507. JSTOR 3350748.
- Wajah DPR dan DPD, 2009-2014: Latar Belakang Pendidikan dan Karier [Directory of members of the Indonesian House of Representatives (DPR) and Regional Representatives Council (DPD), elected for the period of 2009-2014] (in Indonesian). Jakarta: Penerbit Buku Kompas. 2010.
