= Permesta =

Rebel movement in Indonesia active from 1957 to 1961

- Piagam Perjuangan Semesta
- Leaders: Semuel Dolf Runturambi; Alexander Evert Kawilarang; Ventje Sumual; Joop Warouw
- Dates active: 1957–1961
- Allegiance: PRRI
- Headquarters: Makassar (until 20 June 1957); Manado (20 June 1957 – 24 June 1958); Tomohon (24 June – 16 August 1958); Kotamobagu (16 August 1958 – 14 September 1959)
- Active regions: Eastern Indonesia

Permesta was a rebel movement in Indonesia. It was founded on 2 March 1957 by civil and military leaders in Eastern Indonesia. Initially the center of the movement was in Makassar, which at that time was the capital of the province of Sulawesi. However, support for the movement in South Sulawesi gradually dissipated, forcing the headquarters to move to Manado in North Sulawesi.

On 17 February 1958, Permesta joined forces with the Revolutionary Government of the Republic of Indonesia (PRRI or Pemerintah Revolusioner Republik Indonesia) based in Sumatra that declared a revolutionary government two days earlier. Following successful attacks by government forces (TNI) from the Indonesian central government on the PRRI in Sumatra, the conflict swung to the east where the Permesta rebels were based. Manado was captured at the end of June 1958. However, the Permesta rebels continued their resistance, fighting a guerrilla campaign against the TNI until the last remnants surrendered and were given amnesty in 1961. The conflict killed 4,000 government soldiers and 2,000 Permesta rebels.

The name "Permesta" is a syllabic abbreviation of the Indonesian Perjuangan Semesta meaning Universal Struggle Charter.

== Military structure ==
Armed forces:

- Battle Area Command (KDP) I / North Maluku: Major Jonkhy Robert Kumontoy
- Battle Area Command (KDP) II / Minahasa (KDPM): Daniel Julius Somba
  - Manado City Military Command (KMKB)
  - Tomohon Garrison Regional Command (KDG)
- Battle Area Command (KDP) III / Bolmong-Gorontalo: Dolf Runturambi
  - Kotamobagu City Military Command (KMK)
- Battle Area Command (KDP) IV / Central Sulawesi (Palu, Donggala, Toli-toli, Poso): Jan Wellem (Dee) Gerungan
- Autonomus units:
  - Brigade 999/CTN: Jan Timbuleng
  - Manguni Brigade: Lieutenant Colonel Laurens F. SAERANG
  - Sambernjawa Brigade : Major Daan KARAMOY
  - Anoa Brigade Djantan: Major J. LUMINGKEWAS
  - Sinobatu Brigade: Major W. SIREGAR
  - Student Army Corps (CTP): Captain Jimmy Noya

Air forces:
Revolutionary Air Force/ KSAU (AUREV): Commodore Muda Petit Muharto

== Air force ==
Greater CIA support was seen with the dispatch aircraft that made up the Permesta air force called the Revolutionary Air Force (AUREV or Angkatan Udara Revolusioner) based in Manado, an air force formed by Permesta in order to seize and control Indonesian airspace. The aircraft sent were 15 B-26 Invader bombers and some P-51 Mustang fighters. In addition to the aircraft, the CIA sent pilots, mechanics, aircraft weaponry, and spare parts.

Aircraft	Origin	Type	In service	Notes
Combat aircraft
B-26	United States	B	6	
B-26	United States	C	2	
F-51 Mustang	United States	D	6	

== Generals ==
- Alexander Evert Kawilarang – surrendered on 14 April 1961.
- Ventje Sumual – was a military officer involved in the Indonesian National Revolution he also involved in General Offensive of 1 March 1949. Surrender on 20 October 1961.
- Joop Warouw – was an Indonesian military officer and rebel leader, he was considered one of the leaders of the movement along with Sumual and Alex Kawilarang. In April 1960, Warouw was captured and imprisoned by a fractious unit of the movement headed by Jan Timbuleng. He was killed on October 15, 1960, after being held for six months. His remains were only discovered in 1992 near Tombatu, which were moved and interred in his hometown of Remboken.
- Jan Willem Gerungan – Permesta commander in Central Sulawesi, joined the Kahar Muzakkar's during the South Sulawesi insurgency. He was arrested on 19 July 1965, tried by a summary court and executed.
- Jan Timbuleng – former leader of the Justice Defense Force, at the end of March 1958 PPK joined Permesta, where be became commander of the Battalion 999. Permesta general Warouw, who usually mediated between Kawilarang and Sumual, was captured by troops led by Jan Timbuleng in April 1960. After it was discovered that Warouw was held hostage by Timbuleng, Timbuleng himself was detained and executed by Sumual.
- Lukas J. Palar – killed by Indonesian airstrike on 10 March 1958.
- Daniel Julius Somba
- Jonkhy Robert Kumontoy – leader of Permesta in North Moluccas, became the last Permesta commander to surrender in early 1962 after the news of the end of the war reached him in the jungle.

== State symbols ==
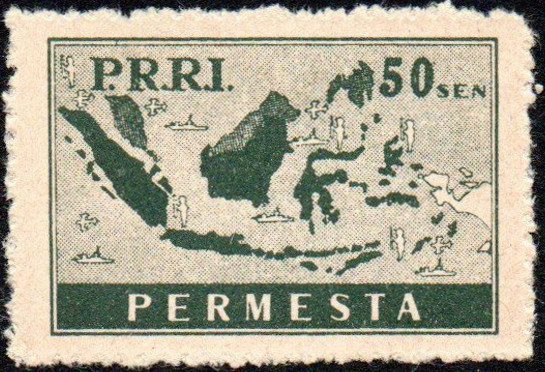
Stamp issued by Permesta

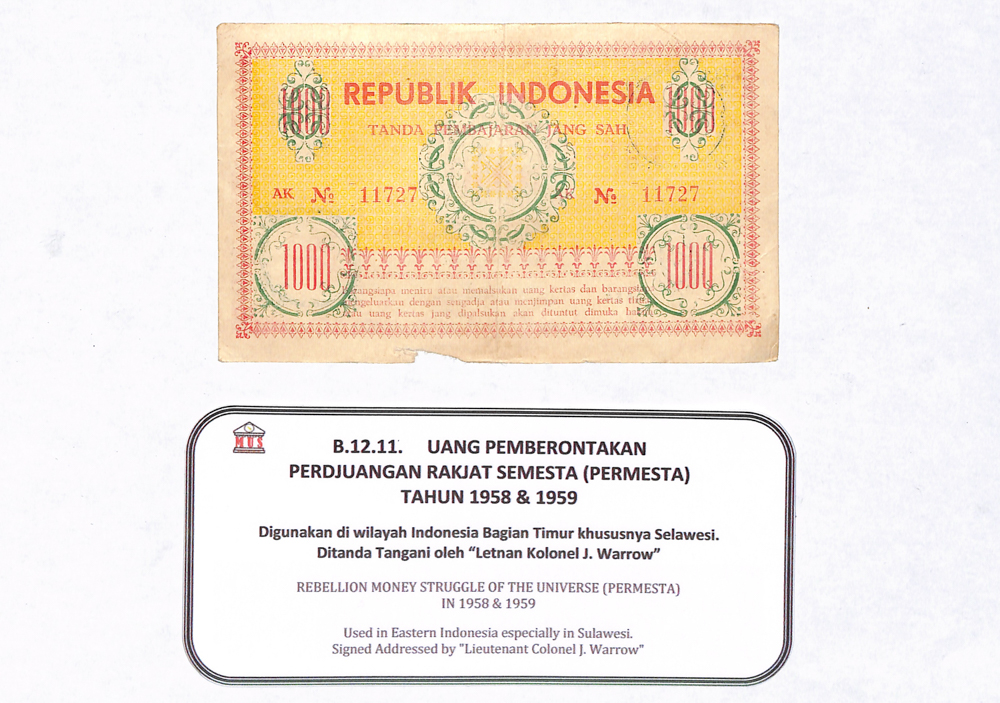
Bank notes issued by Permesta government

From March to August 1959 Permesta issued a number of stamps, measuring 42½ x 28½ mm they depicted a map of Indonesia. They were used in Kotamobagu and Inobonto posts. Permesta also printed two series of banknotes in 1958 and 1959.

== Bibliography ==
- Harvey, Barbara S. (1977). Permesta: Half a Rebellion. Ithaca: Cornell Modern Indonesia Project, Southeast Asia Program, Cornell University.
