= Ventje Sumual =

Proclamator and Leader of the Permesta (1923-2010)

- Born: 11 June 1923; Remboken, North Sulawesi, Dutch East Indies
- Died: 28 March 2010 (aged 86); Jakarta, Indonesia
- Military career
- Branch: Indonesian Army
- Rank: Lieutenant Colonel
- Conflicts: Indonesian National Revolution; General Offensive of 1 March 1949; Permesta rebellion; Operation Jakarta; Bombing of Manado

Herman Nicolas Ventje Sumual (11 June 1923 – 28 March 2010) was a military officer involved in the Indonesian National Revolution he also involved in General Offensive of 1 March 1949. His appointments include regional commander of KODAM VII/Wirabuana, but he is best known as the leader of the Permesta movement and their proclamators.
