= List of shipwrecks in 1958 =

The list of shipwrecks in 1958 includes ships sunk, foundered, grounded, or otherwise lost during 1958.

table of contents
1958
Jan	Feb	Mar	Apr
May	Jun	Jul	Aug
Sep	Oct	Nov	Dec
Unknown date

== January ==
=== 4 January ===
List of shipwrecks: 4 January 1958
Ship	State	Description
Gertie Ellen	United States	The 17-gross register ton, 37.4-foot (11.4 m) fishing vessel sank at Ketchikan, Territory of Alaska.

=== 6 January ===
List of shipwrecks: 6 January 1958
Ship	State	Description
Capella	Netherlands	The coaster foundered 10 nautical miles (19 km) north of Texel with the loss of all nine crew.

=== 9 January ===
List of shipwrecks: 9 January 1958
Ship	State	Description
Ballyherbert	Ireland	The coaster ran aground near Ardrossan, Ayrshire.
Stanrealm	United Kingdom	The cargo ship ran aground in Holy Loch. Later refloated and towed to Greenock, Renfrewshire.
HMS Taciturn	Royal Navy	The T-class submarine ran aground in the Firth of Clyde. Later refloated with the aid of the boom defence vessel HMS Barcombe (Royal Navy).

=== 13 January ===
List of shipwrecks: 13 January 1958
Ship	State	Description
HMS Barcombe	Royal Navy	The Bar-class boom defence vessel ran aground in Loch Buie, Argyllshire. The ship was holed, and the crew were taken off by HMS Kingfisher.

=== 15 January ===
List of shipwrecks: 15 January 1958
Ship	State	Description
Seirstad	Norway	The tanker broke in two 70 nautical miles (130 km) south east of Minorca, Spain. Her crew were rescued by Bintang (Netherlands) and Rubicone (Italy). Seirstad was on a voyage from the Persian Gulf to Barcelona, Spain.

=== 16 January ===
List of shipwrecks: 16 January 1958
Ship	State	Description
Glen Rosa	United Kingdom	The VIC-type lighter ran aground off the Isle of Mull and was abandoned by her crew. She was on a voyage from the Isle of Mull to Troon, Ayrshire. She sank and was a total loss.

=== 20 January ===
List of shipwrecks: 20 January 1958
Ship	State	Description
"Florence Brierly"	South Africa	The 138.9-foot (42.3 m) out of service trawler was sunk as a target by the South African Navy off Robben Island, South Africa.

=== 21 January ===
List of shipwrecks: 21 January 1958
Ship	State	Description
Anna Toop	United Kingdom	The coaster grounded on South Arklow Bank, County Wicklow, Ireland. All eleven crew rescued by the Arklow lifeboat. Refloated and taken in tow, but sank the next day.
Luffness	United Kingdom	The trawler grounded on the North Pier, Aberdeen Harbour, Scotland. 11 crew rescued by the Aberdeen pilot cutter, and one rescued by the tug Danny. Later repaired, refloated, and taken in tow, but sank a few miles out to sea.

=== 27 January ===
List of shipwrecks: 27 January 1958
Ship	State	Description
Nankai Maru	Japan	The ferry sank in the Kii Strait with the loss of all 170 on board.

=== 29 January ===
List of shipwrecks: 29 January 1958
Ship	State	Description
Hadsel	Norway	The coaster ran aground on the Lofoten Islands and sank. All 46 passengers and crew were rescued.
ROCS Yong Ning	Republic of China Navy	The Zhen Nan-class minesweeper was wrecked during a typhoon.

=== 31 January ===
List of shipwrecks: 31 January 1958
Ship	State	Description
Skee-Dunk	United States	The 44-gross register ton, 47-foot (14 m) motor cargo vessel was wrecked at Driftwood Bay (53°59′N 166°51′W) near Dutch Harbor, Territory of Alaska, on Unalaska Island in the Aleutian Islands.

== February ==
=== 4 February ===
List of shipwrecks: 4 February 1958
Ship	State	Description
St. Elefterio	Panama	The cargo ship sprang a leak. She was escorted by United States Navy destroyers with the intention of putting in to San Juan, Puerto Rico, but capsized and sank on 6 February (21°54′N 61°16′W) She was on a voyage from Nuevitas, Cuba to a British port.

=== 11 February ===
List of shipwrecks: 11 February 1958
Ship	State	Description
Aydin, and Charles Tellier	Turkey; France	The Victory ship Aydin collided with the cargo ship Charles Tellier in the Scheldt. Aydin was on a voyage from Antwerp, Belgium to Istanbul, Turkey. Both vessels were beached. Salvage of Aydin was abandoned in March and she was declared a total loss. Charles Tellier was later refloated and taken in to Antwerp.

=== 16 February ===
List of shipwrecks: 16 February 1958
Ship	State	Description
USS Guavina	United States Navy	While the Gato-class submarine was at anchor off San Salvador in the Bahamas, high winds and heavy seas pushed her aground. She remained hard aground for several days until the salvage and rescue ships USS Petrel and USS Escape and the fleet tugs USS Shakori and USS Allegheny (all United States Navy) freed her.

=== 19 February ===
List of shipwrecks: 19 February 1958
Ship	State	Description
Seistan	United Kingdom	The cargo ship caught fire, exploded and sank in the Persian Gulf. Fifty eight of her 66 crew were killed.

=== 25 February ===
List of shipwrecks: 25 February 1958
Ship	State	Description
Gannochy	United Kingdom	The coaster sank in the Mersey Channel, 13 nautical miles (24 km) north west of Liverpool, Lancashire.

=== 26 February ===
List of shipwrecks: 26 February 1958
Ship	State	Description
Hawkstone	United Kingdom	The tug ran aground in the Thames Estuary. Two barges she was towing were discovered at Allhallows, Kent and Yantlett, Kent. All six crew were killed.

== March ==
=== 1 March ===
List of shipwrecks: 1 March 1958
Ship	State	Description
Üsküdar	Turkey	The ferry sank in lodos with the loss of 272 people aboard including seven crew. 39 people survived.

=== 2 March ===
List of shipwrecks: 2 March 1958
Ship	State	Description
Continental	West Germany	The coaster was in collision with the collier Wansbeck (United Kingdom) off Cromer, Norfolk and sank with the loss of one of her six crew.
Odin	United States	The 19-gross register ton, 39.5-foot (12.0 m) fishing vessel was destroyed by fire at Petersburg, Territory of Alaska.

=== 9 March ===
List of shipwrecks: 9 March 1958
Ship	State	Description
Lusambo	Belgium	The cargo ship struck a submerged object naar the Westhinder Lightship and holed. Put into Antwerp for repairs.

=== 10 March ===
List of shipwrecks: 10 March 1958
Ship	State	Description
Rainer	West Germany	The coaster ran aground near the Lorelei Rock, in the Rhine and sank.

=== 14 March ===
List of shipwrecks: 14 March 1958
Ship	State	Description
Nadia	Panama	The cargo ship sank at the entrance to Alexandria Harbour, Egypt. All 35 crew were rescued.

=== 19 March ===
List of shipwrecks: 19 March 1958
Ship	State	Description
USS Ford County	United States Navy	The decommissioned LST-542-class tank landing ship was sunk as a target.
USS Kent County	United States Navy	The decommissioned LST-542-class tank landing ship was sunk as a target.

=== 27 March ===
List of shipwrecks: 27 March 1958
Ship	State	Description
Enrico Insom	Italy	The tanker ran aground at Port Said, Egypt, blocking the Suez Canal.

=== 28 March ===
List of shipwrecks: 28 March 1958
Ship	State	Description
USS Lyman County	United States Navy	The decommissioned LST-542-class tank landing ship was sunk as a torpedo target by the submarine USS Menhaden (United States Navy) off the coast of Baja California.

=== 31 March ===
List of shipwrecks: 31 March 1958
Ship	State	Description
Skaubryn	Norway	Caught fire in the Indian Ocean. One passenger died.

== April ==
=== 6 April ===
List of shipwrecks: 6 April 1958
Ship	State	Description
Pan Ocean	Panama	The cargo ship foundered in the Mediterranean Sea 160 nautical miles (300 km) north west of Alexandria, Egypt (33°15′N 27°55′E). She was on a voyage from Mormugao, India to Genoa, Italy.
Skaubryn	Norway	The passenger ship sank in the Indian Ocean.

=== 15 April ===
List of shipwrecks: 15 April 1958
Ship	State	Description
William C. Ralston	United States	The Liberty ship was scuttled off the coast of California with a cargo of obsolete ammunition.

=== 20 April ===
List of shipwrecks: 20 April 1958
Ship	State	Description
Pepinella	Italy	The cargo ship collided with Sunoak (Norway) and sank 30 nautical miles (56 km) east of Ramsgate, Kent with the loss of one of her nineteen crew.

=== 28 April ===
List of shipwrecks: 28 April 1958
Ship	State	Description
Aquila	Italy	The cargo ship was bombed off Amboina Island, Indonesia by a CIA Douglas B-26 Invader aircraft and was abandoned by her crew.
Gili Radja	Indonesia	The cargo ship was shelled or bombed and sunk by a CIA Douglas B-26 Invader aircraft at Donggala, Central Sulawesi, Indonesia.
KRI Hang Tuah	Indonesian Navy	The Radjawali-class corvette was bombed and sunk by a CIA Douglas B-26 Invader aircraft off Balikpapan, East Kalimantan, Indonesia. 18 crewmen were killed, 28 wounded.
Moro	Panama	The cargo ship was bombed and sunk by a CIA Douglas B-26 Invader aircraft at Donggala, Central Sulawesi, Indonesia.
Mutiara	Indonesia	The cargo ship was bombed and sunk by a CIA Douglas B-26 Invader aircraft at Donggala, Central Sulawesi, Indonesia.
Nuburi	Indonesia	The cargo ship was bombed and sunk by a CIA Douglas B-26 Invader aircraft at Donggala, Central Sulawesi, Indonesia.
San Flaviano	United Kingdom	The tanker was bombed and sunk by a CIA Douglas B-26 Invader aircraft off Balikpapan, East Kalimantan, Indonesia.

=== 28 or 30 April ===
These two ships were bombed in an air raid or raids on Ambon Bay in Indonesia. Ambon was bombed several times, and sources differ as to the date(s) on which the ships were attacked. One source suggests that they were hit on 1 or 2 May.

List of shipwrecks: 28 or 30 April 1958
Ship	State	Description
Armonia	Greece	The cargo ship was bombed and damaged or sunk by a CIA Douglas B-26 Invader aircraft. in Ambon Bay, Indonesia. Subsequently salvaged and registered in Panama as Keanyew.
Flying Lark	Panama	The cargo ship was bombed and sunk by a CIA Douglas B-26 Invader aircraft. in Ambon Bay, Indonesia. Nine crewmen were killed, seven missing.

=== 29 April ===
List of shipwrecks: 29 April 1958
Ship	State	Description
KRI Intata	Indonesian Navy	The auxiliary patrol ship was bombed and sunk at Kendari, Indonesia by a CIA Douglas B-26 Invader aircraft. Five crewmen killed, 23 wounded.

== May ==
=== 1 May ===
List of shipwrecks: 1 May 1958
Ship	State	Description
Aquila	Italy	The cargo ship was bombed by CIA Douglas B-26 Invader aircraft off Amboina Island, Indonesia. She sank on 27 May 1958.

=== 2 May ===
List of shipwrecks: 2 May 1958
Ship	State	Description
Nefeli	Greece	The cargo ship foundered in the Red Sea. All eighteen crew rescued by Frankfort (West Germany).

=== 8 May ===
List of shipwrecks: 8 May 1958
Ship	State	Description
Liberty	United States	A storm destroyed the 66-gross register ton, 72.4-foot (22.1 m) fishing vessel at Cape Ikolik (57°17′15″N 154°47′00″W) on the coast of Kodiak Island in the Territory of Alaska.

=== 12 May ===
List of shipwrecks: 12 May 1958
Ship	State	Description
Cliffville	United Kingdom	The coaster sprang a leak and capsized at Meadowside Granary Wharf, Glasgow, Renfrewshire. She was declared a constructive total loss and scrapped.

=== 13 May ===
List of shipwrecks: 13 May 1958
Ship	State	Description
Unidentified sailing vessel	Indonesia	The sailing vessel was strafed by a U.S. Central Intelligence Agency B-26 Invader bomber and a PBY Catalina flying boat and was beached.

=== 14 May ===
List of shipwrecks: 14 May 1958
Ship	State	Description
USS President Hayes	United States Navy	The Type C3 ship ran aground in the Paracel Islands in the South China Sea.

=== 17 May ===
List of shipwrecks: 17 May 1958
Ship	State	Description
Playfair	United States	The 7-gross register ton, 32-foot (9.8 m) fishing vessel was destroyed by fire in Cold Bay (55°32′25″N 132°23′50″W) off Kasaan, Territory of Alaska.

=== 22 May ===
List of shipwrecks: 22 May 1958
Ship	State	Description
USS Gibson County	United States Navy	The LST-542-class tank landing ship was sunk as a target by the submarine USS Rasher (United States Navy).

=== 29 May ===
List of shipwrecks: 29 May 1958
Ship	State	Description
USS Stickleback	United States Navy	The Balao-class submarine collided with the destroyer escort USS Silverstein (United States Navy) in the Pacific Ocean near Hawaii and sank. All 82 crew members were rescued.

=== 31 May ===
List of shipwrecks: 31 May 1958
Ship	State	Description
Mako	United States	The 9-gross register ton, 30-foot (9.1 m) fishing vessel was destroyed by fire in Cook Inlet on the south-central coast of the Territory of Alaska off the mouth of the Kasilof River on the Kenai Peninsula.

== June ==
=== 3 June ===
List of shipwrecks: 3 June 1958
Ship	State	Description
Gayunda	Australia	Gayunda The barge, a former gunboat, was beached at Woody Point, Queensland, Australia, to serve as a breakwater.
Taxiarchis	Greece	The cargo ship caught fire and was beached on Bahrain Island, Bahrain. She was on a voyage from London, United Kingdom to the Persian Gulf. She was refloated on 8 June. Subsequently repaired and returned to service.

=== 6 June ===
List of shipwrecks: 6 June 1958
Ship	State	Description
Arlyn	United States	The Liberty ship ran aground on the Silver Bank, off the coast of the Dominican Republic. She was on a voyage from San Juan, Puerto Rico to Philadelphia, Pennsylvania. She was refloated on 9 June and towed in to San Juan. She was declared a constructive total loss.

=== 8 June ===
List of shipwrecks: 8 June 1958
Ship	State	Description
Lady Stella	United Kingdom	The coaster was in collision with Pardo and sank 3 nautical miles (5.6 km) off Dover, Kent, England. All twelve on board rescued by the tug Dominance (United Kingdom).

=== 16 June ===
List of shipwrecks: 16 June 1958
Ship	State	Description
A P A-S-5	United States	The 96-gross register ton, 72-foot (21.9 m) scow sank in Bristol Bay off the coast of the Territory of Alaska.

=== 17 June ===
List of shipwrecks: 17 June 1958
Ship	State	Description
Arctic	United States	The 8-gross register ton, 30.8-foot (9.4 m) fishing vessel sank approximately 18 nautical miles (33 km; 21 mi) west of Port Moller (55°53′N 160°28′W), Territory of Alaska.

=== 20 June ===
List of shipwrecks: 20 June 1958
Ship	State	Description
Lavernock	United Kingdom	The tug was run down and sunk in the Bristol Channel. She was salvaged on 1 August and was consequently scrapped.

=== 21 June ===
List of shipwrecks: 21 June 1961
Ship	State	Description
Michael Moran	United States	The Liberty ship was scuttled at sea with a cargo of obsolete chemical ammunition.

=== 25 June ===
List of shipwrecks: 25 June 1958
Ship	State	Description
Empress Bay	United States	1958 East River collision: The tanker collided with the cargo ship Nebraska (Sweden) in the East River in New York City, causing a gasoline spill and subsequent fire and killing three people, one indirectly. She became partially submerged, then sank on 26 June. She was refloated on 9 September.
Nebraska	Sweden	1958 East River collision: The cargo ship collided with the tanker Empress Bay (United States) in the East River in New York City, causing a gasoline spill and subsequent fire and killing three people, one indirectly. She remained afloat and reached a pier under her own power.

=== 26 June ===
List of shipwrecks: 26 June 1958
Ship	State	Description
Mercury	United States	The 73-gross register ton, 72-foot (21.9 m) fishing vessel was destroyed by fire at Seldovia, Territory of Alaska.
Omega	Peru	The barque sprang a leak and sank off Peru.

== July ==
=== 1 July ===
List of shipwrecks: 1 July 1958
Ship	State	Description
Seldovia	United States	The 10-gross register ton, 32.7-foot (10.0 m) fishing vessel was destroyed by fire near Elizabeth Island (59°10′N 151°50′W) at the mouth of Cook Inlet on the south-central coast of the Territory of Alaska.

=== 6 July ===
List of shipwrecks: 6 July 1958
Ship	State	Description
Josef Joham	West Germany	The coastal tanker collided with Ludwigshafen (West Germany) in the English Channel north of Guernsey. Josef Joham was cut in two and sank, all eleven crew were rescued by Ludwigshafen.

=== 9 July ===
List of shipwrecks: 9 July 1958
Ship	State	Description
Badger	United States	1958 Lituya Bay earthquake and megatsunami: A megatsunami struck the 19-gross register ton, 40.2-foot (12.3 m) fishing vessel while she was at anchor in Lituya Bay in Southeast Alaska, carrying her over La Chaussee Spit at the entrance to the bay into the open ocean and wrecking her. The husband and wife who made up her crew abandoned ship in a skiff as she sank and were rescued.
Libby 20	United States	The 16-gross register ton, 35.6-foot (10.9 m) fishing vessel was destroyed by fire in Bumble Bay (57°16′30″N 154°41′30″W) on the coast of Kodiak Island in the Territory of Alaska.
Sunmore	United States	1958 Lituya Bay earthquake and megatsunami: The 24-gross register ton, 39.4-foot (12.0 m) fishing vessel disappeared when a megatsunami she was trying to outrun engulfed her in Lituya Bay in Southeastern Alaska. The bodies of the husband and wife who made up her crew were never found.

=== 14 July ===
List of shipwrecks: 14 July 1958
Ship	State	Description
Uncle Sam	United States	The 25-gross register ton, 43.6-foot (13.3 m) fishing vessel sank in Cook Inlet at the north end of Kalgin Island in the Territory of Alaska.

=== 24 July ===
List of shipwrecks: 24 July 1958
Ship	State	Description
Jo	United States	The 11-gross register ton, 31.3-foot (9.5 m) fishing vessel was destroyed by fire in Canoe Pass (60°32′N 146°08′W) in Prince William Sound on the south-central coast of the Territory of Alaska.

== August ==
=== 5 August ===
List of shipwrecks: 5 August 1958
Ship	State	Description
Cabo Razo	Spain	The cargo ship sank in the Arosa Estuary off Pontevedra. Thirteen of the 44 people on board were killed.

=== 7 August ===
List of shipwrecks: 7 August 1958
Ship	State	Description
S.E. Graham, and Gulfoil	United States	The tanker S. E. Graham collided with the T3 tanker Gulfoil at the mouth of the Narragansett Bay; in the fire that resulted, at least 15 people were killed and 34 seriously injured. S. E. Graham was declared a total loss after she burned. Gulfoil caught fire and was beached. She was on a voyage from Providence, Rhode Island to Port Arthur, Texas. Although declared a total loss, she was lenghtened and converted to a cargo ship in 1961 and returned to service as Pioneer Challenger.

=== 8 August ===
List of shipwrecks: 8 August 1958
Ship	State	Description
Max	United States	The 8-gross register ton, 30.5-foot (9.3 m) fishing vessel was destroyed by fire approximately 6 nautical miles (11 km; 6.9 mi) from Port San Juan (60°03′N 148°04′W) on the south-central coast of the Territory of Alaska.
St Nicholas	Liberia	The cargo ship ran aground in the Caribbean Sea 135 nautical miles (250 km) off Kingston, Jamaica. Salvage efforts were abandoned in September and she was declared a total loss.

=== 11 August ===
List of shipwrecks: 11 August 1958
Ship	State	Description
Pen 18	United States	The 7-gross register ton 28.4-foot (8.7 m) fishing vessel sank in False Pass, Territory of Alaska.
Pen 29	United States	The 8-gross register ton 28.6-foot (8.7 m) fishing vessel sank in False Pass, Territory of Alaska.

=== 14 August ===
List of shipwrecks: 15 August 1958
Ship	State	Description
Black Witch II	Australia	The schooner, a converted tugboat, was wrecked at Apollo Bay, Victoria, Australia, during a storm.
Norse Lady	Panama	The cargo ship ran aground on an island in Indonesia. Seized by Permesta Rebels on 16 August and refloated.

=== 15 August ===
List of shipwrecks: 15 August 1958
Ship	State	Description
USS Hillsborough County	United States Navy	The decommissioned LST-542-class tank landing ship was sunk as a target in the Gulf of California.
Thrasher	United States	The 11-gross register ton, 38.1-foot (11.6 m) motor tug sank off Mary Island (an ambiguous reference, but most likely the Mary Island at 55°06′00″N 131°10′08″W) in the Territory of Alaska.

=== 21 August ===
List of shipwrecks: 21 August 1958
Ship	State	Description
Willemijn	Netherlands	The coaster ran aground on Burial Island, County Down, Northern Ireland.

=== 22 August ===
List of shipwrecks: 22 August 1958
Ship	State	Description
Norse Lady	Panama	The cargo ship had run aground off Parigi, Indonesia on 14 August. Permesta rebels captured her on 16 August, refloated her and beached her at Belang. The Indonesian Navy sighted her there on 18 August and shelled her on 22 August, setting her on fire. Norse Lady was burnt out and remained a beached wreck until March 1966, when she was towed to Kaohsiung, Taiwan and scrapped.

=== 24 August ===
List of shipwrecks: 24 August 1958
Ship	State	Description
No. 175	(China) People's Liberation Army Navy	Chinese Civil War: 1st Battle of Kinmen Island: The motor torpedo boat was shelled and sunk off Kinmen Island (Quemoy) by ROCS Wei Yuan, ROCS Tou Jiang, and ROCS Xiang Jiang all (Republic of China Navy). Four crewmen were killed, three were taken as prisoners of war.
ROCS Tai Sheng	Republic of China Navy	Chinese Civil War: 1st Battle of Kinmen Island: The transport was torpedoed and sunk off Kinmen Island (Quemoy) by No. 103, No. 105, No. 175, No. 178, No. 180, No. 184 (all (China) People's Liberation Army Navy). 200 troops killed.

=== 26 August ===
List of shipwrecks: 26 August 1958
Ship	State	Description
HNLMS De Zeven Provinciën	Royal Netherlands Navy	The De Zeven Provinciën-class cruiser collided with the harbour wall at Den Helder and ran aground. Refloated the next day.

== September ==
=== 2 September ===
List of shipwrecks: 2 September 1958
Ship	State	Description
Piet Schipper	Netherlands	Piet Schipper The coaster was driven ashore at Raversijde, West Flanders, Belgium.
No. 174	(China) People's Liberation Army Navy	Chinese Civil War: 2nd Battle of Kinmen Island: The motor torpedo boat was sunk by gunfire off Kinmen Island (Quemoy) by the patrol vessel ROCS Wei Yuan (Republic of China Navy).
No. 180	(China) People's Liberation Army Navy	Chinese Civil War: 2nd Battle of Kinmen Island: The motor torpedo boat was sunk by gunfire off Kinmen Island (Quemoy) by the patrol vessel ROCS Wei Yuan (Republic of China Navy).

=== 5 September ===
List of shipwrecks: 5 September 1958
Ship	State	Description
Ester	United States	The 9-gross register ton, 34-foot (10.4 m) fishing vessel was destroyed by fire in Camp Coogan Bay (57°00′30″N 135°14′00″W) in Southeast Alaska near Sitka, Territory of Alaska.

=== 8 September ===
List of shipwrecks: 8 September 1958
Ship	State	Description
Anna Maria	Portugal	The schooner caught fire in the Atlantic Ocean 200 nautical miles (370 km) south east of Cape Race, Newfoundland, Canada. The 40 crew were rescued by a Spanish trawler. The wreck was later sunk by USCGC Spencer (United States Navy) as it was a hazard to shipping.
ROCS Mei Le	Republic of China Navy	Chinese Civil War: The Mei Chin-class Landing ship medium blew up and sank when shelled by People's Liberation Army artillery. 91 crewmen and troops killed.

=== 10 September ===
List of shipwrecks: 10 September 1958
Ship	State	Description
Concha	Costa Rica	The coastal tanker caught fire off Milford Haven, Pembrokeshire, United Kingdom. All crew rescued by frigate HMS Chichester (Royal Navy). They were transferred to the tug Empire Rosa (United Kingdom) and landed at Milford Haven. The tug Sheila (United Kingdom) took Concha in tow but she sank 3 nautical miles (5.6 km) south of Skokholm.

=== 13 September ===
List of shipwrecks: 13 September 1958
Ship	State	Description
Fernand-Gilabert, and Melika	France; Liberia	The T2 tanker Fernand-Gilabert collided with the tanker Melika in the Arabian Sea off the coast of Oman. Both ships set on fire and abandoned; a total of 21 crew were killed. Fernand-Gilabert was on a voyage from Port-de-Bouc, Bouches-du-Rhône to Mina Al Ahmadi, Kuwait. She was towed to Karachi, Pakistan. She was consequently scrapped. Melika continued to steam at full speed. She was later taken in tow by HMS Bulwark (Royal Navy).

=== 17 September ===
List of shipwrecks: 17 September 1958
Ship	State	Description
Celtic	United States	The 8-gross register ton, 29.7-foot (9.1 m) fishing vessel was lost near Cape Strait (56.9983333°N 133.0908333°W) in Frederick Sound in the Alexander Archipelago in Southeast Alaska after she struck a log.

=== 18 September ===
List of shipwrecks: 18 September 1958
Ship	State	Description
Ashtabula	Canada	The car ferry sank after colliding with the cargo ship Ben Moreell off Ashtabula, Ohio. The captain was killed.

=== 19 September ===
List of shipwrecks: 19 September 1958
Ship	State	Description
Petropavlovsk	Soviet Navy	The Kirov-class cruiser was severely damaged in a typhoon in the Sea of Okhotsk with the loss of a crew member.

=== 24 September ===
List of shipwrecks: 24 September 1958
Ship	State	Description
Maxine M	United States	The 31-gross register ton, 44.6-foot (13.6 m) fishing vessel sank near Gravina Island in the Alexander Archipelago off Dall Head (55°08′N 131°45′W) in Southeast Alaska with the loss of five lives. Her sole survivor was rescued from floating debris in Clarence Strait by the fishing vessel Homer (United States).

=== 26 September ===
List of shipwrecks: 26 September 1958
Ship	State	Description
USS Hampden County	United States Navy	The decommissioned LST-542-class tank landing ship was sunk as a target in the Pacific Ocean off the coast of California.
Rangitiki	New Zealand	The ocean liner ran aground on the Goodwin Sands 6 nautical miles (11 km) off Deal, Kent, United Kingdom. Later refloated undamaged.

== October ==
=== 5 October ===
List of shipwrecks: 5 October 1958
Ship	State	Description
Ghanakust	Netherlands	The cargo ship collided with the ocean liner Monte Urbasa (Spain) in the Gironde. She caught fire, ran aground and was a total loss. The wreck was scrapped in situ.

=== 5 October ===
List of shipwrecks: 5 October 1958
Ship	State	Description
Tupavuori	Finland	The tanker caught fire, exploded and sank at Tupavuori, with the loss of ten crew.

=== 6 October ===
List of shipwrecks: 6 October 1958
Ship	State	Description
Hoi Wong	Norway	The passenger ship ran aground in the Paracel Islands, China.

=== 9 October ===
List of shipwrecks: 9 October 1958
Ship	State	Description
Hin Ann	Crown Colony of Singapore	The 170-ton cargo ship sank, or was run aground, in a storm off northern Sumatra.

=== 21 October ===
List of shipwrecks: 21 October 1958
Ship	State	Description
USS Chittenden County	United States Navy	The decommissioned LST-542-class tank landing ship was sunk as a target in the Pacific Ocean south of Oahu, Hawaii.

=== 22 October ===
List of shipwrecks: 22 October 1958
Ship	State	Description
Barge No. 18	United States	While under tow by the tug Wando (United States), the tank barge was wrecked without loss of life on Shemya Island in the Aleutian Islands.
Zeta Trader	United Kingdom	The cargo ship ran aground off Pulau Mantaras, 35 nautical miles (65 km) south of Singapore. Refloated on 29 October.

=== 23 October ===
List of shipwrecks: 23 October 1958
Ship	State	Description
Earsdon	United Kingdom	The cargo ship sank in the River Tyne following a collision. Raised in March 1959 and scrapped.

=== 31 October ===
List of shipwrecks: 31 October 1958
Ship	State	Description
Corijs	Netherlands	The lightship sank in the Scheldt estuary after she was hit by Selvik (Norway). All five crew rescued.

=== Unknown October ===
List of shipwrecks: Unknown October 1958
Ship	State	Description
USS LSSL-57	United States Navy	The LCS(L)-class landing craft was shelled and sunk as a target sometime in 1958, probably October.

== November ==
=== 2 November ===
List of shipwrecks: 2 November 1958
Ship	State	Description
Prince Philippe	Belgium	The ferry ran aground at Dover, Kent, United Kingdom. Refloated two hours later.

=== 3 November ===
List of shipwrecks: 3 November 1958
Ship	State	Description
Lake Burnaby	Canada	The 6,140 GRT freighter was stranded on Bancorran Reef, Philippines and declared a total loss

=== 13 November ===
List of shipwrecks: 13 November 1958
Ship	State	Description
Forresbank	United Kingdom	The cargo ship (5,155 GRT, 1925) caught fire and came ashore 25 nautical miles (46 km) south of Port St. Johns, Eastern Cape, South Africa. She was on a voyage from Cape Town to Durban. One life was lost.

=== 16 November ===
List of shipwrecks: 16 November 1958
Ship	State	Description
Nyon	Switzerland	Nyon's stern section under tow in 1959. The cargo ship ran aground at St Abb's Head, Berwickshire, Scotland. Stern section salvaged and new bow section fitted in 1959, returned to service.
Valhall	Norway	The Liberty ship ran aground in Vatlestraumen. She was refloated.

=== 18 November ===
List of shipwrecks: 18 November 1958
Ship	State	Description
Carl D. Bradley	United States	Part of the rweck of Carl D. Bradley in 2007. The lake freighter — a 629-foot (192 m), 10,028-gross register ton bulk carrier — hogged, broke in two, and sank in 310 to 380 feet (94 to 116 m) of water during a storm in Lake Michigan 12 nautical miles (22 km; 14 mi) southwest of Gull Island with the loss of 33 of her crew of 35.
Haida Maid	United States	The 33-foot (10.1 m) motor vessel disappeared in a snow squall in Lynn Canal near Haines, Territory of Alaska. Wreckage from Haida Maid – containing the body of the only person aboard – came ashore in Sanki Inlet near Dyea, Territory of Alaska, on 29 November.

=== 22 November ===
List of shipwrecks: 22 November 1958
Ship	State	Description
A S P No. 7	United States	The 28-gross register ton, 47.6-foot (14.5 m) scow sank in Cook Inlet on the south-central coast of the Territory of Alaska approximately 20 nautical miles (37 km; 23 mi) north of Seldovia.

=== 23 November ===
List of shipwrecks: 23 November 1958
Ship	State	Description
Caltex Wellington	United Kingdom	The Type T2-SE-A2 tanker ran aground in the Suez Canal, 12 nautical miles (22 km) south of Port Said, Egypt. Later refloated.
Dansborg	Denmark	The tanker ran aground in the Suez Canal 12 nautical miles (22 km) south of Port Said. Later refloated.

== December ==
=== 1 December ===
List of shipwrecks: 1 December 1958
Ship	State	Description
Indore	United Kingdom	The cargo ship ran aground off Vlissingen, Netherlands.

=== 3 December ===
List of shipwrecks: 3 December 1958
Ship	State	Description
Prodromos	Liberia	The Liberty ship collided with King Minos (Greece) in the English Channel and was abandoned. Twenty-three crew rescued by two Dutch ships. The tug Jean Bart (France) took Prodromos in tow and she was beached at Rye Harbour, Sussex, United Kingdom. King Minos was assisted into Dover Harbour, Kent by the tug Dominant and salvage ship Swin (both United Kingdom).

=== 5 December ===
List of shipwrecks: 5 December 1958
Ship	State	Description
Alex	West Germany	The coaster collided with a Dutch vessel in the Waal and sank. All five crew were rescued.

=== 10 December ===
List of shipwrecks: 10 December 1958
Ship	State	Description
Tarleton H. Bean	United States	After a gale struck and trapped the 35-foot (11 m) herring fishing vessel in ice around a small projection of land in Taku Inlet in Southeast Alaska, her three-man crew of Alaska Fish and Wildlife Service employees conducting herring research abandoned her and boarded the buoy tender USCGC Sweetbriar ( United States Coast Guard) unharmed. By the time a power barge arrived to recover Tarleton H. Bean, she had disappeared, and she was never seen again.

=== 14 December ===
List of shipwrecks: 14 December 1958
Ship	State	Description
Mendi Palm	United Kingdom	The cargo ship collided with a Port of London Authority dredger in the Thames Estuary and ran aground.

=== 15 December ===
List of shipwrecks: 17 December 1958
Ship	State	Description
Argonaftis	(Greece) Royal Hellenic Navy	The V-class submarine broke her tow and came ashore on the northern coast of Spain. She was refloated and scrapped.
Lena	United States	The 22-gross register ton, 44.5-foot (13.6 m) scow sank off Yakutat, Territory of Alaska.

=== 17 December ===
List of shipwrecks: 17 December 1958
Ship	State	Description
HMS Volatile	Royal Navy	The V-class submarine broke her tow and came ashore at Sandsend Wyke, Yorkshire whilst being towed to the Tyne for scrapping. Refloated on 23 December.

=== 18 December ===
List of shipwrecks: 18 December 1958
Ship	State	Description
Taxiarchis	Greece	The cargo ship ran aground in the Aegean Sea between Kos and Turkey. Refloated on 23 December, repairs were uneconomic and she was scrapped in August 1959.

=== 20 December ===
List of shipwrecks: 20 December 1958
Ship	State	Description
K S M No. 1	United States	The 63-gross register ton, 60-foot (18.3 m) scow sank in Kendrick Bay (54°51′15″N 131°58′00″W) (or Kindricks Bay) in Southeast Alaska.

=== 23 December ===
List of shipwrecks: 23 December 1958
Ship	State	Description
Broughty	United Kingdom	The coaster collided with Sunima (Norway) in the Thames Estuary and was beached on the Rainham Marshes, Essex.

=== 28 December ===
List of shipwrecks: 28 December 1958
Ship	State	Description
African Queen	Liberia	Stern of the wrecked tanker African Queen. The tanker ran aground on Gull Shoal and broke in two. The crew was rescued by the U.S. Coast Guard. Oil from the tanker heavily polluted the coastline at Ocean City, Maryland.

=== 30 December ===
List of shipwrecks: 30 December 1958
Ship	State	Description
Murre	United States	The 7-gross register ton, 29.6-foot (9.0 m) fishing vessel was destroyed by fire at Cordova, Territory of Alaska.

=== 31 December ===
List of shipwrecks: 31 December 1958
Ship	State	Description
Seabird	Norway	The cargo steamer, a former Flower-class corvette, was smuggling for Permesta rebels in Minahasa, North Sulawesi when the Indonesian Air Force intercepted and sank her in Bolaang Bay.

=== Unknown December ===
List of shipwrecks: Unknown December 1958
Ship	State	Description
USS LSSL-52	United States Navy	The LCS(L)-class landing craft was shelled and sunk as a target.

== Unknown date ==
List of shipwrecks: Unknown date 1958
Ship	State	Description
Ben Dearg	Australia	The trawler, a former Castle class naval trawler, was purchased by the Royal Australian Navy, used as a target and sunk sometime in 1958.
Los Mayas	Panama	The cargo ship ran aground at Muskegon, Michigan, United States, and was holed. Later repaired and returned to service.
Tuamotu	Unknown	The vessel, a former United States Navy coastal minesweeper, sank at Tahiti.

== Sources ==
- Sawyer, L. A.; Mitchell, W. H. (1974). Victory Ships and Tankers. Newton Abbot: David and Charles. ISBN 0 7153 6036 1.
- Sawyer, L. A.; Mitchell, W. H. (1985). The Liberty Ships (2nd ed.). London: Lloyd's of London Press Ltd. ISBN 1-85044-049-2.
