= Allen Lawrence Pope =

American military aviator (1928–2020)

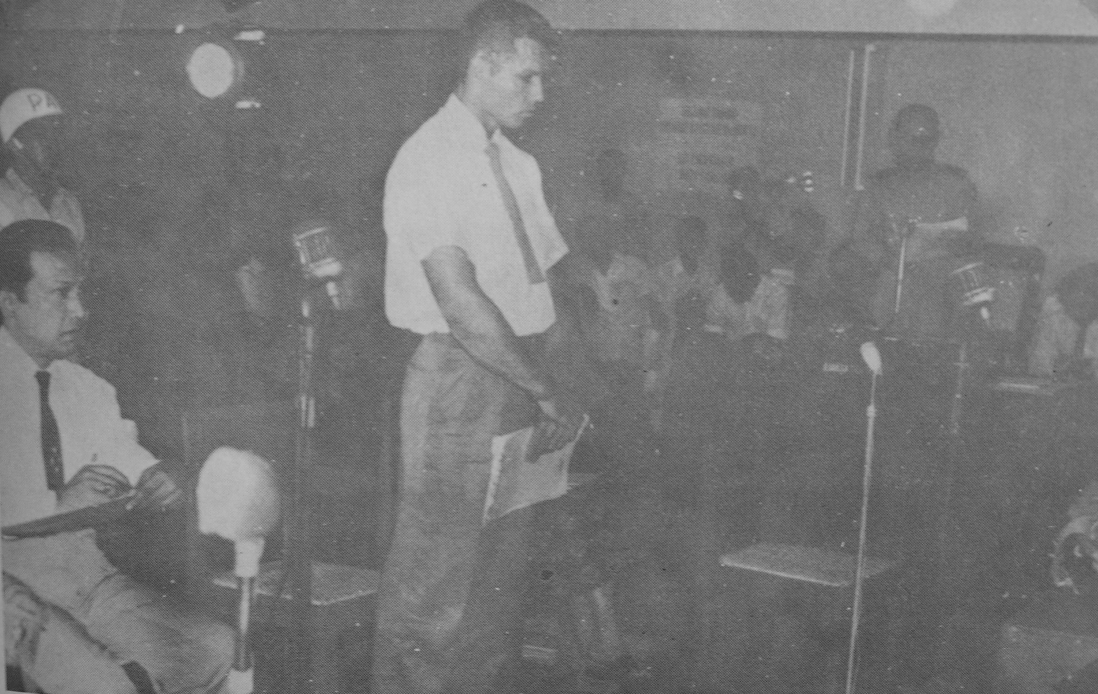
- Pope on trial in Jakarta, December 1959
- Born: October 20, 1928; Miami, Florida, U.S.
- Died: April 4, 2020 (aged 91); U.S.
- Burial place: Arlington National Cemetery, Virginia, U.S.
- Military career
- Allegiance: United States
- Branch: United States Air Force; Central Intelligence Agency
- Rank: First lieutenant
- Conflicts: Korean War; First Indochina War; Permesta Rebellion
- Awards: Air Medal (3); Distinguished Flying Cross; Chevalier de la Légion d'honneur
- Other work: Flight instructor

Allen Lawrence Pope (October 20, 1928 – April 4, 2020) was an American military and paramilitary aviator. He rose to international attention as the subject of a diplomatic dispute between the United States and Indonesia after the B-26 Invader (Note: Not to be confused with B-26 Marauder) aircraft he was piloting in a Central Intelligence Agency (CIA) covert operation was shot down over Ambon on May 18, 1958, during the "Indonesian Crisis".

Pope's aviation career began with the United States Air Force, serving with distinction flying bombing missions in the Korean War. He transferred to the CIA in 1954, which he also served with distinction flying transport missions in the First Indochina War.

In the Permesta rebellion in Indonesia in 1958, Pope again flew bombing missions for the CIA. Shot down by government forces, he was captured and held under house arrest for just over four years. In 1960, an Indonesian court condemned him to death, but considerable back-channel negotiations led to his release by President Sukarno in 1962. Pope returned to the United States and subsequently flew CIA covert missions in other theaters.

In 2005, France made Pope a Chevalier de la Légion d'honneur for his service in Indochina.

== Biography ==
Pope was born in Miami, Florida on October 20, 1928. Pope "was the son of a moderately prosperous fruit grower in Perrine, Florida, just south of Miami.... [he spent time busting] broncos in Texas." He graduated from the University of Florida, After university, Pope entered the U.S. Air Force and served as a first lieutenant in the Korean War. He flew a Douglas B-26 Invader in combat, receiving three Air Medals and a Distinguished Flying Cross. After the war, the U.S. Air Force returned Pope to the United States as an Air Force instructor.

=== Điện Biên Phủ ===
In March 1954, Pope left the U.S. Air Force and joined a CIA front organization, Civil Air Transport (CAT), flying one of its Fairchild C-119 Flying Boxcars to supply French forces besieged in the Battle of Điện Biên Phủ in French Indochina. On March 13, Việt Minh artillery disabled Điện Biên Phủ's airstrip, forcing the French garrison there to be supplied by air drop. CAT pilots flew hundreds of sorties from Cat Bi to Điện Biên Phủ. On May 6, 1954, the day before the French force surrendered, Pope was co-pilot of the lead aircraft in a group of six C-119s that made the last air drop to the besieged garrison. Pope remained with CAT at the end of the First Indochina War that August, initially making civilian charter flights from Taiwan, later from Saigon.

=== Indonesian crisis ===
In April 1958, CAT recalled Pope from Saigon to Taiwan and sent him to Clark Air Base in the Philippines, where he was assigned a B-26 Invader that had been painted black and had its markings obscured. His destination was Indonesia, to participate in a covert operation intended to overthrow Communist-leaning president Sukarno and topple his Guided Democracy in Indonesia regime. There he was to link up with Permesta rebels, insurgents led by dissident local army officers.

On April 27, 1958, Pope landed his bomber at Mapanget, a rebel-held Indonesian Air Force base on the Minahassa Peninsula of northern Sulawesi. He joined fellow CAT pilot and former U.S. Air Force officer, William H. Beale, who had been flying a B-26 Invader for Permesta's Angkatan Udara Revolusioner ("Revolutionary Air Force", or AUREV) since April 19.

Pope flew his first AUREV mission on April 27, attacking the government-held island of Morotai in the hours before a Permesta amphibious force successfully landed and took the island. The CIA instructed CAT pilots to target commercial shipping in order to frighten foreign merchant ships away from Indonesian waters, thereby weakening the Indonesian economy and undermining Sukarno's government. On April 28, Pope attacked the government-held province of Central Sulawesi. One source asserts that off the port of Donggala, he bombed and sank three merchant ships: SS Aquila (Italian), SS Armonia (Greek) and SS Flying Lark (registered in Panama). Pope continued the sortie by attacking Palu, the provincial capital city, destroying 22 vehicles in a truck park. Aquila was certainly bombed and sunk by an AUREV aircraft. However, a wreck off Ambon Island, more than 500 miles (800 km) east of Donggala, has now been identified as Aquila. Another source suggests that Aquila was bombed not on April 28 but on May 1 or 2.

On April 29, Pope attacked the government-held province of South East Sulawesi. He struck the Indonesian Air Force base at Kendari, the provincial capital, with 500 lb (230 kg) bombs and machine-gun fire. He then strafed an Indonesian Navy patrol boat, KRI Intana, killing five crew and wounding another 23. On April 30, Pope again attacked Palu and Donggala; sinking a ship, destroying a warehouse and demolishing a bridge. On May 1, Pope attacked the city of Ambon, the provincial capital of Maluku. His four 500 lb bombs missed his waterfront targets and fell in the sea. He then tried a strafing run, but his starboard engine suffered an explosion. Pope aborted the attack and returned to Mapanget.

It took several days for the B-26 to be given a replacement starboard engine. Pope's next sortie was on May 7, when he again attacked the government airbase at Ambon. He seriously damaged a Douglas C-47 Skytrain and a North American P-51 Mustang and caused other damage on the airbase. On May 8, he attacked the Palu area in the morning and Ambon in the afternoon. On Ambon, he bombed and machine-gunned the government-held Liang airbase in the northeast of the island, damaging the runway and destroying a Consolidated PBY Catalina. He then continued to Ambon city where he attacked an Indonesian Navy gunboat at anchor. His bomb missed, but he then attacked with machine-guns, wounding two crew and damaging the gunboat. Since May 1, Beale and his B-26 had been resting at Clark Air Base, leaving Pope's aircraft as AUREV's only active bomber. On May 9, Beale returned to Mapanget, releasing Pope who then took his turn to fly to Clark for several days' leave.

On May 15, Pope attacked a small transport ship, the Naiko, in Ambon Bay. She was a merchant ship that the Indonesian Government had pressed into military service, and was bringing a company of Ambonese troops home from East Java. Pope's bomb hit the Naiko's engine room, killing one crew member and 16 infantrymen and setting the ship on fire. He then attacked Ambon city, aiming for the barracks. His first bomb missed and exploded in a market-place next door. His next landed in the barracks compound, but bounced and exploded near an ice factory. He then returned to Mapanget to find that in his absence, the Indonesian Air Force had bombed the rebel air base, destroying a CIA/AUREV PBY Catalina and damaging a CIA/AUREV P-51 Mustang.

The Indonesian government reported that Pope's bombing of a marketplace in Ambon city had killed a large number of civilians. The U.S. Embassy in Jakarta protested to the United States Department of State, which then warned the CIA team in Manado. The CIA tightened its AUREV pilots' rules of engagement to attacking only airfields and boats. Even military buildings were prohibited.

=== Capture ===
By mid-May, Indonesian government forces were planning amphibious counter-attacks on the islands of Morotai and Halmahera that Permesta had captured toward the end of April. This involved assembling a naval and transport fleet in Ambon bay, where ships started to arrive from Java on May 16. At 0300 on May 18, Pope took off from Mapanget to attack Ambon again. He first attacked the airfield, destroying the C-47 and P-51 that he had damaged on May 7. A short distance west of Ambon Bay, he found the invasion fleet, which included two 7,000-ton merchant ships being used as troop transports. One of the transports, the Sawega, was trying to take evasive maneuvers as Pope attacked it; his bomb fell in the sea 40 metres (130 ft) short of its target.

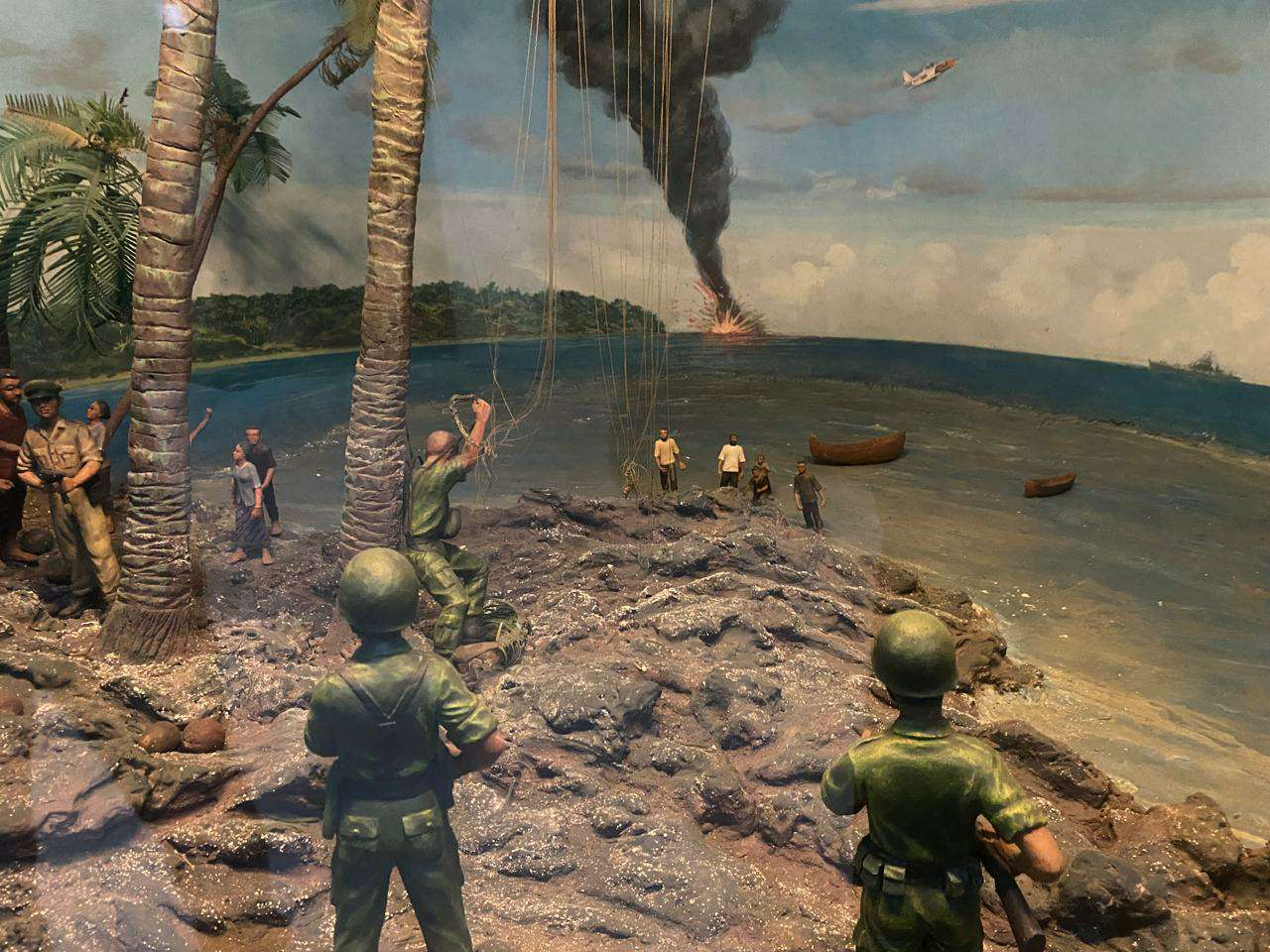
Diorama depicting the crash of the plane and the capture of Allen Pope

The Indonesian Air Force had one serviceable P-51 Mustang on Ambon, at Liang airbase. When Pope attacked Ambon airfield on May 18, the P-51 flown by Ignatius Dewanto at Liang was scrambled to repel him. Dewanto closed on the B-26 just as Pope was attacking the Sawega. The convoy took both aircraft to be AUREV and fired on both of them. Dewanto also hit the B-26, damaging its starboard wing and the bomber caught fire. Pope and his Permesta radio operator, Jan Harry Rantung, bailed out. As they jumped, the B-26 was entering a sharp dive and the slipstream threw Pope against the tail fin, fracturing his right leg. They landed on the coast of Pulau Hatala, a small island west of Ambon, where a small Indonesian Navy landing party from one of the invasion fleet's minesweepers was put ashore and captured them.

Some 20 other AUREV insurgent aircraft were reported to have been seen with Nationalist Chinese markings obscured by hasty coats of paint. Their pilots were Nationalist Chinese and Americans from CAT.

=== Trial, conviction and release ===
U.S. Ambassador Howard P. Jones portrayed Pope as an American "paid soldier of fortune" and expressed his regret at the involvement of an American. However, when he was captured Pope was carrying about 30 incriminating documents, including his flight log, that substantially added to the embarrassment of the Eisenhower administration in the U.S.A.

Pope admitted to flying only one or two missions, but his flight log recorded eight and another source states that he flew a total of 12. Pope "spent the early hours of Sunday, May 18, over Ambon City in eastern Indonesia, sinking a navy ship, bombing a market, and destroying a church. The official death toll was six civilians and seventeen military officers". When Pope was shot down by anti-aircraft fire, he was pursuing a ship carrying one thousand Indonesian troops. "His last bomb missed the troopship by about forty feet, sparing hundreds of lives".

After fracturing his right thigh when bailing out, Pope was held not in prison but under house arrest at the small mountain resort of Kaliurang, where his injury was given "excellent medical attention". He said he felt he was fighting international communism. An Indonesian four-man military court rejected Pope's plea to be considered a prisoner of war. On April 29, 1960, it found him guilty of killing 17 members of Indonesia's armed forces and six civilians and sentenced him to death.

The execution was not carried out, but Pope remained under house arrest. He was used as a bargaining chip in Indonesian negotiations with the United States for arms. He was eventually exchanged with 10 Lockheed C-130 Hercules transport planes. In February 1962, U.S. Attorney General Robert F. Kennedy paid President Sukarno a goodwill visit and pleaded for Pope's release. Sukarno also received a visit from Pope's wife, mother and sister, who all tearfully pleaded for his pardon. On July 2, 1962, Pope was quietly driven to the airport and put on a U.S. plane out of Indonesia. Sukarno told Pope:

I want no propaganda about it. Now go. Lose yourself in the USA secretly. Don't show yourself publicly. Don't give out news stories. Don't issue statements. Just go home, hide yourself, get lost, and we'll forget the whole thing.

=== Southern Air Transport ===
After his release from Indonesian imprisonment in 1962 Pope returned to Miami, where he joined Southern Air Transport (SAT). Like CAT, SAT was a CIA front organization flying covert missions in regions including southeast Asia.

== Recognition ==
On February 24, 2005, France's ambassador to the US, Jean-David Levitte, made the then 76-year-old Pope and six other CAT pilots Chevaliers de la Légion d'Honneur for their service in the Battle of Điện Biên Phủ. In 2005, Pope said of his Vietnam service:

I'm a communist fighter. I was born and raised to be against the communists.

Of his Indonesian experience in 1958 he had elsewhere observed:

I enjoyed killing Communists… They said Indonesia was a failure [Al Pope reflected bitterly], but we knocked the shit out of them. We killed thousands of Communists, even though half of them probably didn't even know what Communism meant.

== Death ==
Pope died on April 4, 2020, at the age of 91. He was buried at Arlington National Cemetery.

== Sources ==
- Conboy, Kenneth; Morrison, James (1999). Feet to the Fire CIA Covert Operations in Indonesia, 1957–1958. Annapolis: Naval Institute Press. pp. 100, 106, 114–22, 125, 128–29, 132–33, 136, 139, 141–42, 161–62, 166. ISBN 1-55750-193-9.
- Kahin, Audrey R; Kahin, George McT (1997) [1995]. Subversion as Foreign Policy The Secret Eisenhower and Dulles Debacle in Indonesia. Seattle and London: University of Washington Press. ISBN 0-295-97618-7.
- Lert, Frederic (1998). Wings of the CIA. Paris: Histoire et Collections. ISBN 290818270X.
- Prados, John (2003). Lost Crusader: the Secret Wars of CIA Director William Colby. New York: Oxford University Press. p. 177. ISBN 0195128478.
- Weiner, Tim (2007). Legacy of Ashes: The History of the CIA. New York: Doubleday. pp. 176–177. ISBN 978-1846140464.
