= USS St. Clair County =

1945 LST-542-class tank landing ship

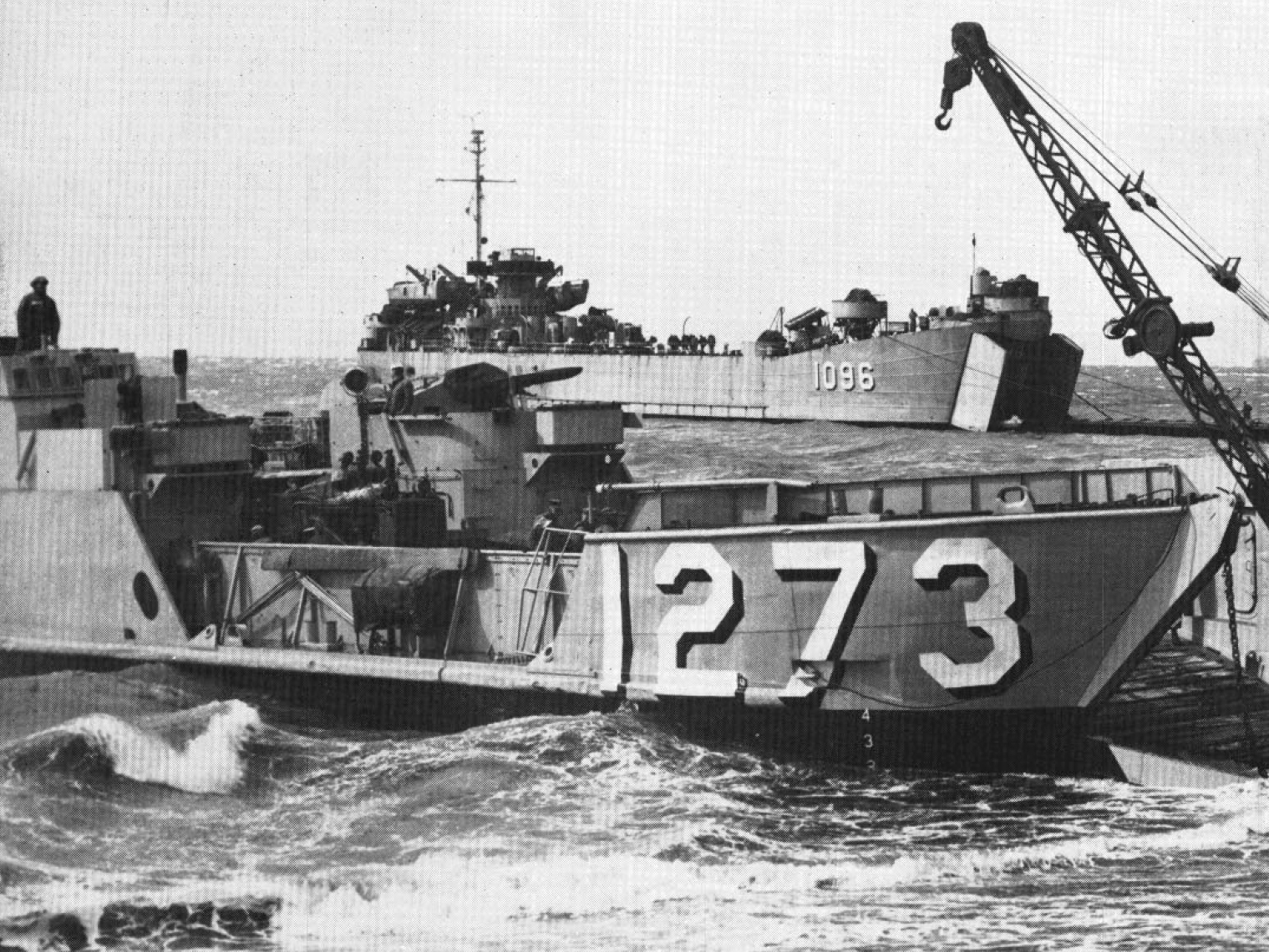
- LCU-1273 and St. Clair County in 1956

History

United States
- Name: USS LST-1069
- Builder: Jeffersonville Boat and Machinery Co.; Jeffersonville, Indiana
- Laid down: 27 November 1944
- Launched: 10 January 1945
- Sponsored by: Mrs. Elizabeth L. Middleton
- Commissioned: 2 February 1945
- Decommissioned: 24 August 1946
- Reinstated: August 1950
- Recommissioned: 3 October 1950
- Renamed: USS St. Clair County (LST=1096), 1 July 1955
- Namesake: Counties in 4 U.S. states: St. Clair County, Alabama; St. Clair County, Illinois; St. Clair County, Michigan; St. Clair County, Missouri.
- Decommissioned: 26 September 1969
- Stricken: 1 April 1975
- Home port: San Diego (from November 1950)
- Identification: IMO number: 7629910
- Honors and awards: 1 battle star, World War II; 3 battle stars, Korean War; 2 battle stars, Vietnam War; Navy Unit Commendation, Vietnam War
- Fate: Sold for commercial service, 1975; Scrapped, 1988

General characteristics
- Class & type: LST-542-class LST
- Displacement: 1,490 tons (light); 4,080 tons (full load of 2,100 tons)
- Length: 328 feet (100 m)
- Beam: 50 feet (15.2 m)
- Draft: 8 ft (2.4 m) forward; 14 ft 4 in (4.4 m) aft (full load)
- Propulsion: Two General Motors 12-567 diesel engines, two shafts, twin rudders
- Speed: 10.8 knots (20 km/h) (max); 9 knots (17 km/h) (econ)
- Complement: 7 officers, 204 enlisted
- Armament: 8 × 40 mm guns; 12 × 20 mm guns

USS St. Clair County (LST-1096) was a LST-542-class tank landing ship built for the United States Navy in World War II. Like most of the ships of her class she was originally known only by her designation, USS LST-1096, and, like all remaining LSTs, was renamed on 1 July 1955. She was named for counties in Alabama, Illinois, Michigan, and Missouri.

== Operational history ==
=== World War II ===
LST-1096 was laid down on 27 November 1944 by the Jeffersonville Boat and Machinery Co., Jeffersonville, Indiana; launched on 10 January 1945; sponsored by Mrs. Elizabeth L. Middleton; and commissioned on 2 February 1945.

Following shakedown off Florida, LST-1096 prepared for duty in the Pacific. In early March, she took on pontoons and ammunition as cargo; and, on 11 March, sailed for the Panama Canal. From there, she continued on to the Marshalls, the Marianas, and the Western Carolines, arriving at Ulithi in early May. For the next two months, she supported operations in the Ryukyus; then, on 1 July, headed south to the Philippines. Most of July was spent in the Leyte area. At the end of the month, she moved up to Luzon to prepare for further amphibious operations; but, with the Japanese surrender, she returned to Okinawa with occupation troops. Further occupation duties followed; and, into November, she carried troops and supplies from the Philippines and Okinawa to Japan. In December, carrying returning veterans as passengers and heavy equipment including one LCT as cargo, she headed east and arrived at San Francisco in mid-January 1946.

Ordered deactivated, she moved to Astoria, Oregon, in May for "mothballing." The ship was decommissioned on 24 August and berthed with the Reserve Fleet, where she remained through the end of the decade.

=== Korean War ===
In June 1950, the North Korean People's Army crossed the 38th parallel into the Republic of Korea in an attempt to unify the divided country by force. As a part of the American build-up of military and naval forces, LST-1096 was ordered activated in August. She was recommissioned on 3 October; and, after a month at Bremerton, she moved down the coast to her home port, San Diego.

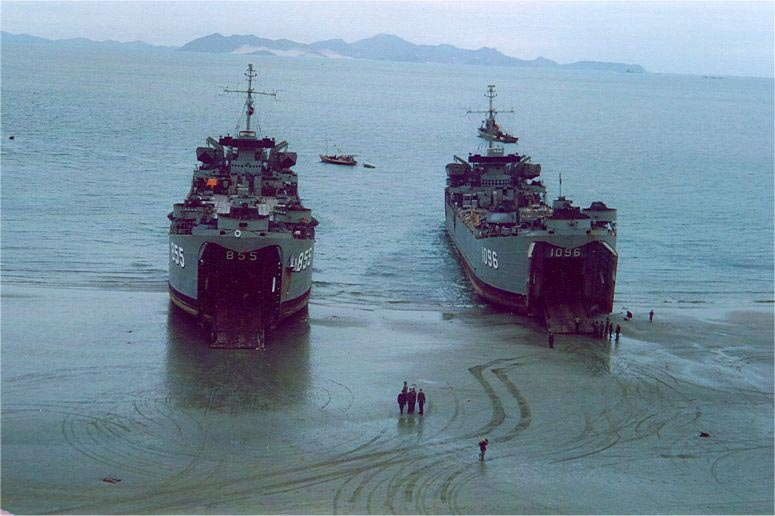
Kent County (LST-855) and St. Clair County beached at Baengnyeong Island, Korea, in December 1953.

For the next two months, the LST trained out of San Diego; and, in mid-February 1951, she headed for Hawaii, Japan, and Korea. March was spent in exercising in Hawaiian waters; and, at the end of April, she arrived in Yokosuka to take up duties supporting United Nations operations in Korea. She conducted amphibious training exercises in Japanese waters; shuttled cargo and personnel between Japan and Korea; and transported prisoners of war (POWs) from the South Korean mainland to the camps on the offshore islands. In November, she completed her last run and headed home.

In mid-December, LST-1096 arrived at San Diego. Overhaul, type exercises, and coastal cargo runs occupied the next eight months; and, in September 1952, the ship got underway for the Far East. By mid-October, she had arrived at Yokosuka and, a fortnight later, was conducting amphibious training exercises on the Honshū coast. She then returned to carrying cargo and personnel to Korea. She also was busy returning prisoners of war, scheduled to be exchanged, to the Korean peninsula.

After the truce agreement was reached in July 1953, LST-1096 continued her POW shuttle runs, from the camps to the mainland, and completed her last run, from Koje Do to Pusan, on 10 August. Three days later, she returned to Japan, then continued east, arriving at San Diego at the end of September.

=== Mid-1950s to mid-1960s ===
In October, the LST shifted to Long Beach, where she remained for repairs and overhaul into 1954. In January, she returned to San Diego; put back to Long Beach for further work in early February; then commenced refresher training. In April, she began moving west again; and, on 25 April, arrived in Yokosuka to begin her first peacetime Western Pacific (WestPac) deployment. Through most of the summer, she conducted exercises in Japanese, Korean, and Okinawan waters. In mid-August, she was ordered south; and, for three months, participated in Operation Passage to Freedom, the transportation of people from the newly created Democratic Republic of Vietnam, north of the 17th parallel, to the National State of Vietnam, south of that line. Operating between Haiphong and Tourane, she completed her last run from north to south in mid-November; visited Hong Kong; then returned to Japan. In February 1955, she returned to San Diego; and, for the next eleven months, remained on the West Coast.

Named St. Clair County (LST-1096) in July 1955, she sailed west again in February 1956. Training operations in Japanese, Korean, and Okinawan waters were interrupted only once, by a cruise to the Philippines in July, during her WestPac stay. In September, she moved east; and, in October, reached California.

Through the end of the 1950s and into 1960, St. Clair County rotated regularly between training exercises, cargo runs, and overhauls on the west coast and similar exercises and cargo operations with the 7th Fleet in the western Pacific. During 1960, she also participated in the making of two motion pictures: one in May while deployed to WestPac; the other — the Pat Boone vehicle All Hands on Deck, — in December in California coastal waters. She appeared in the opening scenes of "The World of Suzie Wong" anchored in the harbor as the Kowloon Ferry passes in foreground.

From 1961 to 1963, St. Clair County's schedule was altered, and her annual deployments took her only to the mid-Pacific, where she participated in amphibious exercises and conducted cargo operations for Service Force, Pacific. A FRAM II overhaul and refresher training occupied most of 1964.

In January 1965, the LST resumed WestPac operations. Only briefly deployed, she departed her home port to participate in a west coast operation and ended by carrying marines and their equipment via Hawaii to Okinawa. In May, after a visit to Japan, she returned to San Diego. From mid-August to November, she retraced the itinerary she had followed from January to May. Then, through the end of the year, she remained on the west coast.

=== Vietnam War ===
The LST sailed west again on 14 January 1966; and, late in February, commenced logistic support duty for combat operations in her third war. On 25 February, after a stop at Okinawa, she offloaded miscellaneous cargo, vehicles, and personnel at Chu Lai, South Vietnam; then proceeded to Subic Bay. She briefly remained there for upkeep and loading before returning to Vietnam to operate as a unit of TF 76 in that embattled country's coastal waters.

In March, she offloaded ammunition cargo at Da Nang; took on vehicles at Qui Nhon; and transported them to Vũng Tàu. On 30 March, she moved up to Saigon; and, on 4 April, returned to Vũng Tàu, whence she transited the Mekong and Bassac Rivers to call at Cần Thơ. There, she discharged cargo and loaded damaged vehicles which she carried to Saigon. After another run to Cần Thơ, she returned to the Philippines for availability; and, in June, resumed operations in Vietnam. Through that month, she shuttled cargo between Chu Lai and Da Nang. In July, she underwent repairs in the Philippines; and, in August, she got underway to return to San Diego via Hong Kong, Sasebo, Yokosuka, and Pearl Harbor.

Arriving back at her home port on 23 September, St. Clair County underwent voyage repairs, then resumed exercises off the southern California coast. In the spring of 1967, she participated in exercises in Hawaiian waters, then returned to the west coast for a three-month overhaul. In November, she resumed local exercises; and, early in 1968, completed her first "over-the-beach-hi-line" evolution. In June, she headed west.

The LST remained in WestPac through the remainder of the year, ferrying troops and cargo between Cửa Việt Base and Danang and providing logistic support to riverine forces in the Mekong Delta. On 26 January, she completed the cruise. Repairs and local operations followed her return to San Diego. During the summer, she conducted amphibious exercises at San Clemente and Oceanside; visited British Columbia; then returned to San Diego to prepare for inactivation. Ordered to Bremerton, she moved north and was decommissioned there on 26 September 1969. She remained at Bremerton as a unit of the Pacific Reserve Fleet.

=== Decommissioning and post-Navy career ===
Struck from the Navy List on 1 April 1975, she was sold for scrapping 1 December 1975. Ultimately saved, she operated under the name LST 5 for a Singapore-based concern, and as the Greek-flagged Petrola 145 for a Panamanian organization. She was sold for scrapping in 1988.

LST-1096 earned one battle star for her World War II service; three during the Korean War; and two for service off Vietnam.
