= Ionion =

Ionion may refer to

- Iónion Pélagos (Ιόνιον Πέλαγος), the Greek name for the Ionian Sea

Ships given this name:

- SS Honduras, a banana boat built in 1915 and named SS Ionion 1955–57
- MV Empire Sportsman, a coaster built in 1943 and named MV Ionion 1963–85
