= SS Norse Lady =

History
- Name: SS War Glade (1919); SS Norefos (1920–21); SS Norefjord (1921–49); SS Ryvarden (1949–58); SS Norse Lady (1958)
- Owner: Thor Thoresens Linje (1920–21); Den norske Amerikalinje (1921–49); F.N. Nordbø (1949–53); Rolf Wigands Rederi (1953–55); Halvorsen Shipping Co (1955–58); Pan-Norse Steamship Co (1958)
- Port of registry: (Norway) Kristiania (1915–25); (Norway) Oslo (1925–49); (Norway) Haugesund (1949–55); (Norway) Bergen (1955–58); (Panama) (1958)
- Builder: Wood, Skinner & Co, Newcastle upon Tyne, UK
- Yard number: 214
- Launched: 11 Sep 1919
- Completed: Jan 1920
- Out of service: 22 August 1958
- Identification: Code Letters LCUF; (1921–49)
- Fate: Ran aground off Sulawesi 14 August 1958; captured by Permesta rebels and beached 16 Aug; shelled by Indonesian Navy 22 August 1958; scrapped Kaohsiung, Taiwan, 1966

General characteristics
- Class & type: War C
- Type: Cargo ship
- Tonnage: 3,082 GRT 1,917 NRT
- Length: 331.7 ft (101.1 m)
- Beam: 46.7 ft (14.2 m)
- Draught: 28.1 ft (8.6 m)
- Propulsion: 1 North Eastern Marine Eng. Co. 3-cylinder triple-expansion steam engine

SS Norse Lady was a cargo ship built by Wood, Skinner and Company of Newcastle upon Tyne to the United Kingdom's standard First World War "War C" design. She traded from 1920 until 1958, in which time she had six successive owners and four different names. In 1958 she ran aground in eastern Indonesia, was captured and beached by rebels, and then set on fire by a naval bombardment. She remained a wreck until 1966, when she was scrapped in Taiwan.

== Owners and names ==
Wood, Skinner and Co laid her down in 1919 as War Glade, a standard "War" name for ships built under the UK's First World War merchant shipbuilding scheme. However, she was completed in January 1920 as Norefos for Skibs Aksjeselskap Thor Thoresens Linje of Norway, who registered her in Kristiania. In 1921 she was sold to Den Norske Amerikalinje Aksjeselskap ("Norwegian America Line") who renamed her Norefjord and added her to its Skandinaviske Øst-Afrika Linje ("Scandinavia East Africa Line") fleet. In 1949 she was sold to F.N. Nordbø of Haugesund, Norway who renamed her Ryvarden. She was laid up in Haugesund in 1953 and sold to Rolf Wigands Rederi of Bergen in 1954. Rolf Wigands sold her to Halvorsen Shipping Co of Bergen in 1956. She kept the name Ryvarden until 1958, when Halvorsen sold her to Pan-Norse Steamship Co of Panama, who renamed her Norse Lady.

== Collisions ==
=== With Palembang, January 1942 ===
On 8 January 1942 Norefjord was part of Convoy HX 169 from Nova Scotia en route to Great Britain when she collided with the Dutch ship Palembang. Both ships were damaged and returned to port for repairs. Norefjord returned to service by sailing with Convoy HX 175 on 13 February but again she returned to port. On 19 February Norefjord sailed with Convoy HX-176. This time she successfully completed the voyage, reaching Liverpool, England on 6 March 1942.

=== With Alcoa Rambler, August 1942 ===
On 16 August 1942 Norefjord reached Halifax, Nova Scotia with Convoy BX 33 from Boston, Massachusetts. Having arrived, Norefjord was in Bedford Basin when she collided with the US cargo ship Alcoa Rambler. Norefjord was damaged in the collision and subsequently beached.

Alcoa Rambler had been proceeding seawards, down the fairway, heading south-southeast. Rambler was laden with a cargo of explosives, was being escorted by a naval launch, and both Rambler and her escort were flying the warning flags required under local regulations. Norefjord had been crossing the fairway on an easterly course. It was daylight and the two ships sighted each other at a range of about 1,800 feet (550 m). The basin was congested with other ships, a number of changes of course were required, and Norefjord had repeatedly changed her course further to port before the two ships collided. The case between the owners of the two ships came to court in 1949 and its implications are now referred to in a guide to the International Regulations for Preventing Collisions at Sea.

== Stranded and shelled, August 1958 ==
Belang in North Sulawesi, Sulawesi, Indonesia, where Permesta rebels beached Norse Lady and the Indonesian Navy bombarded her

On 14 August 1958 Norse Lady was off Parigi, Central Sulawesi, Indonesia when she ran aground. On 16 August Permesta rebels captured her, refloated her and took her about 600 kilometres (320 nmi) east to Belang in the rebels' heartland in Minahasa, North Sulawesi. The rebels beached Norse Lady at Belang, but the Indonesian Navy sighted her there on 18 August, shelled her on 22 August and she was burnt out.

In March 1966 Hong Kong purchasers bought her wreck. They sold her to Taiwanese shipbreakers who towed Norse Lady to Kaohsiung, Taiwan and scrapped her.

== Sources and further reading ==
- Cockcroft, A.N.; Lameijer, J.N.F. (2012) [1965]. A Guide to the Collision Avoidance Rules (7th ed.). Kidlington; Waltham MA: Butterworth–Heinemann. p. 75. ISBN 978-0-08-097170-4.
- Kahin, Audrey R; Kahin, George McT (1997) [1995]. Subversion as Foreign Policy The Secret Eisenhower and Dulles Debacle in Indonesia. Seattle and London: University of Washington Press. ISBN 0-295-97618-7.
