= USS Ford County =

1944 LST-542-class tank landing ship

History

United States
- Name: USS LST-772
- Builder: Chicago Bridge & Iron Company, Seneca, Illinois
- Laid down: 3 August 1944
- Launched: 24 October 1944
- Commissioned: 13 November 1944
- Decommissioned: 3 July 1946
- Recommissioned: 3 November 1950
- Renamed: USS Ford County (LST-772), 1 July 1955
- Stricken: 19 March 1958
- Honours and awards: 1 battle star (World War II); 6 battle stars (Korea)
- Fate: Sunk as a target ship, 19 March 1958

General characteristics
- Class & type: LST-542-class tank landing ship
- Displacement: 1,625 long tons (1,651 t) light; 3,640 long tons (3,698 t) full
- Length: 328 ft (100 m)
- Beam: 50 ft (15 m)
- Draft: Unloaded : 2 ft 4 in (0.71 m) forward; 7 ft 6 in (2.29 m) aft; Loaded : 8 ft 2 in (2.49 m) forward; 14 ft 1 in (4.29 m) aft
- Propulsion: 2 × General Motors 12-567 diesel engines, two shafts, twin rudders
- Speed: 12 knots (22 km/h; 14 mph)
- Boats & landing craft carried: 2 LCVPs
- Troops: 130 officers and enlisted men
- Complement: 8–10 officers, 89–100 enlisted men
- Armament: 1 × single 3-inch/50-caliber gun mount; 8 × 40 mm guns; 12 × 20 mm guns

USS Ford County (LST-772) was an LST-542-class tank landing ship built for the United States Navy during World War II. Named after counties in Illinois and Kansas, she was the only U.S. Naval vessel to bear the name.

LST-772 was laid down on 3 August 1944 at Seneca, Illinois, by the Chicago Bridge & Iron Company; launched on 24 October 1944; sponsored by Mrs. Elsie Jane Woodlief Arrington; and commissioned on 13 November 1944.

== Service history ==
During World War II, LST-772 was assigned to the Asiatic-Pacific theater and participated in the assault and occupation of Okinawa Gunto from April through June 1945. Following the war, she performed occupation duty in the Far East until early December 1945. The ship was placed out of commission, in reserve, on 3 July 1946 and assigned to the Columbia River Group of the U.S. Pacific Reserve Fleet. Recommissioned on 3 November 1950, she saw extensive service during the Korean War. On 1 July 1955 she was redesignated USS Ford County (LST-772). Ford County was destroyed as a target ship on 19 March 1958 and struck from the Naval Vessel Register that same day.

LST-772 earned one battle star for World War II service and six for Korean War service.

== See also ==
- List of United States Navy LSTs
- Ford County, Illinois
- Ford County, Kansas
