= SS Aquila =

British built cargo ship sunk off Ambon

History
- Name: Aquila (1951–58); Duke of Sparta (1940–51)
- Namesake: eagle (bird) (1951–58); Duke of Sparta, Crown Prince of Greece (1940–51)
- Owner: Grimaldi Brothers, Italy (1951–58); Trent Maritime Co, Ltd. (1940–51)
- Operator: S. Livanos (1940–51)
- Port of registry: (Italy) Naples (1951–58); (United Kingdom) London (1940–51)
- Builder: Wm. Gray & Co, West Hartlepool, UK
- Yard number: 1104
- Launched: 9 July 1940
- Completed: October 1940
- Identification: UK official number 168027; call sign MLFN; (1940–51)
- Fate: Bombed by CIA aircraft 28 April or 2 May 1958; sank 27 May 1958

General characteristics
- Type: Cargo ship
- Tonnage: 5,397 GRT; 3,161 NRT
- Length: 441.1 ft (134.4 m)
- Beam: 57.8 ft (17.6 m)
- Draught: 25.4 ft (7.7 m)
- Installed power: 492 NHP
- Propulsion: 3-cylinder triple-expansion engine
- Sensors & processing systems: direction finding equipment; echo sounding device
- Notes: sister ship: Duke of Athens

SS Aquila (originally SS Duke of Sparta) was a cargo ship built in Britain in 1940 for Stavros Livanos' Trent Maritime Co Ltd. by William Gray & Company. An identical sister, Duke of Athens, was built for Trent at the same time.

In 1947–48 Duke of Sparta was involved in controversy over alleged treatment of Nigerian stowaways. She was sold to Grimaldi Brothers of Naples, Italy, in 1951, who renamed her Aquila.

She was in the Moluccas in eastern Indonesia in April 1958 when a CIA aircraft involved in a covert mission against the Sukarno government bombed and damaged her. She sank a month later. Her wreck off Ambon City is now a popular scuba diving site.

== Building ==
William Gray & Company built Duke of Sparta in their yard at West Hartlepool on Tees-side. They launched Duke of Sparta in July 1940 and completed her that October.

The ship had nine corrugated furnaces with a combined grate area of 145 square feet (13 m^{2}) that heating three single-ended boilers with a combined heating surface of 7,020 square feet (652 m^{2}). These fed steam at 225 lb_{f}/in^{2} to a three-cylinder triple-expansion steam engine that developed 492 nominal horsepower. The engine was built by the Central Marine Engineering Works, which was part of Wm Gray & Co.

The ship's navigation equipment included direction finding apparatus and an echo sounding device

== Stowaways from Nigeria ==
On 24 or 25 December 1947 Duke of Sparta sailed from Apapa on a voyage via Las Palmas to Kingston upon Hull, England. Before she sailed, five stowaways were found aboard and were handed over to the police. After two days' sailing, when she was off the Gold Coast, two more stowaways were found. Duke of Sparta summoned the assistance of fishing canoes in the vicinity, and the stowaways were transferred to the canoes to be put ashore. Some days later Duke of Sparta called at Las Palmas in the Canary Islands. Some days after she left Las Palmas a further five stowaways were found aboard, and these were kept aboard until Duke of Sparta docked at Hull.

Early in 1948 a controversy was raised in Nigeria over the treatment of some of Duke of Sparta's stowaways. A Mr Eusebius Tunde George of Lagos, Nigeria alleged that six stowaways were found aboard off Gold Coast, that the crew threw them all into the sea, and that only he and one other stowaway survived. Mr George's allegations were widely published in Nigerian newspapers on 13 February 1948 and subsequently repeated in the newspapers of other British colonies.

On 28 April 1948 the British Communist MP Willie Gallacher raised Mr George's allegations in the UK House of Commons. The Labour Government's Under-Secretary of State for Foreign Affairs, Christopher Mayhew MP, replied refuting the allegations in detail. Mayhew's Labour colleague Will Nally MP added that on 17 February the Nigerian Review had published an article headlined "Fantastic story about stowaways is proved false", that also had refuted Mr George's claims.

== Bombing ==
At the end of April 1958 Aquila was in ballast and anchored off Ambon City in Indonesia when she was attacked by a black, unmarked Douglas B-26 Invader ostensibly operated by right-wing Permesta rebels. The date is uncertain, either 28 April (according to one source) or 1 or 2 May (according to another). Damaged by a bomb blast, she stayed afloat for a month before sinking on 27 May 1958.

In fact, the attack was part of a U.S. CIA covert operation in support of Permesta in North Sulawesi intended to destabilise President Sukarno's Guided Democracy in Indonesia administration. The CIA pilots had orders to target foreign merchant ships in order to drive international trade away from Indonesian waters, thereby weakening the nation's economy in the belief this would topple the government.

The B-26 was flown by former USAF pilot and CIA contractor Allen Pope, who in the same sortie also bombed the Greek merchant ship SS Armonia and the Panamanian SS Flying Lark. On 18 May the Indonesian Navy and Air Force shot down Pope's aircraft and captured him, after which the US scaled back the CIA operation and in time revised its policy towards Indonesia.

== Wreck ==
Ambon, Indonesia, the position of the wreck identified as Aquila

For many years the position of Aquila's wreck was unknown. One source published in 1999 asserted that Pope had sunk her off the port of Donggala, near Palu in Central Sulawesi. This now seems to be incorrect.

For some years recreational scuba divers knew the wreck of a cargo ship in Ambon Bay without knowing her name. In October 2009 divers penetrated the mystery wreck's engine room and recovered a maker's plate from one of her water heaters. This gave the maker as a company in West Hartlepool where SS Aquila had been built, which at last gave a clue to the wreck's identity. Aquila is on a slope on the seabed off Ambon, with her stern about 15 metres (8 fathoms) below the surface and her bow about 35 metres (19 fathoms) below the surface.

== Sources ==
- Conboy, Kenneth; Morrison, James (1999). Feet to the Fire CIA Covert Operations in Indonesia, 1957–1958. Annapolis: Naval Institute Press. ISBN 1-55750-193-9.
- Kahin, Audrey R; Kahin, George McT (1997) [1995]. Subversion as Foreign Policy The Secret Eisenhower and Dulles Debacle in Indonesia. Seattle and London: University of Washington Press. ISBN 0-295-97618-7.
