= USS Chittenden County =

American tank landing ship

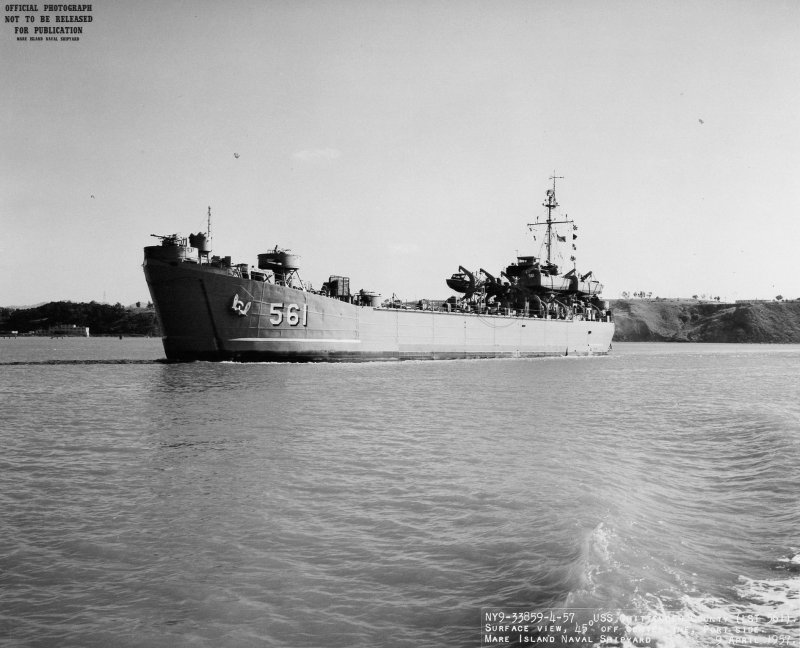
- Forward port quarter view of USS Chittenden County (LST-561) in the Mare Island channel, 9 April 1957. Chittenden County was under repair at Mare Island from 31 January to 9 April

History

United States
- Name: USS LST-561, later USS Chittenden County
- Namesake: Chittenden County, Vermont
- Builder: Missouri Valley Bridge and Iron Company, Evansville, Indiana
- Laid down: 24 February 1944
- Launched: 25 April 1944
- Sponsored by: Miss Marie Meier
- Commissioned: 15 May 1944
- Decommissioned: 30 April 1946
- Recommissioned: 18 September 1950
- Decommissioned: 2 June 1958
- Renamed: USS Chittenden County (LST-561), 1 July 1955
- Stricken: 27 June 1958
- Honours and awards: 1 battle star for World War II; 2 battle stars for the Korean War
- Fate: Sunk as a target, 21 October 1958

General characteristics
- Class & type: LST-542-class tank landing ship
- Displacement: 1,625 long tons (1,651 t) light; 4,080 long tons (4,145 t) full
- Length: 328 ft (100 m)
- Beam: 50 ft (15 m)
- Draft: Unloaded : 2 ft 4 in (0.71 m) forward; 7 ft 6 in (2.29 m) aft; Loaded : 8 ft 2 in (2.49 m) forward; 14 ft 1 in (4.29 m) aft
- Propulsion: 2 × General Motors 12-567 diesel engines, two shafts, twin rudders
- Speed: 12 knots (22 km/h; 14 mph)
- Boats & landing craft carried: 3 × LCVPs; 1 × LCPL
- Troops: 16 officers, 147 enlisted men
- Complement: 7 officers, 104 enlisted men
- Armament: 2 × twin 40 mm gun mounts w/Mk.51 directors; 4 × single 40 mm gun mounts; 12 × single 20 mm gun mounts

USS Chittenden County (LST-561), originally USS LST-561, was an LST-542-class tank landing ship built for the United States Navy during World War II. Later named for Chittenden County, Vermont, she was the only U.S. Naval vessel to bear the name.

LST-561 was laid down on 24 February 1944 at Evansville, Indiana by the Missouri Valley Bridge and Iron Company; launched on 25 April 1944. sponsored by Miss Marie Meier; and commissioned on 15 May 1944.

== Service history ==
During World War II, LST-561 was assigned to the European Theater and participated in the invasion of southern France in August and September 1944. She was decommissioned on 30 April 1946.

Due to the outbreak of the Korean War, the ship was recommissioned on 18 September 1950 and assigned to Commander, Amphibious Force, U.S. Pacific Fleet. She participated in the United Nations effort in Korea and performed services in the Far East, the Arctic, and off the United States West Coast. On 1 July 1955 she was redesignated USS Chittenden County (LST-561). The tank landing ship was decommissioned again on 2 June 1958.

Struck from the Naval Vessel Register on 27 June 1958, Chittenden County was sunk as a target south of Oahu, Hawaii on 21 October 1958.

LST-561 earned one battle star for World War II service and two for Korean War service.

== See also ==
- List of United States Navy LSTs
