= 1958 East River collision =

Collision between two ships and the subsequent fire and gasoline spill

Coordinates: 40.7077°N 73.9901°W

The 1958 East River collision occurred on the morning of June 25, 1958, two ships collided in the East River in New York City, resulting in a fire, a gasoline spill, and the deaths of two crewmembers.

== Incident ==
The vessels involved in the incident were the Nebraska, a 431 feet (131 m) cargo ship owned by Swedish company Rederi A/B Transatlantic, and the Empress Bay, a 197 feet (60 m) tanker owned by New York–based Petroleum Tankers Corporation. At the time of the collision, Nebraska was bound south from New Haven, Connecticut, to Newark, New Jersey, with a cargo of automobiles and Empress Bay was outbound from Bayonne, New Jersey, to Mount Vernon, New York, with 280,000 US gallons (1,100,000 L) of gasoline.

At 00:22 local time, Nebraska rammed Empress Bay amidships, triggering an explosion of gasoline aboard the tanker and spilling oil that ignited on the surface of the river. The ships collided almost directly under the Manhattan Bridge, and flames reached about 150 feet (46 m) upwards to scorch the bridge's deck and damage subway tracks. Two tugboats, eight New York Fire Department fireboats, and eleven Coast Guard patrol boats responded to the collision, and the fire was controlled by about 01:15. The spread of the gasoline slick led the Coast Guard to close the river in the area until the middle of the day, and smoking was banned on the waterfront until that evening.

Forty-three people were on board Nebraska and eight on Empress Bay and 37 sailors were injured, and two Empress Bay crewmembers, engineer Thomas Erickson and cook Otto Ahrens, were killed. William Finn, a New York Journal-American photographer, died of a heart attack as he was taking pictures of the disaster.

Nebraska remained afloat after the collision and was sailed to a Hudson River pier, while Empress Bay was partially submerged and later sank during the early morning of June 26. She was subsequently abandoned by her owners, leaving her the responsibility of the Army Corps of Engineers. The Corp requested bids from private firms to salvage her, and she was eventually refloated on September 9.
