= USS LST-794 =

US Navy World War II tank landing ship

History

United States
- Name: USS LST-794
- Builder: Dravo Corporation, Pittsburgh, Pennsylvania
- Laid down: 12 July 1944
- Launched: 16 September 1944
- Commissioned: 20 May 1944
- Decommissioned: 9 July 1946
- Renamed: USS Gibson County (LST-794), 1 July 1955
- Stricken: 1 November 1958
- Honors and awards: 1 battle star (World War II)
- Fate: Sunk as a target ship, 22 May 1958

General characteristics
- Class & type: LST-542-class tank landing ship
- Displacement: 1,625 long tons (1,651 t) light; 4,080 long tons (4,145 t) full
- Length: 328 ft (100 m)
- Beam: 50 ft (15 m)
- Draft: Unloaded : 2 ft 4 in (0.71 m) forward; 7 ft 6 in (2.29 m) aft; Loaded : 8 ft 2 in (2.49 m) forward; 14 ft 1 in (4.29 m) aft
- Propulsion: 2 × General Motors 12-567 diesel engines, two shafts, twin rudders
- Speed: 12 knots (22 km/h; 14 mph)
- Boats & landing craft carried: 2 LCVPs
- Troops: 16 officers, 147 enlisted men
- Complement: 7 officers, 104 enlisted men
- Armament: 8 × 40 mm guns; 12 × 20 mm guns

USS LST-794 was an LST-542-class tank landing ship built for the United States Navy during World War II. Late in her career, she was renamed Gibson County (LST-794)—for counties in Indiana and Tennessee, the only U.S. Naval vessel to bear the name—but saw no active service under that name.

Originally laid down as LST-794 by the Dravo Corporation, Pittsburgh, Pennsylvania on 12 July 1944; launched 16 September 1944; sponsored by Mrs. B. H. Gommel; and commissioned 16 October 1944.

== Service history ==
Following shakedown, LST-794 departed New Orleans 15 November, en route to the Pacific. After embarking Army and Navy passengers at Pearl Harbor, she steamed to the New Hebrides, arriving Espiritu Santo on 16 January 1945. Proceeding to the Russell Islands she debarked passengers and cargo before sailing to Guadalcanal for assignment. During the next four weeks she transported troops and cargo between Guadalcanal and the Russell Islands. As the invasion of Okinawa approached, LST-794 engaged in intensive amphibious exercises in the Solomons, then steamed for the Ulithi staging area. After embarking men and vehicles of the 1st Battalion 4th Marines, the landing ship departed Ulithi on 25 March, and a week later arrived off Okinawa. On 1 April the troops stormed ashore in small boats and LVTs as the Marines established a beachhead. She remained in the assault area until 11 April when she sailed to Saipan for reinforcements.

For the rest of the war, LST-794 transported troops and cargo between Okinawa and the Philippines. Following the surrender of Japan, she remained in the Far East, assisting the occupation forces in Japan, Korea, and Okinawa. Returning to the United States in early 1946, LST-794 decommissioned on 9 July 1946 and joined the Pacific Reserve Fleet, berthed in the Columbia River. Named USS Gibson County (LST-794) on 1 July 1955, she was used as a target and sunk by the submarine Rasher on 22 May 1958. The ship was struck from the Naval Vessel Register on 1 November 1958.

LST-794 received one battle star for World War II service.
