= USS Kent County =

US Navy tank landing ship

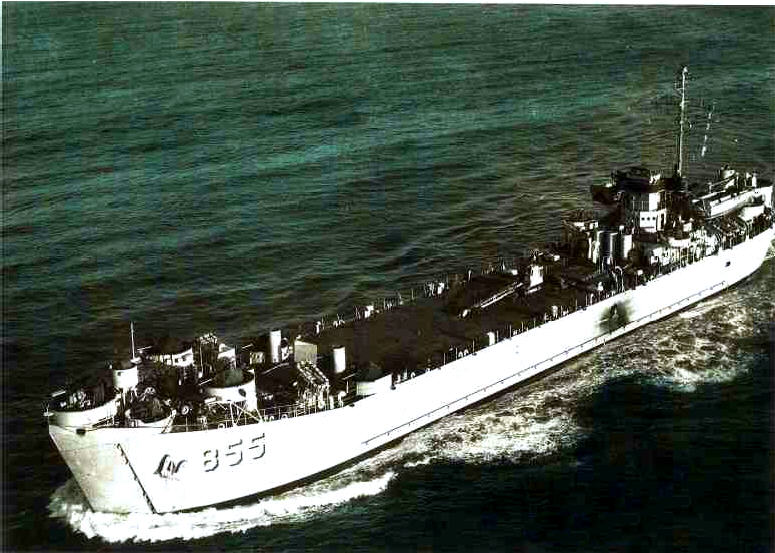
- LST-855 underway, date and place unknown

History

United States
- Name: USS LST-855
- Builder: Chicago Bridge & Iron Company, Seneca, Illinois
- Laid down: 6 September 1944
- Launched: 27 November 1944
- Commissioned: 21 December 1944
- Decommissioned: 15 February 1950
- Recommissioned: 3 November 1950
- Decommissioned: 22 January 1958
- Renamed: USS Kent County (LST-855), 1 July 1955
- Honors and awards: 6 battle stars (Korea)
- Fate: Sunk as a target, 19 March 1958

General characteristics
- Class & type: LST-542-class tank landing ship
- Displacement: 1,625 long tons (1,651 t) light; 3,640 long tons (3,698 t) full
- Length: 328 ft (100 m)
- Beam: 50 ft (15 m)
- Draft: Unloaded : 2 ft 4 in (0.71 m) forward; 7 ft 6 in (2.29 m) aft; Loaded : 8 ft 2 in (2.49 m) forward; 14 ft 1 in (4.29 m) aft
- Propulsion: 2 × General Motors 12-567 diesel engines, two shafts, twin rudders
- Speed: 12 knots (22 km/h; 14 mph)
- Boats & landing craft carried: 2 × LCVPs
- Troops: Approximately 130 officers and enlisted men
- Complement: 8–10 officers, 89–100 enlisted men
- Armament: 8 × 40 mm guns; 12 × 20 mm guns

USS Kent County (LST-855) was an LST-542-class tank landing ship built for the United States Navy during World War II. Named after counties in Delaware, Maryland, Michigan, Rhode Island, and Texas, she was the only U.S. Naval vessel to bear the name.

Originally laid down as USS LST-855 by the Chicago Bridge & Iron Company of Seneca, Illinois on 6 September 1944; launched on 27 November, sponsored by Mrs. Jean Henning Hoerner; and commissioned on 21 December.

== Service history ==
=== World War II, 1945 ===
After shakedown off Florida, LST-855 left New Orleans on 31 December 1944. She Entered the Pacific Ocean through the Panama Canal en route to San Diego, California. In January 1945, she left San Diego en route to Pearl Harbor, Hawaii. In February 1945, she left Pearl and docked in the Marshall Islands, specifically at Kwajalein and Enewetak. In April 1945, she left the Marshall Islands en route to Mariana Islands; Guam, Si-pan, and Tinian. In July 1945, she left the Mariana Islands, and arrived in Okinawa. During the remaining months of World War II, she shuttled supplies and equipment among the Marianas, Philippines, and Okinawa staging areas for a possible invasion of Japan. In late August, she left Okinawa and arrived in Japan. On 30 August 1945, she left Japan and arrived in Leyte Gulf, in the Philippines on 2 September 1945. On 10 September 1945, she left the Philippines and returned to Yokohama, Japan on 29 September 1945. In early October 1945, she left Japan and returned to Guam in mid October 1945. In late October, she departed Guam for Pearl Harbor, Hawaii and arrived in early November. Three weeks later, she left Pearl, and arrived to San Francisco, California on 10 December 1945. At some point during her visits to Okinawa to deliver supplies she was attacked by a kamikaze fighter. According to Lt. Deitenbeck her cargo was cement which was in bags, in layers on the deck of the ship. According to Lt. Deitenbeck the Kamikaze caused no damage or casualties due to the cement bags on the deck.

=== 1945–1950 ===
The enemy's acceptance of Allied peace terms precluded an invasion; and the landing ship then operated between the Philippines and Japan, transporting occupation forces until mid-November. On 20 November LST-855 departed Guam with over 300 U.S.-bound Pacific veterans on board, arriving San Francisco the following month.

Returning to the Far East seven months later, she arrived Taku, China on 16 July 1946 to support U.S. forces in the area. She made cargo runs among Chinese ports, and served in this capacity until 1949. After the Communist takeover of mainland China, LST-855 returned to the United States, arriving San Diego on 29 July 1949. Operating along the West Coast, the veteran landing ship sailed to Alaska in early September for cargo operations in the North Pacific. She returned Seattle on 15 November and decommissioned at Bremerton on 15 February 1950.

=== Korea, 1950–1953 ===
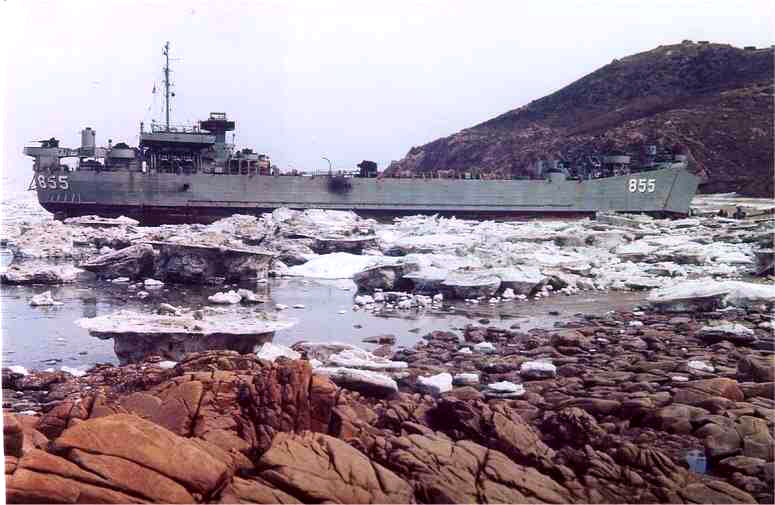
LST-855 iced in at Cho-Do, Korea in February 1953.

After the outbreak of the Korean War, to aid in the movement of men and equipment, LST-855 was recommissioned on 3 November . After training off the West Coast, she departed Long Beach on 26 March 1951 for duty in the Western Pacific. Arriving Pusan, Korea on 23 May she unloaded cargo for the war effort, then sailed for Yokohama, Japan. For the next four months she continued cargo operations out of Japan, before making another cargo run to Korea in mid-October. Two months later she embarked North Korean refugees at Paengyang Do and transferred them to Makpo; and in late December she transported troops and vehicles of the 27th Infantry Regiment combat team from Inchon to Koje Do. LST-855 departed Yokosuka, Japan, on 25 February 1952 for a stateside overhaul.

She was back in the Far East on 2 November and resumed cargo operations out of Japan and Korea. For the remainder of the Korean War, she shuttled between Korean and Japanese ports as a logistic support ship. Following the July 1953 armistice which ended the fighting, LST-855 continued cargo runs, operated as a station ship, and transported prisoners of war for repatriation. Returning San Diego on 25 September, she operated off the West Coast for the rest of 1953.

=== 1954–1958 ===
The landing ship sailed for another Far East tour on 28 May 1954 arriving Yokosuka a month later. While operating with 7th Fleet units from August to October, she participated in "Operation Passage to Freedom." She carried refugees, troops and supplies from North Vietnam and transported them to the South. LST-855 continued operating in the Far East; and on 6 February 1955 she was en route to the Tachen Islands to evacuate Nationalist Chinese troops to Formosa when their positions could no longer be defended. Loading 300 troops and vehicles, she departed Tachen Islands on 10 February; and, after off-loading at Keelung, Formosa she resumed duties out of Japan. Returning San Diego on 20 April LST-855 performed amphibious exercises off the West Coast for the remainder of the year. She was named USS Kent County (LST-855) on 1 July 1955. Kent County made her final WestPac cruise in August 1956 engaging in amphibious exercises with 7th Fleet units, then returning to the United States on 14 May 1957 to conduct amphibious exercises off the West Coast and Hawaii.

=== Decommissioning and disposal ===
Kent County was decommissioned on 22 January 1958, used as a target ship, and destroyed on 19 March 1958.

== Awards ==
LST-855 received six battle stars for the Korean War.
