= SS Flying Lark =

Banana boat built in 1915 and named SS Ionion 1955–57

History
- Name: SS Honduras (1915–34); SS Tuxpam (1934–39); SS Denny (1939); SS Trakai (1939–46); SS Phoenix (1946–48); SS Ville de Genève (1948–55); SS Ionion (1955–57); SS Flying Lark (1957–58)
- Owner: Dampskibsselskab Globe (1915–18); C.H.F. Jensen (1918–34); Weinberger Banana Co (1934–38); Weinberger Steam Ship Co (1938–39); Leituvos Baltijos Lloydas (1939–42); US Maritime Commission (1942–46); Cia. de Nav. Insular (1946–48); SM Auxiliare de Transports (1948–55); D.S. Zampazas (1955–57); Chiap Huah Shipping Co (1957–58)
- Operator: P. Johannessen, Tønsberg (1915–20); S. Dreyer (1920–34); Agwilines Inc (1942–43); United Fruit Co (1943–44); Lykes Bros SS Co (1944–45); United Fruit Co (1945); Hadjilias Interests (1946–48)
- Port of registry: (Norway) Kristiania (1915–25); (Norway) Oslo (1925–34); (Nicaragua) Bluefields (1934–39); (Lithuania) ? (1939–42); (Panama) (1942–46); (Greece) (1946–48); (France) Rouen (1948–55); (Greece) (1955–57); (Panama) (1957–58)
- Builder: Fredrikstad Mekaniske Verksted, Fredrikstad, Norway
- Yard number: 195
- Launched: 1915
- Out of service: 30 April 1958
- Identification: Code Letters MLRD; (1915–33); HPVV; (1939–46)
- Fate: Bombed by CIA aircraft 28 April and 30 April 1958; sank 30 April

General characteristics
- Type: banana boat
- Tonnage: 1,255 GRT; 704 NRT; 1,086 tonnage under deck; 1,750 DWT
- Length: 235.0 ft (71.6 m)
- Beam: 33.6 ft (10.2 m)
- Draught: 19.9 ft (6.1 m)
- Installed power: 188 NHP
- Propulsion: 1 Fredrikstad Mekaniske Verksted 3-cylinder triple-expansion steam engine
- Speed: 12.5 knots (23.2 km/h; 14.4 mph)

SS Flying Lark was a ship built in Fredrikstad, Norway in 1915 as the banana boat SS Honduras. Over a 43 year career that spanned oceans and seas the world over she had 10 owners, eight names and a succession of different managers.

She is best known today as the Flying Lark, given to her by her final owners in 1957. That is the name she bore in the Moluccas in eastern Indonesia in April 1958 when a CIA aircraft involved in a covert mission against the Sukarno government attacked and sank her, killing at least nine of her crew.

== Construction ==
Fredrikstad Mekaniske Verksted of Fredrikstad, Norway built the ship as the banana boat SS Honduras. She had two fire tube boilers with a combined heating surface of 3,943 square feet (366 m^{2}) that supplied steam at 180 lb_{f}/in^{2} to a three-cylinder triple-expansion steam engine. There is some discrepancy over her nominal horsepower: a Norwegian source claims that her engine produced 258 NHP but Lloyd's Register records it as 188 NHP.

== Service history ==
Honduras was built for Peder Johannesen's Dampskibsselskab Globe ("Globe Steamship Co") of Tønsberg, which registered her in Kristiania, Norway. In 1918 P. Johannesen sold Honduras to C.H.F. Jensen, and in 1920 her management was transferred to S. Dreyer. Both Jensen and Dreyer were based in Kristiania, which from 1925 was renamed Oslo.

In 1934 Honduras was sold to Weinberger Banana Co, who renamed her Tuxpam and registered her in Bluefields, Nicaragua. In 1938 she was transferred to Weinberger Steam Ship Co, and in 1939 she was renamed Denny. In the same year she was sold to Akc. Bve. Leituvos Baltijos Lloydas ("Lithuanian Baltic Lloyd") of Šventoji, Lithuania, who renamed her Trakai. In June 1942 the United States Maritime Commission took her over, registered her in Panama City, and placed her in the management of Agwilines Inc of Panama. Management was transferred to the United Fruit Company in September 1943, then to Lykes Brothers Steamship Company in October 1944, and back to United Fruit Co in July 1945. In October 1945 Trakai was laid up.

In 1946 Trakai was sold to Hadjilias Interests' Compañía de Navegación Insular S.A. of Panama, who registered her in Greece and renamed her Phoenix. In 1948 she was sold to Société Maritime Auxiliare de Transports of Basel, Switzerland, who renamed her Ville de Genève and registered her in Rouen, France. In 1955 she was sold to D.S. Zampazas and others of Beirut, Lebanon, who registered her in Greece and renamed her Ionion.

By the late 1950s the vessel was trading as a general cargo ship rather than a banana boat. In 1957 she was sold to Chiap Huah Shipping Co of Panama (the shipping subsidiary of Chiap Huah Manufactory of Hong Kong), who renamed her Flying Lark and registered her in Panama.

== Sinking ==
At the end of April 1958 Flying Lark was in Amboina Harbour in Indonesia loading a cargo of copra. On 28 April a Douglas B-26 Invader bomber aircraft, operated by the CIA and painted black and with no markings, bombed and damaged her. The attack killed nine of the crew and another six were reported missing. The damaged Flying Lark stayed afloat for at least two days, but sank on or after 30 April.

In the same attack, the same aircraft hit and sank the merchant ships SS Aquila and SS Armonia. One source asserts that all three ships were off the port of Donggala near Palu in Central Sulawesi (at least 500 miles (800 km) west of Ambon) when they were hit. This now appears doubtful, as Aquila's wreck seems to have been identified in Ambon Bay. Another source states that Flying Lark was attacked on 1 or 2 May. This may result partly from confusion between the date she was bombed and the date she sank.

The attack was part of a CIA covert operation to support right-wing Permesta rebels in North Sulawesi to destabilise President Sukarno's government of Indonesia. The CIA pilots had orders to target foreign merchant ships to drive foreign trade away from Indonesian waters, thereby weakening the Indonesian economy in the belief that this would undermine Sukarno.

The pilot was the CIA and former USAF pilot Allen Pope. On 18 May the Indonesian Navy and Air Force shot down Pope's aircraft and captured him, after which the USA rapidly aborted the CIA mission and reversed its policy towards Indonesia.

Amboina in Indonesia, where a CIA aircraft bombed Flying Lark.

== Sources ==
- Conboy, Kenneth; Morrison, James (1999). Feet to the Fire CIA Covert Operations in Indonesia, 1957–1958. Annapolis: Naval Institute Press. ISBN 1-55750-193-9.
- Kahin, Audrey R; Kahin, George McT (1997) [1995]. Subversion as Foreign Policy The Secret Eisenhower and Dulles Debacle in Indonesia. Seattle and London: University of Washington Press. ISBN 0-295-97618-7.
