= SS Armonia =

British cargo ship

History
- Name: Tullochmoor (1924–36); Brigitte (1936–45); Empire Soar (1945–46); Preveza (1946–48); Danapris (1948–57); Armonia (1957–59); Keanyew (1959–60); Charlie (1960)
- Namesake: Tulloch Moor, Strathspey, Scotland (1924–36); River Soar, England (1945–46); Preveza, Greece (1946–48); Δαναπρης ("Danapris"), the Greek name for the Dniepr River; ἁρμονία ("harmonia"), Greek for a "joint", "covenant", "decree", "concord", "agreement" or "harmony" (musical or otherwise)
- Owner: Moor Line Ltd (1924–36); Franz L Nimitz (1936–45); MoWT (1945–46); Government of Greece (1946–48); Synodinos Bros (1948–57); A. Angelicoussis & Co (1957–59); Keanyew Shipping Co (1959–60); Southern Commercial Co (1960)
- Operator: W Runciman & Co Ltd (1924–36); Sir R Ropner & Co (1945–46)
- Port of registry: (United Kingdom) Newcastle (1924–36); (Nazi Germany) Stettin (1936–45); (United Kingdom) London (1945–46); (Greece) (1946–59); (Panama) (1959–60)
- Builder: Blyth Shipbuilding & Drydock Co Ltd, Blyth, Northumberland, UK
- Launched: 3 July 1924
- Completed: October 1924
- Identification: Code Letters KRJS; (1930–34); Code Letters GJSD; (1934–36); Code Letters GLWW; (1945–46)
- Fate: Scrapped

General characteristics
- Type: Cargo ship
- Tonnage: 2,729 GRT; 1,686 NRT
- Length: 320.2 ft (97.6 m)
- Beam: 42.9 ft (13.1 m)
- Draught: 24.3 ft (7.4 m)
- Installed power: 323 NHP
- Propulsion: screw, powered by 1 North Eastern Marine Eng. Co. 3-cylinder triple-expansion steam engine supplied by 2 boilers at a pressure of 180 PSI

SS Armonia was a 2,740 GRT cargo ship built in Britain in 1924 for the Moor Line as SS Tullochmoor. Scrapped in 1960, she had eight sets of owners, managers and names over her 26-year career.

She is known today by her sixth name, Armonia, which she bore in April 1958 when a CIA aircraft involved in a covert mission against the Sukarno government bombed and damaged her in the Molucca Islands in eastern Indonesia.

== Service history ==
The ship was launched by Blyth Shipbuilding & Drydock Co Ltd as Tullochmoor at Blyth, Northumberland and completed in October 1924. She was owned by Moor Line and managed by Walter Runciman and Company. In 1936 she was sold to Franz L Nimitz of Stettin, Germany, who renamed her Brigitte. In May 1945 she was at Hamburg where she was seized as an Allied war prize. The UK Ministry of War Transport (MoWT) took her over, named her Empire Soar and placed her under the management of Sir Robert Ropner & Co. In 1946 she was sold to the Greek government, which renamed her Preveza. In 1948 she was sold to Synodinos Brothers of Greece who renamed her Danapris. In 1957 she was sold to A. Angelicoussis & Co of Greece who renamed her Armonia. In 1959 she was sold to Keanyew Shipping Co who renamed her Keanyew and registered her in Panama. In 1960 she was sold to Southern Commercial Co who renamed her Charlie. Later in 1960 she was scrapped in Hong Kong.

== Bombing ==
Ambon, Indonesia, where a CIA aircraft attacked Armonia in 1958

At the end of April or beginning of May 1958 Armonia was in Amboina Harbour in Indonesia. On 28 April a Douglas B-26 Invader bomber aircraft, operated by the CIA and painted black and with no markings, bombed her. In the same attack, the same aircraft hit and sank the merchant ships SS Aquila and SS Flying Lark. One source asserts that all three ships were off the port of Donggala near Palu in Central Sulawesi (at least 500 miles (800 km) west of Ambon) when they were hit. This now appears doubtful, as Aquila's wreck seems to have been identified in Ambon Bay. There is also some discrepancy over the date of the attack: one source states that the three ships were bombed on 28 April; another states that Armonia was attacked on 1 or 2 May.

== Sources ==
- Conboy, Kenneth; Morrison, James (1999). Feet to the Fire CIA Covert Operations in Indonesia, 1957–1958. Annapolis: Naval Institute Press. ISBN 1-55750-193-9.
- Kahin, Audrey R; Kahin, George McT (1997) [1995]. Subversion as Foreign Policy The Secret Eisenhower and Dulles Debacle in Indonesia. Seattle and London: University of Washington Press. ISBN 0-295-97618-7.
- Liddell, Henry; Scott, Robert; Stuart-Jones, Henry; McKenzie, Roderick, eds. (1929) [1871]. A Lexicon Abridged from Liddell and Scott's Greek-English Lexicon. Oxford, London etc.: The Clarendon Press. p. 103.
