= Commander of Army Strategic Reserve Command =

- Panglima Komando Cadangan Strategis Angkatan Darat

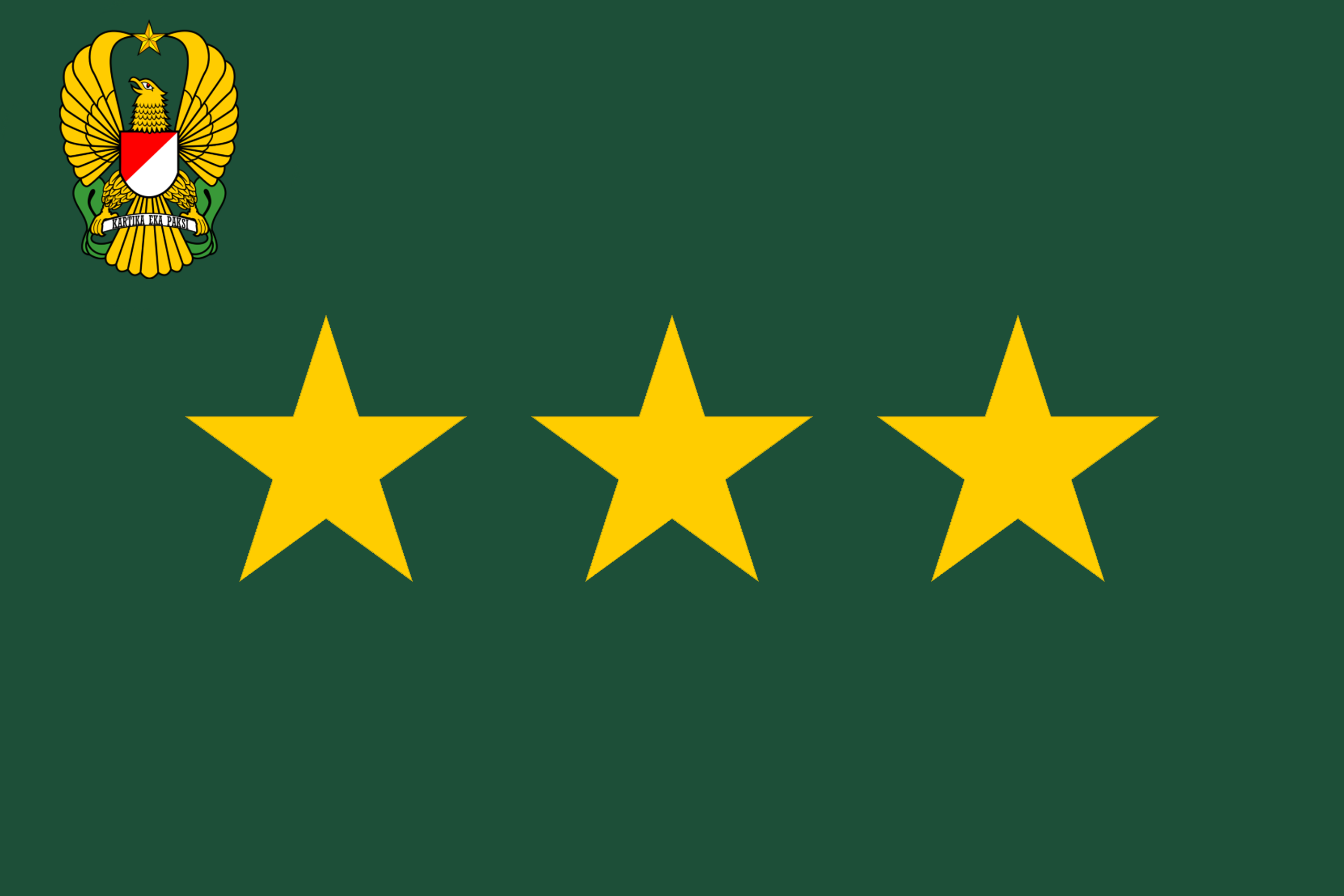
- Flag of the Commander of Kostrad

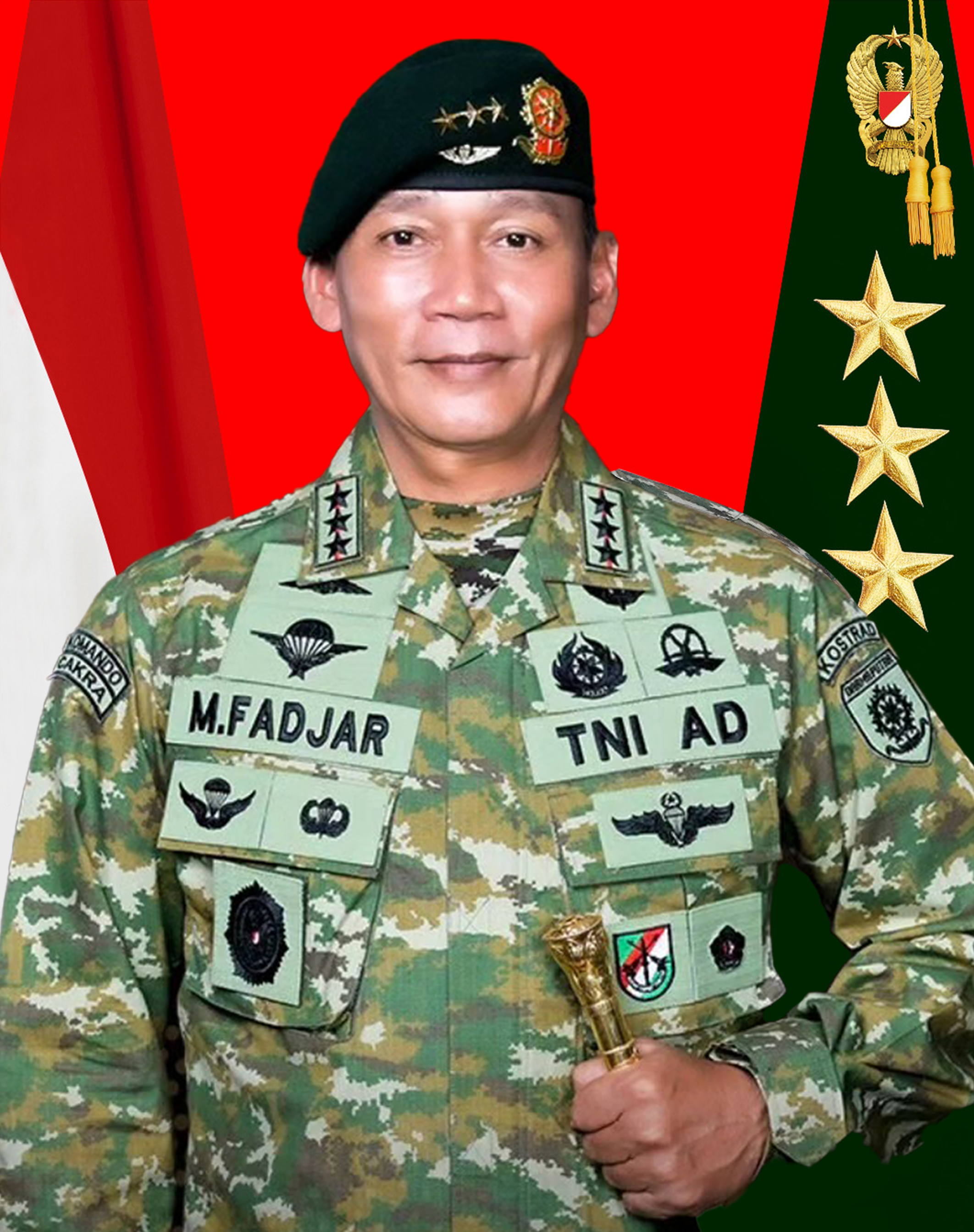
- Incumbent; Lieutenant General Mohammad Fadjar since 30 December 2024
- Army Strategic Reserve Command
- Reports to: Chief of Staff of the Indonesian Army
- Formation: 6 March 1961
- First holder: Maj. Gen. Soeharto

The Commander of Army Strategic Reserve Command (Indonesian: Panglima Komando Cadangan Strategis Angkatan Darat; abbreviated as Pangkostrad) is the highest position of Army Strategic Reserve Command or Kostrad. Kostrad falls under the army chief of staff for training, personnel, and administration.

The position of Commander of the Army Strategic Reserve Command is considered a stepping stone to high-level government positions in Indonesia. Many of its commanders have gone on to become prominent national leaders. For instance, Suharto and Prabowo Subianto, both rose to become President; while Umar Wirahadikusumah became Vice-President; Rudini, served as Minister of Home Affairs; Ryamizard Ryacudu, advanced to become Chief of Staff of the Army and Minister of Defence; and numerous commanders have subsequently held the roles of Chief of Staff of the Army and Commander of the Indonesian National Armed Forces.

== List of Commander of Army Strategic Command ==
| No | Portrait | Name | From | To |
| | Army General Reserve Corps | | | |
|---|---|---|---|---|
| 1 | | Major General Soeharto | 6 March 1961 | 15 August 1963 |
| 1 | Army Strategic Reserve Command | | | |
| 1 | | Major General Soeharto | 15 August 1963 | 2 December 1965 |
| 2 | | Major General Umar Wirahadikusumah | 2 December 1965 | 27 May 1967 |
| 3 | | Major General Kemal Idris | 27 May 1967 | 11 March 1969 |
| 4 | | Major General Wahono | 11 March 1969 | 20 February 1970 |
| 5 | | Major General Makmun Murod | 20 February 1970 | 26 December 1971 |
| 6 | | Major General Wahono | 26 December 1971 | 18 March 1973 |
| 7 | | Major General Poniman | 18 March 1973 | 4 May 1974 |
| 8 | | Major General Himawan Sutanto | 4 May 1974 | 4 January 1975 |
| 9 | | Major General Leo Lopulisa | 4 January 1975 | 19 January 1978 |
| 10 | | Major General Wiyogo Atmodarminto | 19 January 1978 | 1 March 1980 |
| 11 | | Major General Muhammad Ismail | 1 March 1980 | 24 January 1981 |
| 12 | | Major General Rudini | 24 January 1981 | 24 May 1983 |
| 13 | | Major General Suweno | 24 May 1983 | 30 January 1986 |
| 14 | | Major General Suripto | 30 January 1986 | 21 August 1987 |
| 15 | | Major General Adolf Sagala Rajagukguk | 21 August 1987 | 28 March 1988 |
| 16 | | Major General Sugito | 28 March 1988 | 9 August 1990 |
| 17 | | Major General Wismoyo Arismunandar | 9 August 1990 | 29 July 1992 |
| 18 | | Major General Kuntara | 29 July 1992 | 22 September 1994 |
| 19 | | Major General Tarub | 22 September 1994 | 4 April 1996 |
| 20 | | Lieutenant General Wiranto | 4 April 1996 | 20 June 1997 |
| 21 | | Lieutenant General Sugiono | 20 June 1997 | 20 March 1998 |
| 22 | | Lieutenant General Prabowo Subianto | 20 March 1998 | 22 May 1998 |
| * | | Lieutenant General Johny Lumintang | 22 May 1998 | 23 May 1998 |
| 23 | | Lieutenant General Djamari Chaniago | 23 May 1998 | 24 November 1999 |
| 24 | | Lieutenant General Djaja Suparman | 24 November 1999 | 29 March 2000 |
| 25 | | Lieutenant General Agus Wirahadikusumah | 29 March 2000 | 1 August 2000 |
| 26 | | Lieutenant General Ryamizard Ryacudu | 1 August 2000 | 3 July 2002 |
| 27 | | Lieutenant General Bibit Waluyo | 3 July 2002 | 3 November 2004 |
| 28 | | Lieutenant General Hadi Waluyo | 3 November 2004 | 2 May 2006 |
| 29 | | Lieutenant General Erwin Sujono | 2 May 2006 | 12 November 2007 |
| 30 | | Lieutenant General George Toisutta | 13 November 2007 | 17 February 2010 |
| 31 | | Lieutenant General Burhanuddin Amin | 17 February 2010 | 30 September 2010 |
| 32 | | Lieutenant General Pramono Edhie Wibowo | 30 September 2010 | 9 August 2011 |
| 33 | | Lieutenant General Azmyn Yusri Nasution | 9 August 2011 | 13 March 2012 |
| 34 | | Lieutenant General Muhammad Munir | 13 March 2012 | 2 June 2013 |
| 35 | | Lieutenant General Gatot Nurmantyo | 2 June 2013 | 26 September 2014 |
| 36 | | Lieutenant General Mulyono | 26 September 2014 | 15 July 2015 |
| 37 | | Lieutenant General Edy Rahmayadi | 25 July 2015 | 4 January 2018 |
| 38 | | Lieutenant General Agus Kriswanto | 4 January 2018 | 14 July 2018 |
| 39 | | Lieutenant General Andika Perkasa | 14 July 2018 | 29 November 2018 |
| 40 | | Lieutenant General Besar Harto Karyawan | 29 November 2018 | 27 July 2020 |
| 41 | | Lieutenant General Eko Margiyono | 27 July 2020 | 25 May 2021 |
| 42 | | Lieutenant General Dudung Abdurachman | 25 May 2021 | 31 January 2022 |
| 43 | | Lieutenant General Maruli Simanjuntak | 31 January 2022 | 29 November 2023 |
| 44 | | Lieutenant General Muhammad Saleh Mustafa | 29 November 2023 | 24 July 2024 |
| 45 | | Lieutenant General Mohamad Hasan | 24 July 2024 | 30 December 2024 |
| 46 | | Lieutenant General Mohammad Fadjar | 30 December 2024 | Present |

== See also ==
- Indonesian National Armed Forces
- Indonesian Army
