= Wirahadikusumah =

Wirahadikusumah is an Indonesian family whose members have been active in politics and the military in the 20th century. Prominent members of the family include:

- Umar Wirahadikusumah (1924–2003), Indonesian politician and army general
- Agus Wirahadikusumah (1951–2001), former Kostrad commander
