= Ryamizard Ryacudu =

Indonesian politician and military officer (1950–2026)

General (Ret.) Ryamizard Ryacudu
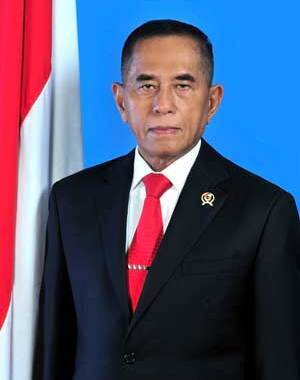
- Official portrait, 2014

25th Minister of Defense
- In office 27 October 2014 – 20 October 2019
- President: Joko Widodo
- Preceded by: Purnomo Yusgiantoro
- Succeeded by: Prabowo Subianto

23rd Chief of Staff of the Indonesian Army
- In office 4 June 2002 – 18 February 2005
- President: Megawati Sukarnoputri; Susilo Bambang Yudhoyono
- Preceded by: Endriartono Sutarto
- Succeeded by: Djoko Santoso

26th Commander of Army Strategic Reserve Command
- In office 1 August 2000 – 4 June 2002
- President: Abdurrahman Wahid; Megawati Sukarnoputri
- Preceded by: Agus Wirahadikusumah
- Succeeded by: Bibit Waluyo

Personal details
- Born: 21 April 1950 Palembang, Indonesia
- Died: 31 May 2026 (aged 76) Jakarta, Indonesia
- Resting place: Kalibata Heroes' Cemetery
- Spouse: Nora Tristyana
- Children: 3
- Education: Indonesian Military Academy

Military service
- Allegiance: Indonesia
- Branch/service: Indonesian Army
- Years of service: 1974–2005
- Rank: General
- Unit: Infantry
- Battles/wars: Operation Lotus; Insurgency in Aceh; Papua conflict

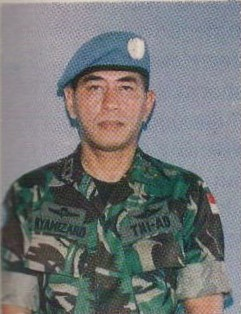
Ryamizard Ryacudu as the Commander of the Garuda Contingent in Cambodia, 1992

General (Ret.) Ryamizard Ryacudu id (21 April 1950 – 31 May 2026) was an Indonesian politician who served as the Minister of Defense of Indonesia from 2014 until 2019. He previously served as Chief of Staff of the Indonesian Army from 2002 to 2005, and was Commander of Army Strategic Command from 2000 to 2002.

== Early life and family ==
Ryamizard Ryacudu was born in Palembang on 21 April 1950 as the eldest child of Major General Musannif Ryacudu, a well known figure in Lampung and a general acquainted with Sukarno. His father is also a descendant of an Islamic preacher who spread Islam in Lampung. He was married to Nora Tristyana, daughter to former Vice President of Indonesia Try Sutrisno. His younger brother, Syamsura Ryacudu serves as Governor of Lampung between 2008 and 2009.

== Military career ==
Following the footsteps of his father, Ryamizard enrolled in the Indonesian Military Academy (Akabri) and graduated in 1974. He rose in the ranks as a platoon commander in Kodam XII/Tanjungpura on 15 November 1976, later promoted gradually to company commander, staff of battalion operations and battalion commander. He was first deployed in combat against North Kalimantan Communist Party between 1976 and 1982.

Ryacudu rose to prominence in his military career after becoming the commander of Kodam V/Brawijaya in 1999 and later Kodam Jayakarta. During the shakeup of the political elite during Gus Dur's presidency that led up to his impeachment, Ryamizard threatened to take action against whoever was trying to disturb the peace. Distinguished in his role as commander of Kodam Jayakarta, Ryamizard was promoted to lieutenant general and became the Commander of Army Strategic Reserve Command, taking over from Agus Wirahadikusumah.

As the Kostrad commander, he once led an alert call on 23 July 2001 during the Special Session of the People's Consultative Assembly (MPR), leading and coordinating soldiers from all three branches of the armed forces. Ryamizard clarified that the alert call was to prevent any violence resulting from political chaos such as the May 1998 riots. However, he stated that the TNI would remain neutral as the special session of the MPR was not their concern. His ability to coordinate together with the Indonesian Navy and Indonesian Air Force rewarded him with an appointment as Deputy Chief of Staff of the Army and later Chief of Staff of the Army replacing Endriartono Sutarto.

When he was Chief of Staff of the Indonesian Army, he was once surrounded by enemy forces. On 20 February 2005, he led a delegation to oversee a bridge reconstruction after the 2004 Indian Ocean earthquake and tsunami when he got ambushed by 20 rebel soldiers of the Free Aceh Movement (GAM). As both sides engaged, Ryamizard armed himself with a MP5 submachine gun and joined TNI soldiers in returning fire and pursuing GAM forces for 30 minutes. As GAM soldiers retreated to nearby swamps and hills, Ryamizard instructed the soldiers to be on guard. A former GAM soldier once remarked in the encounter that if given the chance, Ryamizard would have been hit as they were in close combat radius of 4 meters with the general, but they chose not to shoot him due to Ryamizard's contribution in rebuilding Aceh. When this occurred, Ryamizard was on his final days of his tenure as he was scheduled to hand over his position to Lieutenant General Djoko Santoso at the end of February.

He was nominated as Commander of the Indonesian National Armed Forces at the end of Megawati Sukarnoputri's tenure as president. However, during the transition of power to Susilo Bambang Yudhoyono, his nomination was annulled with Endriartono Sutarto's command extended. Eventually, he was skipped over in favor of Air Chief Marshal Djoko Suyanto due to his annulled nomination.

== Political career ==
Ryamizard was regarded as "Megawati's man". According to several retired officers, Ryamizard's appointment as Chief of Staff was due to being the same hometown as Taufiq Kiemas, Megawati's spouse. His nomination as Commander of the Indonesian National Armed Forces was nullified by Susilo Bambang Yudhoyono who chose to extend Endriartono Sutarto's tenure. This rejection sparked a rumor of personal conflict between Ryamizard and Yudhoyono, which Abdurrahman Wahid speculated to be true. After retiring from his military career, Ryamizard initially did not want to enter into politics. However, in 2008, when he participated in a declaration by National Assembly of Indonesia organization, he had stated he will consider to be a presidential candidate should he get popular support. On 27 January 2009, he was invited to PDI-P national party congress, replacing Hidayat Nur Wahid whose invite got revoked, leading to speculations that Megawati will potentially name Ryamizard as her running mate in the 2009 Indonesian presidential election.

His vice presidential candidacy rumors surfaced once more when he was named one of the options for Joko Widodo's running mate, although the choice ultimately went to Jusuf Kalla. Regardless, Ryamizard Ryacudu endorsed Joko Widodo and Kalla and helped in their campaign by giving campaign advices to volunteers during the 2014 Indonesian presidential election. Jokowi later appointed Ryamizard as Minister of Defense in his Working Cabinet.

=== Minister of Defense ===
Ryamizard was appointed Minister of Defense on 27 October 2014. His appointment was opposed by military analysts who viewed that ex-military officials may slow down progress on the military as they may create bias in favor of the military branch they serve in. His appointment was criticized by human rights activists as he committed human rights violations in his military career.

As a minister, Ryamizard focused more on military reforms and internal stability. In his tenure, he prioritized the armed forces to handle domestic threats, including terrorism and radicalism. He also prioritized bilateral military cooperation especially between countries such as Australia and the United States.

His ministerial tenure oversaw the sale of the Tarlac-class landing platform dock to the Philippine Navy and numerous aircraft sales to numerous African countries. Hailing it as an achievement, Ryamizard pushed for advancements within the defense industry of Indonesia and lesser reliance on foreign imports.

He opposed government proposal to apologize to descendants of Communist Party of Indonesia cadres. He viewed that the killings of seven generals by communist forces is akin to a declaration of rebellion and states that the apology won't solve any human rights violation. He once favored reconciliation to solve alleged human rights violation cases during the time. However he later opposed reconciliation, stating that he rather had the government focus towards the future and citing US President Barack Obama's manner during his visit in Hiroshima as a reason to not advance with the reconciliation.

During the 2019 Indonesian general election, opposition presidential candidate Prabowo Subianto criticized Ryamizard's defence policy, stating that Indonesia can only fight in a war for three days as quoted by Ryamizard in Twitter 10 years ago. Ryamizard clarified that he did but the circumstances when he made the comment was different. He reassured that Indonesia can fight in a thousand years war at present thanks to Indonesia's national defence policy of "Total People's War". Ryamizard also rebuked Prabowo's speech regarding Indonesia's downfall in 2030, stating that the people have gotten smarter to differentiate facts and opinion.

== Death ==
Ryamizard died at the Gatot Soebroto Army Hospital in Central Jakarta on 31 May 2026, at the age of 76, due to heart failure. He was buried at the Kalibata Heroes' Cemetery the next day on 1 June.

== Honours ==
As an Indonesian Army officer and Minister of Defence, Ryamizard Ryacudu received the following awards and decorations:

=== National honours ===
- Star of Mahaputera, 2nd Class – 2020
- Star of Mahaputera, 3rd Class – 2005
- Star of Dharma
- Star of Yudha Dharma, 1st Class –
- Star of Kartika Eka Paksi, 1st Class
- Star of Jalasena, 1st Class
- Star of Swa Bhuwana Paksa, 1st Class
- Star of Yudha Dharma, 2nd Class
- Star of Kartika Eka Paksi, 2nd Class
- Star of Yudha Dharma, 3rd Class
- Star of Kartika Eka Paksi, 3rd Class
- Military Long Service Medal, 24 Years
- Military Instructor Service Medal
- Military Operation Service Medal VIII Dharma Pala
- Timor Military Campaign Medal
- Medal for Active International Military Duty
- Star of Peace Veteran – 2019

=== Foreign honours ===
Ribbon	Distinction	Country	Date	Reference
	Grand Cross of the Royal Order of Sahametrei	Cambodia		
	Courageous Commander of the Most Gallant Order of Military Service	Malaysia		
	Meritorious Service Medal (Military)	Singapore	2003	
	United Nations Transitional Authority in Cambodia (UNTAC) Medal	United Nations		

Political offices
Preceded by Purnomo Yusgiantoro	Minister of Defense; 2014–2019	Succeeded by Prabowo Subianto
Military offices
Preceded by Agus Wirahadikusumah	Commander of Kostrad; 2000–2002	Succeeded by Endriartono Sutarto
Preceded by Agus Wirahadikusumah	Chief of Staff of the Indonesian Army; 2002–2005	Succeeded by Djoko Santoso
