= Agus Wirahadikusumah =

Indonesian general

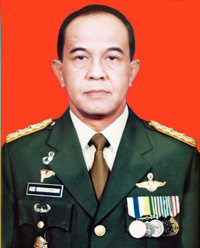
- Born: October 17, 1951
- Died: August 30, 2001 (aged 49); Jakarta, Indonesia
- Cause of death: Heart failure (alleged assassination)
- Burial place: Kalibata Heroes' Cemetery, Jakarta
- Education: Indonesian Military Academy (1973); Harvard University (John F. Kennedy School of Government)
- Spouse: Tri Rachmaningish
- Children: 2
- Relatives: Umar Wirahadikusumah (uncle)
- Military career
- Allegiance: Indonesia
- Branch: Indonesian Army
- Service years: 1973–2001
- Rank: Lieutenant General
- Unit: Kostrad
- Commands: Commander of Kostrad (2000)
- Awards: Satya Kebudayaan Medal

Lieutenant General (Ret.) Agus Wirahadikusumah (17 October 1951 – 30 August 2001), was a high-ranking Indonesian military officer and commander of Kostrad, the Indonesian Army Strategic Reserve Command.

== Military career ==
Wirahadikusumah was a graduate of the Indonesian military academy in 1973. He studied at institutions in the United States as well, including Harvard University (John F. Kennedy School of Government). In the last years of the 20th century, he became Head of the Planning Directorate in the Armed Forces Headquarters of Indonesia.

After the resignation of Suharto, Wirahadikusumah emerged as a reformer in the ranks of the armed forces. By 1998, he was, as a Major General, posted at Armed Forces Headquarters where he held the position of staff officer on the Armed Forces' Commander's Staff in charge of political affairs and security. In the same year, he called for the Indonesian military to stop their involvement in political affairs and for the army to become a professional defence force instead.

In January 1999, Major-General Agus Wirahadikusumah, who by now was Chief of the Army Staff and Command School, became the Assistant for General Planning to the Armed Forces Commander.

In 2000, President Abdurrahman Wahid appointed him Commander of the Strategic Reserve Forces Kostrad. He served in this position from 29 March 2000 to 1 August 2000. Wirahadikusumah supported Wahid's decisions, including that of dismissing General Wiranto as security minister. Wiranto referred to him as a "bad apple".

While Wirahadikusumah was popular with ordinary soldiers, he also created enemies for himself, as he took up the fight against corruption within Kostrad. As a consequence of these activities, he was dismissed from his post as Commander of Kostrad in summer 2000. However, according to Umar Wirahadikusumah, his uncle, the post of Chief of the Indonesian Military (TNI) had been offered to Agus Wirahadikusumah on 23 July 2001.

On 30 August 2001, Wirahadikusumah was brought into Pertamina Central Hospital in South Jakarta at 06:19. A hospital employee stated that he was already dead when he was brought in, that the cause of death was unknown and that no autopsy had been conducted. According to The Jakarta Post, the probable cause of death was heart failure. However, some people alleged that he might have been assassinated, due to his reformist stance and for uncovering 189 billion rupiah corruption scandal in Yayasan Dharma Putra Kostrad, a military owned charity organization. His body was then buried in Kalibata Heroes' Cemetery, Jakarta.

== Sports Associations ==
Apart from military affairs, Wirahadikusumah was also interested in sports and was Deputy Chairman of the Badminton Association of Indonesia. In this function he was instrumental in the 1998 plan to bring about meetings between former Indonesian Badminton champions (such as Tan Joe Hok) and their successors to share their experiences and make them better prepared for upcoming tournaments. In 1998, he was Manager of the Indonesian Thomas Cup team which won the Cup that year. Wirahadikusumah was awarded the Satya Kebudayaan Medal for this achievement by the Indonesian President Habibie on 9 September 1998.

== Family ==
Wirahadikusumah is a nephew of Umar Wirahadikusumah, a former Vice President of Indonesia and also a former Kostrad Commander.

Agus Wirahadikusumah married Tri Rachmaningish. They had two children: a son, Yunan Mahastra Satria (born 22 June 1977) and a daughter, Diyah Gustinar Savitri (born 14 July 1975).

== Notes ==
Military offices
Preceded by Djaja Suparman	Commanders of Kostrad; 29 March 2000 – 1 August 2000	Succeeded by Ryamizard Ryacudu
