= Subagyo Hadi Siswoyo =

Indonesian Army general (1946–2026)

- Siswoyo in 2015

Chief of Staff of the Indonesian Army
- In office 16 February 1998 – 20 November 1999
- President: Suharto; B. J. Habibie; Abdurrahman Wahid
- Preceded by: Wiranto
- Succeeded by: Tyasno Sudarto

Personal details
- Born: 12 June 1946 Yogyakarta, Indonesia
- Died: 19 October 2026 (aged 80) Yogyakarta, Indonesia
- Education: Indonesian National Army Academy

Military service
- Allegiance: Indonesia
- Branch/service: Indonesian Army
- Years of service: 1970–1999
- Rank: General
- Commands: Commander of Kopassus

Subagyo Hadi Siswoyo (12 June 1946 – 19 October 2026) was an Indonesian Army general. A member of the People's Conscience Party, he served as chief of staff of the Indonesian Army from 1998 to 1999.

Siswoyo died in Yogyakarta on 19 October 2026, at the age of 80.
