= Makmun Murod =

Indonesian diplomat

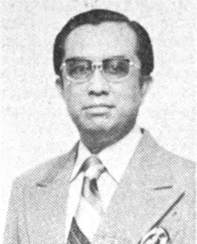
- Official portrait, 1977

Member of the People's Consultative Assembly
- In office 1 October 1977 – 30 September 1982
- President: Suharto

11th Chief of Staff of the Indonesian Army
- In office 10 May 1974 – 26 January 1978
- Preceded by: Surono Reksodimejo
- Succeeded by: Raden Widodo

Personal details
- Born: 24 December 1924 Baturaja, South Sumatra, Dutch East Indies
- Died: 13 September 2011 (aged 86) Jakarta, Indonesia
- Cause of death: Respiration complications
- Resting place: Kalibata Heroes' Cemetery
- Party: Golkar–ABRI
- Spouse: Martiana Murod
- Parent: Muhammad Murad (father)

Makmun Murod (24 December 1924 – 13 September 2011), was an Indonesian politician and general, who served as a member of the People's Consultative Assembly from 1977 until 1982. Previously, he served as the 11th Chief of Staff of the Indonesian Army from 1974 until 1978.

Makmun Murod was born in Baturaja, South Sumatra, on 24 December 1924, during Dutch rule. He was educated at the Hollandsch-Inlandsche School, and graduated in 1939. He joined the People's Security Agency, following the proclamation of Independence. During the Indonesian National Revolution, he served in the military. Following the end of the revolution, he remained in the military. He rose through the ranks, until he became the Chief of Staff of the Indonesian Army.

Makmun Murod died on 13 September 2011 at 12:45 at Pertamina Central Hospital, due to respiratory problems. He was buried in Kalibata Heroes' Cemetery.
