= Wiranto =

Indonesian general and politician

General (Ret.) Wiranto
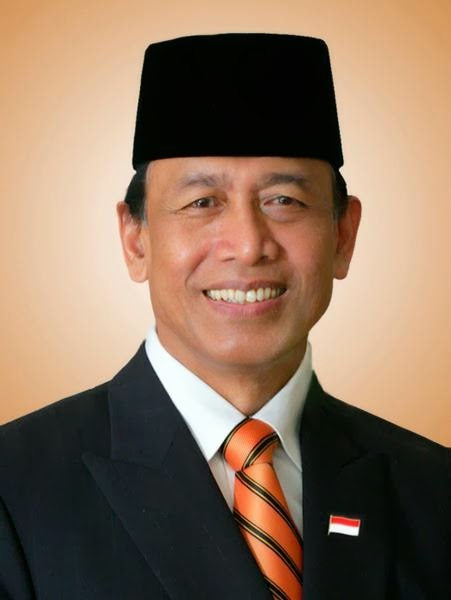
- Official portrait, 2016

5th Chairperson of the Presidential Advisory Council
- In office 13 December 2019 – 20 October 2024
- President: Joko Widodo
- Preceded by: Sri Adiningsih

6th Coordinating Minister for Political, Legal, and Security Affairs
- In office 27 July 2016 – 20 October 2019
- President: Joko Widodo
- Preceded by: Luhut Binsar Panjaitan
- Succeeded by: Mahfud MD
- In office 26 October 1999 – 15 February 2000
- President: Abdurrahman Wahid
- Preceded by: Feisal Tanjung
- Succeeded by: Soerjadi Soedirdja

1st General Chairman of the People's Conscience Party
- In office 21 December 2006 – 21 December 2016
- Preceded by: New political party
- Succeeded by: Oesman Sapta Odang

19th Minister of Defense and Security
- In office 14 March 1998 – 20 October 1999
- President: Suharto; B. J. Habibie
- Preceded by: Edi Sudradjat
- Succeeded by: Juwono Sudarsono
Military offices
12th Commander of the Indonesian National Armed Forces
In office 16 February 1998 – 26 October 1999
President	Suharto; B. J. Habibie
Preceded by	General Feisal Tanjung
Succeeded by	Admiral Widodo Adi Sutjipto
19th Chief of Staff of the Indonesian Army
In office 7 June 1997 – 16 February 1998
President	Suharto
Preceded by	General Hartono
Succeeded by	General Subagyo Hadi Siswoyo
20th Commander of Kostrad
In office 4 April 1996 – 20 June 1997
President	Suharto
Preceded by	Maj. Gen. Tarub
Succeeded by	Lt. Gen. Sugiono

Personal details
- Born: 4 April 1947 (age 79) Yogyakarta, Indonesia
- Party: Independent (since 2019)
- Other political affiliations: Golkar (1999–2006); Hanura (2006–2019)
- Spouse: Rugaiya Usman (m. 1975)
- Children: 3
- Education: Indonesian Military Academy; Indonesian Army Command and General Staff College; Indonesia Open University; National Resilience Institute; Institute of Military Laws; Jakarta Institute of Economy; State University of Jakarta
- Occupation: Politician; army officer
- Website: Archived website

Military service
- Allegiance: Indonesia
- Branch/service: Indonesian Army
- Years of service: 1968–1999
- Rank: General
- Unit: Infantry
- Commands: Indonesian Army; Indonesian Armed Forces
- Battles/wars: Operation Lotus
- Service no.: 22166

Wiranto (born 4 April 1947) is an Indonesian politician and retired army general, who was the chairman of the Presidential Advisory Council, from December 2019 to October 2024. Previously, he was the Commander of the Indonesian Armed Forces from February 1998 to October 1999 during Indonesia's transition from authoritarian rule to democracy. He ran unsuccessfully for President of Indonesia in 2004 and for the vice-presidency in 2009. On 27 July 2016, Wiranto was appointed Coordinating Minister for Political, Legal, and Security Affairs, replacing Luhut Binsar Panjaitan.

Wiranto played a significant role in facilitating severe human rights violations by the Indonesian army and Jakarta-backed militias, during Indonesia's withdrawal from the occupied territory of East Timor in 1999. Both the United Nations and domestic groups have gathered evidence on this, but he continues to deny the charges. In January 2000, an Indonesian commission placed general responsibility for these injustices on Wiranto. In May 2004, the United Nations-backed Special Panels of the Dili District Court indicted Wiranto and charged him with war crimes. Wiranto claimed the move was an effort to discredit his political ambitions.

Some claim that Wiranto played a key role as a moderating influence during the turbulent times of 1998 when Suharto resigned. He had the power to impose military rule, but refused to do so, thereby allowing the civilian process to develop. Taufik Darusman labeled him a "military reformist" because Wiranto reduced the military's role in Indonesian politics. He initiated the reduction of their seats in parliament and separated the police from the military. Nonetheless, more than 2,000 East Timorese were killed in violence under his watch, as well as 500,000 forced into displacement. The security forces of Indonesia also perpetrated the Biak massacre in July 1998, when Wiranto was the Minister of Defense of Indonesia.

== Early life, family, and education ==
=== Early life and family ===
Wiranto was born on April 4, 1947, in Yogyakarta to R.S. Wirowijoto, a primary school teacher and Suwarsijah. He was the sixth out of nine children. Only one month old, Wiranto and his family moved from Yogyakarta to Boyolali near Surakarta for safety reasons as the Dutch were planning to launch an attack on Yogyakarta. At Surakarta, Wiranto completed his primary and secondary education.

=== Education ===
When he was a child, Wiranto dreamed of a military career, but as he grew up, he developed the desire to become an architect. However, training to become an architect was not feasible financially, so Wiranto decided to join the Indonesian Military Academy in Magelang in Central Java, now known as Akademi Militer or Akmil.

== Military career ==
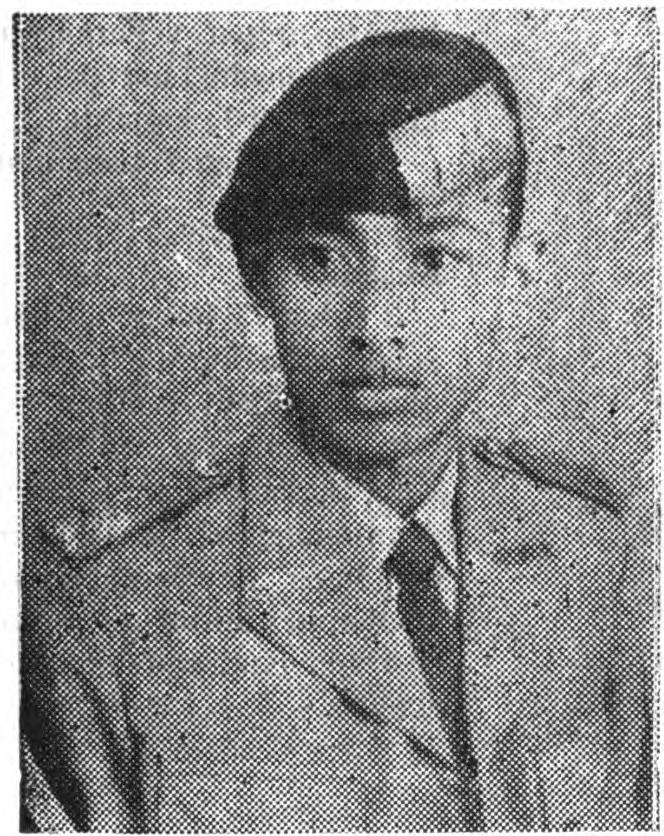
Wiranto in 1968

=== Early career ===
Wiranto graduated from the Indonesian Military Academy in 1968 and spent the early part of his military career in North Sulawesi, far from the centers of power in Indonesia. There he worked his way up from being a Platoon Commander to a Battalion Commander in 1982. From there he worked in the Armed Forces headquarters (formerly known as ABRI HQ, or headquarters of the Angkatan Bersenjata Republik Indonesia) for two years before joining the high-profile Kostrad (a corp-level and well-equipped command within the Indonesian armed forces) in 1985 as a Brigade Chief of Staff in East Java. In 1987, he was transferred to Jakarta where he became Deputy Operations Assistant to the Kostrad Chief of Staff.

=== Aide-de-camp to Suharto ===
In 1989, his career had a major break when he was selected to become an aide-de-camp to President Suharto. The position of presidential aide-de-camp was a prestigious one during the New Order, as it became a launching pad for officers to have successful military careers. By Wiranto's own accounts, 2 Army Commanders, 3 Armed Services Chiefs of Staff, and 2 Chiefs of Police, had served as presidential aide-de-camp during their career.

=== Chief of Staff ===
In 1993, Wiranto became Chief of Staff in the Jakarta regional military command (Komando Daerah Militer for Jakarta, or KODAM Jaya) and became commander of KODAM Jaya in 1994. Two years later, he became commander of Kostrad and in 1997, was appointed Army Chief of Staff. At this stage of his career, it was speculated that Wiranto, together with Susilo Bambang Yudhoyono, Agum Gumelar, A.M. Hendropriyono, and Farid Zainuddin were the top five officers from ABRI's secular/Nationalist "Red and White" faction.

=== Fall of Suharto ===
Wiranto's appointment as Commander of ABRI in February 1998 came at a crucial time. Indonesia was suffering from the effects of the Asian Financial Crisis and there was widespread opposition to Suharto. Nevertheless, Suharto was re-elected for a seventh term as president by the People's Consultative Assembly (MPR) as the situation continued to deteriorate. In Suharto's new Cabinet, Wiranto was named as the Minister of Defense and Security.

As the situation worsened, Wiranto tried to calm the situation down through dialogue. On 18 April 1998, together with 17 ministers, Wiranto held a meeting with prominent members of society and student organizations. Wiranto took a cautious stance towards the social unrest that was brewing around Indonesia at the time and warned against it descending into anarchy.

Wiranto's involvement with the events of May 1998 began by ordering most senior military commanders to go to Malang in East Java (850 km from Jakarta) for a ceremonial party, during the riot in the capital Jakarta. Later he authorized Commander of KODAM Jaya Sjafrie Sjamsoeddin and Chief of Jakarta Regional Police Hamami Nata to take care of the situation in Jakarta. That was the day when four students of Trisakti University were shot dead. Wiranto responded on 13 May by ordering the Military Police to mobilize. Wiranto also sensed that the condition was about to spiral out of control and ordered reinforcements in the form of Marines and Kostrad personnel.

On 15 May, Wiranto met with Suharto who had gone to Egypt to attend an economic summit but was forced to come back to attend to the situation back home. Suharto brought up the idea of reinstating the Command for the Restoration of Security and Order (Kopkamtib) to deal with the situation. Finally, on 18 May, Suharto issued a Presidential Instruction (Instruksi Presiden No 16/1998) to Wiranto. Wiranto was to be made Commander of the National Alertness and Safety Operation Command (KOPKKN). This presidential instruction has been compared to the Supersemar, a key letter of authority which former president Sukarno issued in March 1966 providing the then-Major General Suharto with wide authority over government in Indonesia. Suharto's Presidential Instruction in May 1998 was seen as providing Wiranto with wide authority to choose whether to use his new power or not.

On 21 May 1998, Suharto announced his resignation as president. Vice President BJ Habibie took over as president. Wiranto took the opportunity to state that ABRI would be ensuring the personal safety of the now former President Suharto and his family. Wiranto subsequently admitted the involvement of Kopassus special forces in the 1997–98 activists kidnappings in Indonesia.

=== Habibie presidency ===
Wiranto was retained as both the Commander of ABRI and Minister of Defense and Security in Habibie's Cabinet. He immediately began working towards reforming ABRI and on 11 June, gave to Habibie and Head of People's Representative Council/MPR Chairman Harmoko a manifesto entitled "The Fundamentals of ABRI's Philosophy on Reform Towards Achieving the National Goal". In August, Wiranto made a move to appease the people of Aceh by withdrawing the status of Military Operations Region (DOM) from the Province.

The Special Session of the MPR was held in November 1998 and Wiranto cracked down on protesters who were against the Special Session, killing 8 and injuring 226. Despite this setback, Wiranto continued to build an image as a reformer. In January 1999, he met with reformist leaders and in April 1999, supervised the establishment of the Republic of Indonesia Police (POLRI) as an autonomous entity rather than subordinate to ABRI. ABRI also went through a name change and became known as TNI. Wiranto also supervised security during the 1999 Legislative Elections during which TNI and POLRI adopted a neutral role rather than support Golkar as had been the case during Suharto's regime. As Commander of TNI, Wiranto was also involved with the withdrawal of troops from East Timor when the Province voted to become an independent nation. In the process he became accused of being behind or at least condoned the human rights abuses committed by TNI soldiers during the retreat from Timor.

=== 1999 MPR General Session ===
Much like the 1999 legislative election, Wiranto was in charge of security at the 1999 MPR General Session. However, he would soon become involved in the politics. Habibie, who had been nominated for re-election by Golkar chose Wiranto to become his vice president. However, Habibie's accountability speech was rejected by the MPR and he chose not to run for president again. Nevertheless, Wiranto continued on as vice presidential candidate, this time with Akbar Tandjung as Golkar's presidential candidate. However, Akbar would withdraw from the race and throw his support behind eventual President Abdurrahman Wahid. Wiranto finally withdrew from the vice presidential race when it became evident that Megawati needed to become vice president to appease her supporters who were angered by Megawati losing out on the Presidency.

== Political career ==
=== Wahid presidency ===
As part of his effort to name a Cabinet which included all elements of Indonesian politics, Wahid included Wiranto in the Cabinet as Coordinating Minister of Politics and Security. Wiranto was only in his position for three months when in January 2000, Wahid called for Wiranto to step down from his position on an overseas trip to Europe. It appeared as if the President saw Wiranto as an obstacle to his plan to reform the military and that he took the human rights abuses allegations seriously. Wiranto waited until Wahid returned before meeting with the President to argue his case. Wiranto seemed to have succeeded when Wahid decided to continue to keep him on but changed his mind during the same day and Wiranto was removed from the Cabinet.

=== Megawati presidency ===
In January 2003, President Megawati was forced to raise the prices of fuel, electricity, and telephone. Anti-Megawati protests were then held and it was suspected that Wiranto might have been involved in masterminding the demonstrations.

=== Human rights indictment ===
On 24 February 2003, the Special Panels of the Dili District Court indicted Wiranto and charged him with crimes against humanity. However, prosecutor-general of East Timor, Longuinhos Monteiro, withdrew support for the indictment claiming there "might be some defects". East Timor sources believe Monteiro reversed his position following heavy pressure from senior figures in East Timor's Government.

The warrant was never forwarded to Interpol.

=== Presidential candidate ===
In August 2003, Wiranto made the decision to run for president after he declared his intentions to participate in the Golkar National Convention. Wiranto's opponents for the convention were Akbar, Prabowo, Aburizal Bakrie, Surya Paloh, Jusuf Kalla, Sultan Hamengkubuwono X, and Nurcholish Madjid. By April 2004, the month of the National Convention, Hamengkubuwono X and Nurcolish had withdrawn from the race whilst Kalla left Golkar to become Yudhoyono's running mate. On 20 April 2004, the Golkar National Convention was held. In the first round of voting, Wiranto came second to Akbar with 137 votes to 147 votes. In the second round, Wiranto decisively won against Akbar with 315 votes to 227 votes and became Golkar's Presidential Candidate.

As his running mate, Wiranto chose Solahuddin Wahid, the brother of former President Wahid. The selection of Solahuddin was to improve Wiranto's image with regards to human rights. According to Wiranto "Because Gus Solah (Solahuddin's nickname) is a clean figure, of course he would not associate himself with dirty goods. Especially when he's the Vice-Chairman of the National Commission on Human Rights (Komnas HAM). So I'm clean." In addition to Golkar, Wiranto also drew support from Wahid who mobilized both his National Awakening Party (PKB) and the Nadhlatul Ulama (NU) to Wiranto's cause.

On Election Day 5 July 2004, Wiranto and Solahuddin came third behind Yudhoyono/Kalla and Megawati/Hasyim Muzadi with 22.19% of the votes.

=== Yudhoyono presidency ===
In the lead up to the 2004 Golkar National Congress, Wiranto became one of the candidates for the position of Chairman. However, the situation soon changed when Kalla, now Vice President, participated in the contest to become Chairman with the support of President Yudhoyono. Wiranto was not happy because according to him, Yudhoyono would not do anything to block Wiranto from becoming Chairman. Wiranto then chose to align himself with his former opponent Akbar. However the two failed and Kalla became the new Chairman.

In August 2005, Wiranto, together with former Presidents Wahid and Megawati, former Vice President Try Sutrisno, and Akbar met to discuss and criticize the policies of the Yudhoyono Government. On 1 September, they signed an official statement and called themselves the United Awakened Archipelago Coalition (Koalisi Nusantara Bangkit Bersatu).

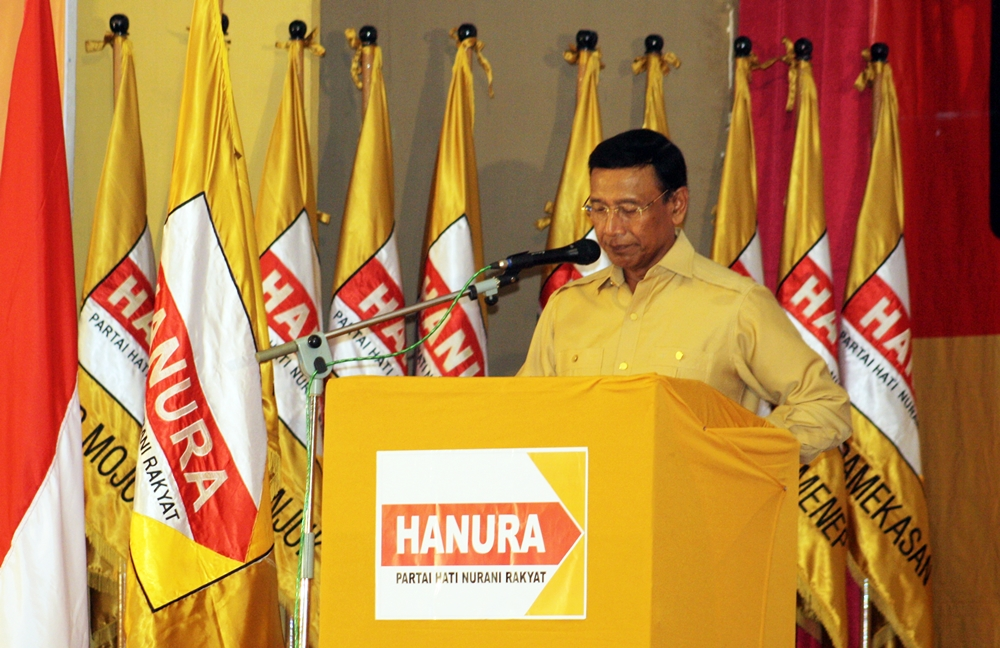
Wiranto at the Hanura Party event

The next month in September 2005, Wiranto joined the Nationhood Union, a mass organization which was created by former Golkar member Marwah Daud Ibrahim. At the organization's National Leadership Meeting in May 2006, Wiranto said that the organization was a way to test the waters en route to forming a new political party. Finally on 22 December 2006, Wiranto declared the formation of the People's Conscience Party (Hanura) and was elected as its first Chairman.

=== Vice-presidential candidate ===
Wiranto ran unsuccessfully for the vice-presidency as Jusuf Kalla's running mate in the 2009 Indonesian presidential election.

=== Joko Widodo presidency ===
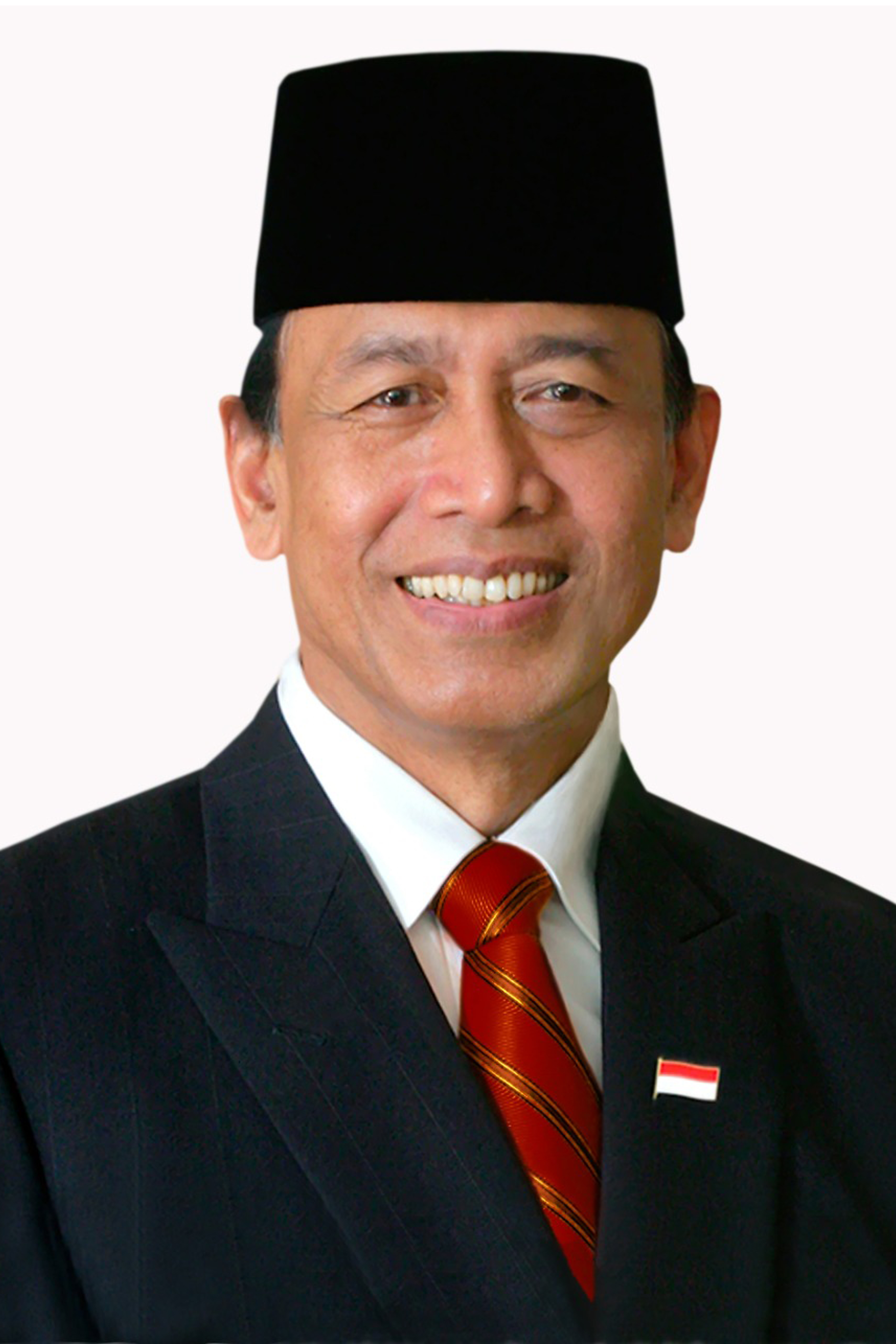
Wiranto as Coordinating Ministry for Political, Legal, and Security Affairs, 2016

Wiranto in July 2013 announced he would run for the presidency in 2014 with media tycoon Hary Tanoesoedibjo as his running mate, but after Hanura's poor performance in the 2014 general election, Wiranto opted to support the presidential bid of Joko Widodo, who was victorious.

When Jokowi reshuffled his cabinet on 27 July 2016, Wiranto was appointed Coordinating Minister for Political, Legal and Security Affairs. In December 2016, Wiranto said Hanura would support Jokowi for re-election in 2019. In 2018, Wiranto urged the Corruption Eradication Commission to postpone naming regional election candidates suspected of involvement in corruption cases.

==== Knife attack ====
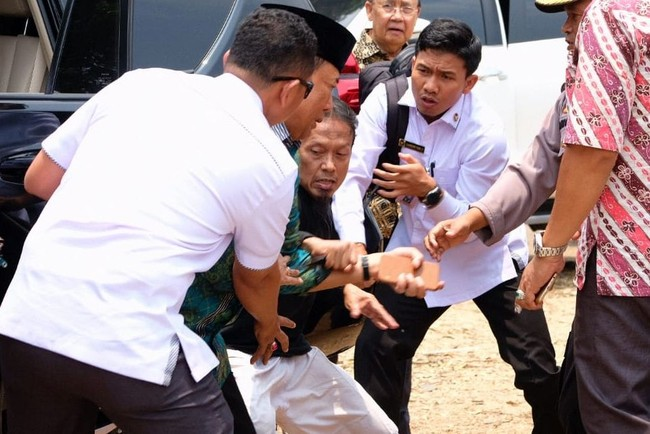
Wiranto (wearing a peci) during the knife attack on 10 October 2019

On 10 October 2019, Wiranto was stabbed twice by a man allegedly affiliated with the Islamic State-linked militant group Jamaah Ansharut Daulah (JAD). The attack occurred when Wiranto was exiting a car near the small town of Saketi, south of the main town of Pandeglang in Pandeglang Regency in Banten province, around 100 km southwest of Jakarta. Wiranto survived and was flown by helicopter to the Gatot Soebroto Army Hospital in Jakarta, where he underwent surgery. Three other people, including a police officer, were stabbed and wounded while attempting to protect Wiranto and apprehend the assailant.

After treatment, Wiranto's condition was stable and improved. President Joko Widodo visited him twice and said that, "(He) told me he wants to go home and join the limited Cabinet meeting soon." A range of other Indonesian leaders and senior officials visited Wiranto in hospital including vice-president Jusuf Kalla, state intelligence agency head Budi Gunawan, former coordinating minister for political, legal and security affairs Tedjo Edhy Purdijatno, and presidential advisory board member Agum Gumelar.

The attacker, identified as Syahrial Alamsyah alias Abu Rara, was apprehended at the scene, along with his wife, Fitria Diana (20), who stabbed a local sub-district police chief, Commissioner Dariyanto, in the back. Abu Rara said he was not part of a terror cell and he only decided to make the attack when he heard a helicopter and found out the Wiranto was visiting. Authorities said Abu Rara had previously been under observation because of his collection of knives. While officials said the attacker was believed to a member of JAD, some conservative Muslim politicians claimed the attack was staged, such as Hanum Rais (daughter of Muslim leader Amien Rais). Harits Abu Ulya, a spokesman for a group called the Community of Ideological Islamic Analyst (CIIA), claimed Wiranto himself was partly to blame for the attack because the minister's statements had hurt people's feelings.

==== Chairperson of Presidential Advisory Council ====
After Jokowi was sworn in for a second five-year term in October 2019, Wiranto—still recovering from the knife attack—lost his cabinet position, but by December 2019 he had recovered and was appointed to lead the nine-member Presidential Advisory Council. Due to party neutrality requirement to become the chairperson of the council, Wiranto left Hanura automatically per se.

== Personal life ==
Wiranto has been married to Rugaiya Usman (Uga) since 1975. She is active in her role as, among others, Head of Indonesian Red Cross of Jakarta Chapter. The couple has three children: Lia, Maya, and Zainal. Zainal died of an undisclosed illness in May 2013 in South Africa, where he had recently begun pursuing Islamic studies.

On October 10, 2019, Wiranto was stabbed with a sharp weapon by a man in Menes Square, Pandeglang, Banten. As a result, Wiranto suffered a stab wound to the front of his body. Apart from Wiranto, the attack injured the Head of the Sector Police, Menes Commissary Police Dariyanto, who was at the location. Wiranto's men were also injured in the attack. The suspect is Syahril Alamsyah, alias Abu Rara, born in Medan on August 24, 1968, and a woman who is suspected to be with the perpetrator on behalf of Fitri Andriana, born in Brebes on May 5, 1998, was arrested. The head of the Public Information Bureau of the National Police Headquarters Brigadier General Dedi Prasetyo said the two perpetrators of the attack on Wiranto were suspected of being exposed to Islamic State radicalism and after the incident, he had to be rushed to the nearest hospital for first aid and referred to Gatot Soebroto Army Hospital, Jakarta.

== Cases ==
=== Controversy and allegations of human rights violations ===
Wiranto has been accused of being involved in war crimes in East Timor in 1999. Together with five other military officers suspected of being involved, Wiranto has been accused by the International Court of Justice of having a role in the 1999 East Timorese crisis that occurred around the time of the East Timorese sovereignty referendum.

The Indonesian human rights courts refused to investigate the officers and police officers that had been accused of being involved in human rights violations during the end of the Indonesian occupation. The refusal to prosecute is considered to have undermined the existing evidence. Wiranto and the five other officers are on the list of suspected war criminals and barred from entering the United States.

United Nations prosecutors have advised the government of East Timor to issue an international arrest warrant for the former general, however none was ever issued. Nicholas Koumjian, a United Nations prosecutor from the Special Serious Criminal Court in Dili said Wiranto should be held responsible for the 1999 violence. He also said that Wiranto had failed to carry out his responsibilities as the leader of the military and police forces in East Timor to prevent crimes against humanity and failed to punish the perpetrators of these crimes.

== Honours ==
=== National ===
- Star of the Republic of Indonesia, 3rd Class (Indonesian: Bintang Republik Indonesia Utama) (25 August 2025)
- Star of Mahaputera, 2nd Class (Indonesian: Bintang Mahaputera Adipradana) (1999)
- Star of Meritorious Service (Indonesian: Bintang Dharma)
- Grand Meritorious Military Order Star, 1 Class (Indonesian: Bintang Yudha Dharma Utama)
- Army Meritorious Service Star, 1 Class (Indonesian: Bintang Kartika Eka Paksi Utama) (1997)
- Navy Meritorious Service Star, 1 Class (Indonesian: Bintang Jalasena Utama)
- Air Force Meritorious Service Star, 1 Class (Indonesian: Bintang Swa Bhuana Paksa Utama)
- Star of Bhayangkara, 1st Class (Indonesian: Bintang Bhayangkara Utama)

=== Foreign honours ===
- Brunei:
  - First Class of the Order of Paduka Keberanian Laila Terbilang (DPKT) (1995) - Dato Paduka Seri
- Malaysia:
  - Honorary Commander of the Order of the Defender of the Realm (P.M.N.) - Tan Sri (1999)
  - Courageous Commander of the Most Gallant Order of Military Service (PGAT)
- Netherlands:
  - Knight Grand Cross of the Order of Orange-Nassau
- Singapore
  - Recipient of the Darjah Utama Bakti Cemerlang (Tentera) (DUBC) (1999)
  - Pingat Jasa Gemilang (Tentera) (PJG) (1997)
- Spain:
  - Grand Cross with White Decoration of the Order of Military Merit

Political offices
Preceded by Luhut Binsar Panjaitan	Coordinating Minister for Political, Legal, and Security Affairs; 2016–2019	Succeeded by Mahfud MD
Preceded by Feisal Tanjung	Coordinating Minister for Political, Legal, and Security Affairs; 1999–2000	Succeeded by Soerjadi Soedirdja
Preceded by Edi Sudradjat	Minister of Defense and Security; 1998–1999	Succeeded by Juwono Sudarsono
Military offices
Preceded by Feisal Tanjung	Commander of the Indonesian National Armed Forces; 1998–1999	Succeeded by Widodo Adi Sutjipto
Preceded by Hartono	Chief of Staff of the Indonesian Army; 1997–1998	Succeeded by Subagyo Hadi Siswoyo
