= Endriartono Sutarto =

Indonesian general

General (Ret.) Endriartono Sutarto DPKT PGAT DUBC KCE PJG GCCT
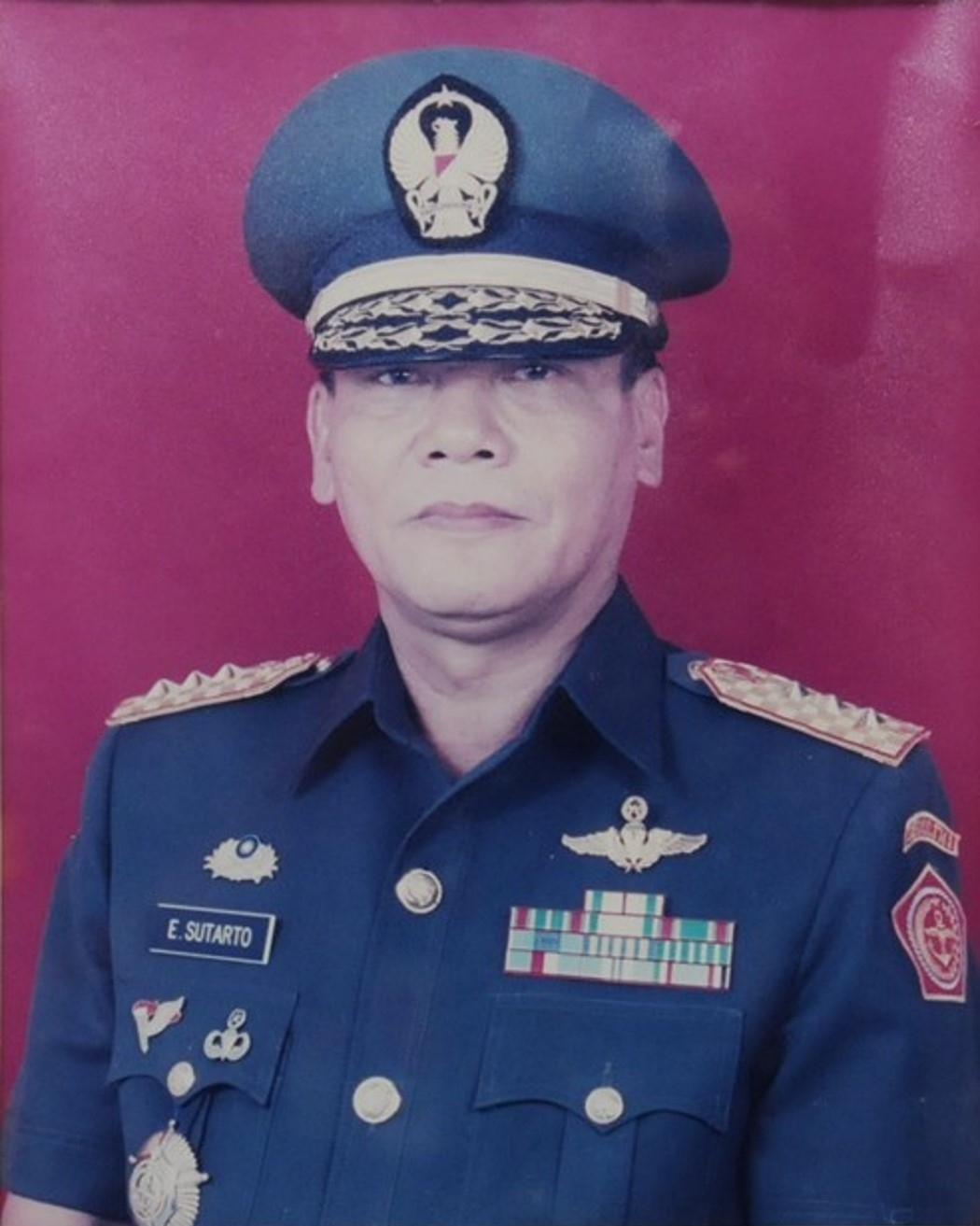

Commander of the Indonesian National Armed Forces
- In office 7 June 2002 – 13 February 2006
- President: Megawati Soekarnoputri; Susilo Bambang Yudhoyono
- Preceded by: Admiral Widodo Adi Sutjipto
- Succeeded by: Air Chief Marshal Djoko Suyanto

Indonesian Army Chief of staff
- In office 9 October 2000 – 4 June 2002
- President: Abdurrahman Wahid; Megawati Soekarnoputri
- Preceded by: General Tyasno Sudarto
- Succeeded by: General Ryamizard Ryacudu

Personal details
- Born: Endriartono Sutarto; 29 April 1947 (age 79) Purworejo, Central Java, Indonesia
- Party: National Democratic Party (NASDEM)
- Parent: Drs. Sutarto

Military service
- Allegiance: Indonesia
- Branch/service: Indonesian Army
- Years of service: 1971–2006
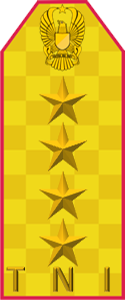
- Rank: General
- Battles/wars: Insurgency in Aceh

Endriartono Sutarto (born 29 April 1947) is an Indonesian retired army general. He served as the commander of the Indonesian National Armed Forces from 2002 to 2006.

Before assuming the highest helm in the military, Endriartono served in some key positions in the Army, including the Army Chief of Staff (9 October 2000 – 4 June 2002), the Army Deputy Chief of Staff, and the Commander of Indonesia Military School of Commander. Previously he also served as operation assistant to the army's chief of general staff at the TNI Headquarters. When former president Suharto stepped down on 21 May, Endriartono was his commander of the presidential guard.

== Personal life ==
His parents were Sutarto and Siti Sumarti Sutarto. Endriartono has three children, one daughter named Ratri Indrihapsari and two sons, Indra Gunawan Sutarto and M. Adi Prasantyo Sutarto, from his marriage with Andy Widayati.

== Military career ==
Endriartono's military career soared during the administration of former president Abdurrahman “Gus Dur” Wahid until 9 October, when the president installed him as Army Chief (KASAD) replacing Gen. Tyasno Sudarto.

Apart from his seasoned military knowledge, Endriartono who speaks fluent English has completed his undergraduate degree from Military Law School (STHM) in Jakarta.

Endriartono has also taken a wide range of military courses during his military career, including Sussarcab Infanteri (Infantry Basic Branch/Corps Course), Suslapa I Infanteri (Infantry Officer Advanced Course), Army School for Commanders (SESKOAD), Armed Forces Commanders’ School (SESKO ABRI), and National Resilience Institute (Lemhanas). Additionally, he also completed the Susjurpa Course, English Course, Air Borne, Ranger, Path Finder Course, Combat Instructor Course, and Infantry Battalion Commander Course.

He attained a military top post when former president Megawati Soekarnoputri appointed him TNI chief on 2 June 2002. The country's history recorded him as the 12th Indonesian Military Chief.

The downfall of the New Order and the birth of the Reform era in 1998 marked a change in the Indonesian military. The TNI underwent several reforms in the newly established democracy, focusing on defense and security and avoiding political influences.

Public trust has gradually been earned by the TNI, owing to a series of top-down reforms. The neutrality of the military was affirmed when the country had its first-ever direct election in 2004 and the Indonesian military ignored calls to interfere with the elections. Under the leadership of then Gen. Endriartono Sutarto, the forces opposed the attempts. Endriartono worked against political infiltration of the TNI. The 2004 elections was then dubbed the most democratic elections the country ever had. Retired military general, Susilo Bambang Yudhoyono was elected president and TNI remained keeping its distance from political practices. Endriartono has demonstrated his true patriotic call and played crucial role in keeping TNI neutrality in the 2004 general elections.

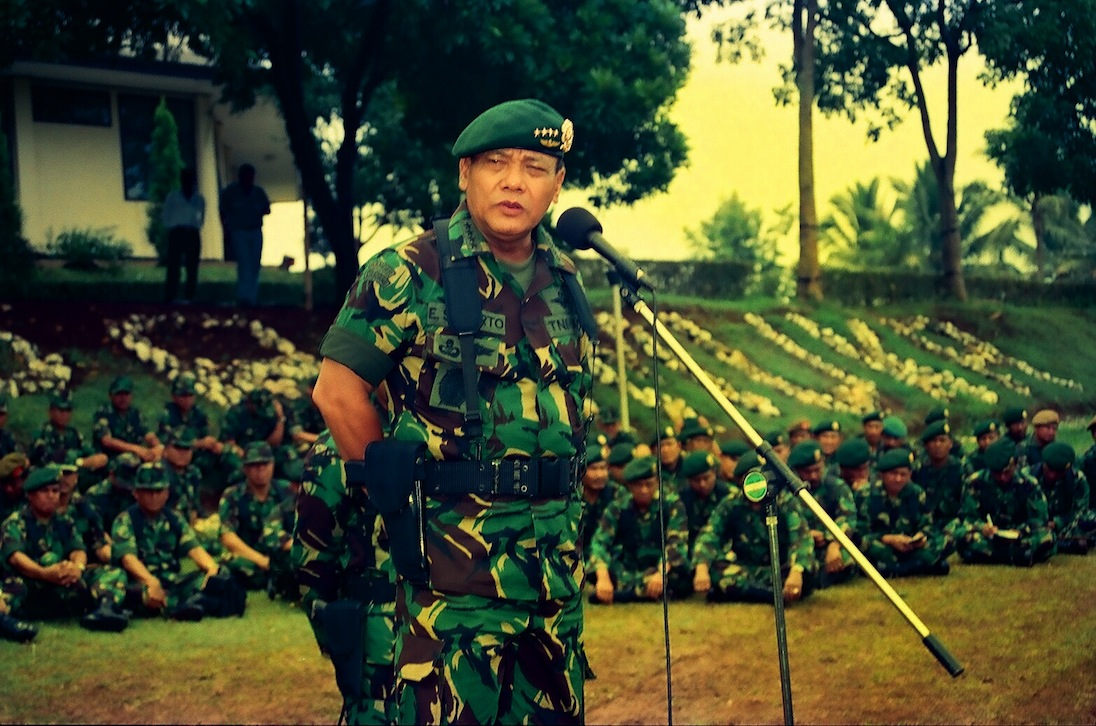
Endriartono Sutarto while serving as Commander of the Indonesian National Armed Forces

During his tenure, several major cases involved TNI and security-defense policies in Indonesia. An instance of point in case was the making of the Aceh peace agreement that was achieved after a long diplomatic negotiation process in Helsinki, Finland. Endriartono, as TNI chief then, became a deciding factor in the success of Aceh peace agreement and its implementation in the westernmost province where Free Aceh Movement had been in war with the military. In the wake of tsunami that hit the province in 2004, doors were opened for both warring parties to agree on making peace.

For his commandable role and integrity in keeping TNI neutrality, advancing tsunami humanitarian operations instead of military operation in Aceh, maintaining peace during its critical times, and dedication to the country, on 10 November 2008 Modernisator recognized Endriartono and awarded him "Present Day Hero".

Other achievement that Endriartono made during his tenure as TNI chief was when he decided to place and rank all forces in purely equal linear position. The Army, the Navy and Air Forces were equal in so many ways.

Endriartono broke the old tradition in the military that the Army was perceived to be more dominant than other forces. And he made the change of tradition systematically, clearly and firmly. Certain posts usually assumed by army officers were hauled by balancing the structures and used merit-based appraisal to promote officers regardless of their forces.

Endriartono who was a high-ranking army officer announced that he deeply respected other forces; the Navy and the Air Forces. Under his leadership, officers from the Air Forces could begin assuming posts like Logistics Assistant Chief at the TNI Headquarters and even become chief of general staff, a post that had been traditionally, for decades, became a regular one for Army officer.

Likewise, the post of General Secretary at the Defense Ministry was for the first time assigned to an Air Force officer. Three-star-generals at the TNI Headquarters used to be dominated by the Army were restructured into three positions dedicated respectively for the Army, the Navy and the Air Forces. Endriartono tendered his post to a successor from the Air Forces.

=== Military highlights ===
These are a few positions were held by Endriartono:

- Graduated from Indonesian Armed Forces Academy (1971)
- Platoon Chief A/305 Kostrad (1972–1975)
- Banki B/328 Kostrad (1976)
- Kostrad Kompi commander (1975–1979)
- Operation Chief of Infantry Battalion (Kasiops Yonif) Kostrad (1979–1981)
- Chief of Operation at 330 Kostrad (1980)
- Lecturer at Indonesian Military School for Officer Candidates (Secapa AD) (1982–1984)
- Commander of Infantry Battalion (Danyonif) 514 Kostrad (1985–1987)
- Chief of Garuda IX (1988–1989)
- Chief of staff of Infantry Air Borne Brigade (Kasbrigif Linud) 17/1 Kostrad (1989–1991)
- Assistant to Operation Chief of Jakarta Military Command (1993–1994)
- Military Resort Commander 173 Dam-VIII/Trikora (1994–1995)
- Chief of staff of Infantry Division (Kas Divif) 1 Kostrad (1995–1996)
- Deputy Assistant of General Planning to TNI Chief (Waasrenum Pangab) (1996)
- Deputy operation assistant to the Army Chief of Staff (Waasops Kasad) (1996–1997)
- Commander of Presidential Guard (Paspampres) (1997–1998)
- Assistant to Chief of General Staff (Asops Kasum) ABRI (1998–1999)
- Commander of School for TNI Commanders (Sesko TNI) (1999–2000)
- Deputy Army Chief of Staff (WAKASAD) (2000)
- Army Chief of Staff (KASAD) (2000)
- Indonesia Military Commander (2002–2006)

== Post military career ==
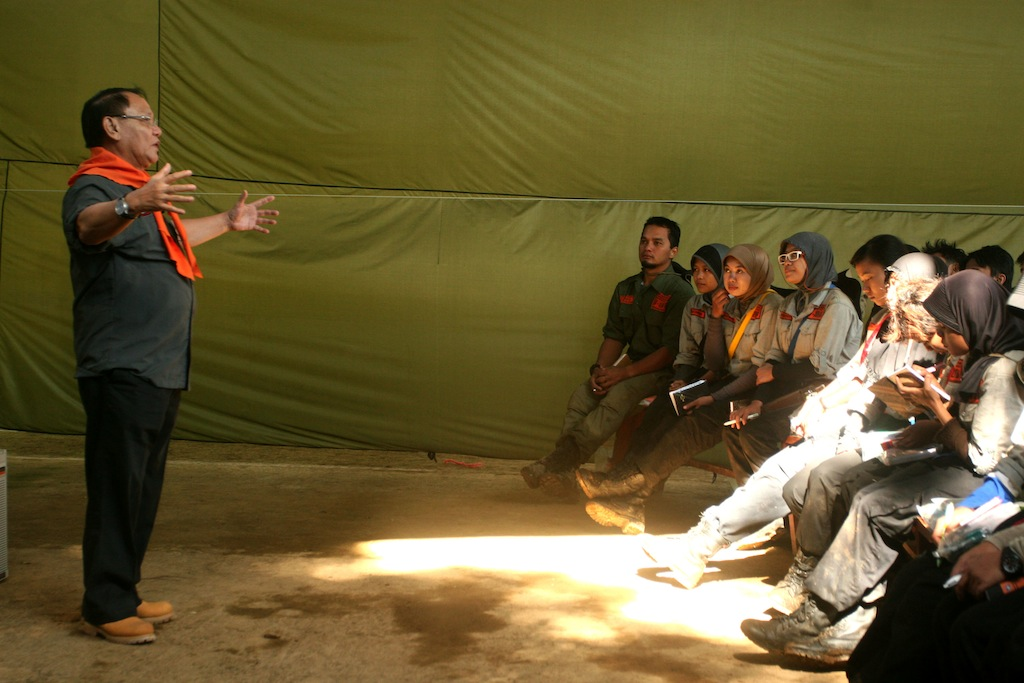
From 2010 Endriartono Sutarto has been active as the executive chairman for 7 Summits Expedition Wanadri

After resigning from military, Endriartono Sutarto continues his activities in a number of organizations. His passion for activism and organization was shown in his tender age when he chaired student organization at his school, public high school SMAN 2 Bandung from 1966 to 1967.

In September 2010, Endriartono was on advisory board for KPK (Commission for Corruption Eradication) defense team. His involvement in the board defending KPK had stirred speculations that there were “invisible powerful hands” were behind the attempts to criminalize KPK leaders then, Bibit Samad Riyanto and Chandra M. Hamzah. “I don’t want to speculate. But if that’s the case, with me in the board (Bibit-Chandra defense team), the ‘invisible powerful hands’ must think twice to continue whatever they intend to do,” Endriarto once said.

From 2010 Endriartono has been active as the executive chairman for 7 Summits Expedition Wanadri and also become an advisor for Indonesia Mengajar Movement. Tireless, Endriartono is also advisor for Indonesia Setara Foundation.

His experience in leading the armed forces of the world’s fourth most populous country has earned him international recognition. He was invited by Military Dialog Center to help seek resolutions to the Myanmar conflict.

== Political career ==
Endriartono began his involvement in political practices in September 2012. Some suspect that Endriartono’s move to political stage is part of his plan to race in the 2014 presidential election. Endriartono formally joined in the National Democratic (Nasdem) Party in 30 September 2012. During an interview at the popular talk show Mata Najwa aired by Metro TV, Endriartono said he had not yet joined in Nasdem Party but he was part of its mass organization. He officially began his political career as a member of Nasdem Party’s advisory council and has been rumored as strongest candidate to take the highest helm as the party chairman on the party’s upcoming national congress scheduled to be held at the end of January 2013.

Endriartono’s decision to join Nasdem Party has raised questions to many quarters. However, Endriartono stressed that he only had one reason that was to make a change. “It takes power to be able to make a change, without power we cannot do anything. That how the (political) system works here. To get the power we must win the election, if not the presidential post, at least we can get a hold of the House of Representatives (DPR) so we can create pro-people policies,” he said.

In a survey on the 2014 presidential election by LSI (Lingkar Survei Indonesia) Endriartono was listed as one of alternative candidates to be Indonesia President based on five categories:

- Able to lead the country and the administration
- Does not commit or is opinionated to commit corruption practices or bribery
- Does not commit or is opinionated to commit crime or human right abuse
- Honest, trustable, or can be trusted
- Able to stand above all groups or interests

The rank based on LSI survey is as follows:

1. Mahfud MD 79
2. Jusuf Kalla 77
3. Dahlan Iskan 76
4. Sri Mulyani 72
5. Hidayat Nurwahid 71
6. Agus Martowardojo 68
7. Megawati Soekarnoputri 68
8. Djoko Suyanto 67
9. Gita Wirjawan 66
10. Chairul Tanjung 66
11. Endriartono Sutarto 66
12. Hatta Rajasa 66
13. Surya Paloh 64
14. Pramono Edhie Wibowo 64
15. Sukarwo 63
16. Prabowo Subianto 61
17. Puan Maharani 61
18. Ani Yudhoyono 60

In this LSI survey Endriartono is ranked 11th with a total score of 66. Commenting on the survey result, Endriartono said,” I thank all respondents (of the survey). It is definitely a challenge to realize those expectations,".

On 25 January 2013, National Democratic Party organized a congress during which cofounder Surya Paloh was unanimously elected party chairman to serve 2012–2017 term. The congress also mandated Surya Paloh, as elected chairman, to compose a new line up of party executives, aimed at winning the legislative election in 2014. On 8 February, Surya Paloh announced the new composition of Nasdem Party executive that included Endriartono Sutarto as chairman for its consultative council.

== Controversies ==
Endriartono Sutarto's decision to tender his post as TNI chief before his tenure completed came as a surprise for many. In October 2004, TNI Headquarters in Cilangkap confirmed the resignation and cited three conditions that Endriartono requested. TNI said in the letter submitted to then president Megawati Soekarnoputri Endriarto cited first the need for significant reorganization inside TNI, age factor (Endriartono's retirement had been extended for two years), and a successor from one of his chiefs of staff.

After he retired, Endriartono took up a commissioner position at state oil company Pertamina but resigned shortly after. It was said that it was discomforting for Endriartono to receive a huge amount of monthly salary from the company while he did not do much to earn it.

"I resigned my position in Pertamina because I saw how Pertamina did not deliver its best service to the public. Although it is a profit-oriented company, it does not mean that it solely seeks profits since it manages natural resources that are strategic for public needs." said Endriartono.

Air Force Marshal (Ret.) Chappy Hakim believed that the decision was made because Endriartono's principles and values that he clung to collided with what he found inside the company once known as one of the most corrupt state enterprises.

== Awards ==
Right chest
Left chest

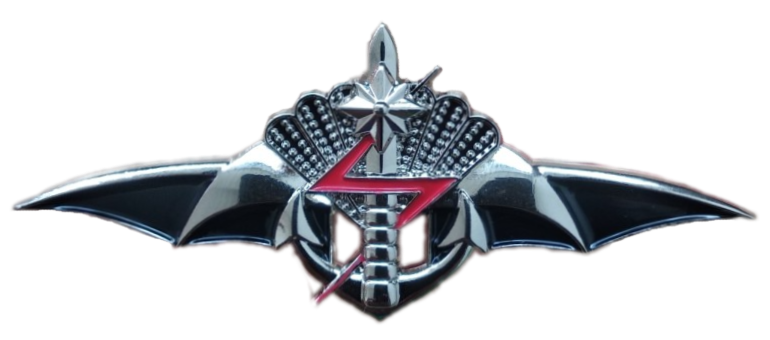

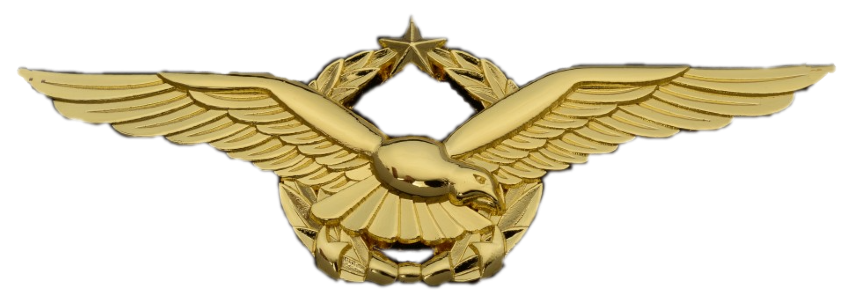
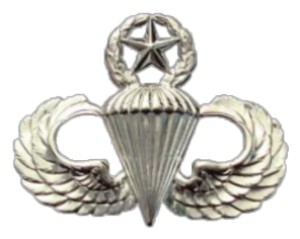
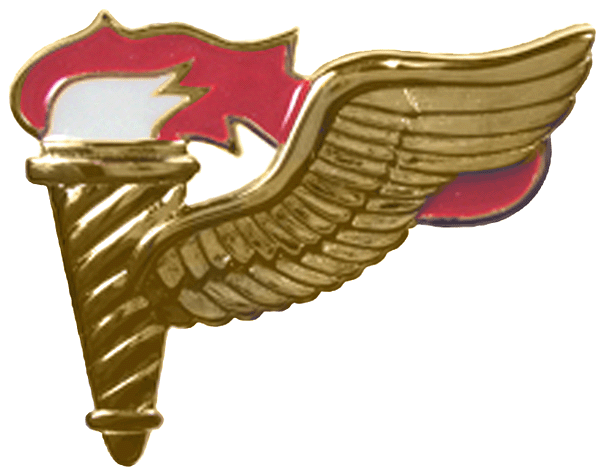

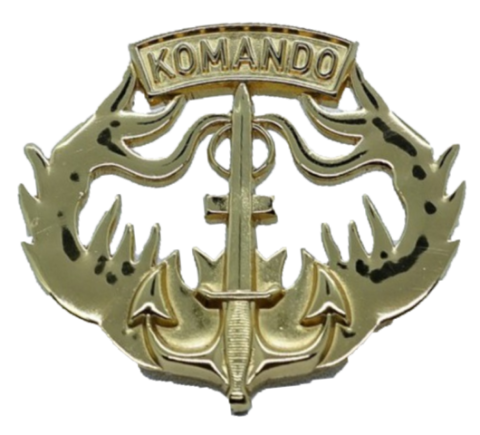
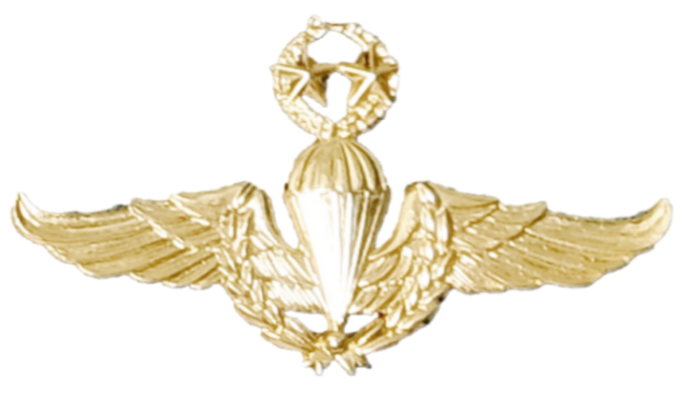

Amphibious Reconnaissance Qualification Brevet (Taifib) Marine Corps
Brevet Denjaka
Indonesian Air Force Aviation Wing
Master Parachutist Badge (US Army)	Pathfinder Badge (US Army)

Brevet	Command Qualification Brevet Kopassus			
Brevet	Paramount Brevet			
1st row	Star of Mahaputera, 2nd Class (Bintang Mahaputera Adipradana) (9 August 2005)	Star of Service, 1st Class (Bintang Jasa Utama) (28 February 2003)	Military Distinguished Service Star (Bintang Dharma)	Grand Meritorious Military Order Star, 1st Class (Bintang Yudha Dharma Utama)
2nd row	Army Meritorious Service Star, 1st Class (Bintang Kartika Eka Paksi Utama)	Navy Meritorious Service Star, 1st Class (Bintang Jalasena Utama)	Air Force Meritorious Service Star, 1st Class (Bintang Swa Bhuwana Paksa Utama)	National Police Meritorious Service Star, 1st Class (Bintang Bhayangkara Utama)
3rd row	First Class of the Order of Paduka Keberanian Laila Terbilang (D.P.K.T.) – Brunei	Courageous Commander of the Most Gallant Order of Military Service (P.G.A.T.) – Malaysia (24 September 2002)	Darjah Utama Bakti Cemerlang – Tentera (D.U.B.C.) – Singapore (3 February 2004)	Grand Cross of the Royal Order of Sahametrei – Cambodia (2005)
4th row	Knight Grand Cross of the Most Exalted Order of the White Elephant – Thailand	Pingat Jasa Gemilang - Tentera (P.J.G.) – Singapore	Order of National Security Merit – 1st Class (Tong-il Medal) – South Korea	Knight Grand Cross of the Most Noble Order of the Crown of Thailand – Thailand
5th row	Grand Meritorious Military Order Star, 2nd Class (Bintang Yudha Dharma Pratama)	Army Meritorious Service Star, 2nd Class (Bintang Kartika Eka Paksi Pratama)	Grand Meritorious Military Order Star, 3rd Class (Bintang Yudha Dharma Naraya)	Army Meritorious Service Star, 3rd Class (Bintang Kartika Eka Paksi Naraya)
6th row	Armed Forces Long Service Medal for 24 years (Satyalancana Kesetiaan selama 24 tahun pengabdian)	Satyalancana Gerakan Operasi Militer VII	Satyalancana Gerakan Operasi Militer IX	Timor Military Campaign Medal (Satyalancana Seroja)
7th row	Satyalancana Wira Karya	Satyalancana Santi Dharma	Second United Nations Emergency Force (UNEF II) Medal	United Nations Iran–Iraq Military Observer Group (UNIIMOG) Medal

== Notes ==
Military offices
Preceded by Widodo Adi Sutjipto	Commander of the Indonesian Armed Forces; 2002–2006	Succeeded by Djoko Suyanto
