= Umar Wirahadikusumah =

Vice President of Indonesia from 1983 to 1988

- Official portrait, 1983

4th Vice President of Indonesia
- In office 11 March 1983 – 11 March 1988
- President: Suharto
- Preceded by: Adam Malik
- Succeeded by: Sudharmono

8th Chair of the Audit Board of Indonesia
- In office 1973–1983
- President: Suharto
- Preceded by: Dadang Suprayogi
- Succeeded by: Mohammad Jusuf

9th Chief of Staff of the Indonesian Army
- In office 25 November 1969 – 27 April 1973
- President: Suharto
- Preceded by: General Maraden Panggabean
- Succeeded by: General Surono Reksodimedjo

2nd Commander of Kostrad
- In office 2 December 1965 – 27 May 1967
- President: Sukarno; Suharto (acting)
- Preceded by: Maj. Gen. Suharto
- Succeeded by: Maj. Gen. Kemal Idris

Personal details
- Born: 10 October 1924 Soemedang, West-Java, Dutch East Indies
- Died: 21 March 2003 (aged 78) Jakarta, Indonesia
- Resting place: Kalibata Heroes' Cemetery
- Party: Golkar
- Spouse: Karlinah Djaja Atmadja (m. 1957)
- Relations: Agus Wirahadikusumah (nephew)
- Children: 2
- Occupation: Politician; army officer

Military service
- Allegiance: Indonesia
- Branch/service: Indonesian Army
- Years of service: 1945–1973
- Rank: General
- Unit: Infantry (Kostrad)
- Commands: Kodam Jaya; Kostrad
- Battles/wars: Indonesian National Revolution; Madiun Affair; Darul Islam rebellion; PRRI rebellion
- Service no.: 13761

Umar Wirahadikusumah (10 October 1924 – 21 March 2003) was an Indonesian general and politician who served as the fourth vice president of Indonesia from 1983 until 1988, under president Suharto. He was previously chairman of the Audit Board of Indonesia from 1973 until 1983 and chief of staff of the Indonesian Army from 1969 until 1973.

Born to a noble Sundanese family, he was educated at the Europeesche Lagere School Tasikmalaya and Meer Uitgebreid Lager Onderwijs Pasundan. He entered the military in 1943, during the Japanese occupation. He would go on to serve in the Indonesian Army during and after the Indonesian National Revolution, seeing combat in the Madiun Affair and the PRRI rebellion. After hearing about the kidnapping of six Generals and seeing unidentified troops occupying the Merdeka Square, Umar sent word to Kostrad Commander, Major General Suharto of the events that had just unfolded and requested his assistance. Umar accepted Suharto's decision to assume command of the Army and supported him in his efforts to crack down on the attempted coup, gaining great trust from Suharto. In 1967, Umar became Deputy Army Chief of Staff before finally becoming the Army Chief of Staff himself in 1969. In 1973, his active military career came to an end and he became the Chairman of the State Audit Board (BPK), a position which he would hold until 1983.

In 1983, he was selected by Suharto to become vice president, a choice considered rather unexpected. As vice president, he combated corruption and held prayer services at the vice presidential palace. His term as vice president ended in March 1988 when he was replaced by Sudharmono. He died on 21 March 2003, due to heart and lung problems. His body was interred at the Kalibata Heroes' Cemetery, Jakarta.

== Early life and education ==
Umar Wirahadikusumah was born in Situraja, Sumedang, West Java on 10 October 1924, to a noble family. His father, Raden Rangga Wirahadikusumah, was the Wedana of Ciawi, and Tasikmalaya. While his mother, Raden Ratnaringrum, was the daughter of Patih Demang Kartamenda in Bandung. His brothers were Hasan, Sadikin (d. 2004), Mohammad, and Achmad Wirahadikusumah. Umar's mother died when he was a child, and he and his siblings were cared for by his grandmother, Nyi Raja Juwita, who at that time lived in Cicalengka. After his grandmother died, his father took him to Ciawi. While in Cicalengka, Umar entered kindergarten and elementary school at Hollandsch-Inlandsche School. He continued his education at the Europeesche Lagere School Tasikmalaya and Meer Uitgebreid Lager Onderwijs Pasundan, and he completed his education.

== Military service ==
=== Pre-independence ===
In 1943, with Indonesia now under Japanese Occupation, Umar enlisted with youth groups operating under the supervision of the Japanese Occupational Government. These youth groups provided some physical training which Umar undertook. This was followed in October 1944 by PETA, an auxiliary force consisting of Indonesian recruits that was intended to assist the Japanese in fighting the Allies. When Indonesia declared its Independence, Umar, like many other youths of similar age joined the TKR (People's Security Army), the forerunner to the TNI.

After the Indonesian National Revolution in which the fledgling nation successfully prevented the Dutch from reoccupying them, Umar served in the Army. Umar served for a long time in Kodam VI/Siliwangi (Siliwangi Division) which was stationed in his native province of West Java. He worked his way up the ranks, participating in a crackdown of the Communists in 1948 as well as fighting the PRRI rebellion in Sumatra. He was also at one time, the adjutant of AH Nasution when the latter held the position of Kodam VI/Siliwangi Commander.

=== Post-independence ===
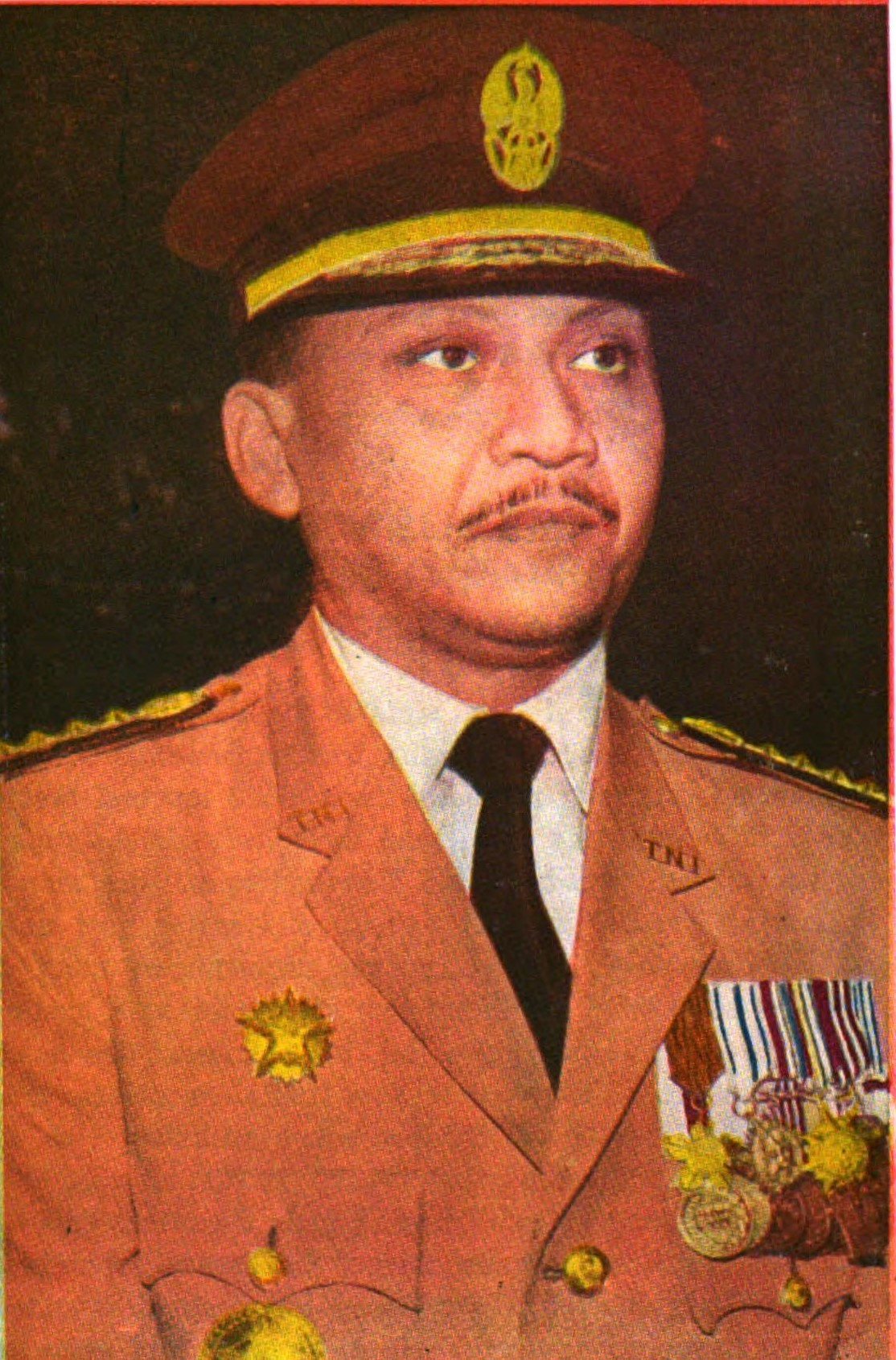
Umar Wirahadikusumah as the Chief of Staff of the Indonesian Army

In 1959, Umar was trusted as the Commander of Kodam V/Jaya and he was now in charge of security around Jakarta. On the morning of 1 October 1965, six Generals were kidnapped from their houses. As the Commander of Kodam V/Jaya, Umar went around the city to check its security. After hearing about the kidnappings and seeing the unidentified troops occupying the Merdeka Square, Umar sent word to Kostrad Commander, Major General Suharto of the events that had just unfolded and requested his assistance.

Umar accepted Suharto's decision to assume command of the Army and supported him in his efforts to crack down on the attempted coup. Towards midday, Umar received a summon from President Sukarno who was suspicious at Halim Perdanakusuma Airport, the place where the six Generals were taken. Suharto was worried that this was an attempt to get Umar to Halim and have him killed. Suharto firmly rejected the order. As Suharto retook control of the situation in Jakarta, Umar further consolidated it. He declared a curfew between 6 pm and 6 am and placed a watch on all of the city's newspapers.

When blame for the incident was beginning to be put on the Indonesian Communist Party (PKI), Umar approved of the formation of the Union of Action To Exterminate The 30 September Movement (KAP-GESTAPU), leading to the mass killing of an estimated half a million people in 1965–1966. Although he was not part of Suharto's inner circle, Umar won great trust from Suharto for the assistance and support given in putting down the 30 September Movement. As Suharto began a rise which would see him end up as President of Indonesia, Umar's career also skyrocketed. In 1965, Suharto entrusted Umar to replace him as Commander of Kostrad. In 1967, Umar became Deputy Army Chief of Staff before finally becoming the Army Chief of Staff himself in 1969. In 1973, his active military career came to an end and he became the Chairman of the State Audit Board (BPK), a position which he would hold for 10 years. As Chairman of BPK, Umar was responsible for making sure that Government Departments, Ministries, and Agencies were using their money properly. During his tenure as Chairman of BPK, Umar made the grim assessment that not even one Government department was free from corruption.

== Vice presidency (1983–1988) ==
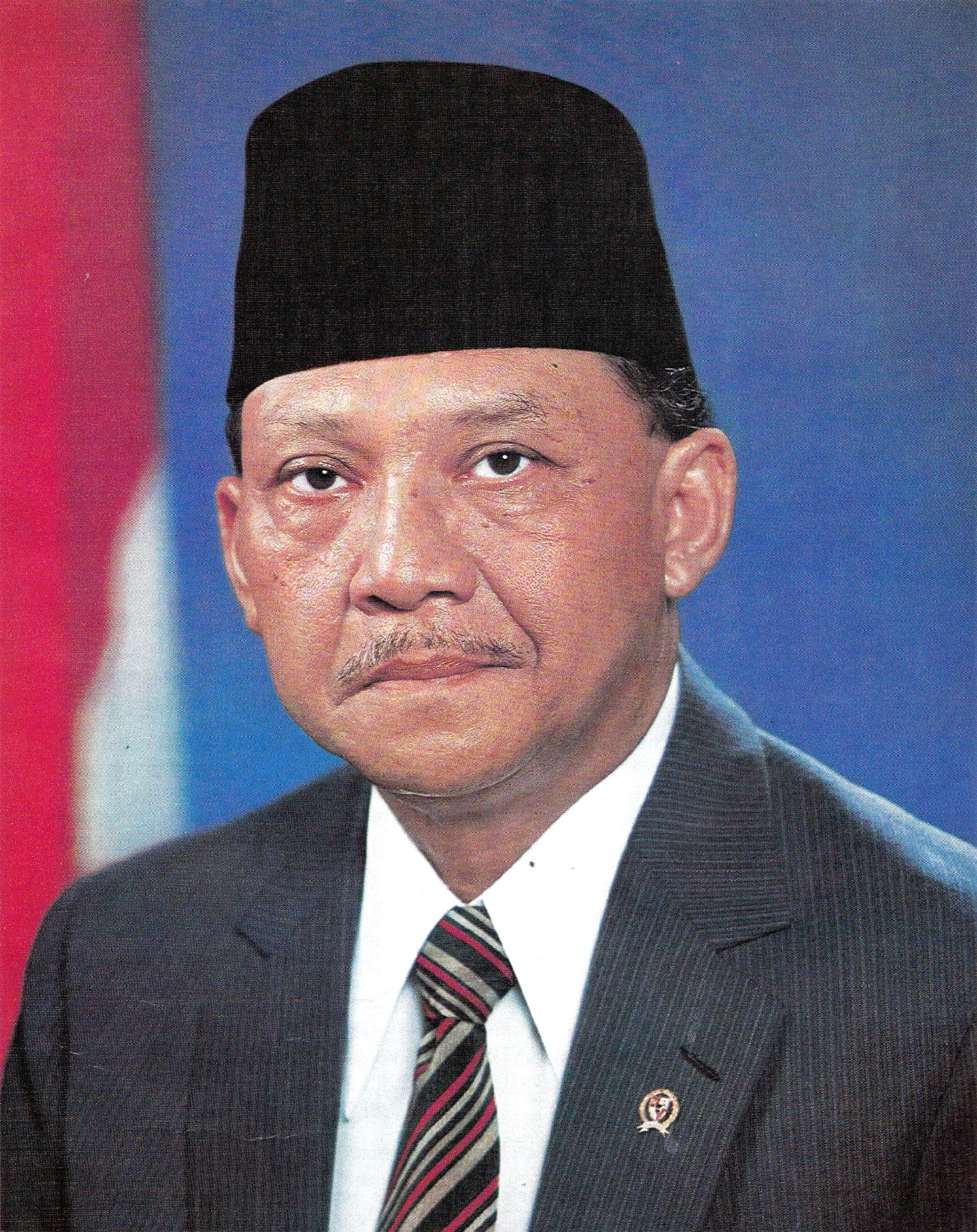
A different version of his official portrait as vice president

In March 1983, Umar reached the pinnacle of his career. Suharto, who had been elected for a 4th term as president by the People's Consultative Assembly (MPR) selected Umar to be his vice president. This was considered to be a rather unexpected choice as Umar's stature in Indonesian politics paled in comparison to his two predecessors, Hamengkubuwono IX and Adam Malik. Despite being a low-key personality, Umar had a good reputation and was widely respected.

As vice president, Umar became one of the very few in the Suharto regime who chose to combat corruption. As a religious man, Umar had hoped that religion could be used to turn corruptors to do the right deeds. Umar also conducted surprise inspections (sometimes incognito) of regional towns and villages to monitor how government policies were affecting the people. During his vice presidency, Umar also held prayer services at the Vice Presidential Palace. Umar's term as vice president ended in March 1988 when he was replaced by Sudharmono. Many were disappointed to see him not continue for a second term as vice president. It was a testament to his good reputation that Sudharmono wanted to be sure of Umar's acceptance to not continue as vice president for another term.

== Post-vice presidency (1988–2003) ==
In May 1998, on the eve of Suharto's fall, Umar, together with Sudharmono and Try Sutrisno visited Suharto at his residence to discuss possible options. Umar died on 21 March 2003 due to heart and lung problems at 7:53 pm. at the Central Army Hospital (RSPAD) Gatot Subroto. He was interred at the Kalibata Heroes' Cemetery, Jakarta.

== Personal life ==
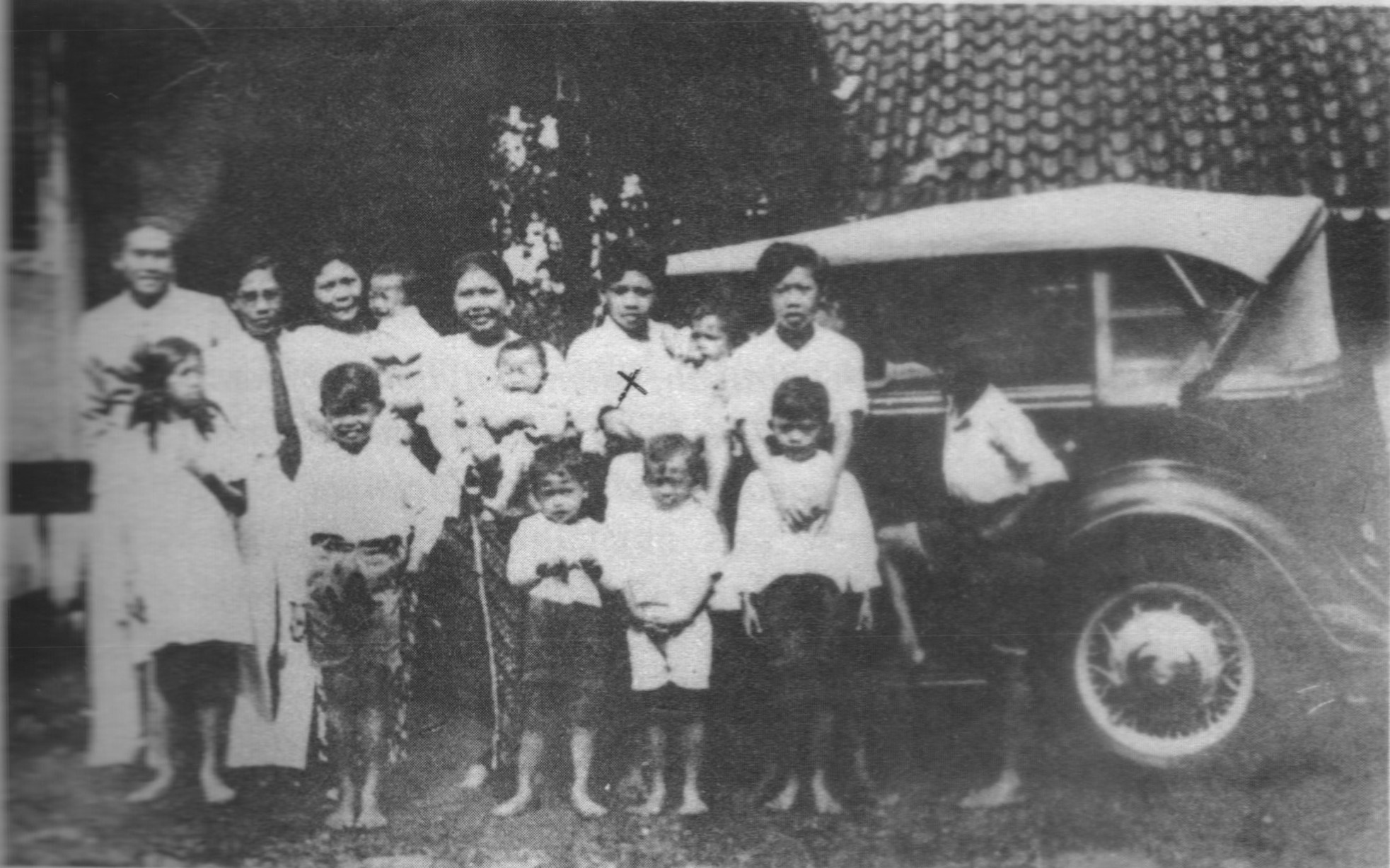
Umar Wirahadikusmah with his family, c. 1938

Umar married Karlinah Djaja Atmadja on 2 February 1957, with whom he had two daughters. Umar was also the uncle of Agus Wirahadikusumah, a reformist military officer who himself became Commander of Kostrad. His brother, Sadikin, was the father of Reini Wirahadikusumah, rector of Bandung Institute of Technology from 2020 until 2025 and was the first woman to hold the position.

== Honours ==
=== National honours ===
The following is a list of awards awarded to Umar by the Indonesian government:

- Star of the Republic of Indonesia, 2nd Class (Indonesian: Bintang Republik Indonesia Adipradana) (12 March 1983)
- Star of Mahaputera, 2nd Class (Indonesian: Bintang Mahaputera Adipradana) (19 May 1973)
- Military Distinguished Service Star (Indonesian: Bintang Dharma)
- Guerrilla Star (Indonesian: Bintang Gerilya)
- Star of Kartika Eka Paksi, 1st Class (Indonesian: Bintang Kartika Eka Paksi Utama)
- Star of Jalasena, 1st Class (Indonesian: Bintang Jalasena Utama)
- Star of Bhayangkara, 1st Class (Indonesian: Bintang Bhayangkara Utama)
- Star of Kartika Eka Paksi, 2nd Class (Indonesian: Bintang Kartika Eka Paksi Pratama)
- Star of Jalasena, 2nd Class (Indonesian: Bintang Jalasena Pratama)
- Star of Bhayangkara, 2nd Class (Indonesian: Bintang Bhayangkara Pratama)
- Star of Kartika Eka Paksi, 3rd Class (Indonesian: Bintang Kartika Eka Paksi Nararya)
- Indonesian Armed Forces "8 Years" Service Star (Indonesian: Bintang Sewindu Angkatan Perang Republik Indonesia)
- Military Long Service Medal, 24 Years Service (Indonesian: Satyalancana Kesetiaan XXIV Tahun)
- 1st Independence War Medal (Indonesian: Satyalancana Perang Kemerdekaan I)
- 2nd Independence War Medal (Indonesian: Satyalancana Perang Kemerdekaan II)
- Military Operational Service Medal for Madiun 1947 (Indonesian: Satyalancana G.O.M I)
- Military Operational Service Medal for Angkatan Ratu Adil 1947 (Indonesian: Satyalancana G.O.M II)
- Military Operational Service Medal for Jawa Barat 1959 (Indonesian: Satyalancana G.O.M V)
- "Sapta Marga" Medal (Indonesian: Satyalancana Sapta Marga)
- Northern Borneo Military Campaign Medal (Indonesian: Satyalancana Wira Dharma)
- Medal for Combat Against Communists (Indonesian: Satyalancana Penegak)
- Military Instructor Service Medal (Indonesian: Satyalancana Dwidya Sistha)

=== Foreign honours ===
The following is a list of awards awarded to Umar by foreign governments:

- France
  - Grand Cross of the National Order of Merit
- Germany:
  - Grand Cross of the Order of Merit of the Federal Republic of Germany
- Jordan
  - Grand Cordon with Brilliants of the Supreme Order of the Renaissance
- Malaysia :
  - Honorary Commander of the Order of Loyalty to the Crown of Malaysia (P.S.M.) (1972)
- Netherlands:
  - Knight Grand Cross of the Order of Orange-Nassau
- South Korea:
  - First Class (Tong-il) of the Order of National Security Merit
- United States:
  - Commander of the Legion of Merit
- Yugoslavia:
  - Second Rank of the Order of the People's Army with Golden Star

Political offices
Preceded by Adam Malik	Vice President of Indonesia; 11 March 1983 – 11 March 1988	Succeeded by Sudharmono
