= Kostrad =

Military unit in Indonesia

Army Strategic Reserve Command
- Komando Cadangan Strategis Angkatan Darat
- Insignia of Kostrad, inspired from the Chakra wheel
- Active: 1961–present
- Country: Indonesia
- Branch: (yes) Indonesian Army
- Type: Infantry, Strategic Defense
- Role: Army Combined Arms; Land Warfare; Rapid Deployment Force
- Size: 3 Divisions
- Part of: Indonesian National Armed Forces
- Headquarters: Gambir, Jakarta
- Nickname: "Chakra"
- Mottos: Yudha Nirbaya Bhakti ("Fearless at war by devotion")
- Beret color: Green
- Anniversaries: 6 March

Commanders
- Commander: Lieutenant General Mohammad Fadjar
- Chief of Staff: Major General Ilyas Alamsyah Harahap
- Inspector: Major General Choirul Anam

The Army Strategic Reserve Command (Indonesian: Komando Cadangan Strategis Angkatan Darat; abbreviated Kostrad) is a combined-arms formation of the Indonesian Army. Kostrad is a Corps level command which has up to 35,000 troops. It also supervises operational readiness among all commands and conducts defence and security operations at the strategic level in accordance with policies under the command of the commander of the Indonesian National Armed Forces. In contrast to its name ("Reserve"), Kostrad is the main warfare combat unit of the Indonesian Army. While Kopassus is the elite-special forces of the Indonesian Army, Kostrad as "Komando Utama Operasi" or "Principal Operational Command" still maintains as the first-line combat formation of the Indonesian National Armed Forces along with the Kopassus.

As a corps, Kostrad is commanded by a Panglima Kostrad (Pangkostrad), usually a lieutenant general. Kostrad falls under the army chief of staff for training, personnel, and administration. However, it comes under the Commander-in-Chief of the Indonesian National Armed Forces for operational command and deployment due to the status of Kostrad as one of the principal operation commands. Kostrad typically receives best equipment in the Army and its two armoured battalions received Leopard 2A4 and Leopard 2 Revolution tanks.

Starting 1984 the Panglima Kostrad (Pangkostrad) has been charged to lead the conduct of combat operations, called defence and security operations.

== History ==
Kostrad came into being during military action for Indonesia's take over of Western New Guinea in 1960, and was formally constituted on 6 March 1961. Initially designated the Army General Reserve Corps (Cadangan Umum Angkatan Darat), its name was changed to Kostrad in 1963.

General Suharto, was appointed as the first head of Kostrad in 1961, and it was in this role that he was able to assert the army's control in the days following the alleged coup attempt on the evening of 30 September and dawn of 1 October 1965, which ultimately led to Suharto replacing Sukarno as Indonesian president.

The command's troops have fought in most Indonesian military operations since their formation, such as the purge of communists and "alleged communists", including the Operation Trident (Indonesian: Operasi Trisula), the PGRS (Sarawak People's Guerrilla Force) in Sarawak and the PARAKU (North Kalimantan People's Force) in Kalimantan. It also involved in Operation Lotus (Indonesian: Operasi Seroja) in the then-Portuguese Timor.

Kostrad troops have also been used beyond Indonesia's borders, as was the case with Garuda Contingent in Egypt (1973–78) and South Vietnam (1973–75) and with those in the United Nations Iran–Iraq Military Observer Group in the midst of the Iran–Iraq War of 1989 and 1990.

== Function and main tasks ==
Kostrad Headquarters in Central Jakarta

Based on the Decree of the Armed Forces Commander Number: Kep / 09 / III / 1985 dated 6 March 1985 on the Principles of Organization and the task of the Strategic Command of the Armed Forces (Kostrad), it is stipulated that Kostrad as a major Administrative Command reports directly under the office of Chief of Staff of the Army while as a Principal Operational Command it is directly under the commander of the Indonesian National Armed Forces. Kostrad was principally responsible for fostering operational readiness on all of its command lines and conducting Strategic Defense Security Operations in accordance with the policy of the Commander of the National Armed Forces. To carry out these tasks, Kostrad organizes and carries out the main functions in the development of strength, combat and administration, the military's organic functions both intelligence, operations and training, personnel mentoring, logistics, and territorial activities as well as the organic function of coaching and mentoring in planning, controlling and supervision.

In the organizational field, Kostrad has an organizational structure established by the Chief of Staff of the Army based on the CSA Decree Regulation No. Kep / 9 / III / 85 dated 6 March 1985. Kostrad is headed by a Lieutenant-General who serves as the Commanding General of the Kostrad. In the daily duties of the Army Commander, he is assisted by a Chief of Staff of the Kostrad bearing the rank of Major General, the auxiliary elements of the Staff, namely Personal Staff, Kostrad Inspectorate, and Kostrad General Staff, the Assistant Chief of Staff who served as the supervisor of the execution of their respective activities as required by law. While the executive elements in Kostrad under the purview of the Commanding General consist of the Executive Units, combat units, and Combat support units.

== Strength ==
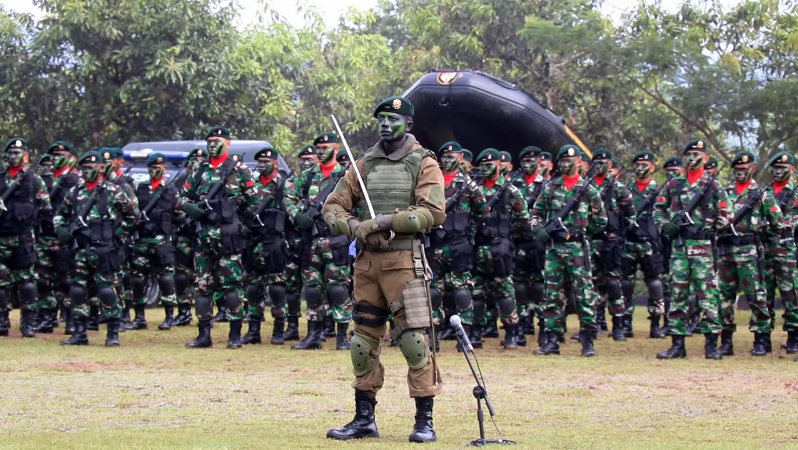
Kostrad soldiers line up in formation during parade

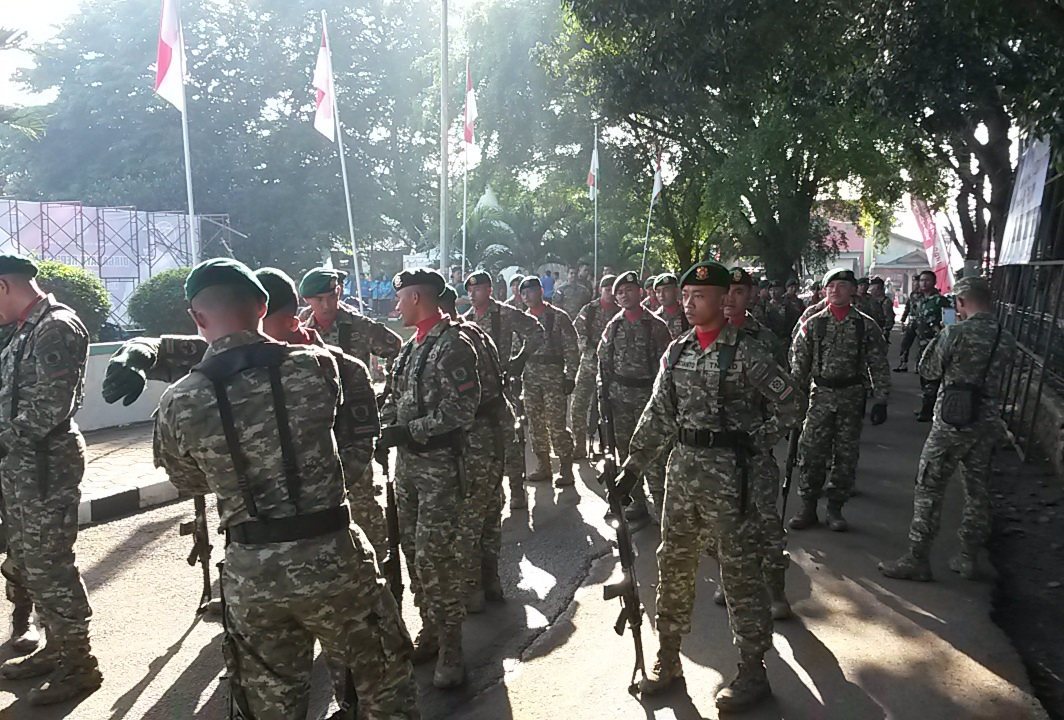
Kostrad soldiers with their distinctive camouflage-pattern uniform

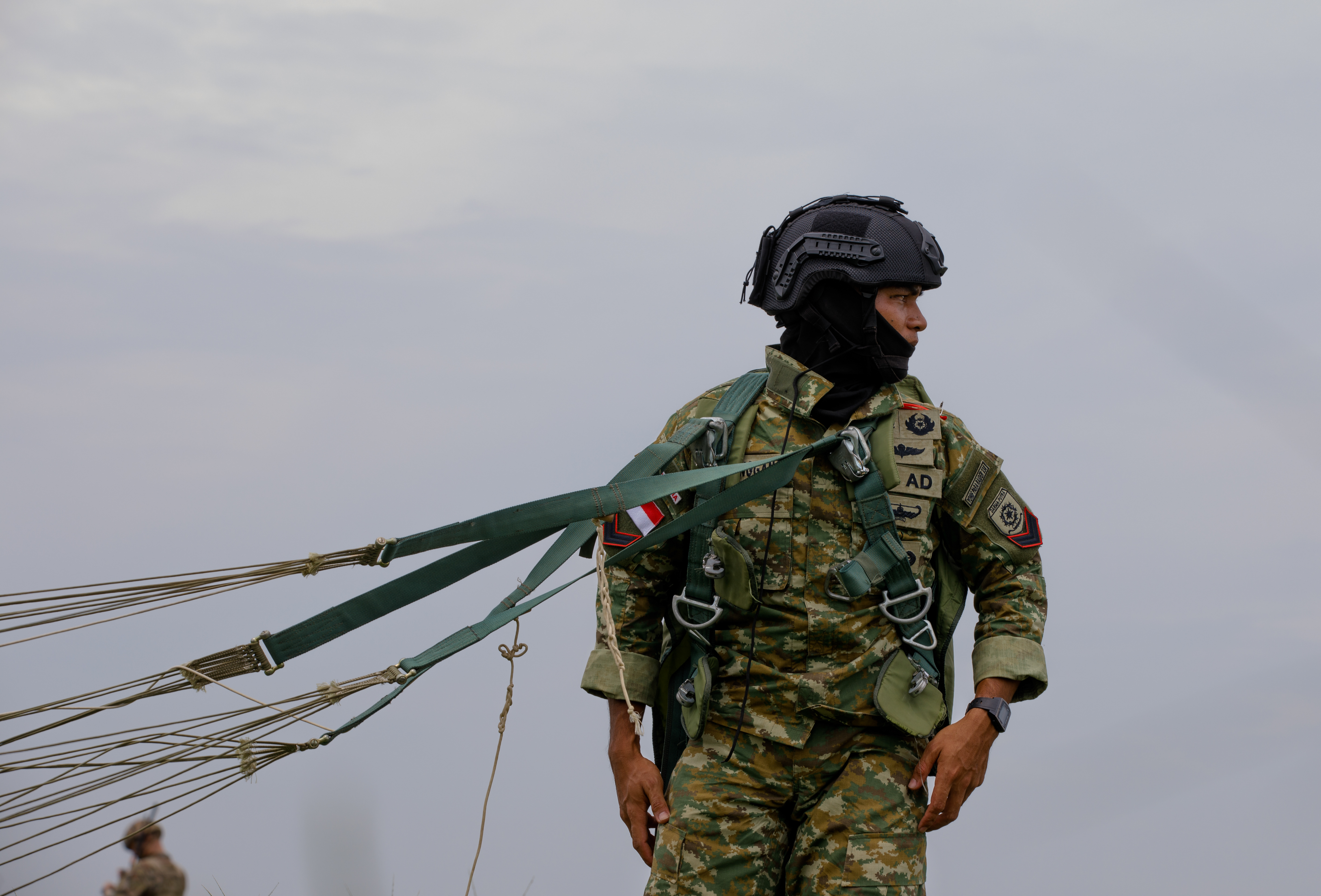
A Kostrad paratrooper during exercise Super Garuda Shield 2024.

Kostrad had a strength of 32,000 in 2017 and its primary components consist of three infantry divisions and an independent airborne brigade.

There were as of early 1998 a total of 33 airborne and infantry battalions within Kostrad. Each division contained three infantry and/or airborne brigades; an armoured battalion; cavalry reconnaissance company; field artillery regiment of three battalions; air defence artillery battalion; combat engineer battalion; supply and transportation battalion; medical battalion; signal company; military police company; field maintenance company; and a personnel and administrative detachment. Kostrad has 3 divisions which are:

Emblems	Official names	Establishment	Headquarters	Strength
	1st Infantry Division/Kostrad	December 1965	Cilodong, Depok, West Java	3 Infantry Brigades (13th, 14th, 17th); 9 Infantry Battalions; 1 Security Reconnaissance and Air Scout Detachment; 1 Field Artillery Regiment (1st); 3 Field Artillery Battalions (9th, 10th, 13th); 1 Air Defense Artillery Battalion (1st); 1 Cavalry Battalion (1st); 1 Combat Engineer Battalion (9th); 1 Supply and Transportation Battalion (1st); 1 Medical Battalion (1st); 1 Cavalry Company (1st)
	2nd Infantry Division/Kostrad	April 1961	Singosari, Malang, East Java	3 Infantry Brigades (6th, 9th, 18th); 9 Infantry Battalions; 1 Security Reconnaissance and Air Scout Detachment; 1 Field Artillery Regiment (2nd); 3 Field Artillery Battalions (1st, 11th, 12th); 1 Air Defense Artillery Battalion (2nd); 1 Cavalry Battalion (8th); 1 Combat Engineer Battalion (10th); 1 Supply and Transportation Battalion (2nd); 1 Medical Battalion (2nd); 1 Cavalry Company (8th)
	3rd Infantry Division/Kostrad	May 2018	Bontomarannu, Gowa, South Sulawesi	2 Infantry Brigades (3rd, 20th); 6 Infantry Battalions; 1 Security Reconnaissance and Air Scout Detachment; 1 Field Artillery Battalion (6th); 1 Air Defense Artillery Battalion (16th); 1 Cavalry Company (14th)

As of 1 August 2026, Kostrad has a total units of 3 Infantry Divisions, 11 Infantry Brigades, 24 Infantry Battalions, 3 Security Reconnaissance and Air Scout Detachment, 2 Cavalry Battalion, 3 Cavalry Company, 2 Field Artillery Regiment, 7 Field Artillery Battalions, 3 Air Defense Artillery Battalion, 2 Combat Engineer Battalion, 1 Satria Sandhi Yudha Battalion, 2 Medical Battalion, 2 Supply and Transportation Battalion.

== Special Unit ==
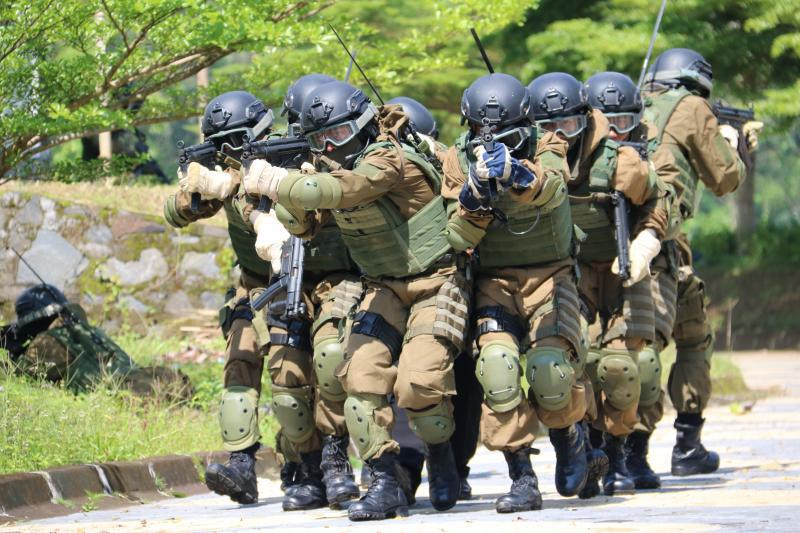
Kostrad Taipur operators

=== Combat Reconnaissance Platoon ===
The "Combat Reconnaissance Platoon" of Kostrad (Peleton Intai Tempur abbreviated "Tontaipur") is a special unit formation of Kostrad in a platoon level to conduct Special reconnaissance (SR) operations. Its further information regarding number of troops and weaponry are confidential. It was formed in 2001 and is part of the Kostrad Intelligence Battalion. Tontaipur was formed under the auspices of the then Kostrad commander Lt Gen Ryamizard Ryacudu. Similar to other special units within the Indonesian National Armed Forces, Tontaipur is trained for land, air and sea combat special operations.

== Commanders of Kostrad ==
Commander of Army Strategic Reserve Command is considered a path to obtaining a high government position in Indonesia. Many of its commanders have become very senior Indonesian leaders including Suharto and Prabowo, who became President; Rudini, who became Minister of Home Affairs; Wirahadikusumah, who would later become Vice-president; Ryamizard Ryacudu, who would become Chief of Staff of the Army and Minister of Defence; and numerous commanders who would later become Chief of Staff of the Army and later on as Commander of the Indonesian National Armed Forces.
