= Chief of Staff of the Indonesian Army =

Highest position in the Indonesian Army

- Kepala Staf TNI Angkatan Darat

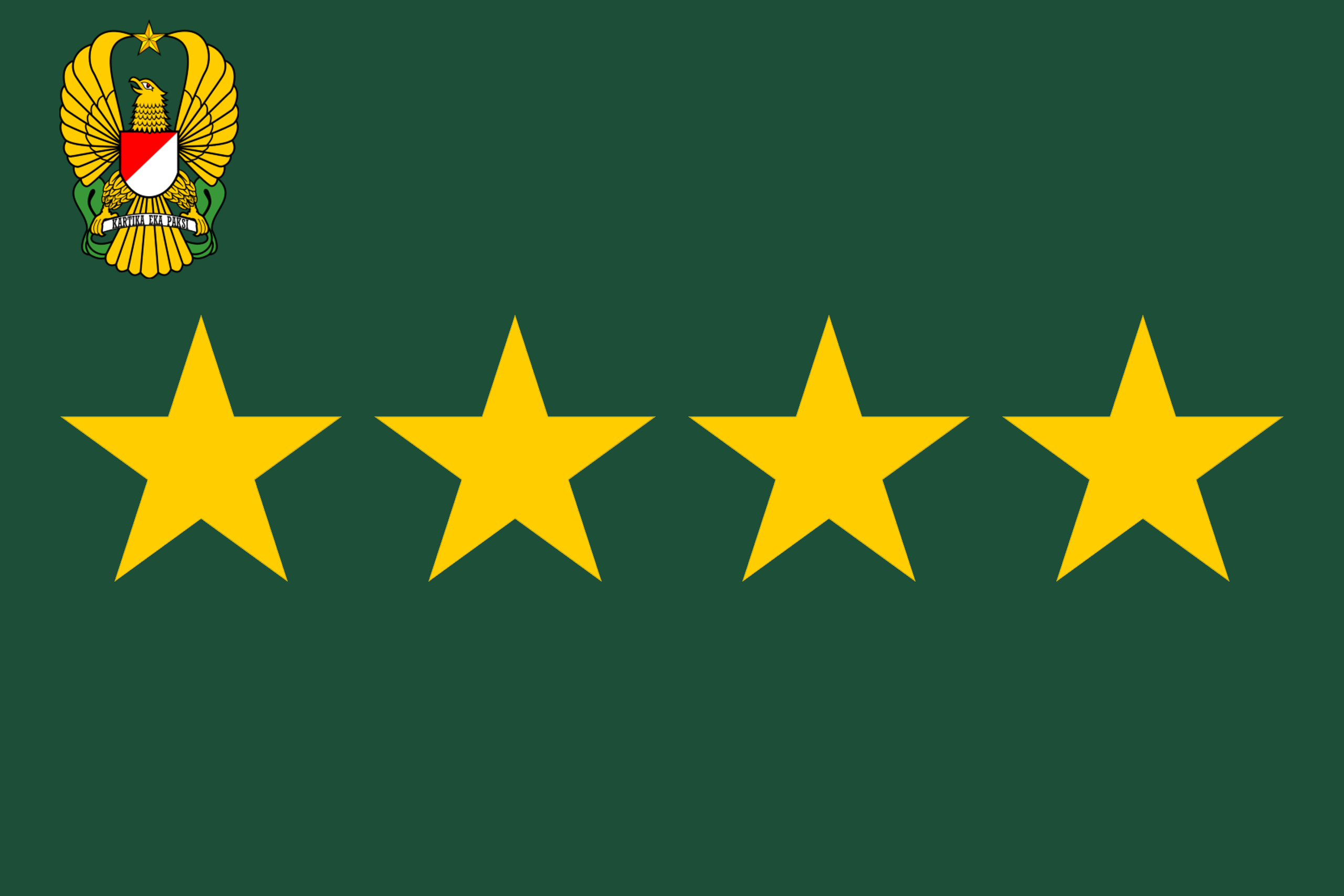
- Flag of the Chief of Staff

- Incumbent; General Tandyo Budi Revita since 15 October 2026
- Indonesian Army
- Abbreviation: KSAD / Kasad
- Reports to: Commander of the Indonesian National Armed Forces
- Seat: Army Headquarter, Gambir, Central Jakarta, Jakarta
- Nominator: Commander of Indonesian National Armed Forces
- Appointer: President of Indonesia
- Constituting instrument: President Decree No. 14 of 1948
- Precursor: Commander of Army Strategic Command
- Formation: 15 May 1948
- First holder: Colonel Djatikoesoemo
- Deputy: Vice Chief of Staff of the Indonesian Army

The Chief of Staff of the Indonesian Army (Indonesian: Kepala Staf TNI Angkatan Darat, abbreviated KSAD or KASAD) is the highest position in the Indonesian Army. The position is held by the four-star General appointed by and reporting directly to the Commander of the Armed Forces. Chief of Staff is assisted by the Vice Chief of Staff of the Indonesian Army, which is the position held by a three-star General.

The current officeholder is General Tandyo Budi Revita, who took office on 15 October 2026.

== List of officeholders ==
| No. | Portrait | Name (Birth–Death) | Term of office | | | Ref. |
| No. | Portrait | Name (Birth–Death) | Took office | Left office | Time in office | Ref. |
|---|---|---|---|---|---|---|
| 1 | | Colonel; Djatikoesoemo (1917–1992) | 15 May 1948 | 27 December 1949 | 1 year, 226 days | |
| 2 | | Colonel; Abdul Haris Nasution (1918–2000) | 27 December 1949 | 18 December 1952 | 2 years, 357 days | |
| 3 | | Major general Bambang Soegeng (1913–1977) | 18 December 1952 | 8 May 1955 | 2 years, 141 days | |
| – | | Colonel; Zulkifli Lubis (1923–1993); Acting | 8 May 1955 | 25 June 1955 | 48 days | |
| 4 | | Major general Bambang Utoyo (1920–1980) | 25 June 1955 | 28 October 1955 | 125 days | |
| 5 | | General; Abdul Haris Nasution (1918–2000) | 7 November 1955 | 21 June 1962 | 6 years, 226 days | |
| 6 | | Lieutenant general Ahmad Yani (1922–1965) | 21 June 1962 | 1 October 1965 † | 3 years, 102 days | |
| – | | Major general Pranoto Reksosamudro (1923–1993); Acting | 2 October 1965 | 16 October 1965 | 14 days | |
| 7 | | General; Suharto (1921–2008) | 16 October 1965 | 1 May 1968 | 2 years, 198 days | |
| 8 | | General; Maraden Panggabean (1922–2000) | 1 May 1968 | 25 November 1969 | 1 year, 208 days | |
| 9 | | General; Umar Wirahadikusumah (1924–2003) | 25 November 1969 | 27 April 1973 | 3 years, 153 days | |
| 10 | | General; Surono Reksodimedjo (1923–2010) | 27 April 1973 | 10 May 1974 | 1 year, 13 days | |
| 11 | | General; Makmun Murod (1924–2011) | 10 May 1974 | 1 January 1978 | 3 years, 236 days | |
| 12 | | General; Raden Widodo (1924–1993) | 1 January 1978 | 30 April 1980 | 2 years, 120 days | |
| 13 | | General; Poniman (1926–2010) | 30 April 1980 | 1 March 1983 | 2 years, 305 days | |
| 14 | | General; Rudini (1929–2006) | 1 March 1983 | 7 June 1986 | 3 years, 98 days | |
| 15 | | General; Try Sutrisno (1935–2026) | 7 June 1986 | 2 February 1988 | 1 year, 240 days | |
| 16 | | General; Edi Sudradjat (1938–2006) | 2 February 1988 | 23 March 1993 | 5 years, 49 days | |
| 17 | | General; Wismoyo Arismunandar (1940–2021) | 23 March 1993 | 8 February 1995 | 1 year, 322 days | |
| 18 | | General; Raden Hartono (born 1941) | 8 February 1995 | 7 June 1997 | 2 years, 119 days | |
| 19 | | General; Wiranto (born 1947) | 7 June 1997 | 16 February 1998 | 254 days | |
| 20 | | General; Subagyo Hadi Siswoyo (1946–2026) | 16 February 1998 | 20 November 1999 | 1 year, 277 days | |
| 21 | | General; Tyasno Sudarto (born 1948) | 20 November 1999 | 9 October 2000 | 324 days | |
| 22 | | General; Endriartono Sutarto (born 1947) | 9 October 2000 | 4 June 2002 | 1 year, 238 days | |
| 23 | | General; Ryamizard Ryacudu (1950–2026) | 4 June 2002 | 18 February 2005 | 2 years, 259 days | |
| 24 | | General; Djoko Santoso (1952–2020) | 18 February 2005 | 28 December 2007 | 2 years, 313 days | |
| 25 | | General; Agustadi Sasongko Purnomo (born 1952) | 28 December 2007 | 9 November 2009 | 1 year, 316 days | |
| 26 | | General; George Toisutta (1953–2019) | 9 November 2009 | 30 June 2011 | 1 year, 233 days | |
| 27 | | General; Pramono Edhie Wibowo (1955–2020) | 30 June 2011 | 20 May 2013 | 1 year, 324 days | |
| 28 | | General; Moeldoko (born 1957) | 20 May 2013 | 30 August 2013 | 102 days | |
| 29 | | General; Budiman (born 1956) | 30 August 2013 | 25 July 2014 | 329 days | |
| 30 | | General; Gatot Nurmantyo (born 1960) | 25 July 2014 | 15 July 2015 | 355 days | |
| 31 | | General; Mulyono (born 1961) | 15 July 2015 | 22 November 2018 | 3 years, 130 days | |
| 32 | | General; Andika Perkasa (born 1964) | 22 November 2018 | 17 November 2021 | 2 years, 360 days | |
| 33 | | General; Dudung Abdurachman (born 1965) | 17 November 2021 | 25 October 2023 | 1 year, 342 days | |
| 34 | | General; Agus Subiyanto (born 1967) | 25 October 2023 | 29 November 2023 | 35 days | |
| 35 | | General; Maruli Simanjuntak (born 1970) | 29 November 2023 | 15 October 2026 | 2 years, 320 days | |
| 36 | | General; Tandyo Budi Revita (born 1969) | 15 October 2026 | Incumbent | 29 days | |

== See also ==
- Commander of the Indonesian National Armed Forces
- Deputy Commander of the Indonesian National Armed Forces
- Chief of Staff of the Indonesian Navy
- Chief of Staff of the Indonesian Air Force
