= Commander of the Indonesian National Armed Forces =

Highest position in the Indonesian National Armed Forces

- Panglima Tentara Nasional Indonesia
- Insignia of the Armed Forces

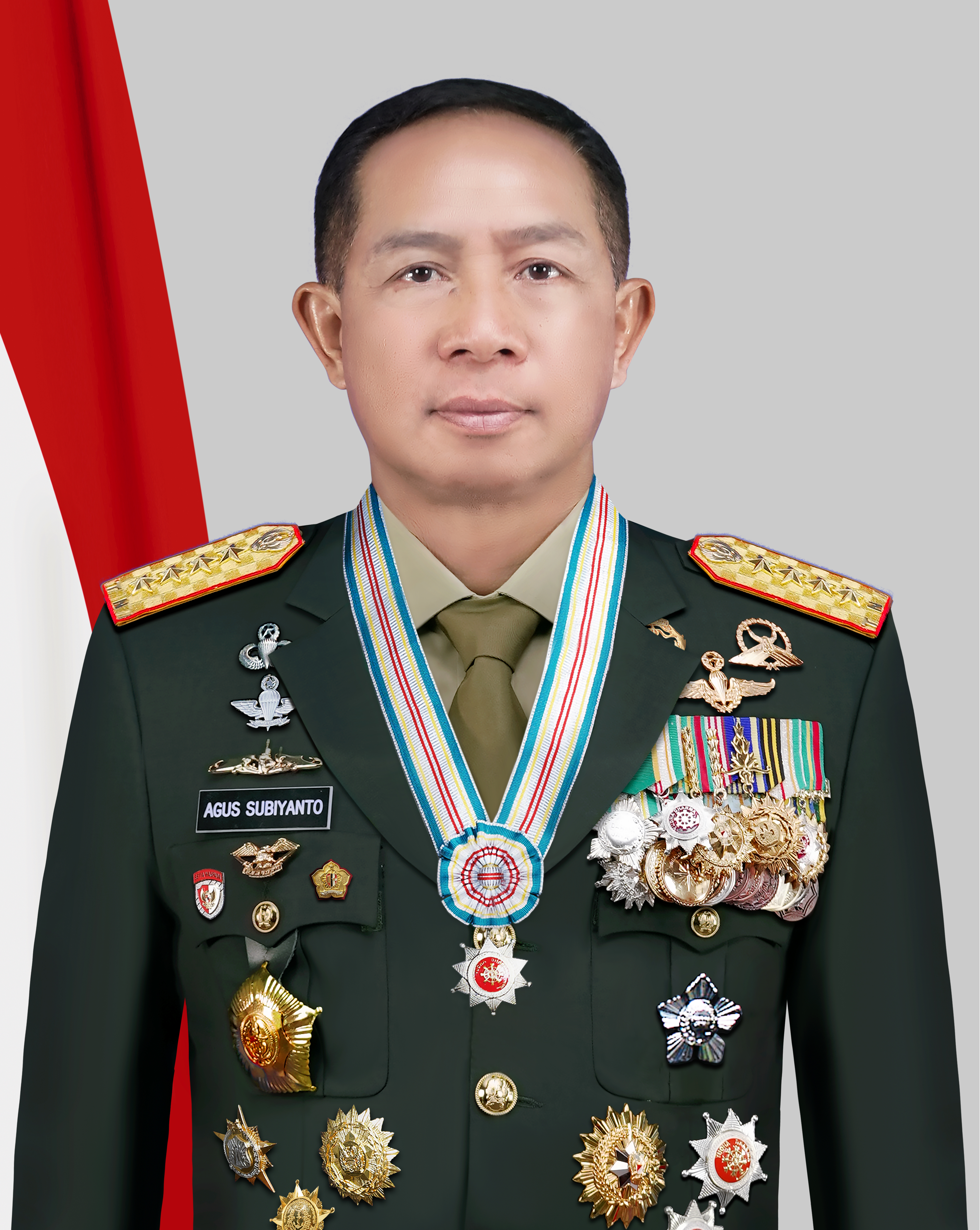
- Incumbent; General Agus Subiyanto since 22 November 2023
- Indonesian National Armed Forces
- Style: Panglima
- Reports to: President of Indonesia
- Residence: Official residence of the Commander of the Indonesian National Armed Forces, Menteng, Jakarta
- Seat: Indonesian Armed Forces Headquarters, Cilangkap, Jakarta
- Nominator: President of Indonesia
- Appointer: President of Indonesia with legislature (DPR) approval
- Formation: 12 November 1945; 81 years ago
- First holder: General Sudirman
- Deputy: Deputy Commander of the Indonesian National Armed Forces

The Commander of the Indonesian National Armed Forces (Indonesian: Panglima Tentara Nasional Indonesia, known as Panglima TNI) is the professional head and highest-ranking officer of the Indonesian National Armed Forces. Directly answerable to the president of Indonesia (the supreme commander), the position is held by any four-star officer who previously served as Chief of Staff of the Army (KSAD), Chief of Staff of the Navy (KSAL) or Chief of Staff of the Air Force (KSAU).

As the Commander, the officeholder has direct command and control over all of the Indonesian National Armed Forces' principal operational commands such as Army Strategic Command, Kopassus, Indonesian Marine Corps, Fleet Commands, Air Ops Commands, etc. Per the president's decree 66/2019, a four-star officer acting as Deputy Commander of the Indonesian National Armed Forces deputises for the Commander. The name of the office has evolved over the years, with the present name being finalized once the Indonesian National Police was separated from the Armed Forces in 1999. (Note: Prior to its current name, the Panglima TNI, the position was known as Grand Commander of the People's Security Forces (Panglima Besar Tentara Keamanan Rakyat), Commander of the Armed Forces of the Republic of Indonesia (Panglima Tentara Republik Indonesia), Commander of the War Forces of the Republic of Indonesia (Panglima Angkatan Perang Republik Indonesia), Chief of Staffs of the Armed Forces of the Republic of Indonesia (Kepala Staf ABRI), Commander of the Armed Forces of the Republic of Indonesia (Panglima ABRI), and finally Commander of the Indonesian National Armed Forces (Panglima TNI).)

The present Commander is General Agus Subiyanto, an Indonesian Army officer, who was inaugurated by President Joko Widodo on 22 November 2023.

== Responsibilities ==
As per Presidential Decree No. 66 of 2019, the responsibilities of the Commander of the Indonesian National Armed Forces are to:

- lead the Armed Forces
- implement the national defense policy
- exercise the military strategy & operations
- develop the doctrinal policies
- exercise Armed Forces power projection for military operation matters
- exercise Armed Forces power development and maintain operational readiness
- provide advice to the Minister of Defense on national defense policy
- provide advice to the Minister of Defense on the Armed Forces' demand fulfillment and other defense components
- provide advice to the Minister of Defense on the development and execution of strategic planning of national resources for national defense matters
- utilize reserve components after mobilized for military operation matters
- utilize supporting components which has been prepared for military operation matters
- exercise other roles and responsibilities entrusted to his office by the Constitution and laws of the Republic

== List of commanders ==
No.	Portrait	Name (Birth–Death)	Term of office			Defence branch	Ref.
No.	Portrait	Name (Birth–Death)	Took office	Left office	Time in office	Defence branch	Ref.
—	Oerip Soemohardjo	Lieutenant General; Oerip Soemohardjo (1893–1948); Acting	5 October 1945	12 November 1945	38 days	Army	
1	Sudirman	Lieutenant General; Sudirman (1916–1950) (Note: Position known as Grand Commander of the People's Security Armed Forces and later as Commander of the National Armed Forces (Panglima Besar Tentara Keamanan Rakyat until 1946, Panglima Besar TNI from 1948–1950 ))	12 November 1945	29 January 1950 †	4 years, 78 days	Army	
2	Tahi Bonar Simatupang	Major General; Tahi Bonar Simatupang (1920–1990) as Chief of Staff of the Armed Forces	29 January 1950	4 November 1953	3 years, 279 days	Army	
Vacant; Position abolished by President Sukarno after the 17 October 1952 incident.
3	Abdul Haris Nasution	General; Abdul Haris Nasution (1918–2000) as Chairman of the Joint Chiefs of Staff (Note: Also served concurrently as Chief of Staff of the Army.)	December 1955	July 1959	3 years, 7 months	Army	
4	Soerjadi Soerjadarma	Air Chief Marshal; Soerjadi Soerjadarma (1912–1975) as Chairman of the Joint Chiefs of Staff (Note: Also served concurrently as Chief of Staff of the Air Force.)	July 1959	19 January 1962	2 years, 6 months	Air Force	
(3)	Abdul Haris Nasution	General; Abdul Haris Nasution (1918–2000) as Chief of Staff of the Armed Forces	January 1962	March 1966	4 years, 1 month	Army	
Vacant; Position abolished by President Sukarno after the 30 September Movement.
5	Suharto	General; Suharto (1921–2008) as Commander of the Armed Forces (Note: Also served concurrently as President and Minister of Defense and Security.)	6 June 1968	28 March 1973	4 years, 9 months	Army	
6	Maraden Panggabean	General; Maraden Panggabean (1922–2000)	28 March 1973	17 April 1978	5 years, 1 month	Army	
7	Mohammad Jusuf	General; Mohammad Jusuf (1928–2004)	17 April 1978	28 March 1983	4 years, 11 months	Army	.
8	Benny Moerdani	General; Benny Moerdani (1932–2004) (Note: Also served concurrently as Commander of the Operational Command for the Restoration of Security and Order (Kopkamtib). First Commander of the Armed Forces who was not also appointed as Minister of Defense.)	28 March 1983	27 February 1988	4 years, 336 days	Army	.
9	Try Sutrisno	General; Try Sutrisno (1935–2026)	27 February 1988	19 February 1993	4 years, 358 days	Army	.
10	Edi Sudradjat	General; Edi Sudradjat (1938–2006) (Note: Also served concurrently as Minister of Defense and Security (from 17 March 1993) and Chief of Staff of the Army (until 23 March 1993).)	19 February 1993	21 May 1993	91 days	Army	.
11	Feisal Tanjung	General; Feisal Tanjung (1939–2013)	21 May 1993	12 February 1998	4 years, 267 days	Army	.
12	Wiranto	General; Wiranto (born 1947) (Note: Also served concurrently as Minister of Defense and Security.)	12 February 1998	26 October 1999	1 year, 256 days	Army	.
13	Widodo Adi Sutjipto	Admiral; Widodo Adi Sutjipto (1944–2026)	26 October 1999	7 June 2002	2 years, 224 days	Navy	.
14	Endriartono Sutarto	General; Endriartono Sutarto (born 1947)	7 June 2002	13 February 2006	3 years, 251 days	Army	.
15	Djoko Suyanto	Air Chief Marshal; Djoko Suyanto (born 1950)	13 February 2006	28 December 2007	1 year, 318 days	Air Force	
16	Djoko Santoso	General; Djoko Santoso (1952–2020)	28 December 2007	28 September 2010	2 years, 274 days	Army	.
17	Agus Suhartono	Admiral; Agus Suhartono (born 1955)	28 September 2010	30 August 2013	2 years, 336 days	Navy	
18	Moeldoko	General; Moeldoko (born 1957)	30 August 2013	8 July 2015	1 year, 312 days	Army	
19	Gatot Nurmantyo	General; Gatot Nurmantyo (born 1960)	8 July 2015	8 December 2017	2 years, 153 days	Army	
20	Hadi Tjahjanto	Air Chief Marshal; Hadi Tjahjanto (born 1963) (Note: also served concurrently as Chief of Staff of the Air Force (until 17 January 2018).)	8 December 2017	17 November 2021	3 years, 344 days	Air Force	.
21	Andika Perkasa	General; Andika Perkasa (born 1964)	17 November 2021	19 December 2022	1 year, 32 days	Army	.
22	Yudo Margono	Admiral; Yudo Margono (born 1965)	19 December 2022	22 November 2023	338 days	Navy	.
23	Agus Subiyanto	General; Agus Subiyanto (born 1967)	22 November 2023	Incumbent	2 years, 356 days	Army	.

== See also ==
- Deputy Commander of the Indonesian National Armed Forces
- Chief of Staff of the Indonesian Army
- Chief of Staff of the Indonesian Navy
- Chief of Staff of the Indonesian Air Force
- Chief of the Indonesian National Police
