= Tedjo Edhy Purdijatno =

Indonesian politician (born 1952)

Admiral (Ret) The Honourable Tedjo Edhy Purdijatno PJG GCCT PGAT
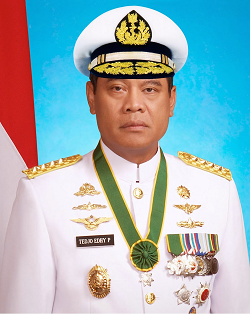

12th Coordinating Minister for Political, Legal and Security Affairs
- In office 27 October 2014 – 12 August 2015
- President: Joko Widodo
- Preceded by: Djoko Suyanto
- Succeeded by: Luhut Binsar Pandjaitan

21st Chief of Staff of the Indonesian Navy
- In office 1 July 2008 – 7 November 2009
- President: Susilo Bambang Yudhoyono
- Preceded by: Admiral Sumardjono
- Succeeded by: Admiral Agus Suhartono

Personal details
- Born: 20 September 1952 (age 74) Magelang, Central Java, Indonesia
- Party: Berkarya (since 2016)
- Other political affiliations: NasDem (2013–2016)
- Spouse: Yusfien Karlina
- Children: Dian Avianti Yustedjo; Devi Novani Yustedjo; Dika Oktaviani Yustedjo; Mahendra Aji Pratama
- Education: Indonesian Naval Academy
- Occupation: Politician; Naval officer

Military service
- Allegiance: Indonesia
- Branch/service: Indonesian Navy
- Years of service: 1975–2010
- Rank: Admiral
- Commands: Chief of Staff of the Indonesian Navy; Chief of General Staff of the Indonesian National Armed Forces; Commander of the Indonesian National Armed Forces Staff and Command School

Admiral (Ret.) Tedjo Edhy Purdijatno (born 20 September 1952) is an Indonesian politician and retired Naval officer. He was the Coordinating Minister for Political, Legal and Security Affairs of the Republic of Indonesia from 27 October 2014 to 12 August 2015. Tedjo was also the Chief of Staff of the Navy from 2008 to 2009.

== Education ==
Tedjo completed his military training at the Indonesian Naval Academy in 1975. He also obtained a law degree from Hang Tuah University, Surabaya in 2001. He also attended numerous military educations namely Indonesian Navy Staff and Command School, Indonesian Armed Forces Staff and Command School, National Defence Institution, National Resilience Institute Course batch 34.

== Personal life ==
Tedjo was born in Magelang, Central Java on 20 September 1952. He is married with 4 children.

== Military career ==
Tedjo has served for 35 years in Indonesian Navy. He served in numerous branches of the Indonesian Navy including the Naval Aviation Unit as Fixed wing Naval Aviator, he also served as the commanding officer of KRI Teluk Lampung (540), KRI Teluk Semangka (512) and KRI Multatuli (561).

Tedjo served in various branches of the Indonesian Navy namely

- Commander of the Amphibious unit of the Indonesian Navy Eastern Fleet Command
- Commander of the Western Fleet's Marine Security Group of the Indonesian Navy Western Fleet Command
- Chief of Staff Indonesian Navy Eastern Fleet Command
- Deputy Commander of the Indonesian Navy Staff and Command School
- Commander of the Indonesian Navy Western Fleet Command
- Planning Assistant to the Chief of Staff of the Indonesian Navy
- Chief of Staff of the Indonesian Navy

He was also served in various branches of the Indonesian National Armed Forces and Ministry of Defence of the Republic of Indonesia, namely

- Director General of Defence Planning of the Ministry of Defense (Indonesia)
- Commander of the Indonesian National Armed Forces Staff and Command School
- Chief of General Staff of the Indonesian National Armed Forces

He was inaugurated as Chief of Staff of the Navy on July 1, 2008, by the President Susilo Bambang Yudhoyono, replacing Admiral Sumardjono who is retired.

Admiral Tedjo Edhy Purdijatno was officially replaced by Admiral Agus Suhartono on 13 November 2009.

On 27 October 2014, he was appointed to serve in President Joko Widodo Working Cabinet (2014–2019) as Coordinating Minister for Political, Legal and Security Affairs of the Republic of Indonesia.

In 2015 he warned Australia that Indonesia could release a “human tsunami” of 10,000 asylum seekers to Australia if Canberra continues to agitate for clemency for the death row pair of the Bali Nine.

== Honours ==

Military Distinguished Service Star (Bintang Dharma) (20 June 2008)	Navy Meritorious Service Star, 1st Class (Bintang Jalasena Utama) (2009)	Army Meritorious Service Star, 1st Class (Bintang Kartika Eka Pakçi Utama)
Air Force Meritorius Service Star, 1st Class (Bintang Swa Bhuwana Paksa Utama)	National Police Meritorious Service Star, 1st Class (Bintang Bhayangkara Utama)	Grand Meritorious Military Order Star, 2nd Class (Bintang Yudha Dharma Pratama)
Meritorious Service Medal (Military) (Pingat Jasa Gemilang) (Tentera) - Singapore (3 December 2009)	Knight Grand Cross of the Most Noble Order of the Crown of Thailand - Thailand (13 March 2010)	Courageous Commander of the Most Gallant Order of Military Service (Pingat Panglima Gagah Angkatan Tentera) - Malaysia (6 October 2011)
Navy Meritorious Service Star, 2nd Class (Bintang Jalasena Pratama)	Grand Meritorious Military Order Star, 3rd Class (Bintang Yudha Dharma Nararya)	Navy Meritorious Service Star, 3rd Class (Bintang Jalasena Nararya)
Medal for Active Duty in the Navy (Satyalancana Dharma Samudra)	Military Long Service Medal, 32 Years (Satyalancana Kesetiaan 32 Tahun)	Military Long Service Medal, 24 Years (Satyalancana Kesetiaan 24 Tahun)
Military Long Service Medal, 16 Years (Satyalancana Kesetiaan 16 Tahun)	Military Long Service Medal, 8 Years (Satyalancana Kesetiaan 8 Tahun)	Military Operation Service Medal IX Raksaka Dharma (Satyalancana Gerakan Operasi Militer "GOM" IX Raksaka Dharma)
Medal for National Defense Service (Satyalancana Dharma Nusa)	Military Instructor Service Medals (Satyalancana Dwidya Sistha)	Social Welfare Medal (Satyalancana Kebaktian Sosial)

== Notes and references ==
Political offices
Preceded by Djoko Suyanto	Coordinating Minister for Political, Legal and Security Affairs of Indonesia; 2014–2015	Succeeded by Luhut Binsar Pandjaitan
Military offices
Preceded by Admiral Sumardjono	Chief of Staff of the Indonesian Navy; 2008–2009	Succeeded by Admiral Agus Suhartono
Preceded by Lieutenant General Erwin Sudjono	Chief of General Staff of the Indonesian National Armed Forces; 2008	Succeeded by Vice Admiral Yosaphat Didik Heru Purnomo
Preceded by Air Marshal M. Basri Sidehabi	Commander of the Indonesian National Armed Forces Staff and Command School; 2008	Succeeded by Air Marshal Ida Bagus Sanubari
