= Blitar (disambiguation) =

Blitar, is a city in East Java, Indonesia.

Blitar may also refer to:

- Blitar Regency, a regency in East Java, Indonesia
- Blitar railway station, a railway station in Blitar
- PSBK Blitar, football club based in Blitar Regency
- PSBI Blitar, football club based in Blitar City
- SMP Negeri 1 Blitar, public junior high school in Blitar
- SMA Negeri 1 Blitar, public senior high school in Blitar
