= Marsetio =

Indonesian admiral

Admiral Marsetio
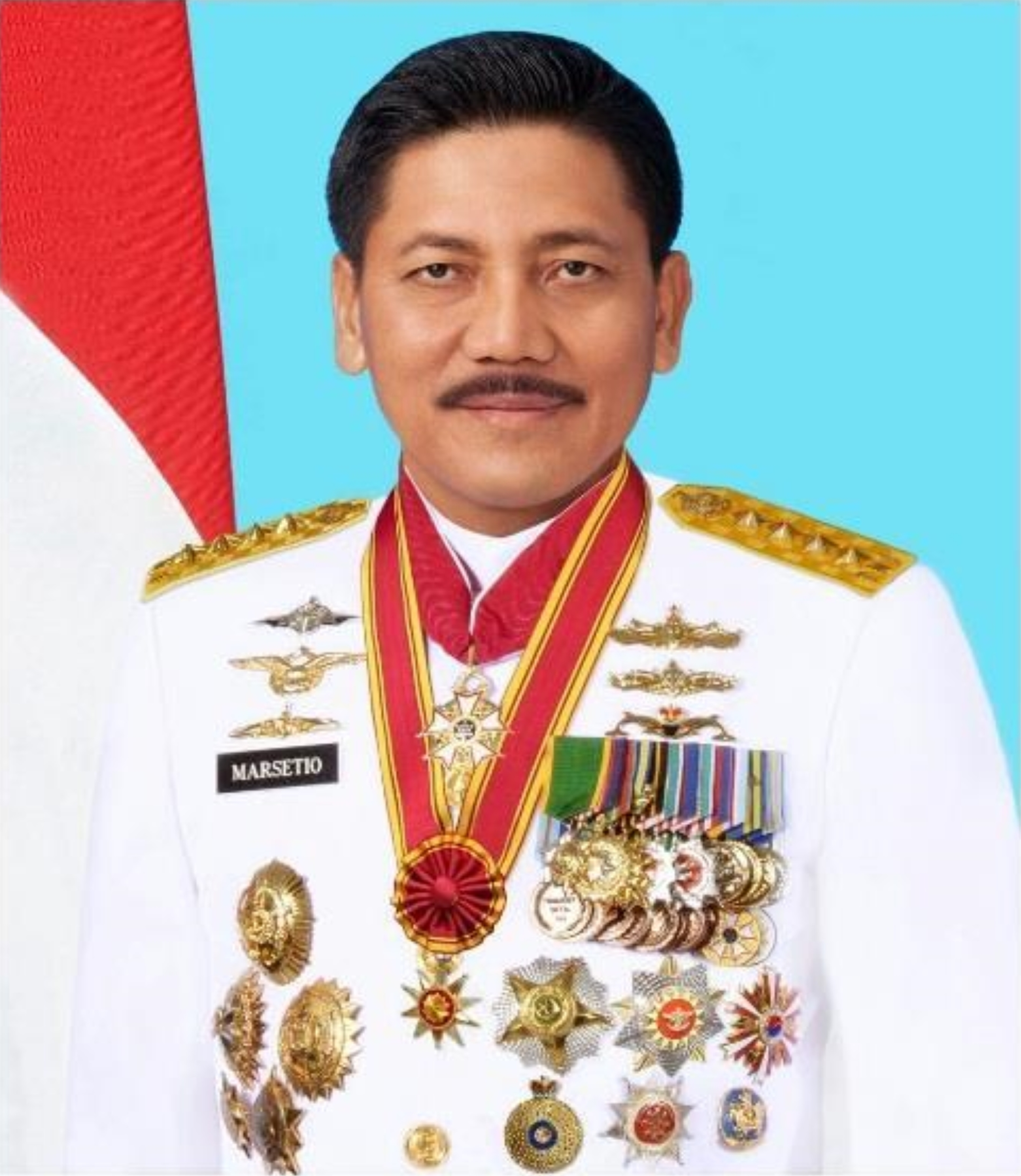
- Born: 3 December 1956 (age 69); Jakarta, Java, Indonesia
- Children: Rio Grace Bramantio; Rian Risky Putrantio
- Relatives: Penny Iriana Trikamandani
- Military career
- Allegiance: Indonesia
- Branch: Indonesian Navy
- Service years: 1981–2015
- Rank: Admiral
- Commands: Chief of Staff of Indonesian Navy
- Awards: See Honours

Admiral Marsetio (born 3 December 1956) was a former Chief of Naval Staff who served from 17 December 2012 to 31 December 2014 after being inaugurated by President Susilo Bambang Yudhoyono until 31 December 2014. He was then replaced by Admiral Ade Supandi.

== Career ==
He graduated from the AAL-33 TA Naval Academy in 1981. He has served various assignments both on warships and on staff.

Marsetio was the best graduate of AAL Bumimoro, Surabaya, in 1981. Prior to serving as the number one in the navy, the doctoral graduate from Gajah Mada University served as Deputy KASAL (WAKASAL).

In the midst of his busy service, Marsetio still finds time to share knowledge and knowledge, including as a lecturer at the Naval War College USA, at the Naval Command and Staff College, at Sesko TNI, at Lemhannas, as well as a lecturer at various universities, including at the College of Education. Naval Technology (STTAL), Indonesian Defense University (Unhan), University of Indonesia, Gadjah Mada University, Diponegoro University, and Raja Ali Haji Maritime University (Umrah) Tanjung Pinang, as well as Hang Tuah University Surabaya and Widya Mandala Catholic University Surabaya.

== Positions ==
- DPB of KRI Fatahillah (1981)
- Assistant Panagi of KRI Fatahillah (1982)
- Commissioned Communication Officer of KRI Nala (1984)
- Commissioned Executor Officer of KRI Layang (1985)
- Head of Division of PIT KRI Slamet Riyadi (1986)
- Head of Artillery Division of PS KRI Slamet Riyadi (1989)
- Head of Artillery Division of KRI Slamet Riyadi (1990)
- Head of Operations Department of KRI Nala (1991)
- Supervisory Officer of Motir Armatim (1992)
- Executing Officer of KRI Karel Satsuit Tubun (1995)
- Commander of KRI Sultan Thaha Syaifuddin (1995)
- Commissioned Officer of Mako Koarmabar (Dik Seskoal) (1996)
- Commissioned Operations Staff of Koarmabar (1998)
- Commander of KRI Nala (1998)
- Commander of KRI Ahmad Yani (1999)
- Commissioned Staff of Ahli Pangarmatim "D" Manajemen (2001)
- Head of Depjiastra Seskoal (2001)
- Commissioned Officer of Pembantu V Sops Kasal (2002)
- Commander of Kolata Armatim (2003)
- Operation Assistant of Koarmatim (2003)
- Commissioned Staff of Ahli Pangarmatim "E" Teknologi (2004)
- Head of Staff of Guspurla Koarmatim (2004)
- Representative of Asrena Kasal (2006)
- Commander of Lantamal IV/Tanjungpinang (2007)
- Representative Assistant of Operasi Kasum TNI (2008)
- Commander of Kolinlamil (2009)
- Commander of 1st Fleet Command (2009)
- Vice Chief of Staff of the Indonesian Navy (2010–2012)
- Chief of Staff of the Indonesian Navy (2012–2014)
- Professor of Universitas Pertahanan (2018)

== Honours ==

Star of Mahaputera, 3rd Class (Bintang Mahaputera Utama) (7 August 2015)	Military Distinguished Service Star (Bintang Dharma) (21 June 2011)	Navy Meritorious Service Star, 1st Class (Bintang Jalasena Utama) (19 June 2013)	Army Meritorious Service Star, 1st Class (Bintang Kartika Eka Pakçi Utama) (21 March 2014)
Air Force Meritorius Service Star, 1st Class (Bintang Swa Bhuwana Paksa Utama) (21 March 2014)	National Police Meritorious Service Star, 1st Class (Bintang Bhayangkara Utama)	Grand Meritorious Military Order Star, 2nd Class (Bintang Yudha Dharma Pratama) (5 July 2012)	Navy Meritorious Service Star, 2nd Class (Bintang Jalasena Pratama)
Grand Meritorious Military Order Star, 3rd Class (Bintang Yudha Dharma Nararya) (10 May 2010)	Navy Meritorious Service Star, 3rd Class (Bintang Jalasena Nararya)	Military Long Service Medal, 32 Years (Satyalancana Kesetiaan 32 Tahun)	Medal for Active Duty in the Navy (Satyalancana Dharma Samudra)
Military Long Service Medal, 24 Years (Satyalancana Kesetiaan 24 Tahun)	Military Long Service Medal, 16 Years (Satyalancana Kesetiaan 16 Tahun)	Military Long Service Medal, 8 Years (Satyalancana Kesetiaan 8 Tahun)	Military Operation Service Medal VII in Aceh (Satyalancana Gerakan Operasi Militer ("GOM") VII)
Military Instructor Service Medals (Satyalancana Dwidya Sistha)	Timor Military Campaign Medal (Satyalancana Seroja)	Medal for National Defense Service (Satyalancana Dharma Nusa)	Medal for Providing an Example of Meritorious Personality (Satyalancana Wira Karya)
Medal for Active Duty in Indonesia's Outer Islands (Satyalancana Wira Nusa)	Medal for Active Duty as a Border Guard (Satyalancana Wira Dharma)	Social Welfare Medal (Satyalancana Kebaktian Sosial)	Star of the Legion of Veterans of the Republic of Indonesia (8 March 2024)
Reserve Force Medal - Australia	Badge of Melati - The Pramuka Movement of Indonesia	Order of National Security Merit - 1st Class (Tongil Medal) - South Korea	Commander of the Legion of Merit - United States (1 October 2014)
Nishan-e-Imtiaz - Pakistan (26 November 2014)	Courageous Commander of the Most Gallant Order of Military Service (Pingat Panglima Gagah Angkatan Tentera) - Malaysia (19 December 2014)	Meritorious Service Medal (Military) (Pingat Jasa Gemilang) (Tentera) - Singapore (28 July 2015)	Honorary Officer of the Order of Australia (Military Division) - Australia (26 October 2015)

== See also ==
- Indonesian military ranks
