= Purwanti =

Indonesian military officer

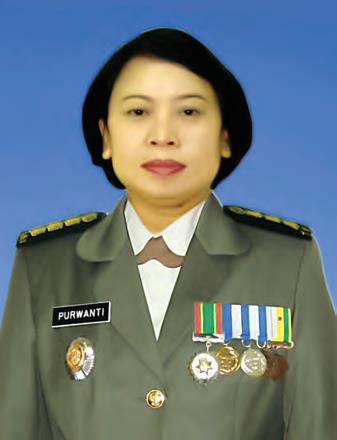

Member of the People's Representative Council
- In office 14 May 2002 – 1 October 2004
- President: Megawati Sukarnoputri
- Preceded by: Zawiah Ramlie

Personal details
- Born: 15 December 1958 Jakarta, Indonesia
- Died: 6 February 2016 (aged 57) Jakarta, Indonesia

Military service
- Allegiance: Indonesia
- Branch/service: Indonesian Army
- Years of service: 1981 – 2016
- Rank: Brigadier general
- Unit: Legal Corps

Purwanti (15 December 1958 – 6 February 2016) was an Indonesian military officer who has held several high ranking position within the Indonesian military law institution. She was the Indonesian Army legal director from March to September 2014 and the attorney general of the armed forces from September 2014 until her death in February 2016. She has also served as an armed forces appointee in the People's Representative Council from 2002 until 2004. She was the eighth female to become a flag officer in the Indonesian Army.

== Career ==
Purwanti was born in Jakarta on 15 December 1958. She joined the legal corps of the Indonesian army in 1981 after finishing her law education. She began her military career as an officer at the Army Women's Corps Education Center. Purwanti underwent further military education at the Indonesian Army Command and General Staff College in 2002.

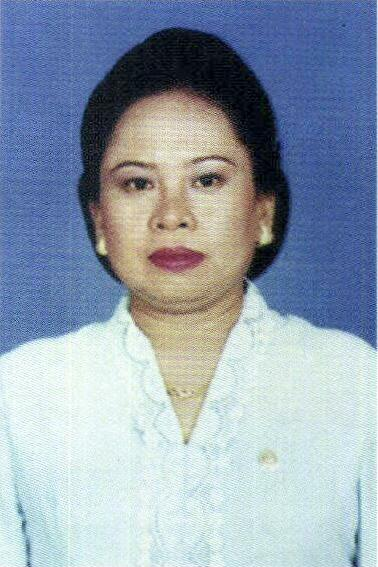
Purwanti as an MP in 2002.

On 14 May 2002, Purwanti became a member of the People's Representative Council as an appointee from the armed forces. She represented the Bengkulu electoral district and was seated in Commission VI of the People's Representative Council, which handles matters relating to religion, education, culture, and tourism. She was involved in the formulation of several bills relating to the judicial system.

Purwanti's term in the People's Representative Council ended on 1 October 2004. She was promoted to the rank of colonel sometime after than and became the Chairwoman of the Military Law Academy in 2009. She left this position sometime in early 2010s and became the secretary of the legal development agency of the armed forces.

In March 2014, Purwanti was appointed as the legal director of the Indonesian army. She was then accordingly promoted to the rank of brigadier general on 18 April, making her the eighth female to become a flag officer in the Indonesian Army. She held this position for less than a year, as in September 2014 she became the attorney general of the armed forces. She handed over her old position on 26 September.

Purwanti died on the dawn of 6 February 2016 at the Gatot Soebroto Army Hospital. The position of attorney general of the armed forces remained vacant until March that year.

== Awards ==
- Military Long Service Medals, 4th Category (Indonesian: Satyalancana Kesetiaan 8 Tahun)
- Military Long Service Medals, 3rd Category (Indonesian: Satyalancana Kesetiaan 16 Tahun)
- Military Long Service Medals, 2nd Category (Indonesian: Satyalancana Kesetiaan 24 Tahun)
- Military Instructor Service Medals (Indonesian: Satyalancana Dwidya Sistha)
- Star of Kartika Eka Paksi, 3rd Class (Indonesian: Bintang Kartika Eka Paksi Nararya)
- Star of Yudha Dharma, 3rd Class (Indonesian: Bintang Yudha Dharma Nararya) (20 January 2016)
