= Achmad Sutjipto =

Indonesian Navy Admiral (1945–2026)

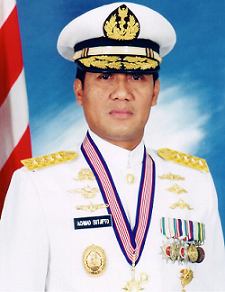

Chief of Staff of the Indonesian Navy
- In office 17 July 1999 – 9 October 2000
- Preceded by: Widodo Adi Sutjipto
- Succeeded by: Indroko Sastrowiryono

Personal details
- Born: 12 May 1945 Bondowoso, Japanese East Indies
- Died: 18 June 2026 (aged 81) Jakarta, Indonesia

Military service
- Allegiance: Indonesia
- Years of service: 1969–2000

Achmad Sutjipto (12 May 1945 – 18 June 2026) was an Indonesian Navy Admiral.

== Life and career ==
Sutjipto was born in Bondowoso, during the Japanese Occupation in the Dutch East Indies on 12 May 1945. He entered the Naval Academy in 1965 and graduated in 1969, he was appointed a second lieutenant.

He served as the chief of staff of the Navy between 17 July 1999 and 9 October 2000.

Sutjipto died in Jakarta on 18 June 2026, at the age of 81. He was buried at the Kalibata Heroes' Cemetery the next day.

Preceded by Widodo Adi Sutjipto	Chief of Staff of the Indonesian Navy; 1999–2000	Succeeded by Indroko Sastrowiryono
