= Agus Suhartono =

Indonesian admiral

Admiral (Ret.) Agus Suhartono
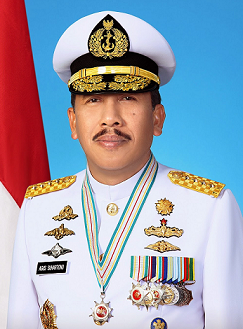
- Official portrait as Chief of Staff of the Navy

Commander of the National Armed Forces
- In office 28 September 2010 – 30 August 2013
- President: Susilo Bambang Yudhoyono
- Preceded by: General Djoko Santoso
- Succeeded by: General Moeldoko

Chief of Staff of the Navy
- In office 7 November 2009 – 28 September 2010
- President: Susilo Bambang Yudhoyono
- Preceded by: Admiral Tedjo Edhy Purdijatno
- Succeeded by: Admiral Soeparno

Personal details
- Born: 25 August 1955 (age 71) Blitar, East Java, Indonesia
- Spouse: Tetty Sugiarti
- Education: Indonesian Naval Academy

Military service
- Allegiance: Indonesia
- Branch/service: Indonesian Navy
- Years of service: 1978–2013
- Rank: Admiral
- Commands: Commander of the Indonesian National Armed Forces; Chief of Staff of the Indonesian Navy

Admiral (Ret.) Agus Suhartono (Indonesian pronunciation: [ˌaɡʊs suharˈt̪ono]; born 25 August 1955) is the former Commander of the Indonesian National Armed Forces.

== Biography ==
Agus Suhartono was born in Blitar, East Java on 25 August 1955 to state employee Mangundipura and Masiyem. He attended elementary school at SDN Sukorejo 2 Blitar, junior high school at SMP Negeri 1 Blitar, and senior high school at SMA Negeri 1 Blitar. After graduating in 1974, he followed his older brother's footsteps enrolled in the Naval Academy, which he graduated in 1978.

He was appointed chief of staff of the Indonesian Navy on 9 November 2009. He was later promoted to commander (Indonesian: Panglima) of the Indonesian National Armed Forces on 28 September 2010, replacing Djoko Santoso. His appointment was well received by the People's Representative Council. Tjahjo Kumolo, the chairman for the opposition, said that Agus "deserves the post more than (the) other (chiefs of staff).”

As commander, Agus has worked to increase the professionalism in the military and military reform. He also hopes to modernize Indonesia's aging military equipment.

Agus has also vowed to close the military-owned businesses, which have been seen as causing human rights violations by human rights groups and military analysts, and plans to further cooperation between the military and the Indonesian National Police in fighting terrorism.

In 2010, Agus received the Meritorious Service Medal (Military) for fostering good relations between the Indonesian and Singaporean military.

== Personal life ==
Agus is the first of ten siblings. He has a wife, Tetty Sugiarti, and two children.

Military offices
Preceded by Tedjo Edhy Purdijatno	Indonesian Navy Chief of Staff; 2009–2010	Succeeded by Soeparno
Preceded by Djoko Santoso	Commander of the Indonesian National Armed Forces; 2010–2013	Succeeded by Moeldoko
