= Sumardjono =

Indonesian naval admiral (born 1951)

Admiral Sumardjono
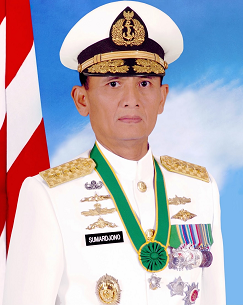
- Born: 21 June 1951 (age 75); Yogyakarta
- Military career
- Allegiance: Indonesia
- Branch: Indonesian Navy
- Service years: 1974-2008
- Rank: Admiral
- Commands: Chief of Staff of Indonesian Navy
- Awards: See Honours

Admiral Sumardjono (born 12 June 1951 in Yogyakarta, Indonesia) was the Chief of Naval Staff of the Republic of Indonesia from 7 November 2007 to 1 July 2008 replacing TNI Admiral Slamet Soebijanto.

== Career ==
Sumardjono, previously served as Inspector General of the Department of Defense. Sumardjono was once an aide to President Soeharto in 1995, Commander of the Naval Combat Group of the Armabar Command in 1999, Chief of Staff of Armatim, Commander of Armabar, Asrena Kasal, and Commander of the Indonesian National Armed Forces Staff and Command School in 2004 and Inspector General of the TNI who later served as Inspector General of the Indonesian Department of Defense.

== Positions ==
- President Suharto Aide (1995)
- Commander of 1st Fleet Command (2001 - 2002)
- Commander of Indonesian National Army Staff and Command College (2004 - 2005)
- Inspector General of the Indonesian National Armed Forces (2005 - 2007)
- Chief of Staff of the Indonesian Navy (2007 - 2008)

== Honours ==

Star of Mahaputera, 3rd Class (Bintang Mahaputera Utama) (2 October 2011)	Military Distinguished Service Star (Bintang Dharma) (9 November 2004)	Navy Meritorious Service Star, 1st Class (Bintang Jalasena Utama) (2 July 2008)
National Police Meritorious Service Star, 1st Class (Bintang Bhayangkara Utama)	Grand Meritorious Military Order Star, 2nd Class (Bintang Yudha Dharma Pratama)	Navy Meritorious Service Star, 2nd Class (Bintang Jalasena Pratama)
Grand Meritorious Military Order Star, 3rd Class (Bintang Yudha Dharma Nararya)	Navy Meritorious Service Star, 3rd Class (Bintang Jalasena Nararya)	Meritorious Service Medal (Military) (Pingat Jasa Gemilang) (Tentera) - Singapore (2008)
Military Long Service Medal, 24 Years (Satyalancana Kesetiaan 24 Tahun)	Military Operation Service Medal VII in Aceh (Satyalancana Gerakan Operasi Militer ("GOM") VII)	Military Instructor Service Medals (Satyalancana Dwidya Sistha)
Timor Military Campaign Medal (Satyalancana Seroja)	Medal for Providing an Example of Meritorious Personality (Satyalancana Wira Karya)	Medal for National Defense Service (Satyalancana Dharma Nusa)
