= Widodo Adi Sutjipto =

Indonesian admiral (1944–2026)

Admiral (Ret.) Widodo Adi Sutjipto
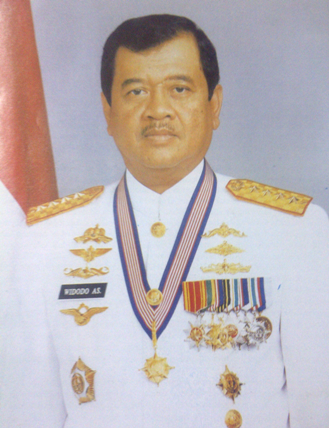

10th Coordinating Minister for Political, Legal, and Security Affairs
- In office 21 October 2004 – 20 October 2009
- President: Susilo Bambang Yudhoyono
- Preceded by: Susilo Bambang Yudhoyono; Hari Sabarno (acting)
- Succeeded by: Djoko Suyanto

13th Commander of the Indonesian National Armed Forces
- In office 26 October 1999 – 7 June 2002
- President: Abdurrahman Wahid; Megawati Sukarnoputri
- Preceded by: General Wiranto
- Succeeded by: General Endriartono Sutarto

6th Deputy Commander of the Indonesian National Armed Forces
- In office 17 July 1999 – 26 October 1999
- President: B. J. Habibie; Abdurrahman Wahid
- Preceded by: Admiral Sudomo
- Succeeded by: General Fachrul Razi

15th Chief of Staff of the Indonesian Navy
- In office 26 June 1998 – 17 July 1999
- President: B. J. Habibie
- Preceded by: Admiral Arief Koeshariadi
- Succeeded by: Admiral Achmad Sutjipto

Personal details
- Born: 1 August 1944 Boyolali, Japanese-occupied Dutch East Indies
- Died: 24 October 2026 (aged 82) Jakarta, Indonesia
- Party: Independent
- Spouse: Murniati Widodo
- Education: Indonesian Naval Academy
- Occupation: Naval officer; politician

Military service
- Allegiance: Indonesia
- Branch/service: Indonesian Navy
- Years of service: 1968–2002
- Rank: Admiral
- Commands: KRI Ki Hajar Dewantara; KRI Halim Perdanakusuma; Western Fleet Command; Indonesian Navy; Indonesian Armed Forces

Admiral Widodo Adi Sutjipto (1 August 1944 – 24 October 2026) was a Commander of the National Armed Forces (TNI) of Indonesia. He served as the 10th Coordinating Minister for Political, Legal, and Security Affairs of Indonesia from 2004 to 2009. Sutjipto was the first commander coming from service branch other than the Army since 1962, and the first from the Navy. He died in Jakarta on 24 October 2026, at the age of 82.

== Honours ==
=== National ===
- Star of Mahaputera, 2nd Class (Indonesian: Bintang Mahaputera Adipradana) (1999)
- Star of Meritorious Service (Indonesian: Bintang Dharma)
- Grand Meritorious Military Order Star, 1 Class (Indonesian: Bintang Yudha Dharma Utama)
- Army Meritorious Service Star, 1 Class (Indonesian: Bintang Kartika Eka Paksi Utama)
- Navy Meritorious Service Star, 1 Class (Indonesian: Bintang Jalasena Utama)
- Air Force Meritorious Service Star, 1 Class (Indonesian: Bintang Swa Bhuana Paksa Utama)
- Star of Bhayangkara, 1st Class (Indonesian: Bintang Bhayangkara Utama)

=== Foreign honours ===
- Brunei:
  - First Class of the Order of Paduka Keberanian Laila Terbilang (DPKT) - Dato Paduka Seri
- Malaysia
  - Courageous Commander of the Most Gallant Order of Military Service (PGAT)
- Singapore
  - Recipient of the Darjah Utama Bakti Cemerlang (Tentera) (DUBC) (2001)
  - Pingat Jasa Gemilang (Tentera) (PJG) (2000)
- Thailand
  - Knight Grand Cross (First Class) of the Most Exalted Order of the White Elephant (KCE)

Political offices
Preceded by Susilo Bambang Yudhoyono; Hari Sabarno (acting)	Coordinating Minister for Political, Legal, and Security Affairs; 2004–2009	Succeeded by Djoko Suyanto
Military offices
Preceded by Wiranto	Commander of the Indonesian National Armed Forces; 1999–2002	Succeeded by Endriartono Sutarto
Preceded by Sudomo	Deputy Commander of the Indonesian National Armed Forces; 1999	Succeeded by Fachrul Razi
Preceded by Arief Koeshariadi	Chief of Staff of the Indonesian Navy; 1998–1999	Succeeded by Achmad Sutjipto
