= Chief of Staff of the Indonesian Navy =

Highest position within the Indonesian Navy

- Kepala Staf TNI Angkatan Laut

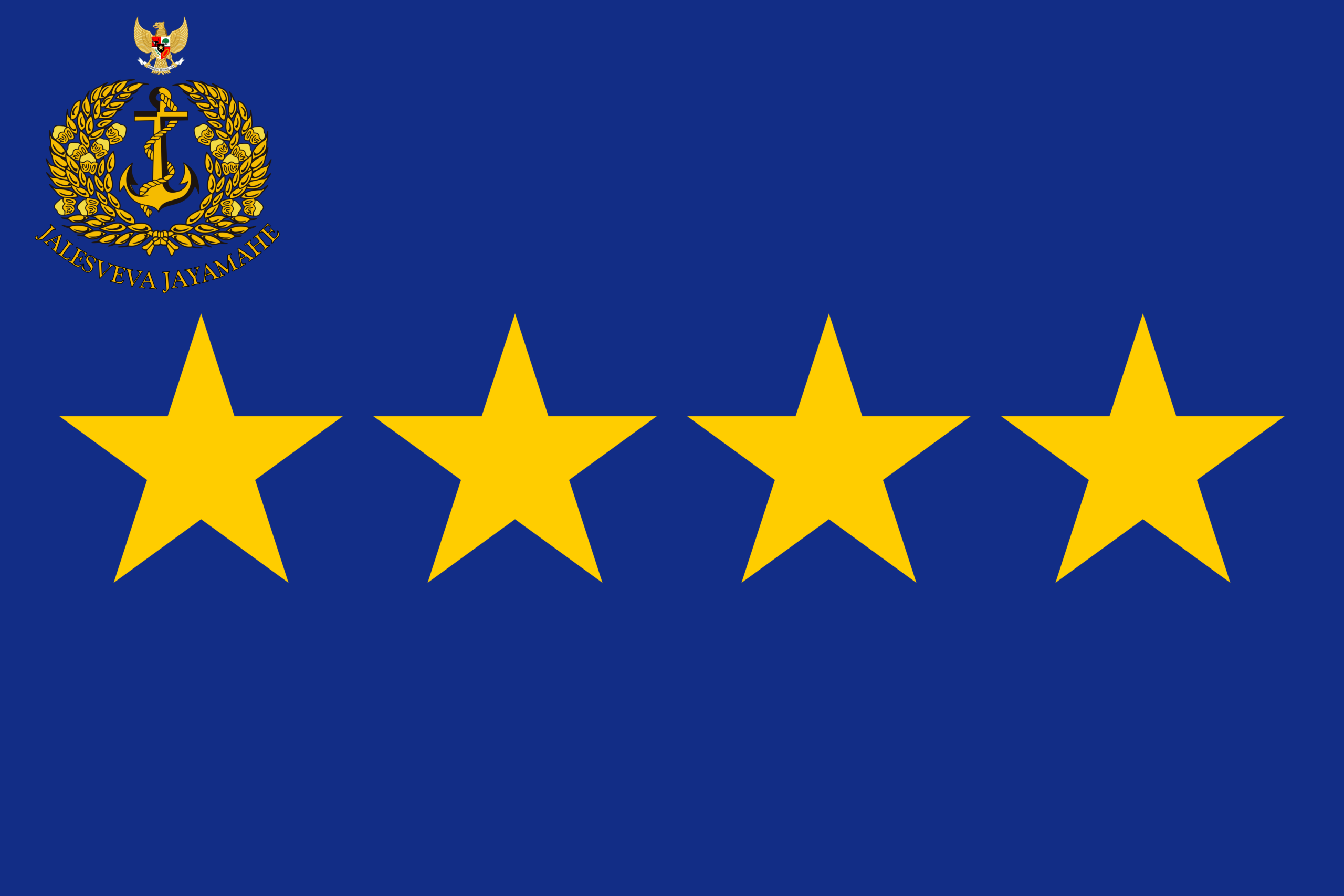
- Flag of the Chief of Staff

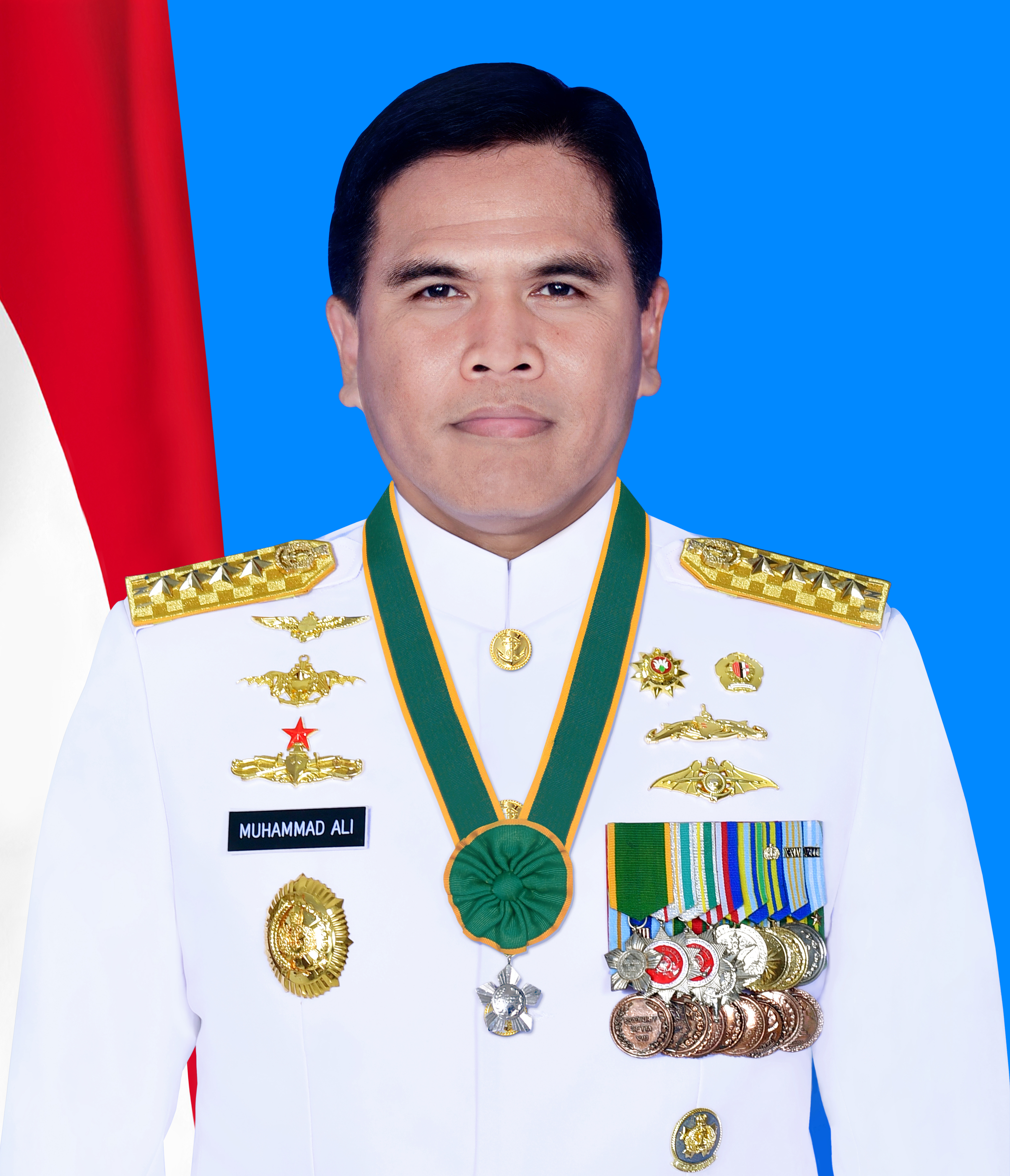
- Incumbent; Admiral Muhammad Ali since 28 December 2022
- Indonesian Navy
- Abbreviation: KSAL / Kasal
- Reports to: Commander of the Indonesian National Armed Forces
- Seat: Navy Headquarter, Cilangkap - Jakarta
- Nominator: Commander of the Indonesian National Armed Forces
- Appointer: President of Indonesia
- Precursor: Commander of 1st Defense Joint Service Regional Command
- Formation: 10 September 1945; 81 years ago
- First holder: Admiral III Mas Pardi
- Deputy: Vice Chief of Staff of the Indonesian Navy

The Chief of Staff of the Indonesian Navy (Indonesian: Kepala Staf TNI Angkatan Laut, abbreviated KSAL or KASAL) is the highest position in the Indonesian Navy. The position is held by the four-star Admiral or Marine General, appointed by and reporting directly to the Commander of the Indonesian National Armed Forces. Chief of Staff is assisted by Vice Chief of Staff of the Indonesian Navy, position is held by three-star Admiral or Marine General.

== Responsibilities ==
As stated by presidential decree 66/2019, the responsibilities of Chief of Staff of the Indonesian Navy are as follows:

- lead the navy on the power consolidation / development and operational readiness
- assist the Commander of the Indonesian National Armed Forces on policy development about navy's power posture, doctrine, strategy, and military operations
- assist the Commander of the Indonesian National Armed Forces on national defense component according to the navy need
- execute other navy duty mandated by the Commander of the Indonesian National Armed Forces

== List of officeholders ==
No.	Portrait	Name (born–died)	Term of office			Ref.
No.	Portrait	Name (born–died)	Took office	Left office	Time in office	Ref.
1		Admiral III; Mas Pardi (1901–1968)	November 1945	February 1946	3 months	
2		Admiral III; Mohammad Nazir Isa (1910–1982)	February 1946	April 1948	2 years, 2 months	
3		Vice Admiral; R. Soebijakto (1917–1999)	April 1948	July 1959	11 years, 3 months	
4		Vice Admiral; R.E. Martadinata (1921–1966)	July 1959	25 February 1966	6 years, 7 months	
5		Admiral; R. Moeljadi (1924–1972)	25 February 1966	16 December 1969	3 years, 294 days	
6		Admiral; Muhammad Sudomo (1926–2012)	16 December 1969	26 June 1973	3 years, 192 days	
7		Admiral; R. Soebono (1927–1992)	26 June 1973	26 June 1974	1 year, 0 days	
8		Admiral; R.S. Subijakto (1926–2003)	26 June 1974	1977	2–3 years	
9		Admiral; Waloejo Soegito (1926–2010)	1977	4 December 1982	4–5 years	
10		Admiral; Mochamad Romly (1928–2000)	4 December 1982	11 April 1986	3 years, 128 days	
11		Admiral; Rudolf Kasenda (1934–2010)	11 April 1986	1989	2–3 years	
12		Admiral; Muhamad Arifin (1937–2010)	1989	1993	3–4 years	
13		Admiral; Tanto Kuswanto (born 1941)	1993	15 March 1996	2–3 years	
14		Admiral; Arief Koeshariadi (born 1944)	15 March 1996	26 June 1998	2 years, 103 days	
15		Admiral; Widodo Adi Sutjipto (1944–2026)	26 June 1998	17 July 1999	1 year, 21 days	
16		Admiral; Achmad Sutjipto (1945–2026)	17 July 1999	9 October 2000	1 year, 84 days	
17		Admiral; Indroko Sastrowiryono	9 October 2000	25 April 2002	1 year, 198 days	
18		Admiral; Bernard Kent Sondakh (born 1948)	25 April 2002	18 February 2005	2 years, 299 days	
19		Admiral; Slamet Soebijanto (born 1951)	18 February 2005	7 November 2007	2 years, 262 days	
20		Admiral; Sumardjono (born 1951)	7 November 2007	1 July 2008	237 days	
21		Admiral; Tedjo Edhy Purdijatno (born 1952)	1 July 2008	7 November 2009	1 year, 129 days	
22		Admiral; Agus Suhartono (born 1955)	7 November 2009	28 September 2010	294 days	
23		Admiral; Soeparno (born 1955)	28 September 2010	17 December 2012	2 years, 111 days	
24		Admiral; M. Marsetio (born 1956)	17 December 2012	31 December 2014	2 years, 14 days	
25		Admiral; Ade Supandi (born 1960)	31 December 2014	23 May 2018	3 years, 143 days	
26		Admiral; Siwi Sukma Adji (born 1962)	23 May 2018	20 May 2020	1 year, 363 days	
27		Admiral; Yudo Margono (born 1965)	20 May 2020	28 December 2022	2 years, 222 days	
28		Admiral; Muhammad Ali (born 1967)	28 December 2022	Incumbent	3 years, 320 days	

== See also ==
- Commander of the Indonesian National Armed Forces
- Deputy Commander of the Indonesian National Armed Forces
- Chief of Staff of the Indonesian Army
- Chief of Staff of the Indonesian Air Force
