= Djoko Santoso =

Indonesian Army officer (1952–2020)

General (Ret.) Djoko Santoso
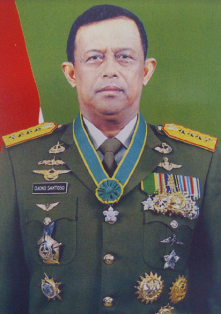

Commander of the National Armed Forces
- In office 28 December 2007 – 28 September 2010
- President: Susilo Bambang Yudhoyono
- Preceded by: ACM Djoko Suyanto
- Succeeded by: Admiral Agus Suhartono

Chief of Staff of the Army
- In office 18 February 2005 – 28 December 2007
- President: Susilo Bambang Yudhoyono
- Preceded by: General Ryamizard Ryacudu
- Succeeded by: General Agustadi Sasongko Purnomo

Personal details
- Born: 8 September 1952 Surakarta, Central Java, Indonesia
- Died: 10 May 2020 (aged 67) Jakarta, Indonesia
- Party: Great Indonesia Movement Party
- Education: Indonesian Military Academy

Military service
- Allegiance: Indonesia
- Branch/service: Indonesian Army
- Years of service: 1975–2010
- Rank: General
- Commands: Commander of the Indonesian National Armed Forces; Chief of Staff of the Indonesian Army

General (Ret.) Djoko Santoso (Indonesian pronunciation: [ˈdʒoko sanˈtoso]; 8 September 1952 – 10 May 2020) was an Indonesian army officer. He was Chief of Staff of the Indonesian Army from 2005 to 2007. He was then appointed the Commander of the Indonesian National Armed Forces, in which office he served from 2007 until his retirement in 2010.

In his retirement, he joined the Great Indonesia Movement Party.

He died in the Gatot Soebroto Army Hospital on 10 May 2020 due to a stroke.

== Honours ==
- Order of Paduka Keberanian Laila Terbilang First Class (DPKT; 15 July 2010) – Dato Paduka Seri

Military offices
Preceded by Ryamizard Ryacudu	Chief of Staff of the Indonesian Army; 2005–2007	Succeeded by Agustadi Sasongko Purnomo
Preceded by Djoko Suyanto	Commander of the Indonesian National Armed Forces; 2007–2010	Succeeded by Agus Suhartono
