= SMA Negeri 1 Blitar =

Coordinates: 8.1006°S 112.1806°E

- Jl. A. Yani 112 Blitar, East Java, Indonesia

Information
- Type: Public
- Motto: Discipline, Friendliness and Achievement are Our Prides
- Established: August 22, 1955
- Principal: Drs. Ahmad Damanhuri, M.Pd.
- Enrollment: Approx. 350/year
- Color: Blue
- Nickname: SMASA
- Website: www.sman1blitar.sch.id

SMA Negeri 1 Blitar, also known as SMASA, is a public senior high school which is located at Jalan A. Yani 112 Blitar, East Java, Indonesia. This school was established on August 22, 1955, occupying a former Dutch school building, the Noormal School I.

== Notable alumni ==
- Boediono
- Admiral Agus Suhartono
