= Slamet Soebijanto =

Indonesian naval admiral (born 1951)

Admiral Slamet Soebijanto
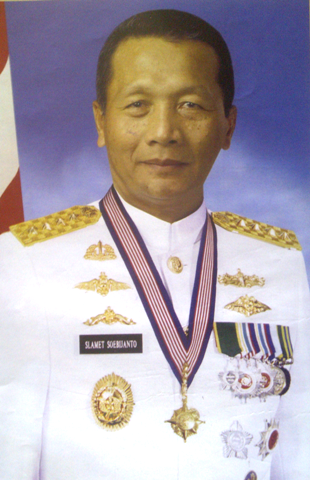
- Born: 21 June 1951 (age 75); Mojokerto, East Java
- Military career
- Allegiance: Indonesia
- Branch: Indonesian Navy
- Service years: 1973-2007
- Rank: Admiral
- Commands: Chief of Staff of Indonesian Navy
- Awards: See Honours

Admiral (ret.) Slamet Soebijanto (born 4 June 1951 in Mojokerto, Indonesia) was the Chief of Naval Staff of the Republic of Indonesia from 18 February 2005 to 7 November 2007. He has received the Bintang Dharma medal given to military officers for service and devotion.

== Career ==
Slamet Soebijanto graduated from the military education of AKABRI Laut-19 (1973). Then he took education at Alut Baru/Ops. School, Netherlands (1980), Operational Art, Yugoslavia (1990) and KRA-33 Lemhannas (2000 - 2001).

He has been assigned to, among others: Head of Navigation Section of KRI Thamrin (1974), Head of Naval Operations Department of KRI Rakata (1980), Head of the Strategic Reserves Division of Seskoal Education Office (1991), and Deputy of the Indonesian National Defense Forces (2000). His last position before serving as Chief of Naval Staff was as Deputy Governor of Lemhannas (2003).

== Positions ==
- Head of Navigation Section of KRI Thamrin (1974)
- Head of Naval Operations Department KRI Rakata (1980)
- Commander of KRI Pulau Ratewo
- Commander of KRI Monginsidi
- Head of the Directorate of Education, Seskoal (1991)
- TNI Retirement Home (2000)
- Asrenum Commander of the Indonesian National Armed Forces
- Commander of 2nd Fleet Command (2003)
- Deputy Governor of National Resilience Institute (2003-2005)

== Honours ==

Military Distinguished Service Star (Bintang Dharma) (9 November 2004)
Navy Meritorious Service Star, 1st Class (Bintang Jalasena Utama)	Army Meritorious Service Star, 1st Class (Bintang Kartika Eka Pakçi Utama)	Air Force Meritorius Service Star, 1st Class (Bintang Swa Bhuwana Paksa Utama)
National Police Meritorious Service Star, 1st Class (Bintang Bhayangkara Utama)	Grand Meritorious Military Order Star, 2nd Class (Bintang Yudha Dharma Pratama)	Navy Meritorious Service Star, 2nd Class (Bintang Jalasena Pratama)
Grand Meritorious Military Order Star, 3rd Class (Bintang Yudha Dharma Nararya)	Navy Meritorious Service Star, 3rd Class (Bintang Jalasena Nararya)	Military Long Service Medal, 24 Years (Satyalancana Kesetiaan 24 Tahun)
Military Instructor Service Medals (Satyalancana Dwidya Sistha)	Timor Military Campaign Medal (Satyalancana Seroja)	Meritorious Service Medal (Military) (Pingat Jasa Gemilang) (Tentera) - Singapore
