= SMP Negeri 1 Blitar =

Coordinates: 8.0997°S 112.1703°E

- Jl. A. Yani 8 Blitar, East Java, Indonesia

Information
- Type: Public
- Motto: Tiada hari tanpa prestasi
- Established: August 19, 1946
- Principal: Kateman, S.Pd. M.Pd.
- Enrollment: Approx. 300/year
- Color: Green
- Nickname: Step'n One
- Website: www.smpn1blitar.sch.id

SMP Negeri 1 Blitar is a public junior high school which is located at Jalan A. Yani 8 Blitar, East Java, Indonesia. This school was established on August 19, 1946, occupying a former Dutch school building, the Hollandsch-Inlandsche School (HIS).

== Notable alumni ==
- Boediono
- Admiral Agus Suhartono
