= Orders, decorations, and medals of Indonesia =

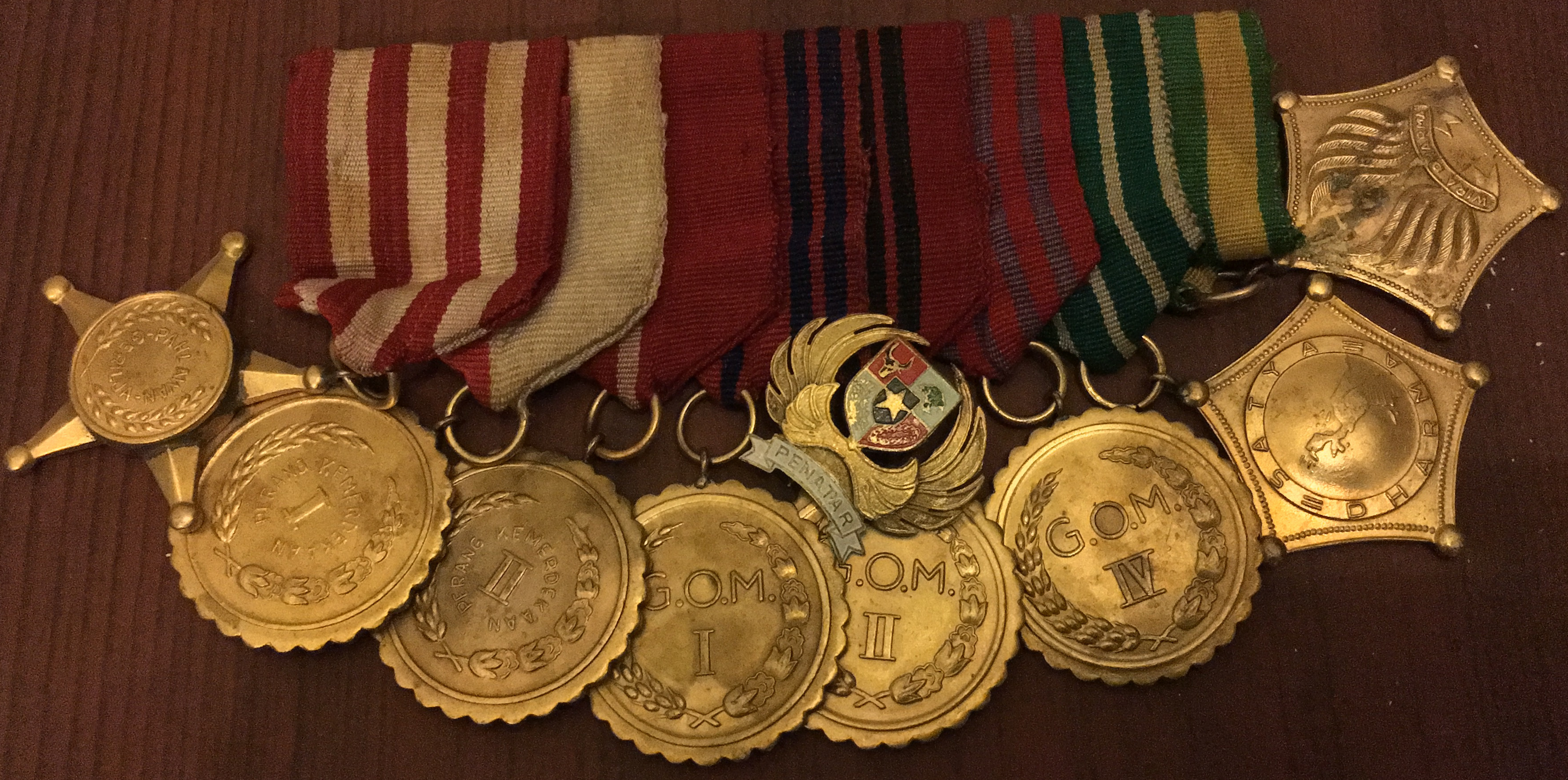
Indonesian military decorations

Orders, decorations, and medals of Indonesia are both military and civilian awards for service and personal contributions to the Republic of Indonesia. According to the Constitution of Indonesia, Chapter III Article 15: "The President grants titles, decorations and other honors as regulated by Law".

Refer to Law no. 20/2009, there are three types of awards; the title of National Hero of Indonesia, Mark of Service (Tanda Jasa) and Mark of Prestige (Tanda Kehormatan). Mark of Service consist of Medali (pentagon-shaped decoration medal), while Mark of Prestige consists of Stars of the Republic of Indonesia (star-shaped decoration medal), Satyalancana (round-shaped decoration medal), and Samkaryanugraha (distinction trophy).

All of the awards and decorations of the Republic of Indonesia are awarded to individuals of Indonesian citizenship and may be awarded to foreign nationals, except for the Samkaryanugraha which is awarded to institutions or organizations. Names of the awards and decorations incorporated abundant sanskrit words, as usually employed by the government in many other awards and names of institutions.

== National Hero of Indonesia ==
National Hero of Indonesia (Pahlawan Nasional Indonesia) is the highest-level title awarded in Indonesia. It is posthumously given by the Government of Indonesia for actions which are deemed to be heroic, defined as "actual deeds which can be remembered and exemplified for all time by other citizens" or "extraordinary service furthering the interests of the state and people".

== Mark of Service ==
=== Medali ===
Medali is a state award given by the President to someone who is meritorious and has extraordinary achievements in developing and advancing a particular field that is of great benefit to the nation and state.

==== Medali Kepeloporan (Medal of Pioneership) ====
"Medal of Pioneership" is awarded to any person:

1. with incredible track record of starting, developing, or promoting the improvements of various sectors of society,
2. who has made incredible breakthroughs in science, research, and technology, or
3. who has made evident work in national development.

Medali Kepeloporan

==== Medali Kejayaan (Medal of Glory) ====
"Medal of Glory" is awarded to any person who has "made a name for his/her nation" in education, science, technology, sports, arts, religion, and other sectors of society.

Medali Kejayaan

==== Medali Perdamaian (Medal of Peace) ====
"Medal of Peace" is awarded to any person who has contributed and promoted peace and cooperation among the nations of the world.

Medali Perdamaian

== Mark of Prestige ==
=== Stars of the Republic of Indonesia ===
President of Indonesia, as the grand master responsible for the issue of orders, decorations and medals, and as the primary owner of star decorations, is automatically awarded the highest class of all civil and military service star decorations. Vice President of Indonesia is also automatically bestowed 2nd class of Star of the Republic of Indonesia and all other highest class civil service star decorations.

==== Stars for Civil Service ====
===== Bintang Republik Indonesia (Star of the Republic of Indonesia) =====
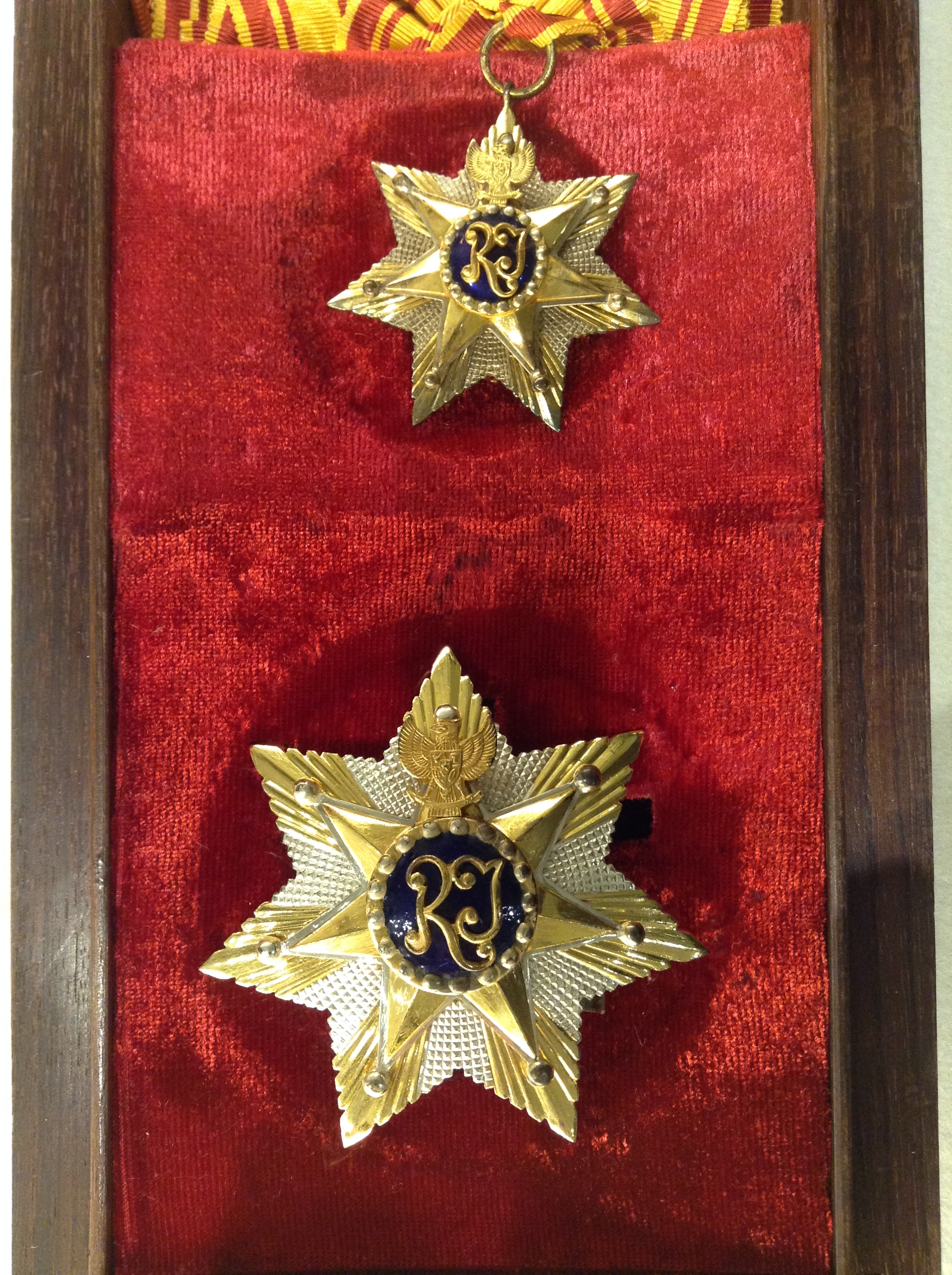
Bintang Republik Indonesia Adipradana

The "Star of the Republic of Indonesia" (BRI) is awarded to a person who has given extraordinary service to the integrity, viability, and greatness of Indonesia. It is the highest decoration awarded by the Government of Indonesia.

The BRI is awarded in 5 classes:

1st Class	Bintang Republik Indonesia Adipurna
2nd Class	Bintang Republik Indonesia Adipradana
3rd Class	Bintang Republik Indonesia Utama
4th Class	Bintang Republik Indonesia Pratama
5th Class	Bintang Republik Indonesia Nararya

===== Bintang Mahaputera (Star of Mahaputera) =====
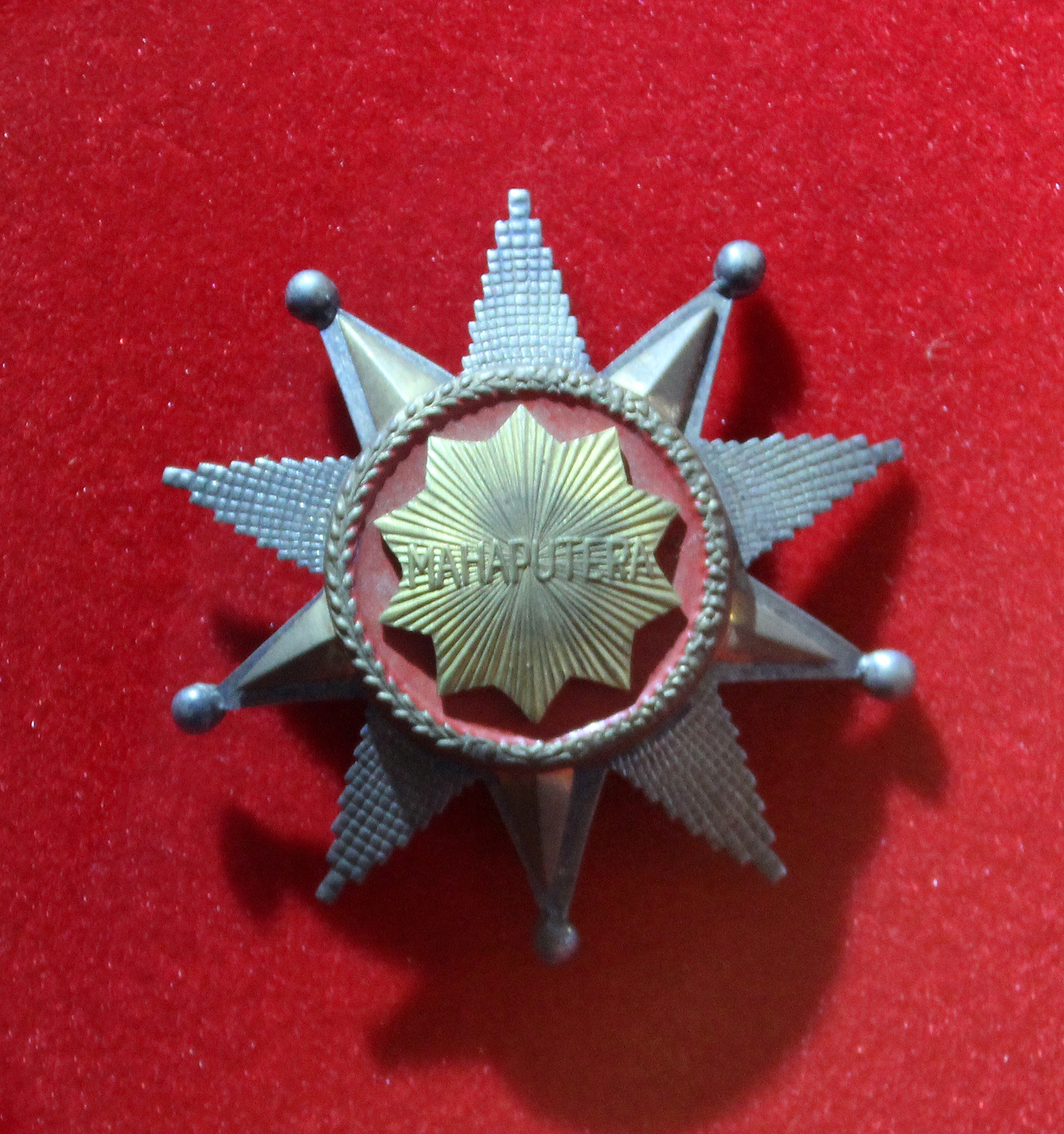
Bintang Mahaputera

The "Star of Mahaputera" (BMP) is awarded to a person who has given extraordinary service to the motherland in certain areas outside the military. It is the second highest decoration awarded by the Government of The Republic of Indonesia.

The BMP is awarded in 5 classes:

1st Class	Bintang Mahaputera Adipurna
2nd Class	Bintang Mahaputera Adipradana
3rd Class	Bintang Mahaputera Utama
4th Class	Bintang Mahaputera Pratama
5th Class	Bintang Mahaputera Nararya

===== Bintang Jasa (Star of Service) =====
The "Star of Service" (BJ) is awarded for civil bravery and courage in times of adversity.

The BJ is awarded in 3 classes:

1st Class	Bintang Jasa Utama
2nd Class	Bintang Jasa Pratama
3rd Class	Bintang Jasa Nararya

===== Bintang Kemanusiaan (Star of Humanities) =====
The "Humanities Star" (BK) is awarded to a person who has given extraordinary service in upholding humanities value and human rights.

Bintang Kemanusiaan

===== Bintang Penegak Demokrasi (Star of the Upholder of Democracy) =====
The "Star of the Upholder of Democracy" (BPD) is awarded to a person who has given extraordinary for service in upholding democratic principles.

The BPD is awarded in 3 classes:

1st Class	Bintang Penegak Demokrasi Utama
2nd Class	Bintang Penegak Demokrasi Pratama
3rd Class	Bintang Penegak Demokrasi Nararya

===== Bintang Budaya Parama Dharma (Cultural Merit Star) =====
The "Cultural Merit Star" (BBPD) is awarded to a person who has given extraordinary involvement in the promotion, education and preservation of Indonesian culture and arts.

Bintang Budaya Parama Dharma

===== Bintang Bhayangkara (National Police Meritorious Service Star) =====
The "National Police Meritorious Service Star" (BB) is awarded to personnel of the Indonesian National Police for meritorious service to the nation and in helping to uphold the rule of law. The BB can also be awarded to civilians for extraordinary service in the development and progress of the National Police, as well as in assistance in the performance of the duties and functions of the police as mandated by the constitution and laws of the Republic.

The BB is awarded in three classes:

1st Class	Bintang Bhayangkara Utama
2nd Class	Bintang Bhayangkara Pratama
3rd Class	Bintang Bhayangkara Nararya

==== Stars for military service ====
Stars for military service are typically issued to military personnel for sustained meritorious service while serving in the Indonesian National Armed Forces. However, stars may also be issued to civilians for their extraordinary service and contributions made to the advancement and progress of the entire Indonesian National Armed Forces as well as in helping to perform the duties of national defense and community development entrusted to the National Armed Forces by the Constitution.

===== Bintang Gerilya (Guerrilla Star) =====
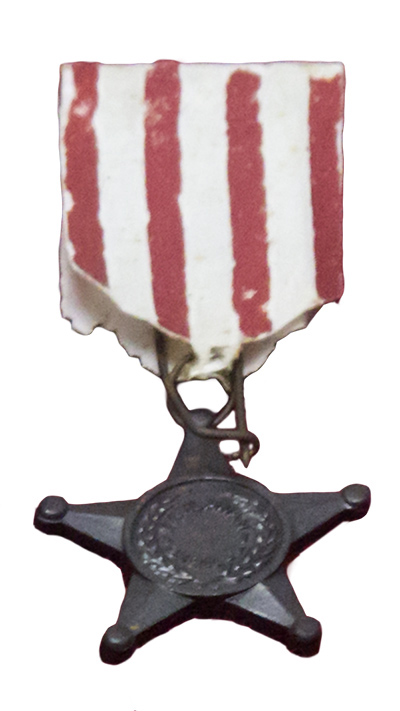
Bintang Gerilya

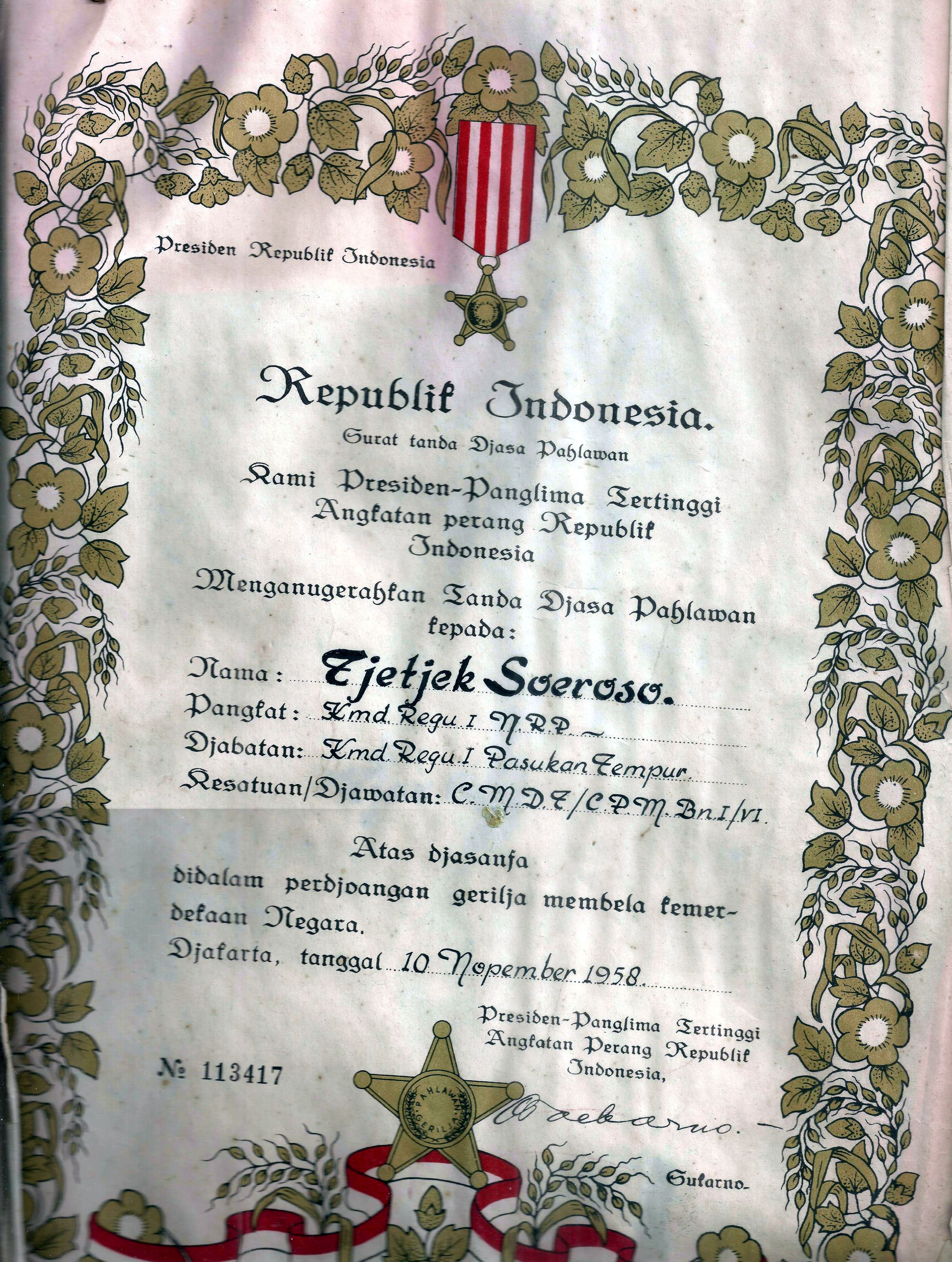
Diploma of Bintang Gerilya

The "Guerrilla Star" (BG) is awarded to a military serviceman/servicewoman who has given extraordinary service to fight in order to maintain the sovereignty of Republic of Indonesia from foreign aggression. It is the highest of all military gallantry decorations of the Republic. Most BG recipients are military personnel involved in the Indonesian National Revolution.

Bintang Gerilya

===== Bintang Sakti (The Sacred Star) =====
"The Sacred Star" (BS) is awarded to personnel of the Indonesian National Armed Forces who distinguished themselves by acts of valor and beyond the call of duty during military operations. The BS can also be awarded to any civilian for extraordinary service and acts of valor beyond the call of duty in the same circumstances.

Bintang Sakti

===== Bintang Dharma (Military Distinguished Service Star) =====
The "Military Distinguished Service Star" (BD) is awarded to armed forces personnel and civilians for extraordinary service and actions beyond the call of duty during military operations and contingencies which helps promote and achieve the advancement of the Indonesian National Armed Forces.

Bintang Dharma

===== Bintang Yudha Dharma (Grand Meritorious Military Order Star) =====
The "Grand Meritorious Military Order Star" (BYD) is awarded to personnel of the Indonesian National Armed Forces, any civil servant of ministry of defence or any citizen or foreigner for extraordinary service and on beyond the call of duty for the supervision, development and conduct of any action or activity which can provide extraordinary benefits for the government, people and the Republic of Indonesia, most especially in the field of national defense. In practice, 1st class BYD is usually awarded to visiting foreign chiefs of defense when in visits to the country.

The BYD is awarded in 3 classes:

1st Class	Bintang Yudha Dharma Utama	Awarded to Minister of Defence and Commander of National Armed Forces
2nd Class	Bintang Yudha Dharma Pratama	Awarded to 2-star officer and above who serve in national armed force HQ, ministry of defense, or defense branch HQ
3rd Class	Bintang Yudha Dharma Nararya	Awarded to star officer and senior officer who serve in joint staff position

The ribbons of the 2nd and 1st Classes are identical, with the addition of (respectively) one and two central narrow red stripes.

===== Bintang Kartika Eka Paksi (Army Meritorious Service Star) =====
The "Army Meritorious Service Star" (BKEP) is awarded to personnel of the Indonesian Army for meritorious service and beyond the call of duty for advancement of the Indonesian Army. The BKEP can also be awarded to civilians who provide extraordinary service for advancement of the Indonesian Army.

The BKEP is awarded in 3 classes:

1st Class	Bintang Kartika Eka Paksi Utama	Awarded to Minister of Defence, Commander of National Armed Forces and Chief of Staff of the Army
2nd Class	Bintang Kartika Eka Paksi Pratama	Awarded to Deputy Chief of Staff and qualified 2-star army officer who have received 3rd class of BKEP
3rd Class	Bintang Kartika Eka Paksi Nararya	Awarded all army personnel who have received Satyalancana Kesetiaan 24 years' service

===== Bintang Jalasena (Navy Meritorious Service Star) =====
The "Navy Meritorious Service Star" (BJSN) is awarded to personnel of the Indonesian Navy for meritorious service and beyond the call of duty for advancement of the Indonesian Navy. The BJSN can also be awarded to civilians who provide extraordinary service for advancement of the Indonesian Navy.

The BJSN is awarded in 3 classes:

1st Class	Bintang Jalasena Utama	Awarded to Minister of Defence, Commander of National Armed Forces and Chief of Staff of the Navy
2nd Class	Bintang Jalasena Pratama	Awarded to deputy chief of staff and qualified 2-star navy officer who have received 3rd class of BJSN
3rd Class	Bintang Jalasena Nararya	Awarded all navy personnel who have received Satyalancana Kesetiaan 24 years' service

===== Bintang Swa Bhuwana Paksa (Air Force Meritorious Service Star) =====
The "Air Force Meritorious Service Star" (BSBP) is awarded to personnel of the Indonesian Air Force for meritorious service and beyond the call of duty for advancement of the Indonesian Air Force. The BSBP can also be awarded to civilians who provide extraordinary service for advancement of the Indonesian Air Force.

The BSBP is awarded in 3 classes:

1st Class	Bintang Swa Bhuwana Paksa Utama	Awarded to Minister of Defence, Commander of National Armed Forces and Chief of Staff of the Air Force
2nd Class	Bintang Swa Bhuwana Paksa Pratama	Awarded to deputy chief of staff and qualified 2-star air force officer who have received 3rd class of BSBP
3rd Class	Bintang Swa Bhuwana Paksa Nararya	Awarded all air force personnel who have received Satyalancana Kesetiaan 24 years' service

=== Satyalancana ===
Refer to Law no. 20/2009, Satyalancana is round-shaped medal to be awarded by the Government of Indonesia for distinguished individual. In order to execute further the mechanisms of the said Law, the Government of Indonesia passed the Government Regulation no. 35/2010 which stipulates the titles of the Satyalancanas that may be awarded, regulates the process of awarding, the manners of wearing and respecting the decorations.

There are two classifications of Satyalancanas; 20 Satyalancanas are awarded for civilians (which also includes members of the Indonesian National Police), and 13 Satyalancanas are reserved for members of the Indonesian National Armed Forces. Some of the Satyalancanas may also be awarded to foreign nationals, and may be awarded posthumously.

==== Satyalancana for Civilians ====
===== Satyalancana Perintis Kemerdekaan (Medal for Independence Freedom Fighters) =====
Awarded to any founders or leaders of Indonesian independence movements/organizations for their contributions in the past to foster awareness of the Indonesian national identity, struggled for independence to the brink of being sentenced to prison by the colonial government, or actively opposed colonialism while not opposing the Indonesian state or its government.

Satyalancana Perintis Kemerdekaan

===== Satyalancana Pembangunan (Medal for Contributing in the National Development) =====
Awarded to distinguished individuals for their contribution as a whole or in specific sectors or issues for helping the development of the nation.

Satyalancana Pembangunan

===== Satyalancana Wira Karya (Medal for Providing an Example of Meritorious Personality) =====
Awarded to distinguished individuals for the service to the country and become a role model in their field. The elucidation of Government Regulation num. 35 of the Year 2010 provides that the Satyalancana Wira Karya is awarded to anyone without discriminating their social strata or the sects that they belong.

Satyalancana Wira Karya

===== Satyalancana Kebaktian Sosial (Medal for Service in the Field of Social Welfare) =====
Awarded to distinguished individuals for their service in social welfare and humanitarianism among the Indonesian people, such as alleviating poverty, providing assistance for orphaned children, and empowering persons with disabilities.

Satyalancana Kebaktian Sosial

===== Satyalancana Kebudayaan (Medal for Service in National Culture) =====
Awarded to distinguished individuals for their service in upholding Indonesian culture and the arts.

Satyalancana Kebudayaan

===== Satyalancana Pendidikan (Medal for Service in the Field of Education) =====
Awarded to educators and education staffs for dedicated service in the field of both formal or non-formal education who has served:

- at least 30 days uninterrupted or 90 days with interruptions, or who has died due to natural or social disasters in an Indonesian region,
- at least 3 years uninterrupted or 6 years with interruptions in a remote and disadvantaged region of Indonesia,
- at least 5 years uninterrupted or 8 years with interruptions in a backwarded society such as traditional tribes or in a border region with another country, and
- at least 8 years uninterrupted, with a distinctive achievement in the field of education recognized by society, the Indonesian government, or a national or international institution.

Satyalancana Pendidikan

===== Satyalancana Karya Satya (Civil Servants' Long Service Medal) =====
Awarded to distinguished civil servants for loyal and faithful service and dedication in Indonesian civil services spanning decades. To be awarded this Satyalancana, a civil servant qualified for the medal must have the following requirements:

- not have a record of severe or medium-level punishment according to present Indonesian laws, or not take any leave that is not financially paid by the state,
- be counted in 10, 20, or 30 years since completing a severe or medium-level punishment and has returned to normal civil services duty, or
- be counted in 10, 20, or 30 years since the appointment as a civil servant probationer

The Satyalancana Karya Satya is awarded in 3 classes:

1st Class	Satyalancana Karya Satya for 30 years of service
2nd Class	Satyalancana Karya Satya for 20 years of service
3rd Class	Satyalancana Karya Satya for 10 years of service

Note: All classes of Satyalancana Karya Satya medal have exactly same medal design and ribbon, the difference is only color of medal.

===== Satyalancana Dharma Olahraga (Medal for Contribution in Sports) =====
Awarded to distinguished athletes, coaches, judges and sports officials for their meritorious service and dedication towards the advancement and progress of Indonesian sports and also for achievements made for the country in major international sporting events.

Satyalancana Dharma Olahraga

===== Satyalancana Dharma Pemuda (Medal for Youth Contribution) =====
Awarded to boys and girls aged 16–30 years old for their contributed to the empowerment and development of youths in Indonesia, or for those who have been awarded for their extraordinary achievements at the national level. Being an inspiration to fellow youths is considered a bonus point.

Satyalancana Dharma Pemuda

===== Satyalancana Kepariwisataan (Medal for Tourism) =====
Awarded to distinguished individuals for their service in developing Indonesia's tourism.

Satyalancana Kepariwisataan

===== Satyalancana Karya Bhakti Praja Nugraha (Medal for Improving Regional Governance) =====
Awarded to regional government administrators or employees for their service or performance in realizing an effective governance in regional (provincial or municipal) or community levels.

Satyalancana Karya Bhakti Praja Nugraha

===== Satyalancana Pengabdian (Police Long Service Medal) =====
Awarded to distinguished personnel of the Indonesian National Police for years of loyal and faithful service and dedication.

The Satyalancana Pengabdian is awarded in 4 category:

1st Class	Satyalancana Pengabdian for 32 years of service
2nd Class	Satyalancana Pengabdian for 24 years of service
3rd Class	Satyalancana Pengabdian for 16 years of service
4th Class	Satyalancana Pengabdian for 8 years of service

===== Satyalancana Bhakti Pendidikan (Medal for Police Education) =====
Awarded to any personnel of the Indonesian National Police for dedicated service as educators in a police education institution or other education institutions outside the Indonesian National Police for a minimum of 2 years uninterrupted or 3 years with interruptions. This Satyalancana may also be awarded to any Indonesian and foreign nationals outside the Indonesian National Police who has served as educators or collaborated in the field of police education, scientific research and development for a minimum of 1 year uninterrupted or 2 years with interruptions.

Satyalancana Bhakti Pendidikan

===== Satyalancana Jana Utama (Medal for Advancing Police Organization) =====
Awarded to personnel of the Indonesian National Police with a minimum of 8 years of dedicated service in the field of public security and order in advancing the organization of the Indonesian National Police, and Indonesian nationals outside the Indonesian National Police with the same contribution.

Satyalancana Jana Utama

===== Satyalancana Ksatria Bhayangkara (Medal for Meritious Policing Duty) =====
Awarded to distinguished personnel of the Indonesian National Police for their performance as law enforcers and civil assistance apparatus, and fulfilling professionalism and work ethics in their duty as a police.

Satyalancana Ksatria Bhayangkara

===== Satyalancana Karya Bhakti (Medal for Concrete Work in the Police Force) =====
Awarded to personnel of the Indonesian National Police for a concrete work—in policy or in active duty—which advance the work of the National Police and of its mandate, honor the history and heritage of the National Police, and help uphold the values and importance of the organization for the security and welfare of the people.

Satyalancana Karya Bhakti

===== Satyalancana Operasi Kepolisian (Medal for Police Operation) =====
Awarded to personnel of the Indonesian National Police who were wounded or killed during a police operation, or who has completed a mission of utmost national significance.

Satyalancana Operasi Kepolisian

===== Satyalancana Bhakti Buana (Medal for Police Duty in International Peacekeeping) =====
Awarded to personnel of the Indonesian National Police for police service in overseas territory or in any peacekeeping operation as may be permitted by the National Police.

Satyalancana Bhakti Buana

===== Satyalancana Bhakti Nusa (Medal for Police Duty in Remote Regions) =====
Awarded to personnel of the Indonesian National Police for their duty in a remote area or an Indonesian border region.

Satyalancana Bhakti Nusa

===== Satyalancana Bhakti Purna (Medal for 32 Years of Police Service) =====
Awarded to personnel of the Indonesian National Police for 32 years of service and dedication.

Satyalancana Bhakti Purna

==== Satyalancana for military service ====
===== Satyalancana Bhakti (Wounds Medal) =====
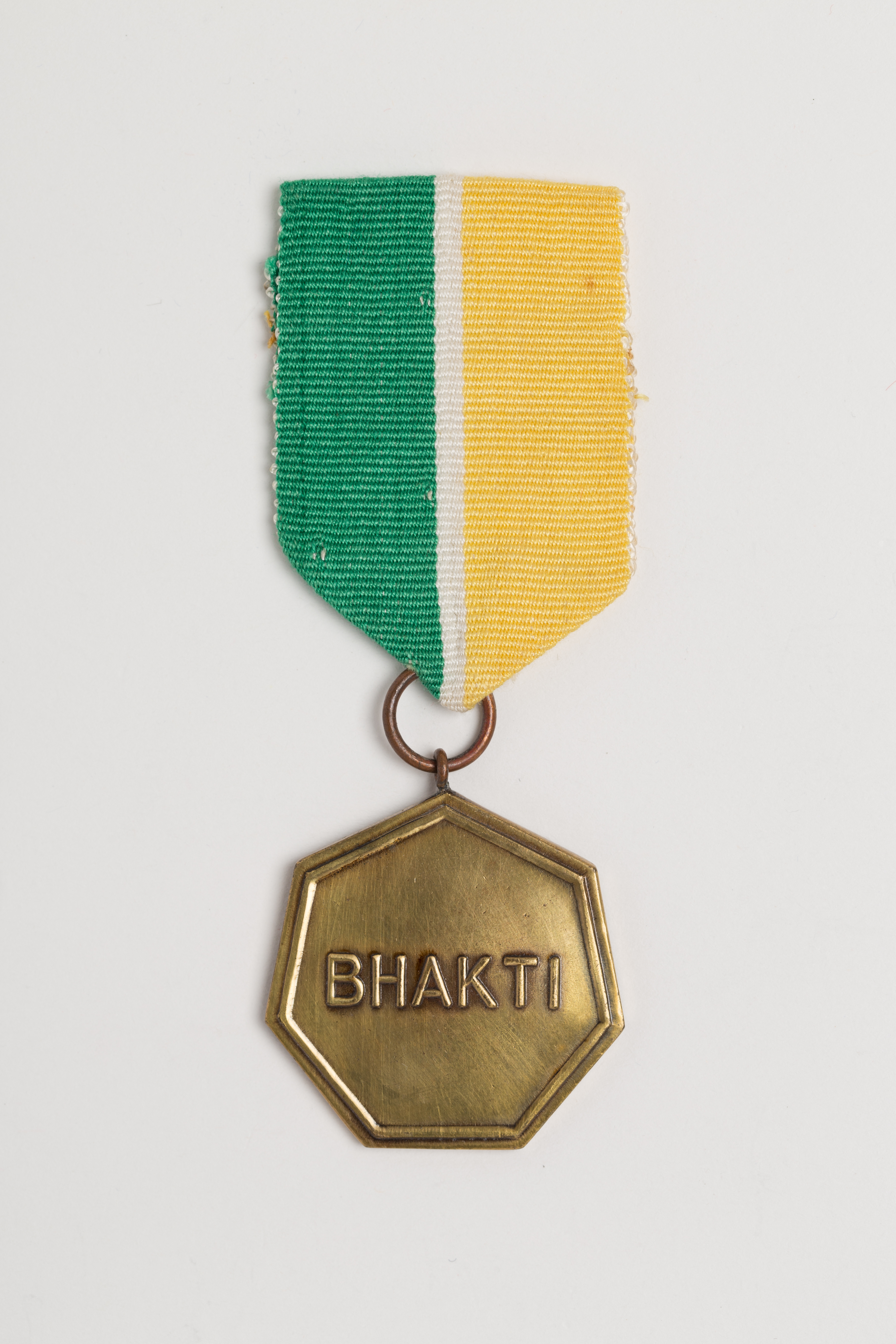
Satyalancana Bhakti

Awarded to individual or personnel of the Indonesian National Armed Forces who are deemed worthy to receive it, because of combat injuries sustained due to enemy action during military operations.

Satyalencana Bhakti

===== Satyalancana Teladan (Medal for Active Military Campaign) =====
Awarded to any serving personnel of the Indonesian National Armed Forces with a minimum of 1 year uninterrupted service or 3 years of service with interruptions while in performance of national defense responsibilities on any military campaign or operation as may be ordered by the Commander of the National Armed Forces and/or the respective Chiefs of Staff of the service branches of the armed forces wherein he or she is assigned. This Satyalancana can be awarded to the same person more than once.

Satyalancana Teladan

===== Satyalancana Kesetiaan (Armed Forces Long Service Medal) =====
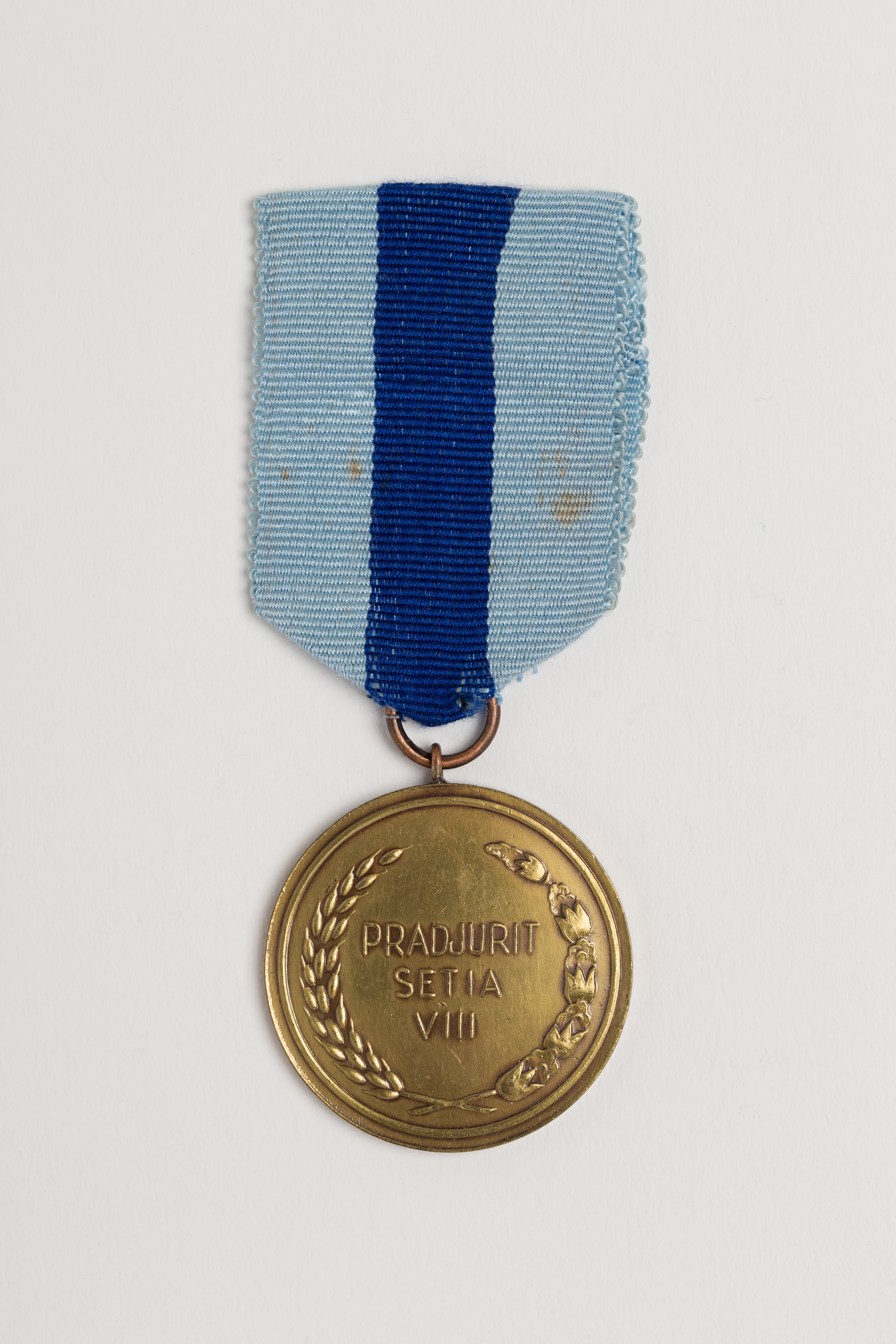
Old version of Satyalancana Kesetiaan VIII Tahun

Awarded personnel of the Indonesian National Armed Forces for years of loyal and faithful service. This is one of only few awards that may be bestowed upon both enlisted personnel and officers of the Armed Forces

The Satyalancana Kesetiaan is awarded in 4 classes:

1st Class	Satyalancana Kesetiaan for 32 years of service
2nd Class	Satyalancana Kesetiaan for 24 years of service
3rd Class	Satyalancana Kesetiaan for 16 years of service
4th Class	Satyalancana Kesetiaan for 8 years of service

===== Satyalancana Santi Dharma (Medal for Active International Military Duty) =====
Awarded to personnel of the Indonesian National Armed Forces for service as part of a UN peacekeeping force or as wartime foreign military observers during conflicts.

Satyalancana Santi Dharma

===== Satyalancana Dwidya Sistha (Medal for Service as a Military Educator) =====
Awarded to personnel of the Indonesian National Armed Forces for service as instructors at the Military Academies or military recruit training units in any service branch, and to personnel with active duty in any education institutions. This Satyalancana may also be awarded to Indonesian and foreign nationals outside the Indonesian National Armed Forces who also has given contribution in Indonesian military education.

Satyalancana Dwidya Sistha

===== Satyalancana Dharma Nusa (National Defense Service Medal) =====
Awarded to personnel of the Indonesian National Armed Forces or Indonesian National Police, civil servants for their active duty in restoring Indonesian territorial defense or public security, and other Indonesian nationals for the same duty in a zone of conflict inside Indonesian borders. This Satyalancana is awarded to the said individual who as a minimum service time of 90 days uninterrupted or 120 days with interruptions, and may be awarded posthumously.

Satyalancana Dharma Nusa

===== Satyalancana Dharma Bantala (Medal for Active Duty in the Army) =====
Awarded to personnel of the Indonesian Army for a minimum of 30 years of loyal and faithful service and dedication, or for those who has been awarded the Satyalancana Kesetiaan, 2nd Class. This Satyalancana may be awarded posthumously.

Satyalancana Dharma Bantala

===== Satyalancana Dharma Samudra (Medal for Active Duty in the Navy) =====
Awarded to personnel of the Indonesian Navy for a minimum of 30 years of loyal and faithful service and dedication, or for those who has been awarded the Satyalancana Kesetiaan, 2nd Class. This Satyalancana may be awarded posthumously.

Satyalancana Dharma Samudra

===== Satyalancana Dharma Dirgantara (Medal for Active Duty in the Air Force) =====
Awarded to personnel of the Indonesian Air Force for a minimum of 30 years of loyal and faithful service and dedication, or for those who has been awarded the Satyalancana Kesetiaan, 2nd Class. This Satyalancana may be awarded posthumously.

Satyalancana Dharma Dirgantara

===== Satyalancana Wira Nusa (Medal for Active Duty in Indonesia's Outer Islands) =====
Awarded to personnel of the Indonesian National Armed Forces for service in outermost islands of Indonesia for 90 days uninterrupted or 120 days with interruptions. This Satyalancana may be awarded to the same person two times.

Satyalancana Wira Nusa

===== Satyalancana Wira Dharma (Medal for Active Duty as a Border Guard) =====
Awarded to personnel of the Indonesian National Armed Forces for service as a Border Guard Task Force personnel for 90 days uninterrupted or 120 days with interruptions. This Satyalancana may be awarded to the same person two times.

Satyalancana Wira Dharma

===== Satyalancana Wira Siaga (Medal for Presidential and Vice Presidential Guards Personnel) =====
Awarded to personnel of the Indonesian National Armed Forces for service in the Paspampres, the unit of the Indonesian National Armed Forces tasked for protecting the President and Vice President of Indonesia, and former Presidents and Vice Presidents, as well as the facilities related to and connected to the offices of the presidency and vice presidency. To be awarded this Satyalancana, any qualified personnel of the Paspampres must be:

- General officer (generals, admirals, or air force marshals) with a minimum of 1 year of service,
- Field or junior officer (from colonel to second lieutenant rank) with a minimum of 2 years uninterrupted service or 3 years of service with interruptions, and
- Non-commissioned officer or enlisted (below second lieutenant) with a minimum of 3 years uninterrupted service or 4 years of service with interruptions.

Satyalancana Wira Siaga

===== Satyalancana Ksatria Yudha (Military Special Forces Service Medal) =====
Awarded to personnel, officers, NCOs and enlisted alike, of the Indonesian National Armed Forces with a minimum of 2 years uninterrupted service or 3 years of service with interruptions in the special forces units, or to the said personnel who has excelled in performing his/her duty in these special formations that resulted in either physical or mental injury, handicap, or even death in the performance of his/her service.

Satyalancana Ksatria Yudha

=== Samkaryanugraha (Citation Awards) ===
Samkaryanugraha is award in the form of distinction trophy/pennant for any military or police formation, governmental institution, or other organization with meritorious services. All the Samkaryanugraha has equal ranking, and is classified into civilian and military organizational awards. The object of the award must be put on display at the building of the receiving unit, institution, or organization.

==== Parasamya Purnakarya Nugraha (Organizational Award for Civilian Institutions) ====
The Parasamya Purnakarya Nugraha is an organizational award given by or in behalf of the President of the Republic of Indonesia for meritorious service and dedication of a governmental institution (such as provincial or municipal governments) or civilian organization. The recipient of the Parasamya Purnakarya Nugraha award receives a distinction trophy that resembles a miniature monument with the Garuda Pancasila emblem.

==== Nugraha Sakanti (National Police Unit Award Citation) ====
The Nugraha Sakanti is an organizational award given by or in behalf of the President of the Republic of Indonesia for meritorious service and dedication of units within the Indonesian National Police for the sake of upholding law and order, protecting the citizenry of the Republic, community development, civil assistance and in the performance of actions for the benefit of the people's well-being and safety. The recipient unit or police institution of the Nugraha Sakanti citation award receives a black triangular distinction pennant with the Garuda Pancasila emblem on its hoist.

==== Samkaryanugraha (National Armed Forces Unit Award Citation) ====
The Samkaryanugraha is an organizational award given by or in behalf of the President of the Republic of Indonesia - in his/her capacity as Commander in Chief - for meritorious service and dedication of units within the Indonesian National Armed Forces for the sake of the performance of its mandate of national defense, community development and in civil assistance operations during calamities and major national, regional and local events. It is the only organizational award by law to not be given a distinct name. The recipient unit or military institution of the Samkaryanugraha award receives a golden-coloured distinction rectangular pennant with the inscriptions in Indonesian on it with gold fringe, alongside the national emblem and the Presidential seal.

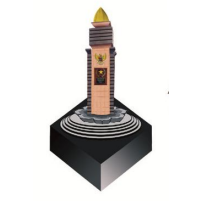
Trophy for the Parasamya Purnakarya Nugraha

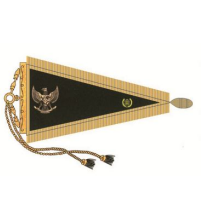
Pennant for the Nugraha Sakanti

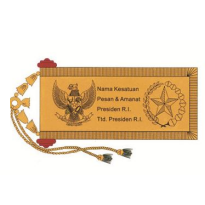
Pennant for the Samkaryanugraha

== Obsolete Stars and Medals ==
=== Obsolete decorations for civil service ===
Name	Ribbon	Class	Notes
Satyalancana Peringatan Perjuangan Kemerdekaan; Independence Effort Commemoration Medal			Awarded to all civil servants who continuously serve during the early days of Republic of Indonesia starting from 17 August 1945 to 7 December 1949.
Satyalancana Keamanan; Civilian Security Medal			Awarded to any Indonesian national who is not member of the armed forces and participate in activities in the framework of security recovery in the region declared unsafe by officials.
Satyalancana Pepera "Act of Free Choice" Medal			Awarded to any Indonesian national for their service during Act of Free Choice, between 1 January 1969 to 2 August 1969.
Satyalancana Karya Satya		I	
Satyalancana Karya Satya		II	
Satyalancana Karya Satya		III	
Satyalancana Karya Satya		IV	
Satyalancana Karya Satya		V	
Satyalancana Prasetya Pancawarsa			Replaced to Satyalancana Pengabdian
Satyalancana Satya Dasawarsa			
Satyalancana Ksatriya Tamtama			Replaced to Satyalancana Ksatria Bhayangkara

=== Obsolete decorations for military service ===
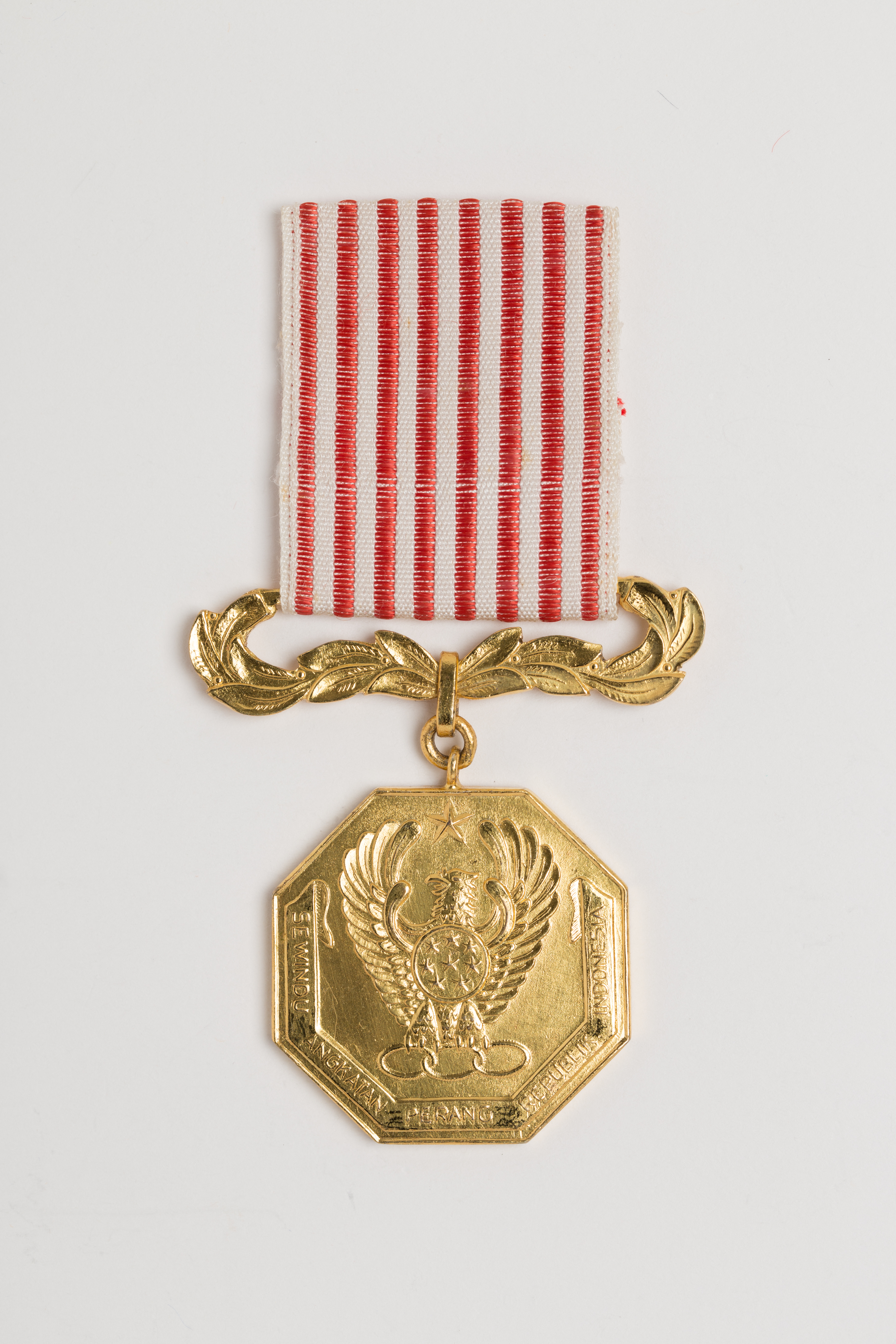
Bintang Sewindu Angkatan Perang

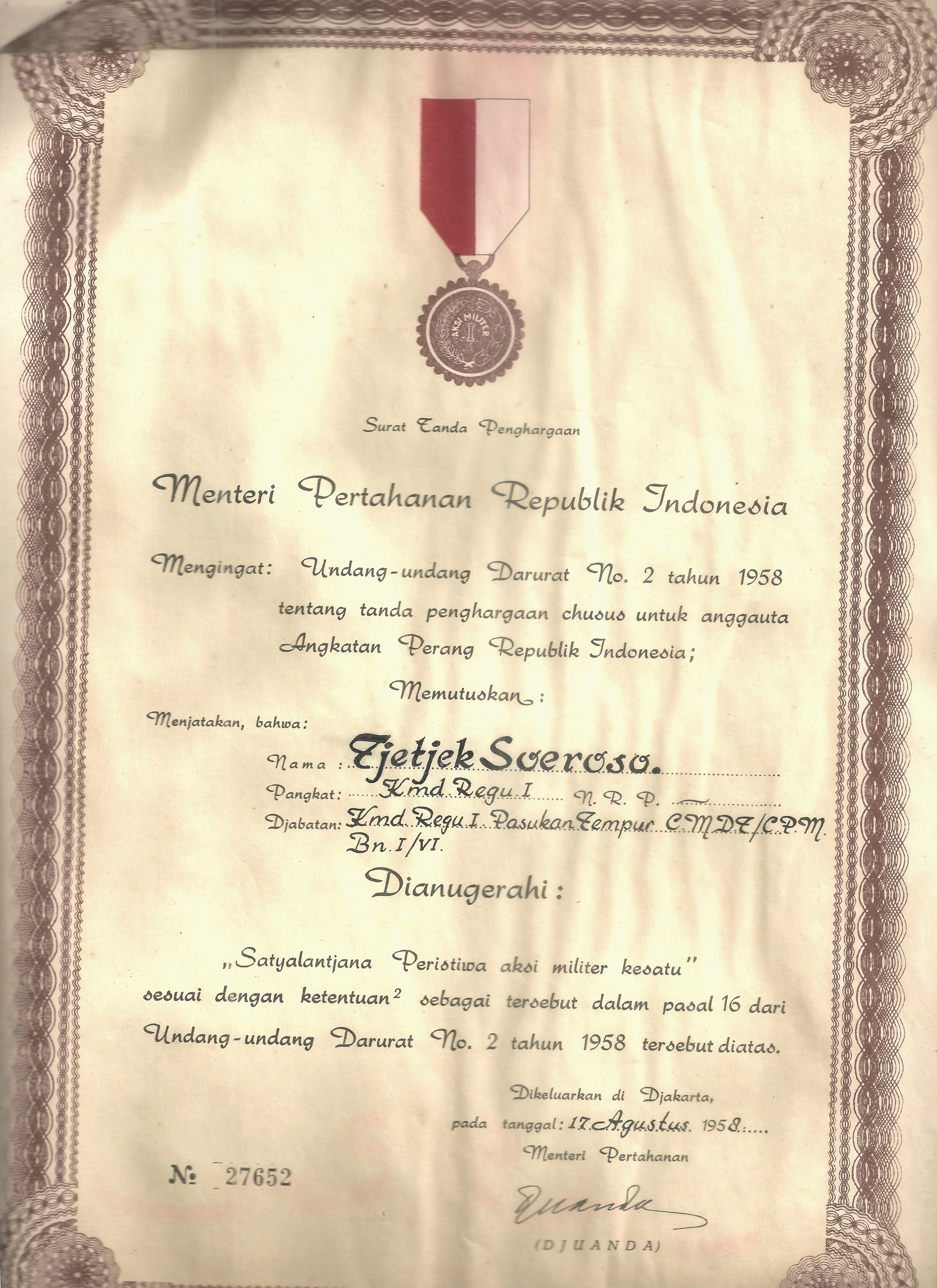
Diploma of Satyalancana Peristiwa Aksi Militer I

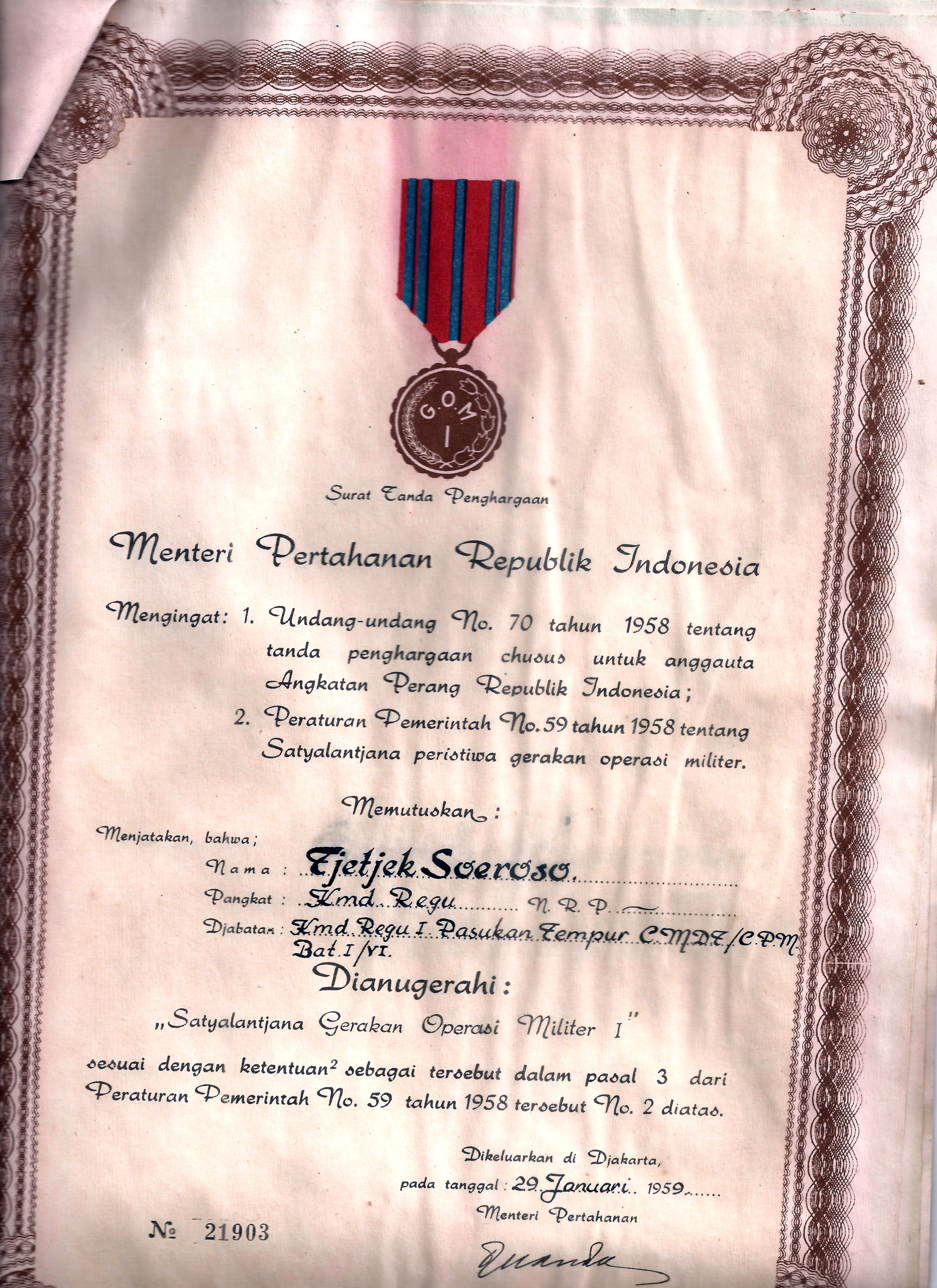
Diploma of Satyalancana GOM I

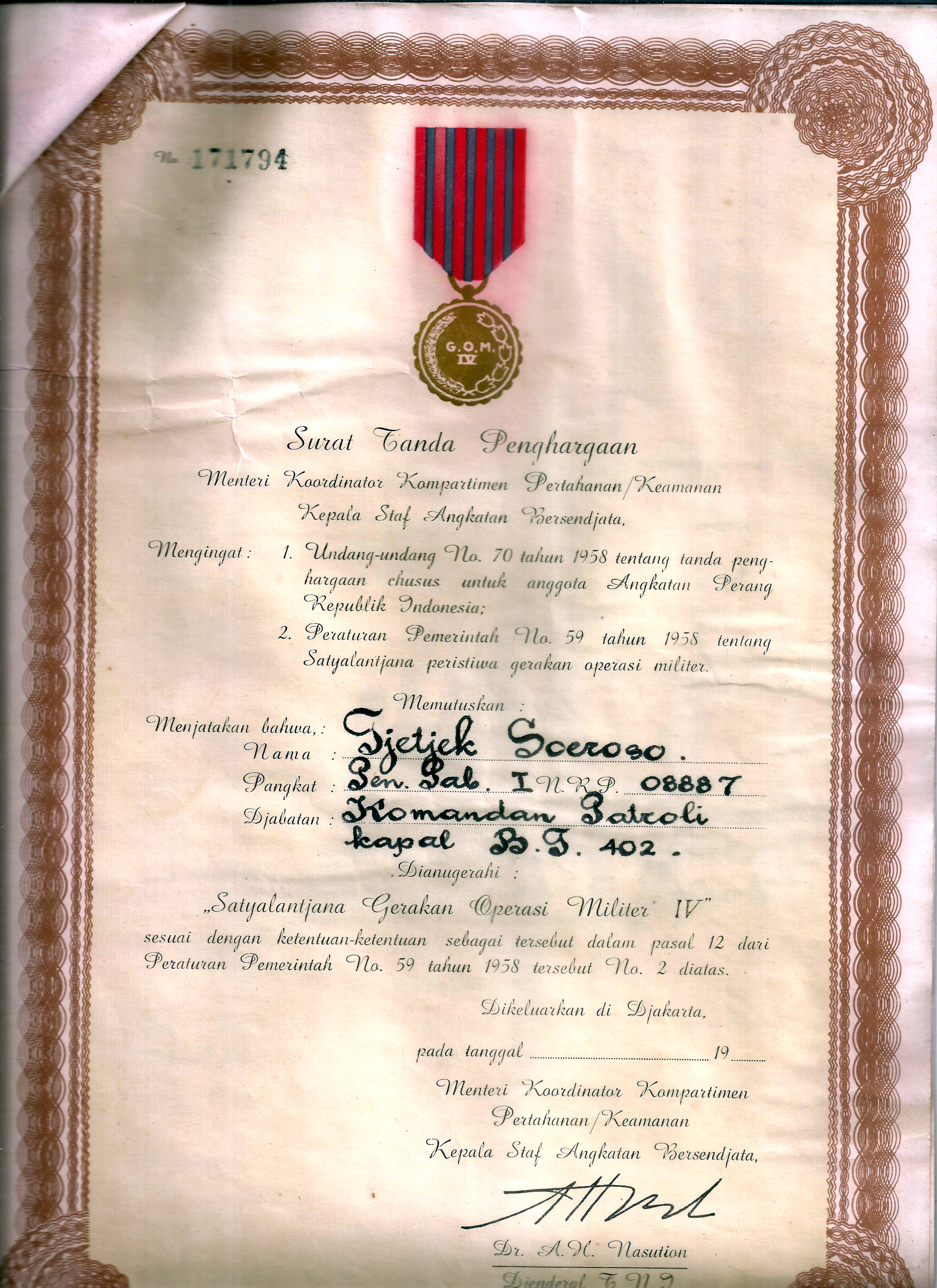
Diploma of Satyalancana GOM IV

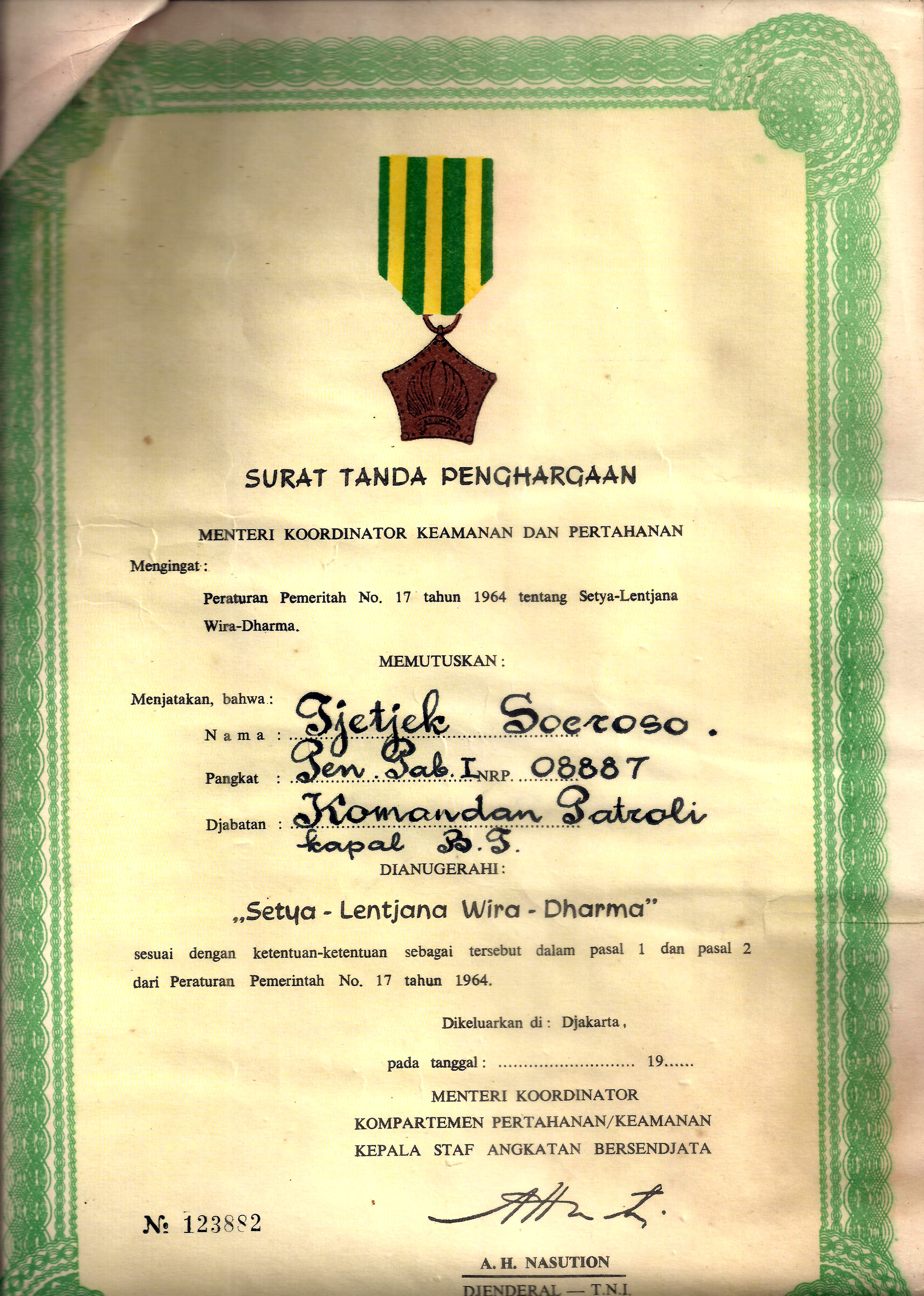
Diploma of Satyalancana Wira Dharma

Name	Ribbon	Class	Notes
Bintang Garuda; Garuda Star			Awarded to the Air Force personnel served in the independence war between 1945 and 1949. No longer awarded and extinct since 2009.
Bintang Sewindu Angkatan Perang; Armed Forces Eight Years’ Service Star			Awarded in 1953 to mark the 8th year or windu year since the foundation of the Indonesian National Armed Forces. Bintang Sewindu Angkatan Perang is awarded to all active military personnel who continuously serve from 5 October 1945 to 5 October 1953. No longer awarded and extinct since 2009.
Satyalancana Peristiwa Aksi Militer I Campaign/Battlefield Commemoration Medals I (Dutch Military Aggression I)			Dormant award. Awarded to personnel of the Armed Forces and Police for gallant participation in military operations as may be ordered by the government through the National Armed Forces/National Police General Headquarters.
Satyalancana Peristiwa Aksi Militer II; Campaign/Battlefield Commemoration Medals II (Dutch Military Aggression II)			Dormant award. Awarded to personnel of the Armed Forces and Police for gallant participation in military operations as may be ordered by the government through the National Armed Forces/National Police General Headquarters.
Satyalancana Gerakan Operasi Militer I (Madiun Affair); Military Operations Service Medals I			Dormant award. This one of few awards which may bestowed upon all personnel of the armed forces and the National Police Mobile Brigade regardless of rank held upon the issuance of the medal. Awarded on behalf of the Republic for successful conduct and service rendered during military operations as may be ordered by the Government of the Republic, together with the National Armed Forces and the Police.
Satyalancana Gerakan Operasi Militer II (APRA coup d'état)			Dormant award. This one of few awards which may bestowed upon all personnel of the armed forces and the National Police Mobile Brigade regardless of rank held upon the issuance of the medal. Awarded on behalf of the Republic for successful conduct and service rendered during military operations as may be ordered by the Government of the Republic, together with the National Armed Forces and the Police.
Satyalancana Gerakan Operasi Militer III (Invasion of Ambon)			Dormant award. This one of few awards which may bestowed upon all personnel of the armed forces and the National Police Mobile Brigade regardless of rank held upon the issuance of the medal. Awarded on behalf of the Republic for successful conduct and service rendered during military operations as may be ordered by the Government of the Republic, together with the National Armed Forces and the Police.
Satyalancana Gerakan Operasi Militer IV (Darul Islam rebellion South Sulawesi chapter)			Dormant award. This one of few awards which may bestowed upon all personnel of the armed forces and the National Police Mobile Brigade regardless of rank held upon the issuance of the medal. Awarded on behalf of the Republic for successful conduct and service rendered during military operations as may be ordered by the Government of the Republic, together with the National Armed Forces and the Police.
Satyalancana Gerakan Operasi Militer V (Darul Islam rebellion West Java chapter)			Dormant award. This one of few awards which may bestowed upon all personnel of the armed forces and the National Police Mobile Brigade regardless of rank held upon the issuance of the medal. Awarded on behalf of the Republic for successful conduct and service rendered during military operations as may be ordered by the Government of the Republic, together with the National Armed Forces and the Police.
Satyalancana Gerakan Operasi Militer VI (Angkatan Umat Islam rebellion)			Dormant award. This one of few awards which may bestowed upon all personnel of the armed forces and the National Police Mobile Brigade regardless of rank held upon the issuance of the medal. Awarded on behalf of the Republic for successful conduct and service rendered during military operations as may be ordered by the Government of the Republic, together with the National Armed Forces and the Police.
Satyalancana Gerakan Operasi Militer VII (Darul Islam rebellion Aceh chapter)			Dormant award. This one of few awards which may bestowed upon all personnel of the armed forces and the National Police Mobile Brigade regardless of rank held upon the issuance of the medal. Awarded on behalf of the Republic for successful conduct and service rendered during military operations as may be ordered by the Government of the Republic, together with the National Armed Forces and the Police.
Satyalancana Gerakan Operasi Militer VIII (Communist insurgency in Sarawak)			Also known as Satyalancana Dharma Phala.
Satyalancana Gerakan Operasi Militer IX (Operation Trikora)			Also known as Satyalancana Raksaka Dharma.
Satyalancana Penegak; Medal for Combat Against Communists			No longer awarded since massive extermination program for communist insurgency in 1965-1966 and the fall of Sukarno's old order regime in 1967. Awarded to National Armed Forces and National Police personnel, regardless of rank, for active service in actions against the Communist Party of Indonesia, paramilitaries, and CPI-linked affiliated organizations.
Satyalancana Seroja; Timor Military Campaign Medal			Obsolete award and extinct following secession of East Timor from Indonesia. Awarded on behalf of the Republic for successful conduct and service rendered during the 1975 Indonesian invasion of East Timor and its subsequent Indonesian rule. This one of few awards which may bestowed upon all personnel of the armed forces and the National Police Mobile Brigade regardless of rank held upon the issuance of the medal.
Satyalancana Wira Dharma; Malaysia/Northern Borneo Military Campaign Medal			Obsolete award and extinct following the collapse of Sukarno regime who failed to prevent Malaya Federation gaining independence and normalization diplomatic relationship between Indonesia and Malaysia. Awarded to National Armed Force and National Police personnel for service in Konfrontasi. This is one of only few awards that may be bestowed upon enlisted personnel of the Armed Forces. The name of this award is still being used today, albeit different purpose and award/ribbon design.
Satyalancana Saptamarga; PRRI Military Campaign Medal			Extinct Award. Awarded to personnel of the Armed Forces and Police for participation in military operations against Revolutionary Government of the Republic of Indonesia.
Satyalancana Satya Dharma; West Guinea Military Campaign Medal			Extinct Award. Awarded to personnel of the Armed Forces and Police for participation in West New Guinea dispute.
Satyalancana Jasadharma Angkatan Laut; Navy Establishment Medal			Extinct Award. Awarded to any citizen of Indonesia and non-personnel of the Indonesian Navy for their service in the establishment of the Indonesian Navy.
Satyalancana Yuda Tama Angkatan Laut Republik Indonesia		I	Obsolete award. Awarded to Indonesian Navy personnel, except Marine Corps, who has given extraordinary service for the Navy, divided into 1st and 2nd Classes, respectively.
Satyalancana Yuda Tama Angkatan Laut Republik Indonesia		II	Obsolete award. Awarded to Indonesian Navy personnel, except Marine Corps, who has given extraordinary service for the Navy, divided into 1st and 2nd Classes, respectively.
Satyalancana Yuda Tama Korps Komando Angkatan Laut Republik Indonesia		I	Obsolete award. Awarded to Indonesian Marine Corps personnel, who has given extraordinary service for the Navy, divided into 1st and 2nd Classes, respectively.
Satyalancana Yuda Tama Korps Komando Angkatan Laut Republik Indonesia		II	Obsolete award. Awarded to Indonesian Marine Corps personnel, who has given extraordinary service for the Navy, divided into 1st and 2nd Classes, respectively.
