= Indonesian Naval Academy =

Naval Academy
- Akademi Angkatan Laut
- Motto: Hree Dharma Shanti
- Motto in English: Embarrassed of doing defects
- Type: Service academy
- Established: 10 October 1951; 75 years ago
- Affiliations: Indonesian National Armed Forces Academy System
- Superintendent: RADM Supardi, S.E., M.B.A., CHRMP.
- Dean: BGEN (M) Gatot Mardiyono, S.H., M.Tr.Opsla.
- Location: Surabaya, East Java, Indonesia
- Colors: Blue and White
- Mascots: Shark and Seal
- Website: www.aal.ac.id

The Naval Academy (Indonesian: Akademi Angkatan Laut or AAL) is a service academy of the Indonesian Navy, the naval component of the Indonesian National Armed Forces Academy System or the AKABRI. Its campus is located in Surabaya, East Java and trains men and women to become officers of the Navy, including the Indonesian Marine Corps, Fleet Forces, Naval Aviation and support branches.

== History ==
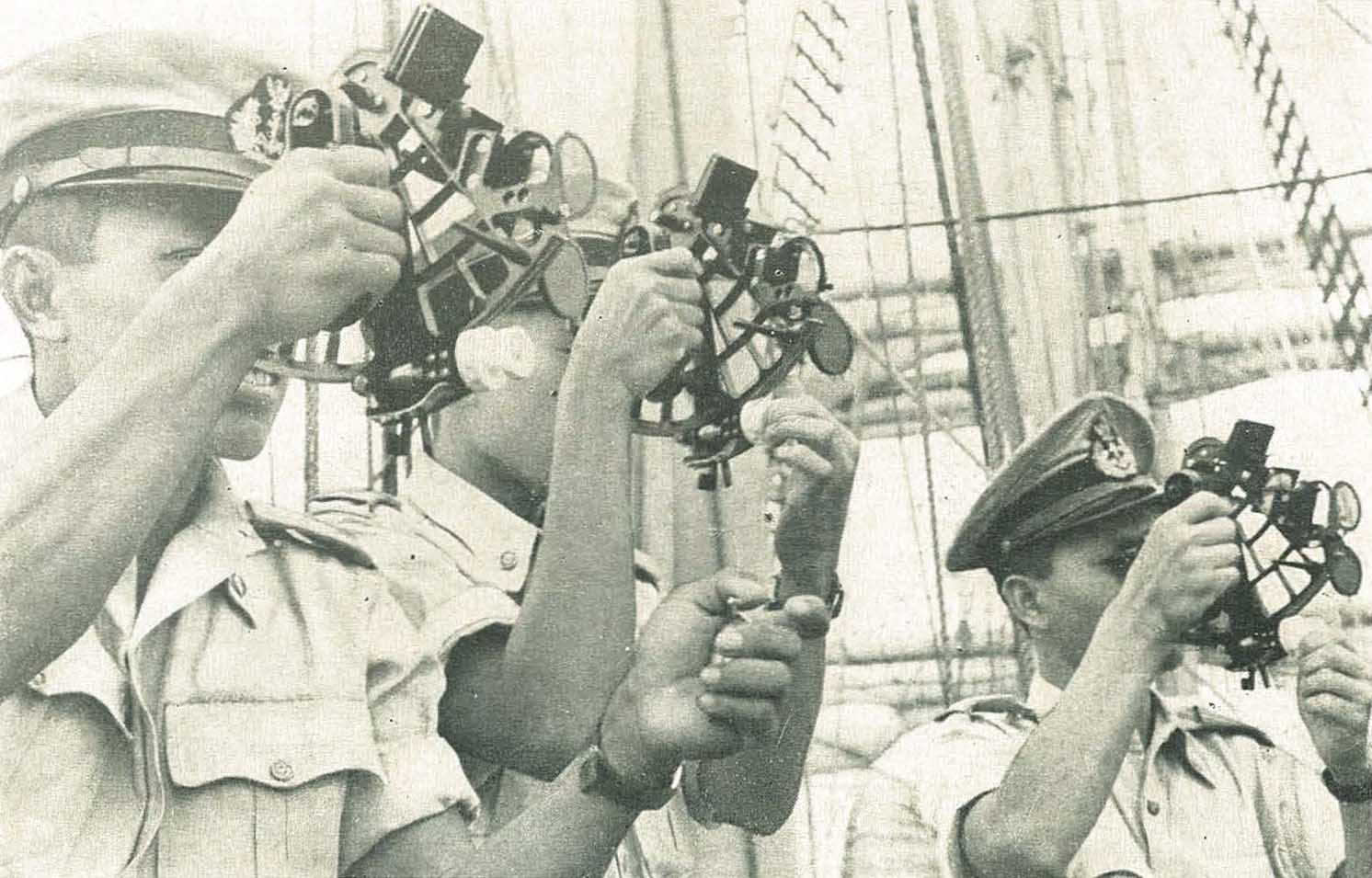
Indonesian Navy cadets with Sextants

The Naval Academy opened its doors on 10 October 1951 as the Naval Institute of Surabaya (Institut Angkatan Laut), its creation sanctioned by Ministerial Decree D/MP/279/1951 dated 29 June 1951 and Ministerial Decree D/MP/313/51 dated 28 July 1951 of the Ministry of Defense. Major R. S. Hadiwinarso was its first superintendent. President Sukarno, provincial and city leaders were present during its inauguration in a location that was recently acquired by the national government.

The academy's first battalion of naval cadets were made up of officer cadets of the sea services and support branches, and by 1952 had opened its doors to cadets of the electronics branches and the Marine Corps. By 1954, the Navy set a 3-year course for its naval cadets and by 1961 had adopted its present 4-year curriculum of study of its cadets.

It acquired its present name Akademy Angkatan Laut in 1956 (the name was restored in 1984).

=== Recent developments ===
Starting in 2011, graduates of the academy were awarded a bachelor's degree (in applied defence sciences, Indonesian: Sarjana Sains Terapan Pertahanan) along with other academies in AKABRI. In 2017, the academy had its first female graduates in history.

== Current curriculum ==
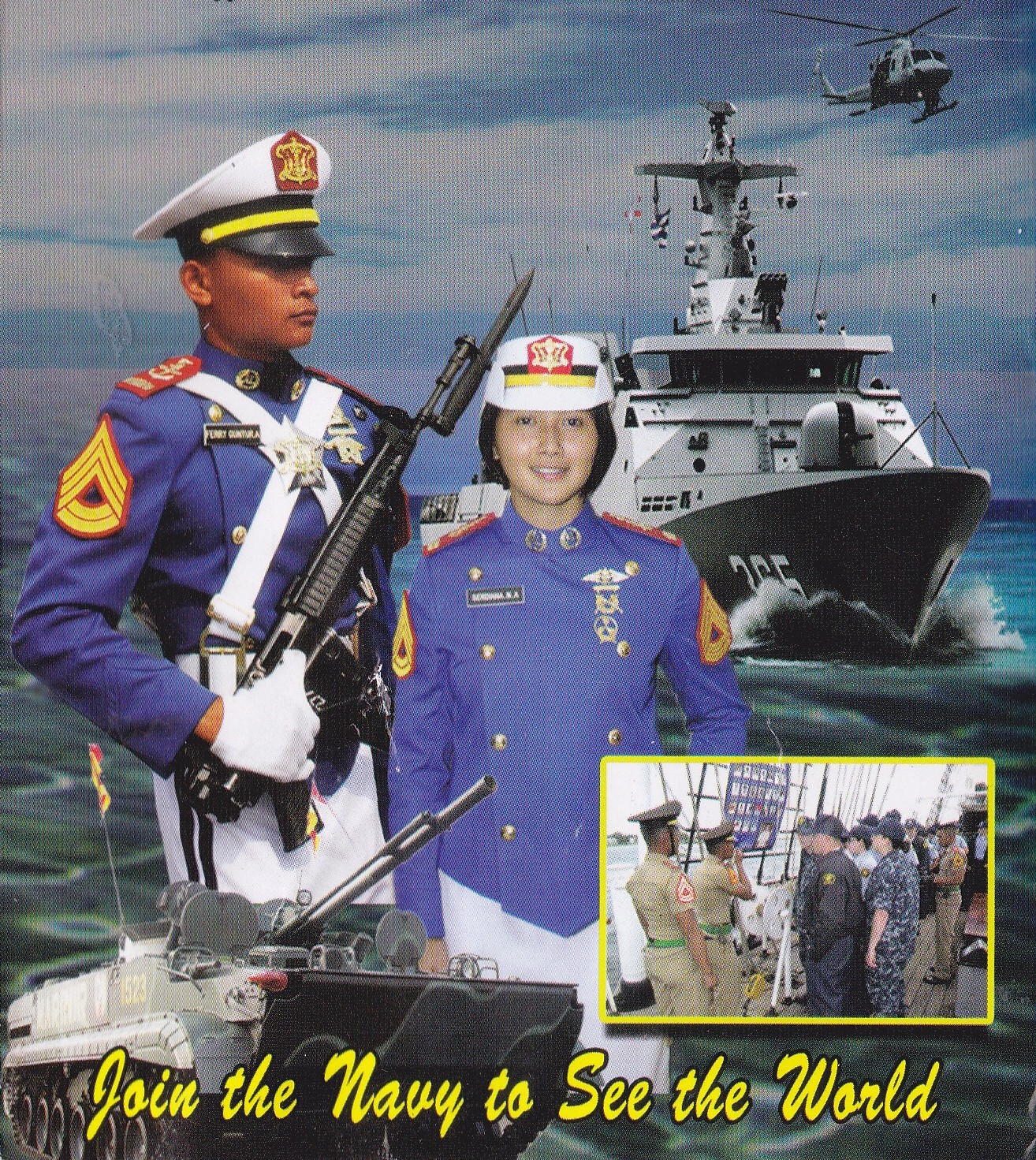
An Indonesian Naval Academy recruiting poster

The Naval Academy, similar to most naval academies in the world, is a medium-sized, highly residential baccalaureate college, with a full-time, three-year undergraduate program that emphasizes instruction in the arts, sciences, and professions with no graduate program, preparing men and women to take on the challenge of being officers of the Indonesian Navy. The academy is accredited by the Ministry of Research, Technology and Higher Education. Cadets who passed the initial selection process will first attend a 1-year basic program in Indonesian Military Academy with students from the Military, Air Force, and Police academies in Magelang, prior to 2 more years of specialized study in the Surabaya campus before being commissioned as officers of the Navy.

=== Undergraduate program – academic ===
The academic program consists of a structured core of subjects depending on the cadet's chosen specialty as a future Navy officer, balanced between the arts and sciences, in his/her chosen specialty branch. Regardless of major, all cadets graduate with a Bachelor of Applied Defense Science degree.

=== Undergraduate program – military ===
As all cadets are commissioned as second lieutenants upon graduation, naval and leadership education is nested with academic instruction. Military training and discipline fall under the purview of the Office of the Commandant of Cadets. Entering freshmen, or 3rd class cadets, are referred to as New Cadets, and enter the academy on Reception Day (in September) to start their military service training as future officers and are recognized as full cadets in a ceremony in January the following year alongside cadets from the other service branches and the National Police, where they receive ceremonial daggers. Additionally the cadets of the academy, which form the student body known as the Regiment of Naval Cadets, have additional open water and pool training to emphasize their readiness for ocean and water survival upon their completion of studies and commissioning as officers, plus sail training on the soon to be decommissioned barquentine KRI Dewaruci (to be replaced by the barque KRI Bima Suci) and the schooner KRI Arung Samudera, which also doubles as goodwill trips to many parts of the world. Additional training is provided by the training corvette KRI Ki Hajar Dewantara, the only one of its kind in Southeast Asia, for officer cadets of the fleet forces, technical and electronics branches, while Marine Corps cadets also receive additional training in the Marine Corps Training Command and with the 2nd Marine Force units in their chosen specialty (Infantry, Cavalry, Artillery and combat support).

Selected cadets are also selected for foreign exchange studies in the military and naval academies of Singapore, Thailand, Australia, the Philippines, the United States, Malaysia, Singapore and Vietnam, and even in the Royal Netherlands Navy Institute, among others.

== Cadet life ==
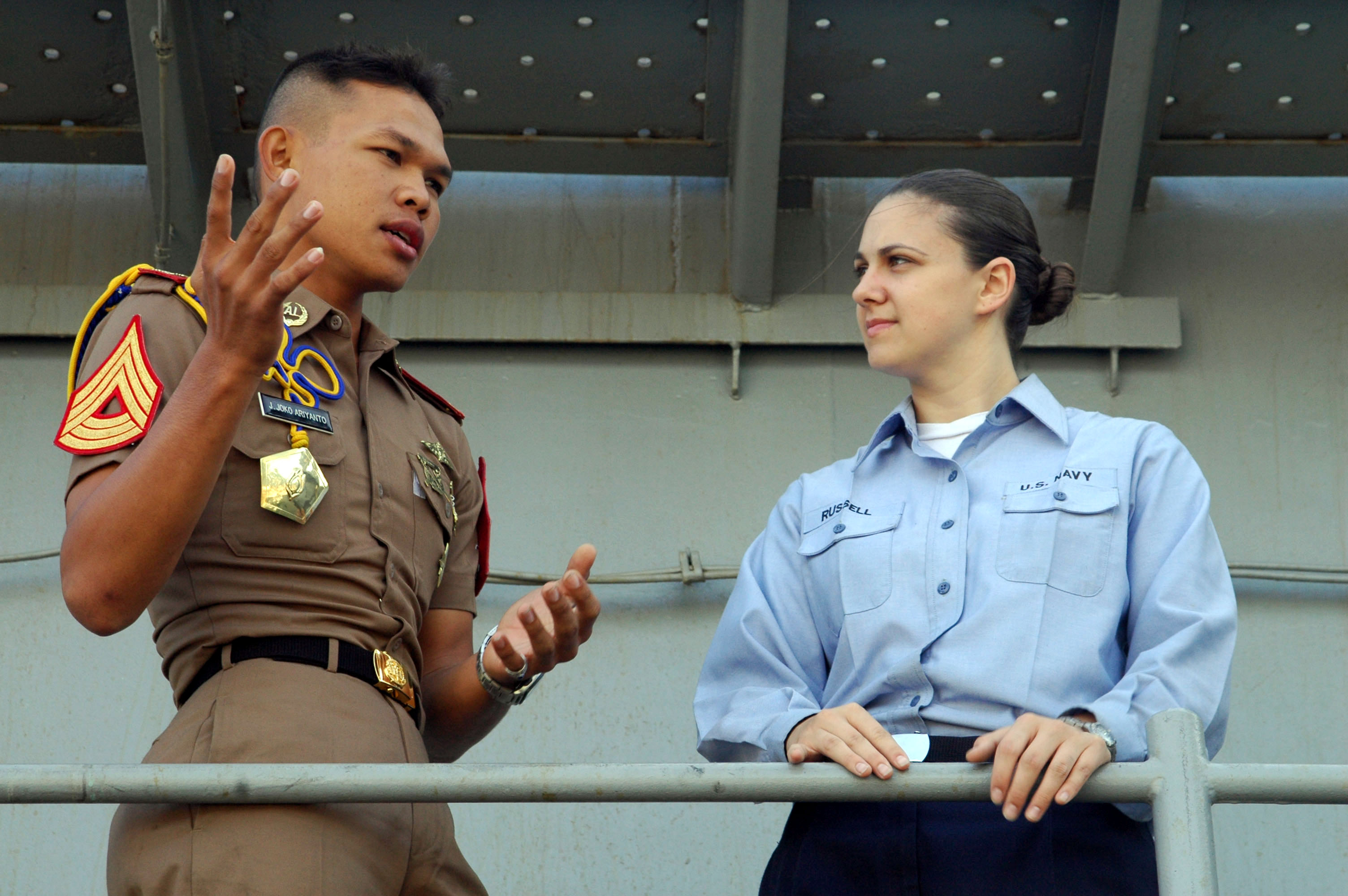
Cadet from the Indonesian Navy speaks with a US Navy Seaman on the USS Kitty Hawk (CV 63)

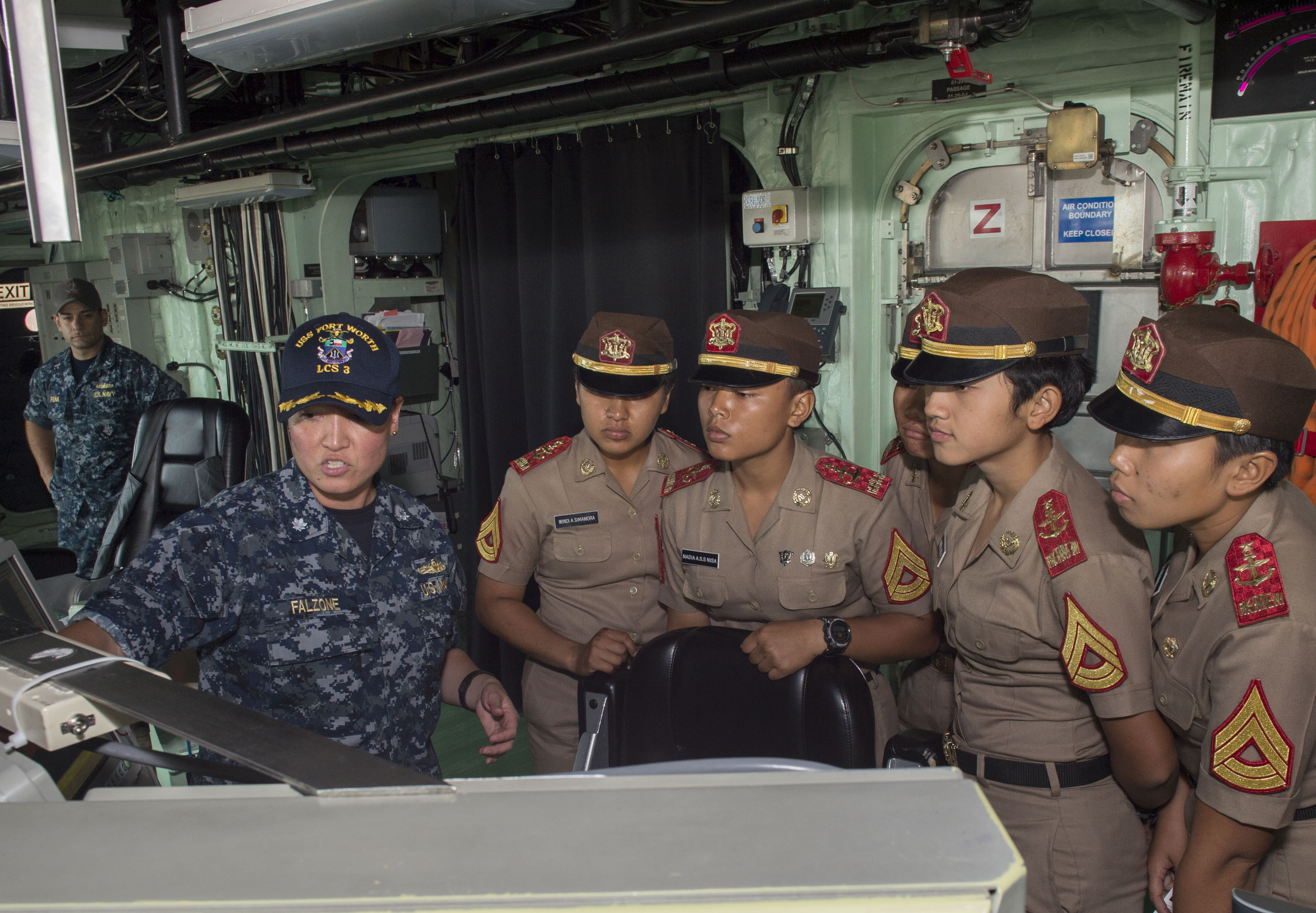
Cadets from the Indonesian Navy tour the USS Fort Worth on CARAT Indonesia 2015

Naval Cadets are classified not as freshmen, juniors, and seniors, but as third class, second class, and first class, respectively, as a whole they are referred as Kadet AAL or Taruna AAL (Cadets of the Naval Academy). The Regiment of Naval Cadets is made up of four battalions, each composed of 3-5 companies of cadets from the 3rd to 1st classes onward (due to the joint service training done by the 4th class cadets), and all are led by Cadet Staff Sergeant Majors.

Naval Cadets wear service dress uniforms similar to those of the other military academies within the INAF, with chevrons varying by school year or officer cadet rank. All wear gold anchor insignia on both lapel collars and scarlet shoulder boards of the service dress blue jacket. Those who are part of the Drum and Bugle Corps wear identical uniforms, but the snare drumline wears the junior ratings' dress uniform with the sailor cap since 2022 - as an alternate - and the bass and tenor drummers and baritone buglers wear combat dress uniforms.

=== Ranks of the Corps ===
- Prajurit Kadet (Cadet Private), 1st year (two months), one chevron, pointed up
- Kopral Kadet (Cadet Corporal), 1st year (4 months), one chevron and one rocker below
- Sersan Kadet (Cadet Sergeant), 1st year (after 6 months), most academy cadets begin their studies in this rank after their joint service training six months after admission, two chevrons and two rockers below
- Sersan Mayor Dua Kadet (Cadet Second Sergeant Major), 2nd year - held by platoon commanders, three chevrons and two rockers below
- Sersan Mayor Satu Kadet (Cadet First Sergeant Major), 3rd year - held by company and battalion commanders, three chevrons and three chevrons below

=== Organization of the Regiment of Naval Cadets ===
- Regimental HQ
  - Commandant
  - Assistant Commandant
  - Chief of Staff
  - Command Sergeant Major
- 1st to 4th Cadet Battalions
- Support Battalion
- Special Troops Battalion
- "Gita Jala Taruna" Regimental Drum and Bugle Corps
- Regimental Band of the Naval Academy Surabaya
- Dependencies

== See also ==
- Indonesian Navy
- Indonesian Military Academy
- Indonesian Air Force Academy
- Indonesian National Armed Forces
