= Batang Gadis National Park =

National park in Indonesia

- IUCN category II (national park)
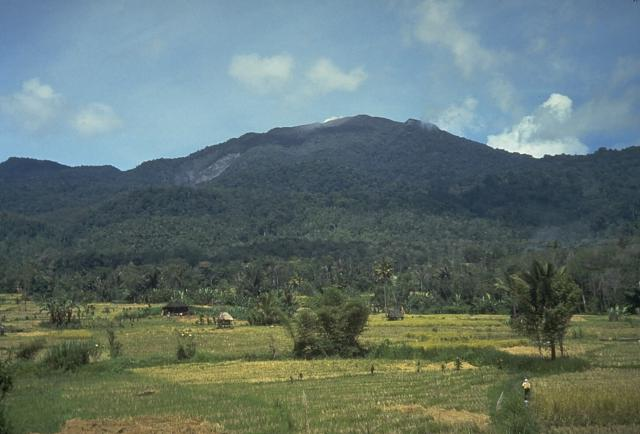
- Sorikmarapi volcano, the highest point in the national park.

- Location within Sumatra Location within Indonesia
- Location: North Sumatra Province, Indonesia
- Nearest city: Panyabungan
- Coordinates: 0°59′N 99°23′E
- Area: 1,080 km^{2} (420 sq mi)
- Established: 2004
- Governing body: Ministry of Forestry

Batang Gadis is a national park covering 1,080 km^{2} in North Sumatra province, Indonesia extending between 300 and 2,145 metres altitude. It is named after the Batang Gadis river that flows through the park. Signs of the endangered Sumatran tiger and the threatened Asian golden cat, leopard cat and clouded leopard were seen in the park. The protection of Batang Gadis as a national park is part of a plan to create the Northern Sumatra biodiversity conservation corridor, which would be connected, via a series of protected areas and forests, to Gunung Leuser National Park in the north of the island.

== Flora and fauna ==
There are at least 47 species of mammals, 247 of birds, 240 vascular plants and 1,500 microorganisms in the park.

By sampling of a 200 square metres area, researchers found 242 vascular plants or about 1 percent of all flora in Indonesia. Heptapleurum aromaticum is often the most common plant to occur in the understory of montane primary forest, where it is found at densities of 7% to 17% in the forest cover. The fern Diplazium proliferum is the second most common plant in this area. At lower elevations in both primary and secondary forest it is also the second most (after Dracontomelon dao), or most, respectively, dominant understory plant, but it occurs at lower densities. On less diverse, more heavily degraded land however, it is even more dominant, occurring at up to 25% of the forest cover. Where the forest is disturbed the only understory species more common than this Heptapleurum in the park is Ganua kingiana.

The mammals that can be found are Sumatran tiger, Malayan tapir, Malayan porcupine, Asian golden cat, leopard cat, Indian muntjac, mainland serow, Java mouse-deer, binturong, sun bear and Sambar deer. There were 13 endemic species of bird recorded in the park, including Salvadori's pheasant and Schneider's pitta. Amphibians include the caecilian Ichtyopis glutinosa and the long-nosed horned frog, etc.

In 2008 the population of Sumatran tigers has been estimated to be between ca. 30 to 100. In 2013 their number has been estimated to be between 23 and 76, or 20% of the total population.

== Conservation and threats ==
Parts of the forest within the national park have been protected by the Dutch colonial government since 1921. The proposal for a national park was submitted by the local government in 2003, and the Batang Gadis National Park was declared in 2004.

The wildlife in the park is threatened by poaching, and encroachment by an Australian gold mining company that holds a 200,000-hectare concession that overlaps with the national park.
