= Abdul Haris Nasution =

Indonesian army general (1918–2000)

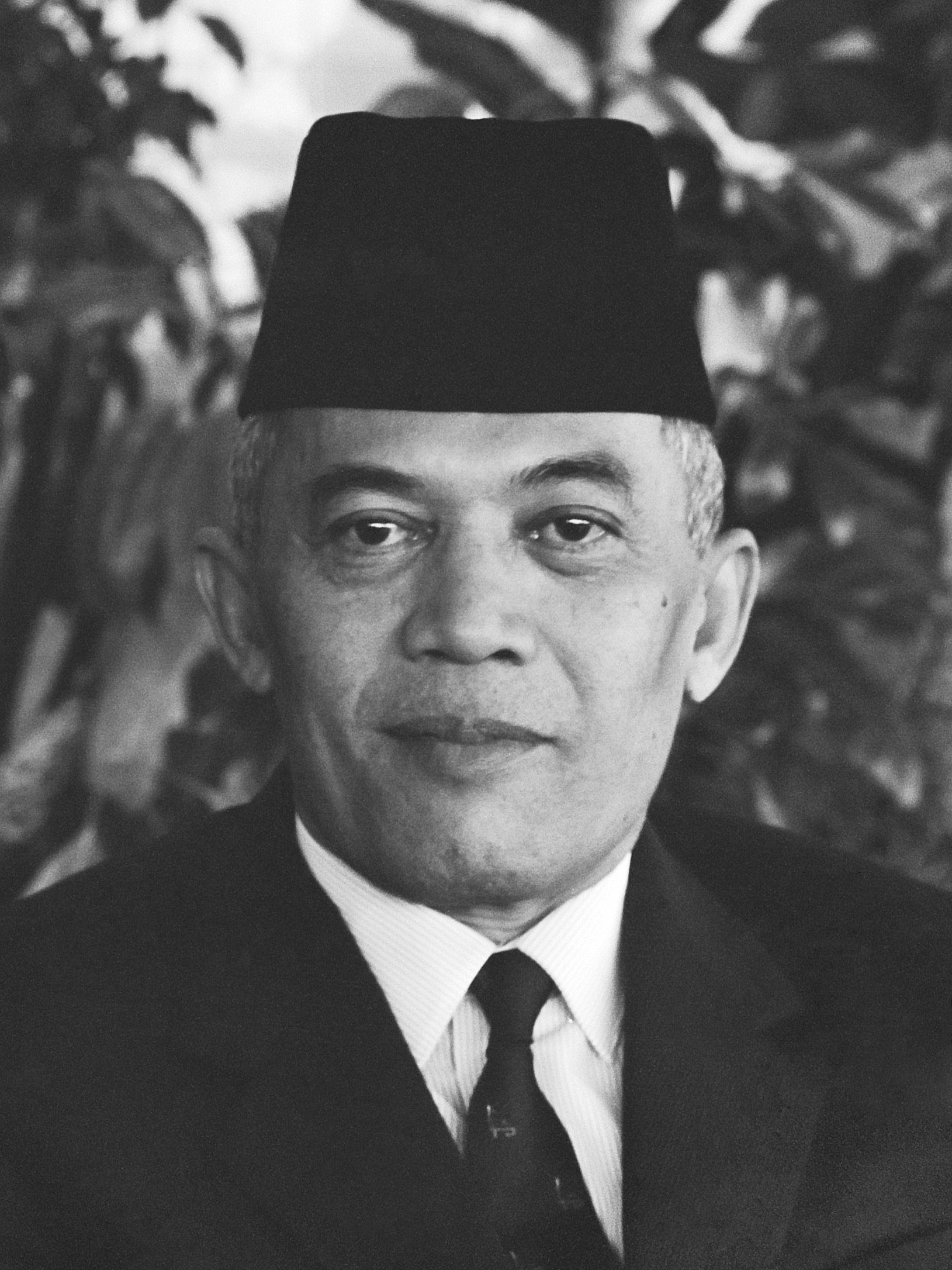
- Nasution in 1971

2nd Speaker of the People's Consultative Assembly
- In office 20 June 1966 – 28 October 1971
- Preceded by: Wiluyo Puspoyudo
- Succeeded by: Idham Chalid

11th Minister of Defense and Security
- In office 10 July 1959 – 22 February 1966
- President: Sukarno
- Preceded by: Djuanda Kartawidjaja
- Succeeded by: Sarbini Martodihardjo

3rd Chief of Staff of the Armed Forces of the Republic of Indonesia
- In office January 1962 – March 1966
- President: Sukarno
- Preceded by: ACM Soerjadi Soerjadarma
- Succeeded by: General Suharto (1968)
- In office December 1955 – July 1959
- President: Sukarno
- Preceded by: Maj. Gen. Tahi Bonar Simatupang (1953)
- Succeeded by: ACM Soerjadi Soerjadarma

2nd and 5th Chief of Staff of the Army
- In office 1 November 1955 – 21 June 1962
- President: Sukarno
- Preceded by: Maj. Gen. Bambang Utoyo
- Succeeded by: Lt. Gen. Ahmad Yani
- In office 27 December 1949 – 18 October 1952
- President: Sukarno
- Preceded by: Colonel Djatikoesoemo
- Succeeded by: Maj. Gen. Bambang Soegeng

Personal details
- Born: 3 December 1918 Kotanopan, Mandailing, Dutch East Indies
- Died: 6 September 2000 (aged 81) Jakarta, Indonesia
- Resting place: Kalibata Heroes' Cemetery
- Party: Independent
- Other political affiliations: IPKI (formerly)
- Spouse: Johanna Sunarti (m. 1947)
- Children: 2 daughters
- Occupation: Army officer; politician
- Nicknames: Pak Nas; Nurdin (Note: Code name used by the Tjakrabirawa Regiment during the September 30th Movement)

Military service
- Allegiance: Dutch East Indies; Indonesia
- Branch/service: Royal Dutch East Indies Army; Indonesian Army
- Years of service: 1941–1952; 1955–1971
- Rank: Grand general
- Unit: Infantry
- Commands: See list: Siliwangi Division; Indonesian Army; Indonesian Armed Forces
- Battles/wars: See list: World War II; Dutch East Indies campaign; Battle of Java; Indonesian National Revolution; Madiun Affair; Operation Kraai; March offensive; 17 October affair; Darul Islam rebellion; Invasion of Ambon; PRRI rebellion; Permesta rebellion; West New Guinea dispute; Operation Trikora; Operation Dwikora; 30 September Movement; Operation Trisula
- Awards: National Hero (2002); List of awards
- Service no.: 13619

Abdul Haris Nasution (Old Spelling: Abdoel Haris Nasution; 3 December 1918 – 6 September 2000) was a high-ranking Indonesian general and politician. He served in the military during the Indonesian National Revolution and remained in the military during the subsequent turmoil of the Parliamentary democracy and Guided Democracy. Following the fall of President Sukarno from power, he became the Speaker of the People's Consultative Assembly under President Suharto. Born into a Batak Muslim family, in the village of Hutapungkut, Dutch East Indies, he studied teaching and enrolled at a military academy in Bandung.

He became a member of the Royal Netherlands East Indies Army, but following the Japanese invasion, he joined the Defenders of the Homeland. Following the proclamation of independence, he enlisted in the fledgling Indonesian armed forces and fought during the Indonesian National Revolution. In 1946, he was appointed commander of the Siliwangi Division, the guerrilla unit operating in West Java. After the end of the national revolution, he was appointed Chief of Staff of the army, until he was suspended for his involvement in the 17 October affair. He was reappointed to the position in 1955.

On the 1st October 1965, an attempted coup occurred, later officially blamed on the Communist Party of Indonesia. Nasution's house was attacked, and his daughter was killed, but he managed to escape by scaling a wall and hiding in the Iraqi ambassador's residence. In the following political turmoil, he assisted in the rise of President Suharto and was appointed Speaker of the People's Consultative Assembly. He had a falling-out with Suharto, who saw him as a rival, and he was pushed out of power in 1971. Once he was removed from positions of power, Nasution developed into a political opponent of Suharto's New Order Regime, though he and Suharto began to reconcile in the 1990s. He died on 6 September 2000 in Jakarta, after suffering a stroke and going into a coma. His body was interred at Kalibata Heroes' Cemetery.

== Early life ==
Nasution was born on 3 December 1918 in the village of Hutapungkut, Mandailing Natal Regency, North Sumatra, into a Muslim Mandailing Batak family. He was the second child of his parents and the oldest son. His father was a trader who sold textiles, rubber, and coffee and was a member of the Sarekat Islam organisation. His very religious father wanted his son to study at a religious school, while his mother wanted him to study medicine in Batavia. However, after graduating from school in 1932, Nasution received a scholarship to study teaching at Bukitinggi. In 1935 Nasution moved to Bandung to continue his studies, where he remained for three years. His desire to be a teacher gradually faded as his interest in politics grew. He secretly bought books written by the Indonesian nationalist Sukarno and read them with his friends. Following his graduation in 1937, Nasution returned to Sumatra and taught in Bengkulu, living near the house where Sukarno lived in exile. He occasionally spoke with Sukarno and heard him give speeches. A year later Nasution moved to Tanjungraja, near Palembang, where he continued to teach, but became more and more interested in politics and the military.

In 1940, Nazi Germany occupied the Netherlands and the Dutch colonial authorities established an officer reserve corps that admitted pribumi (native Indonesians). Nasution applied to join, as this was the only way to obtain military training. Along with a few other Indonesians, he was sent to the Bandung Military Academy for training. In September 1940 he was promoted to corporal, then three months later to sergeant. He subsequently became an officer in the Royal Netherlands East Indies Army (KNIL). In 1942 the Japanese invaded and occupied Indonesia. At the time, Nasution was in Surabaya, having been posted there to defend the port. Nasution then found his way back to Bandung and went into hiding, as he was afraid of being arrested by the Japanese. However, he later assisted the Japanese-backed PETA militias by carrying messages but did not become a member.

== Indonesian National Revolution ==
=== Siliwangi Division ===
After Sukarno declared Indonesia's independence on 17 August 1945, Nasution joined the fledgling Indonesian Army, then known as the People's Security Army (TKR), which was fighting the Indonesian National Revolution against the Dutch. In May 1946, he was appointed Regional Commander of the Siliwangi Division, which looked after the security of West Java. In this position, Nasution developed the theory of territorial warfare which would become the future defense doctrine of the Indonesian Army. In January 1948, the Indonesian Government and the Dutch Government signed the Renville Agreement, dividing Java between areas under Dutch and Indonesian control. Because the territories occupied by the Dutch included West Java, Nasution was forced to lead the Siliwangi Division across to Central Java and into Indonesian-controlled territory.

=== Deputy commander ===
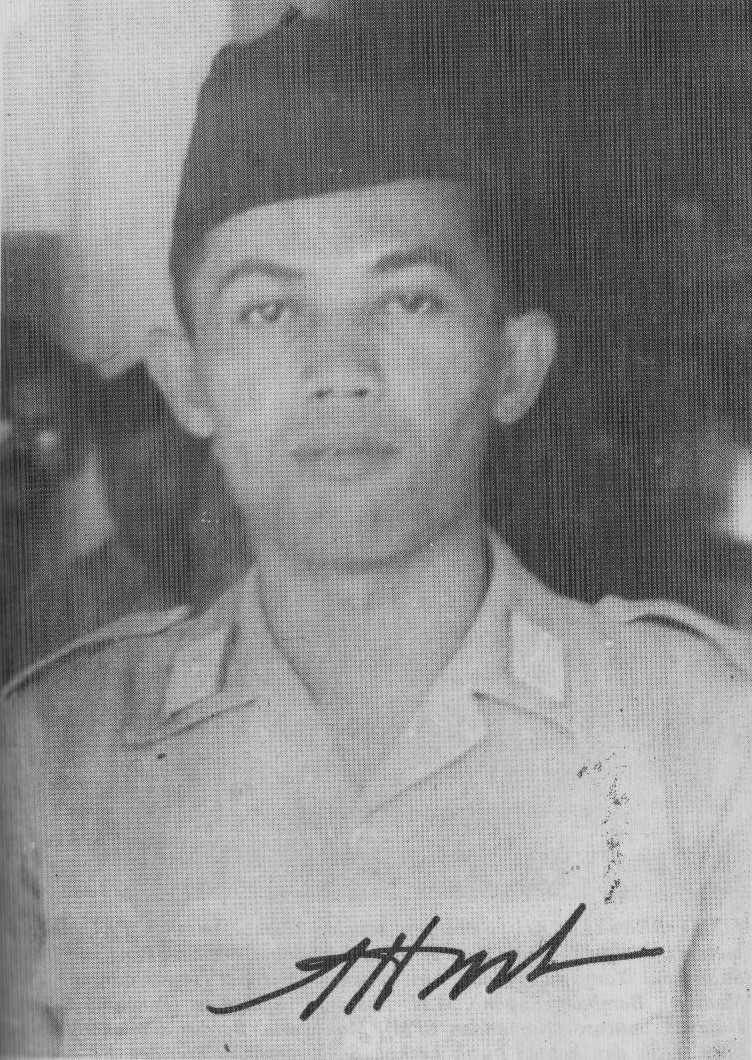
Nasution as the Deputy Commander of the Indonesian National Armed Forces

1948 would also see Nasution rise to the position of Deputy TNI Commander. Despite being only a Colonel, this appointment made Nasution the most powerful person in the TNI, second only to the popular General Sudirman. Nasution immediately went to work in his new role. In April, he assisted Sudirman in reorganising the structure of the troops. In June, at a commanders' meeting, his suggestion that TNI should fight guerrilla warfare against the Dutch was approved. Although not the Commander of the TNI, Nasution gained experience in the role of Armed Forces Commander in September 1948 with the Madiun incident. Following the takeover of the city of Madiun in East Java, by former Prime Minister Amir Syarifuddin and Musso of the Indonesian Communist Party (PKI). When the news reached the TNI Headquarters in Yogyakarta, a meeting was held between senior military officers.

Sudirman was anxious to avoid violence and wanted negotiations to be conducted. Sudirman then commissioned Lieutenant Colonel Suharto, to negotiate a deal with the communists. After taking his trip, Suharto returned to Nasution and Sudirman and reported that everything seemed to be peaceful. Nasution did not trust this report and with Sudirman down with an illness, Nasution was left in charge. Nasution then decided on a crackdown, sending troops to go after the communists to put down and end the rebellion. On 30 September Madiun was taken over by republican troops of the Siliwangi Division. Thousands of communist party members were killed and 36,000 were imprisoned. Amongst the executed were several leaders including Musso, who was killed on 31 October, allegedly while trying to escape from prison. Other PKI leaders such as D.N. Aidit went into exile in China.

On 19 December 1948, the Dutch launched a successful attack on Yogyakarta and occupied it. Nasution, together with the TNI and the other commanders, retreated into the countryside to fight a guerrilla war. With President Sukarno and Vice-president Mohammad Hatta in Dutch captivity, the Emergency Government of the Republic of Indonesia (PDRI) was set up in Sumatra. In this interim government, Nasution was given the position of the Army and Territorial Commander of Java. Following Dutch recognition of Indonesia's independence, the PDRI returned its powers to Sukarno and Hatta, and Nasution returned to his position as Deputy Commander to Sudirman.

== Parliamentary democracy era ==
=== First term as chief of staff ===
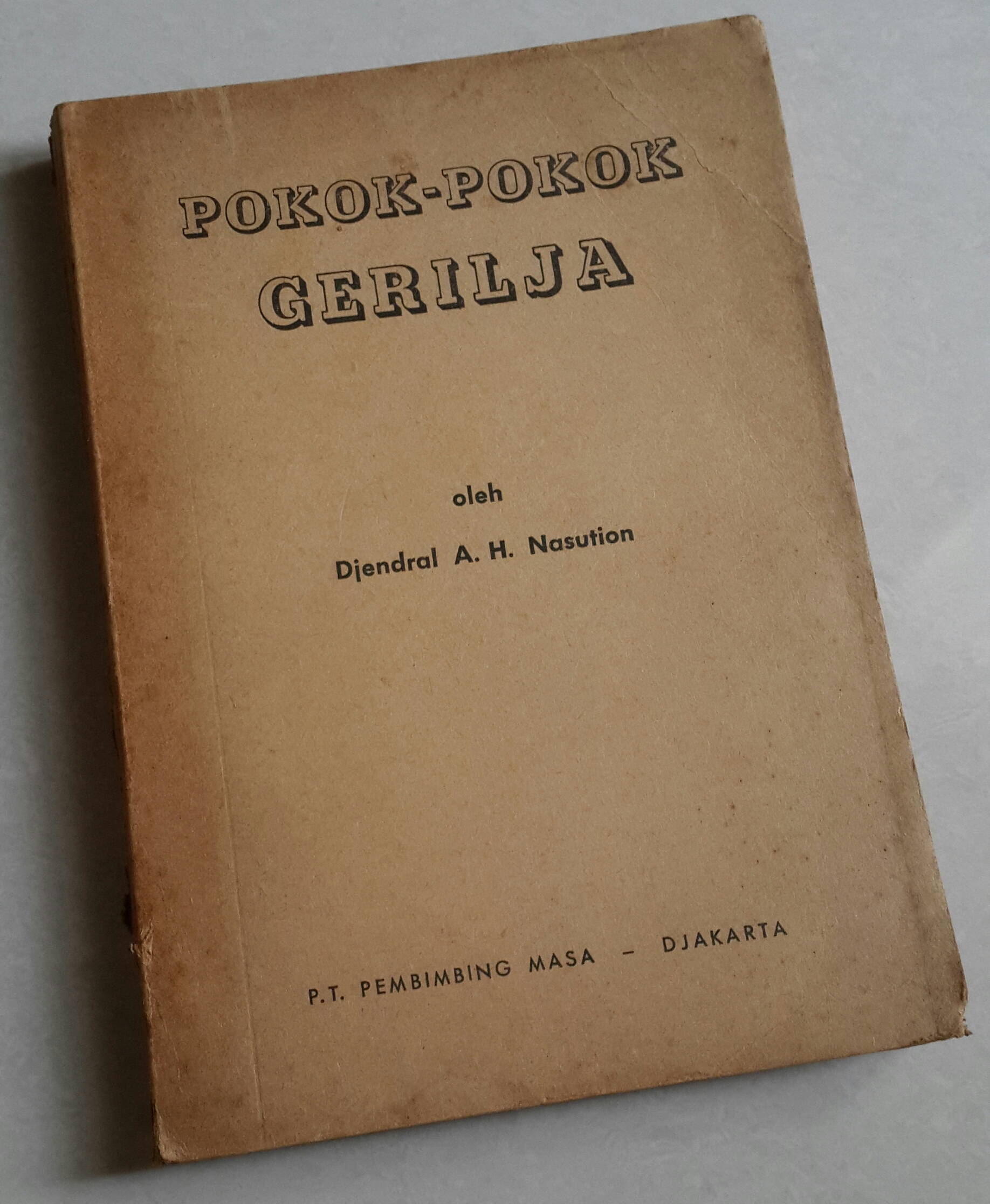
Fundamentals of Guerrilla Warfare by Nasution

In December 1949, Nasution took on his position as army chief of staff, with T. B. Simatupang replacing Sudirman as the commander of the newly dubbed TNI (Armed Forces of the Republic of Indonesia). In 1952, Nasution and Simatupang decided to adopt a policy of restructuring and reorganisation for TNI. Under this arrangement, Nasution and Simatupang hoped to create a smaller army but one that was more modern and professional. It did not take long, however, before factional interests came into play. Nasution and Simatupang, who had both been trained by the Dutch colonial government wanted to discharge the soldiers trained by the Japanese and integrate more soldiers trained by the Dutch. The Japanese-trained troops, led by Bambang Supeno, began speaking out against this policy. In adopting their policy, Nasution and Simatupang had the backing of Prime Minister Wilopo and Defense Minister Hamengkubuwono IX. However, Supeno managed to find support from among the opposition parties in the People's Representative Council (DPR). The DPR members then began making their disagreements on the restructuring of TNI known. Nasution and Simatupang were not happy to see what they perceived to be interference in military affairs by civilians. On 17 October 1952, Nasution and Simatupang mobilised their troops in a show of force. Protesting against civilian interference in military affairs, Nasution and Simatupang had their troops surround the Presidential Palace and point their tank turrets at it. Their demand to Sukarno was that the current DPR be dismissed.

For this cause, Nasution and Simatupang also mobilised civilian protesters. Sukarno came out of the Presidential Palace and convinced both soldiers and civilians to go home. Nasution and Simatupang had been defeated. Nasution and Simatupang were then questioned by Attorney General Suprapto. In December 1952, they both lost their positions in ABRI and were suspended from the service.

=== Second term as chief of staff ===
On 27 October 1955, after three years of exile, Nasution was re-appointed to his old position as Army Chief of Staff. He immediately began working on the army and its structure by adopting a threefold approach. First, he formulated a tour of duty system so that officers would be stationed around the country and gain experience. This would also result in army officers being more professional, instead of feeling personal attachment and loyalty to the province and region they came from. Nasution's second change was to centralise military training. All training methods would now be uniform, instead of regional commanders setting up their methods. Nasution's third and most important reform was to increase the army's influence and power so that it would be able to take care of itself, instead of relying on civilian decisions. Nasution did not have a problem applying the first two changes, but he would have to wait to apply the third. By 1957, President Sukarno had begun to introduce the concept of Guided Democracy, in response to his disenchantment with the Parliamentary Democracy approach which Indonesia had adopted since November 1945. In this, he found a common bond with Nasution and the army, who still harboured resentment of civilian interference with army affairs in 1952.

On 14 March 1957, after the resignation of Prime Minister Ali Sastroamidjojo and his Cabinet, Sukarno declared a State of Emergency. This move not only ended Sukarno's merely ceremonial presidential role but also increased the army's influence and power as Nasution had wished for. Under this arrangement, regional commanders were able to interfere in civilian matters such as the economy and administrative matters. At the behest of Sukarno himself, the army also began participating in politics, filling in positions that ranged from cabinet ministers to provincial governors and even DPR members. In December 1957, Nasution further increased the army's role by ordering officers to take over the recently nationalised Dutch companies. Aside from increasing the army's role, this move was also designed to stop the influence of the increasingly powerful PKI. In 1958, Nasution made a speech that would become the basis for the Dwifungsi Doctrine which the Suharto regime would adopt. Speaking at Magelang in Central Java, Nasution declared that ABRI should adopt a "middle way in its approach to the nation. According to Nasution, ABRI should not be under the control of civilians. At the same time, ABRI should not dominate the nation in such a way that it became a military dictatorship.

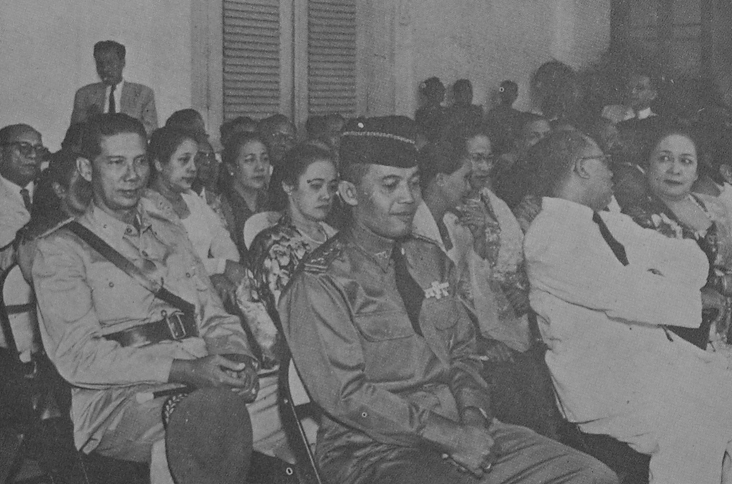
Nasution listening to Sukarno reading his decree of 1959

In late 1956, there were demands by regional commanders in Sumatra for more autonomy in the provinces. When these demands were not met by the central government, the troops began to rebel, and by early 1957, had forcefully taken over the governance of Sumatra. Then, on 15 February 1958, Lieutenant Colonel Ahmad Husein declared the establishment of the Revolutionary Government of the Republic of Indonesia (PRRI). This prompted the central government to deploy troops. As army chief of staff, Nasution would normally have been involved in mobilising the troops to Sumatra. However, it would be his second deputy, Colonel Ahmad Yani who would make his name by successfully putting down the rebellions. On 5 July 1959, Sukarno issued a decree declaring that Indonesia would now revert to the original 1945 Constitution. Parliamentary democracy system would be ended and Sukarno was now the Head of Government in addition to being the Head of State. Nasution was appointed minister of defense and security in Sukarno's Cabinet while continuing to hold the position as army chief of staff.

== Guided Democracy era ==
=== Corruption in the army ===
Since 1956, Nasution had been trying to stamp out corruption in the army, but the return to the 1945 Constitution seemed to have renewed his resolve in this matter. He believed that the army should set an example for the rest of society. Not long after Sukarno's decree, Nasution sent Brigadier General Sungkono to investigate the financial dealings of Military Area Command IV/Diponegoro (Kodam) and its commander, Colonel Suharto. Sungkono's findings revealed that during his time as regional commander, Suharto had set up foundations to help local people. However, these foundations were funded through compulsory levies (instead of voluntary donations) on production and service industries.

Suharto was also involved in illegally bartering sugar for rice with Thailand. Nasution wanted to take action against Suharto and considered expelling him from the army. However, Deputy Army Chief of Staff Gatot Soebroto intervened. Gatot had taken Suharto under his wing when he was Commander of Kodam IV/Diponegoro and had noticed Suharto's talents. Gatot asked Nasution not to expel Suharto because Suharto's talent could be further developed. Nasution listened to Gatot's advice. He decided to remove Suharto from his position and to punish him by sending him to the Army Staff College (Seskoad).

=== West Irian ===
During the struggle for independence, Sukarno had always perceived Indonesia as also including West Papua. When the Dutch finally recognised Indonesia's independence, West Papua continued to be a Dutch colony. Sukarno did not give up and continued to push for it to be included as part of Indonesia through the United Nations and through the Bandung Conference, where the attending nations promised to support Indonesia's claim. The Dutch remained adamant and by 1960, Sukarno had run out of patience. In July, he met with his top advisors, including Nasution, and it was agreed that Indonesia would pursue a policy of confrontation against the Dutch on the matter of West Papua. As part of the preparation for this campaign, Nasution turned to Suharto, who had finished his Seskoad course in November 1960.

Suharto, now a brigadier general, was commissioned by Nasution to create a strategic force unit that would be on standby, ready to be called into action at any time. Suharto was placed in charge of this task force and in March 1961, the General Army Reserve (Caduad) was formed, with Suharto being appointed as its commander. Caduad would in 1963 change its name to the Army Strategic Reserve Command (Kostrad). At the beginning of 1962, Nasution and Yani were the overall commanders of the so-called Liberation of West Irian, with Suharto stationed in east Indonesia as the field commander.

=== Rivalry with the Communists ===
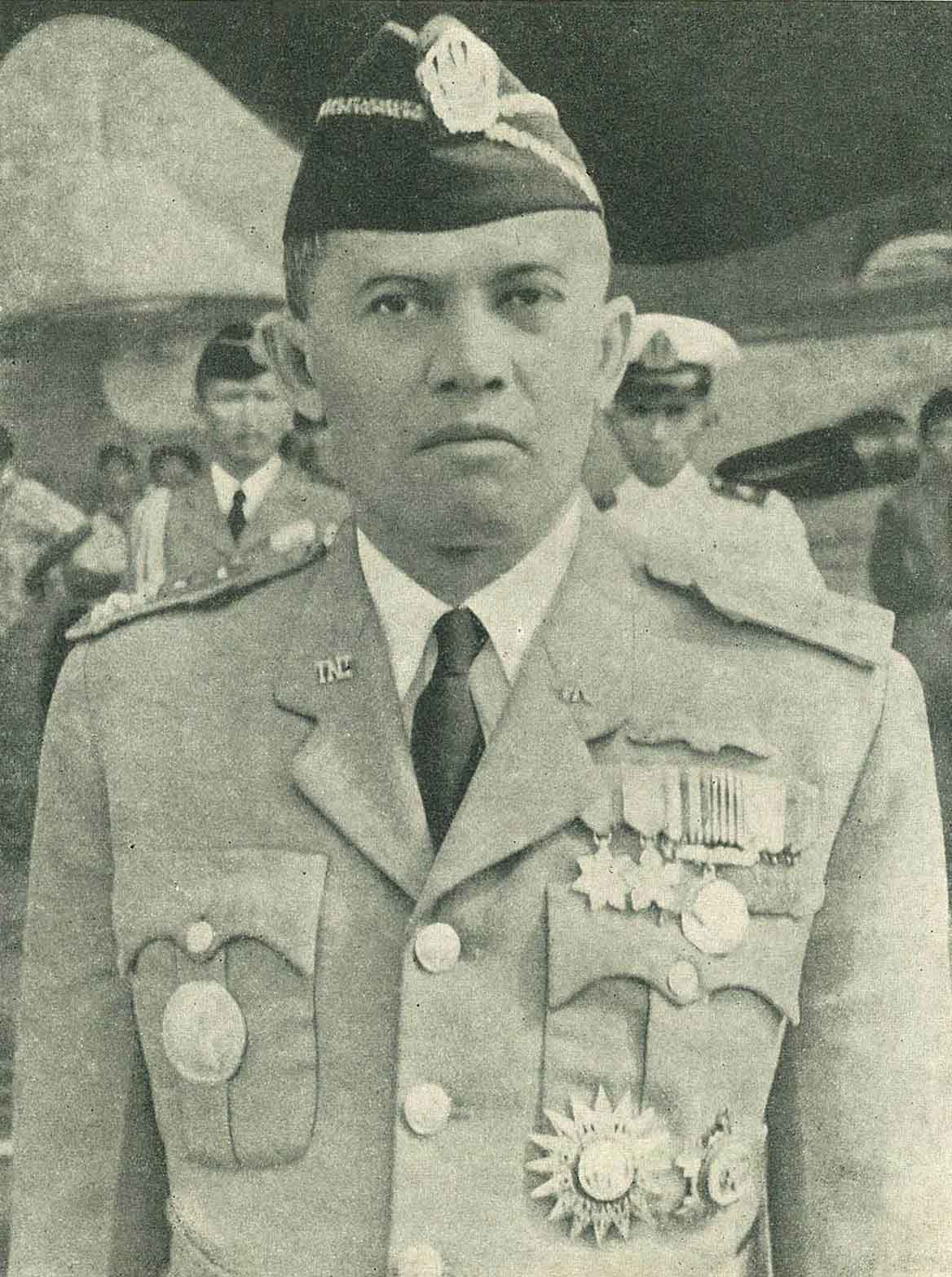
Nasution in uniform, c. 1960

Around this time, Sukarno had begun to see the Communist Party of Indonesia (PKI) instead of the army as his main political ally. Although he had set Indonesia on a non-aligned course during the Cold War, the revelation that the PRRI was assisted by the United States, caused Sukarno to adopt an anti-American stance. In this, he had the PKI as a natural ally. For the PKI, an alliance with Sukarno would only add to its political momentum as its influence continued to grow in Indonesian politics. Nasution was wary of the PKI's influence over Sukarno and in turn, Sukarno was aware that Nasution was not happy about the PKI's influence and made a move to weaken his power. In July 1962, Sukarno reorganised the structure of ABRI. The status of the heads of the Armed Forces branches would now be upgraded from chief of staff to commander. As commanders, the heads of the armed forces branches would have more power and would answer only to Sukarno as the Supreme Commander of ABRI.

Assisting Sukarno as supreme commander of ABRI would be an ABRI chief of staff. Sukarno appointed Nasution to the position of ABRI chief of staff and appointed Yani as the army commander. By doing this, Sukarno had decreased Nasution's powers as the ABRI chief of staff was only responsible for administrative matters and commenced no troops. Now in a powerless position, Nasution began to think of other ways to stop the PKI's momentum. The right moment came at the Provisional People's Consultative Assembly (MPRS) General Session in May 1963. During the General Session, Nasution had the Indonesian National Party (PNI) as well as the Army members present put forward the motion that Sukarno be appointed president for life. The rationale behind this was that with Sukarno being appointed president for life, there would be no elections, and without elections, the PKI would not be able to get in power no matter how much the party grew. The motion was carried through and Sukarno became president for life.

=== Division with Yani ===
Nasution soon began developing an attitude of hostility towards Yani. Both Nasution and Yani were anti-communists, but their attitude towards Sukarno was different. Nasution was critical of Sukarno for backing and supporting the PKI, while Yani, a Sukarno loyalist, adopted a softer stance. Nasution criticised Yani's soft stance and relations between the two soured. To make matters worse, Yani began replacing regional commanders who were close to Nasution with those who were close to himself. On 13 January 1965, a delegation of officers representing Nasution and Yani met in an attempt to reconcile the differences between the two officers.

The meeting was unsuccessful in persuading Yani to distance himself from Sukarno, but delegates agreed to hold seminars where officers could talk about the current political climate and the role of the army in politics. As the year went on, a document was circulated in Jakarta. Dubbed the Gilchrist Document, it was a letter purporting to come from British ambassador Andrew Gilchrist, and mentioned "our local army friends". Suspicion was immediately cast on the army wanting to launch a coup. Although Yani was quick to deny the allegations, the PKI began running a smear campaign, claiming that a Council of Generals was planning to overthrow the president. As the most senior officers in the Army, Nasution and Yani were implicated to be part of this council.

== G30S and Transition to New Order ==
=== Kidnapping attempt ===
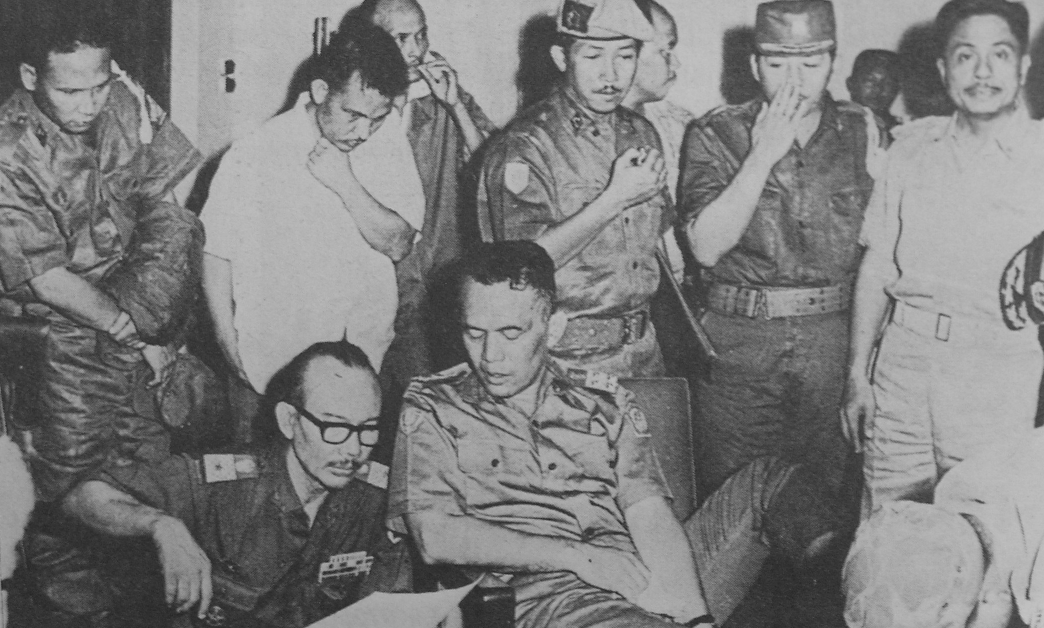
Nasution having his foot treated while discussing the situation at Kostrad HQ on the night of the 1st of October 1965

On the morning of 1 October 1965, troops calling themselves the 30 September Movement (G30S) attempted to kidnap seven anti-communist Army officers including Nasution. Lieutenant Arief was the leader of the squad assigned to capture Nasution, and his team in four trucks and two military cars travelled down the Jalan Teuku Umar (Teuku Umar Street) at 4:00 am. Nasution's home was at No. 40, a modest single-story home. The guard in the sentry box outside the house saw the vehicles coming, but upon seeing the men were soldiers he was not suspicious and did not call his superior, Sergeant Iskaq, who was in charge of the army detail guarding the house. The sergeant was in a guardroom in the front room along with half a dozen soldiers some of whom were asleep. A guard was asleep in the front garden and another was on duty at the rear of the house. In a separate cottage, two of Nasution's aides were asleep, a young army lieutenant Pierre Tendean, and assistant police commissioner Hamdan Mansjur.

Before the alarm could be raised, Arief's squad had jumped the fence and overpowered the sleepy guards in the sentry box and guard room. Others entered from around the side of the house and covered it from the rear. About fifteen soldiers broke into the house. Both Nasution and his wife were bothered by mosquitoes and were awake. Neither heard the guards being overpowered but Mrs Nasution heard a door being forced. She got out of bed to check and on opening the bedroom door, she saw a Cakrabirawa (presidential bodyguard) soldier with a gun ready to shoot. She immediately slammed the door shut and shouted a warning to her husband. Nasution wanted to see himself and when he opened the door, the soldier shot at him. He threw himself to the floor and his wife shut the door and locked it. The men on the other side began to break down the door and fired a volley of shots into the bedroom. Mrs. Nasution pushed her husband out down a corridor to a side entrance to the house. He dashed across his garden to the wall separating his garden and that of neighbouring Iraqi ambassador, but he was spotted by soldiers who fired a volley of shots, which all missed. Nasution broke his ankle as he fell into the ambassador's garden to hide. He was not pursued.

The entire Nasution household was awakened and frightened by the shooting. Nasution's mother and sister, Mardiah, also lived in the house and ran to his bedroom. Mardiah grabbed Nasution's five-year-old daughter, Irma, from her bed, cradling the child protectively in her arms, and tried to run to safety. As she ran past, a corporal from the palace guard fired a round of shots at her through a door. Mardiah was hit in the hand and Irma received three bullets in her spine. She died five days later in hospital. Nasution's eldest daughter, 13-year-old Janti, and her nurse Alfiah had run to the cottage housing Nasution's aides and hid under a bed.

Tendean loaded his weapon and ran from the house, but was caught within a few steps. In the darkness, he was mistaken for Nasution and taken away at gunpoint. After pushing her husband out of the house, Mrs Nasution ran inside and picked up her wounded daughter. As she phoned for a doctor, Cakrabirawa troops demanded she tell them her husband's whereabouts. Reportedly she had a brief and angry exchange with Arief telling him that Nasution had been out of town for a few days. A whistle blew outside and the men in the house left taking Tendean with them. The whole affair had taken nine minutes. Mrs Nasution took her wounded daughter to the Central military hospital and guards sounded the alarm. The Jakarta garrison commander, Major General Umar Wirahadikusumah, rushed to the Nasution home.

A guard outside the house of Johannes Leimena, a neighbour of Nasution's and one of Indonesia's three deputy premiers, heard the commotion and walked down to the Nasution house. In the confusion, the guard was shot and killed. This led to stories of Lemeina being on the plotter's list and of an attack on Lemeina's house. However, the killing of the guard was unplanned.

Nasution continued hiding in the garden of his neighbour until 6 am when he returned to his house with a broken ankle. Nasution then asked his adjutants to take him to the Ministry of Defense and Security because he thought it would be safer there. He was driven there crouching on the floor of a car. Nasution then sent a message to Suharto at Kostrad headquarters, telling him that he was alive and safe. After knowing that Suharto was taking command of the army, Nasution then ordered him to take measures such as finding the whereabouts of the president, contacting navy commander RE Martadinata, marine corps commander Hartono as well as the chief of police Sucipto Judodiharjo, and securing Jakarta by closing off all roads leading up to it. The air force was excluded because its Commander Omar Dhani was suspected of being a G30S sympathiser. Suharto immediately integrated these orders into his plan to secure the city.

At around 2 pm, after the G30S Movement announced the formation of a Revolutionary Council, Nasution sent another order to Suharto, Martadinata, and Judodiharjo. In the order, Nasution said that he was convinced that Sukarno had been kidnapped and taken to the G30S headquarters in Halim. He therefore ordered ABRI to free the president, restore security to Jakarta, and most importantly, appointed Suharto to head the operations. Just as Suharto began working, however, a message came from Sukarno at Halim. Sukarno had decided to appoint Major General Pranoto Reksosamudro – a Sukarno loyalist – to the position of Army Commander and now wanted Pranoto to come to see him. Suharto did not allow Pranoto to go but he knew that Sukarno would not give up in trying to summon Pranoto. To strengthen his bargaining position, Suharto asked Nasution to come to the Kostrad Headquarters.

Nasution arrived at the Kostrad headquarters at around 6 pm, just as Suharto began deploying Sarwo Edhie Wibowo's troops to secure Jakarta from the G30S Movement. There, Nasution finally received first aid for his broken ankle. Once Jakarta was safely secured, Martadinata came to the Kostrad headquarters with a copy of the Presidential Decree which appointed Pranoto. After seeing the decree, Suharto invited Martadinata and Nasution into a room to discuss the situation.

Nasution asked Martadinata how the president came to appoint Pranoto. Martadinata replied that during the afternoon he, Judodiharjo, and Dhani had attended a meeting with Sukarno at Halim to decide who should become the army commander now that Yani was dead. The meeting had decided that Pranoto should become army commander. Nasution said that Sukarno's appointment could not be accepted as the appointment came when Suharto had begun with the operations. Nasution also added that he would back Suharto's decision to not let Pranoto go to Halim. Nasution and Suharto then invited Pranoto in and convinced him to delay accepting his appointment as army commander until after Suharto finished putting down the attempted coup d'état.

With Sarwo Edhie's troops, Jakarta was quickly secured. Suharto then turned his attention to Halim and began making preparations to attack the air base. To assist him, Nasution ordered the navy and the police to assist Suharto in putting down the G30S Movement. To the Air Force, Nasution issued an order saying that they would not be charged with insubordination if they refused to obey Dhani's orders. By 6 am on 2 October, Halim was overtaken and the G30S Movement was officially put down.

=== Missed opportunity ===
Although Suharto had been in focus on the 1st of October, many of the other Army officers still turned to Nasution for leadership and had expected him to take more decisive control of the situation. However, Nasution was deemed indecisive, and slowly but surely the support began to turn away from him. In the first few weeks after G30S, Nasution was the one who constantly lobbied Sukarno to have Suharto appointed Army Commander. Sukarno, who after 1 October wanted to keep Pranoto, had originally only made Suharto the Commander of Kopkamtib, but with Nasution's constant lobbying, Sukarno was finally persuaded and on 14 October 1965, appointed Suharto as the army commander. A golden opportunity came to Nasution in December 1965 when there was talk of his being appointed as vice president to assist Sukarno in times of uncertainty. Nasution did not capitalise on this and chose to do nothing. Suharto, whose political momentum was growing, took the initiative in early 1966 by issuing a statement saying that there was no need to fill the vacant vice presidency.

On 24 February 1966, Nasution was removed from his position as Minister of Defense and Security in a cabinet reshuffle. The position of ABRI Chief of Staff was also abolished. By this stage, the expectation that Nasution would do something was now gone as army officers and student movements alike rallied behind Suharto. Nevertheless, he continued to be a respected figure as many army officers visited him in the days leading up to the signing of the Supersemar document handing over authority from Sukarno to Suharto. When Suharto was about to go to the Kostrad Headquarters to wait for the delivery of the Supersemar, he called Nasution and asked him for his blessing. Nasution's wife gave the blessing on behalf of Nasution, who was not present. Nasution's political senses seemed to have returned after Suharto received the Supersemar. It was perhaps he who first realised that Supersemar not only gave Suharto emergency powers but also gave him executive control. On 12 March 1966, after Suharto had the PKI banned, Nasution suggested to Suharto that he form an emergency Cabinet. Suharto, still cautious about what he could or could not do with his new powers replied that forming a cabinet was the responsibility of the president. Nasution encouraged Suharto, promising him full support but Suharto did not respond and the conversation ended abruptly.

=== Chairman of the MPRS ===
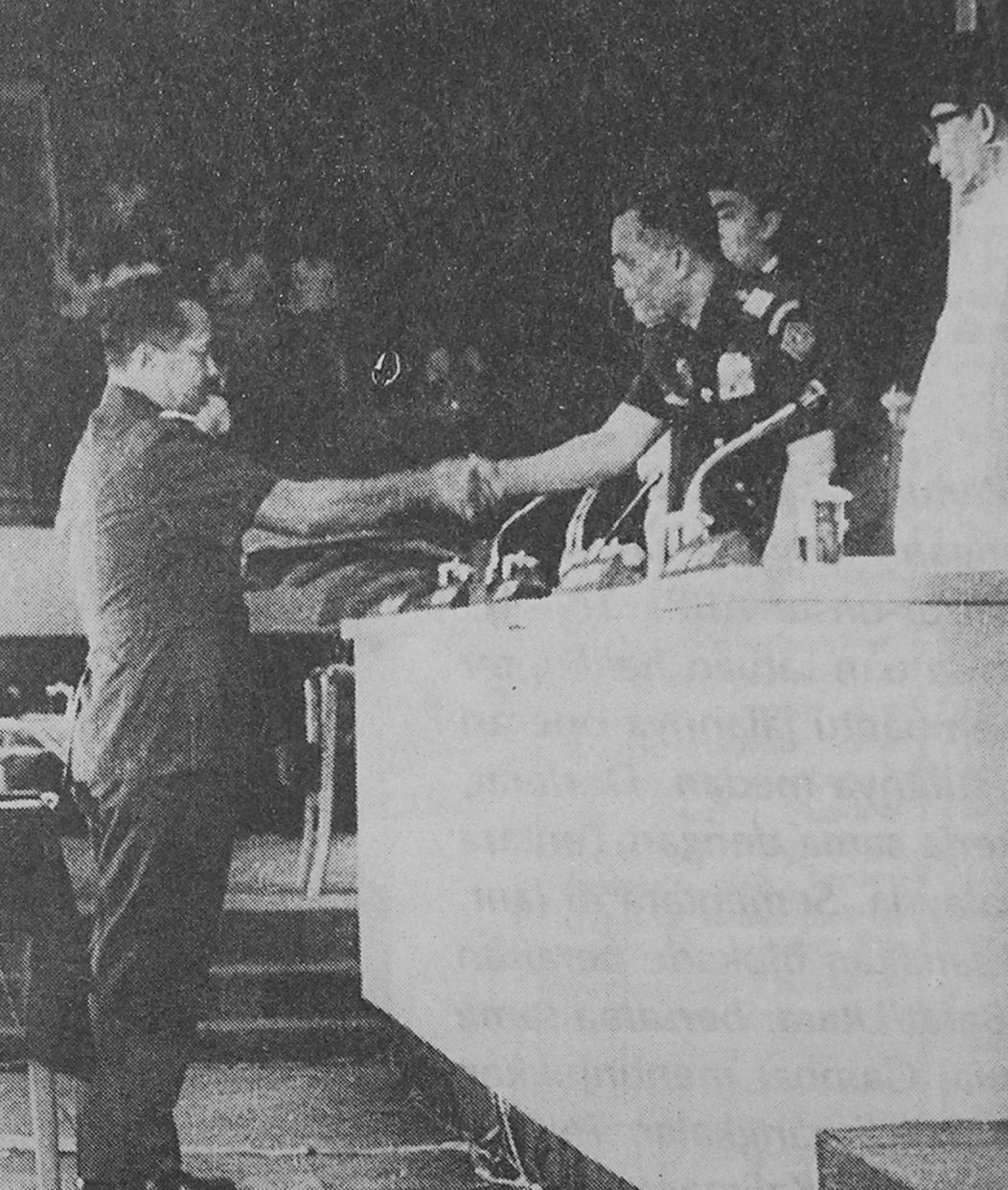
Nasution congratulated General Suharto on his appointment as the acting president, on 12 March 1967.

With his new powers, Suharto began purging the government of what he perceived to be communist influence. After the arrest of 15 cabinet ministers on 18 March 1966, Suharto went after the Provisional People's Consultative Assembly (MPRS), removing members thought to be communist sympathizers and replacing them with members more sympathetic to the army's cause. During the purge, the MPRS also lost its chairman, Chaerul Saleh, and there was a need to fill in the vacant position. Nasution was an overwhelmingly popular choice as all of the factions in the MPRS nominated him for the position of MPRS chairman. However, Nasution waited until Suharto expressed support for his nomination before accepting the nomination. On 20 June 1966, the MPRS General Session began. Nasution set Supersemar (Order of the Eleventh of March) as the first agenda on the list by walking into the assembly hall with the physical document. The next day, on 21 June, the MPRS ratified Supersemar, making it illegal for Sukarno to withdraw it.

On 22 June, Sukarno delivered a speech entitled Nawaksara (Nine Points) in front of the assembly. Nasution and the other MPRS members, who had hoped for Sukarno's account of G30S were disappointed. Nothing about the G30S was mentioned. Instead, Sukarno seemed to give an account of his appointment as president for life, his plan of work as president, and how the Constitution worked in practice. This MPRS would refuse to ratify this speech. Over the next two weeks, Nasution presided over a busy MPRS General Session. Under his Chairmanship, the MPRS took measures such as banning Marxism-Leninism, revoking Sukarno's life presidency, and ordering a legislative election to be held by July 1968. The MPRS General Session also increased Suharto's power by officially ordering him to formulate a new cabinet. A decree was also passed which stated that if the president was unable to carry out his duties, he would now be replaced by the holder of the Supersemar instead of the vice-president.

As 1966 wore on, Sukarno was increasingly on the defensive and his popularity was at an all-time low. Suharto, who knew that his political victory was near, took to playing the role of the polite Javanese by constantly giving Sukarno reassuring words and defending him from the protests. Other generals such as Nasution were not as merciful, as the year drew to a close, Nasution claimed that Sukarno should be held responsible for the dire situation in which his Government left Indonesia. Nasution also called for Sukarno to be taken to trial. On 10 January 1967, Nasution and the MPRS assembled again as Sukarno submitted his report (he did not deliver it in person as a speech) which was hoped to finally address the issue of G30S. Dubbed the Pelengkap Nawaksara (Nawaksara Addendum), the report spoke about Sukarno's insistence on calling G30S the 1 October Movement (Gestok). On G30S, Sukarno said that PKI made a big mistake on the morning of 1 October but also added that this was due to the cunning of the neo-colonialists.

In a subtle jab towards Nasution, Sukarno added that if he was going to be blamed for the G30S, the Minister of Defense and Security at the time should also be blamed for not seeing the G30S coming and stopping it before it happened. The report was once again rejected by the MPRS. In February 1967, the DPR called for an MPRS Special Session in March to replace Sukarno with Suharto. Sukarno seemed resigned to his fate, officially handing day-to-day control of the Government to Suharto on 22 February 1967 and requiring him only to report if necessary. Finally, on 12 March 1967, Sukarno was officially removed from power by the MPRS. Nasution then swore Suharto into office as the acting president. A year later on 27 March 1968, Nasution presided over Suharto's election and inauguration as full President.

== In the New Order ==
=== Fall from power and opposition ===
Despite the assistance that Nasution gave him in his rise to power, Suharto viewed Nasution as a rival and immediately began working to remove him from power. In 1969, Nasution was barred from speaking at Seskoad and the Military Academy. In 1971, Nasution was suddenly discharged from military service at the age of 53, two years before the designated retirement age of 55. Nasution was finally removed in 1972 as the new batch of MPR members (elected during the 1971 legislative election) came in and elected Idham Chalid to replace him as MPR chairman. Nasution's drastic fall earned him the nickname of gelandangan politik (political bum). Once he was removed from positions of power, Nasution developed into a political opponent of the New Order regime. By the late 70s, Suharto's regime had turned from popular to authoritarian and corrupt. At this time many voices began to openly speak out and criticise the regime. After the 1977 legislative election, in which there was alleged electoral fraud by Suharto's Golkar party, Nasution said that there was a crisis in leadership in the New Order.

In July 1978, together with former vice-president Hatta, Nasution set up the Institute for Constitutional Awareness Foundation (YLKB). Suharto's government moved quickly and did not allow YLKB to conduct its first meeting in January 1979. Nasution and the YLKB did not give up. In August 1979, it managed to hold a meeting which DPR members attended. Perhaps significantly, ABRI members attended the meeting. During the meeting, Nasution criticised the New Order for not fully implementing Pancasila and the 1945 Constitution. Suharto did not take the criticism lightly. On 27 March 1980, at an ABRI Meeting, Suharto in a speech said that ABRI members should be ready to defend their seats in the DPR and that they should align themselves with forces that are for Pancasila and the 1945 Constitution such as Golkar. Suharto followed this up with another speech on 16 April 1980, on the occasion of Kopassus' anniversary. in which he denied allegations of corruption and claimed that if he had to, he would kidnap MPR members if that would prevent the MPR from having the two-thirds majority required to change the constitution.

Nasution then decided that the opponents of the regime should make a major statement. He gathered ABRI members who were disgruntled with the Suharto regime such as former governor of Jakarta Ali Sadikin, former chief of police Hoegeng Imam Santoso, and former deputy army chief of staff Mochamad Jasin. Former prime ministers Mohammad Natsir and Burhanuddin Harahap as well as PDRI chairman Syafruddin Prawiranegara joined in. Together with many other well-known critics of the government, they signed a petition that would become known as Petisi 50 (Petition of Fifty), so-called because there were 50 signatories. The petition was signed on 5 May 1980 and delivered to the DPR on 13 May 1980. It called for Suharto to stop interpreting Pancasila to suit his ends and for ABRI to be neutral in politics instead of favouring Golkar. The DPR, especially members of the United Development Party (PPP) and the Indonesian Democratic Party took the petition seriously and asked Suharto to respond on the issue. Suharto replied that his speeches on 27 March 1980 and 16 April 1980 were sufficient response. He added if there were any problems, the DPR could pass a motion for a special investigation. Here the PPP and PDI members stopped, knowing that their motion would be defeated because of Golkar's dominance. For signatories to the petition such as Nasution, Suharto imposed travel bans and made business dealings difficult so that the petition signatories would have a hard time making a living.

=== Reconciliation ===
By the beginning of the 1990s, Suharto was beginning to adopt a policy of political openness, and enforcement of the Petition of 50 Signatories' punishment was loosened. In June 1993, when he was in hospital because of illness, Nasution was visited by the army's top brass. He then received a visit from BJ Habibie, Suharto's Minister of Technology. Habibie then invited Nasution and the other signatories to visit his shipyard and the aircraft factory which had been put under his jurisdiction. The government also began claiming that although there was a travel ban for the Petition of 50 Signatories, the ban did not apply to Nasution. For his part, Nasution denied criticising the government, preferring to call it a "difference of opinion". Finally, in July 1993, Suharto invited Nasution to the Presidential Palace for a meeting. This was followed by another meeting on 18 August 1993, after the Independence Day celebrations. Nothing political was talked about, but it was clear that both men were keen to reconcile their differences.

In an interview in 1995, Nasution encouraged Indonesia to go through a reconciliation process so that the nation could be united under the leadership of Suharto. On 5 October 1997, on the occasion of ABRI's anniversary, Nasution was given the honorary rank Jenderal Besar, a rank that he shared with Suharto and Sudirman.

== Death ==
Nasution died on 6 September 2000 in Jakarta after suffering a stroke and going into a coma. He was buried at the Kalibata Heroes' Cemetery, South Jakarta.

== Family ==
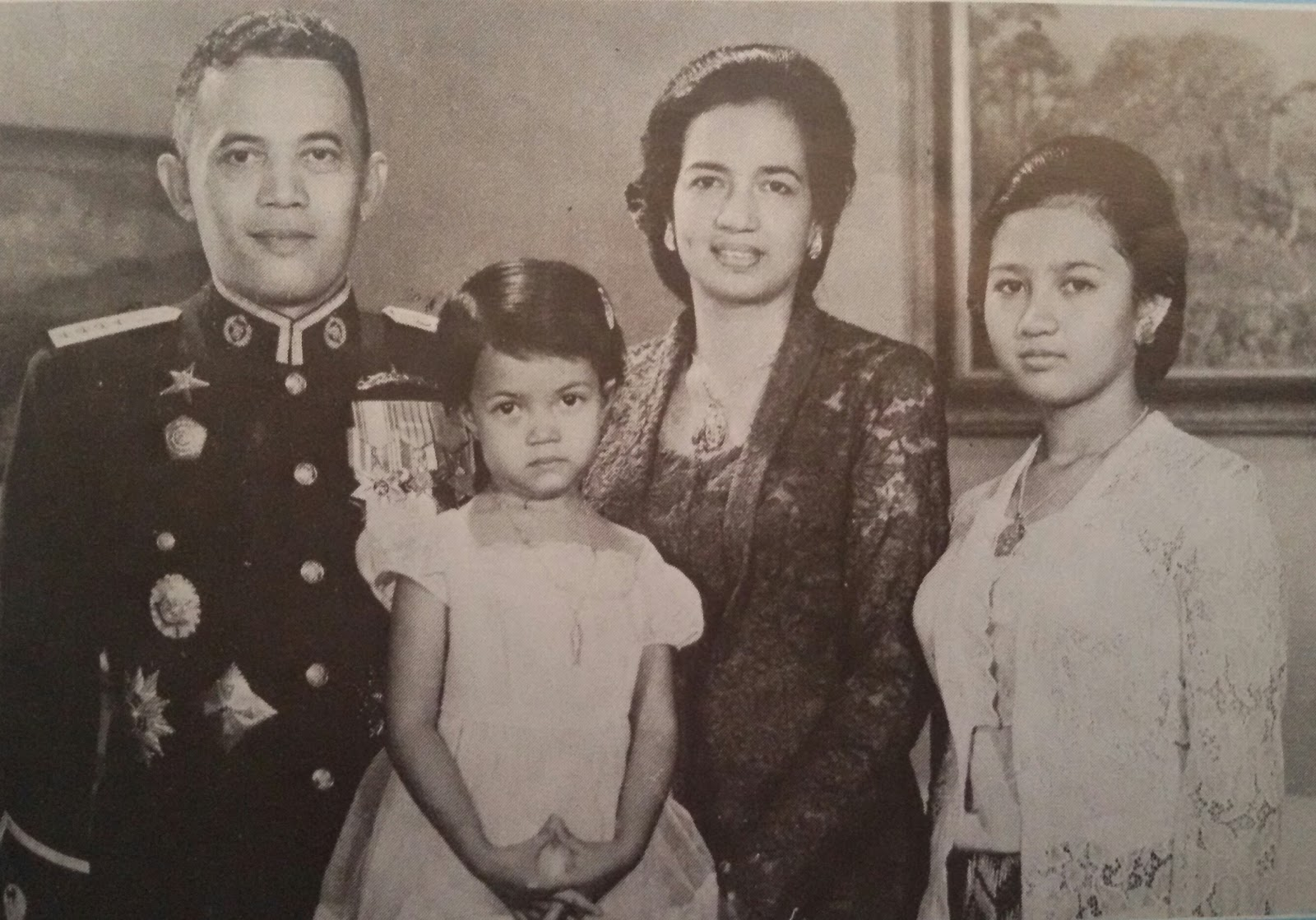
AH Nasution with his family in 1965

Nasution was married to Johanna Sunarti (1 November 1923 – 20 March 2010), a Surabaya-born humanitarian, with whom he had two daughters, Hendriyanti Sahara (24 February 1952 – 18 June 2021) and Ade Irma Suryani.

== Miscellaneous ==
Umar Wirahadikusumah served as Nasution's adjutant from 1946 to 1947.

The former residence of Nasution at Jl Teuku Umar No 40, Menteng, in central Jakarta has been converted into a museum.

== Honours ==
As an officer in the Indonesian Army (1945–1971), and then as Speaker of the People's Consultative Assembly (1966–1972), he received several Star Decorations, namely:

=== National honours ===
- Star of the Republic of Indonesia, 2nd Class (Indonesian: Bintang Republik Indonesia Adipradana) (26 September 1997)
- Star of the Republic of Indonesia, 3rd Class (Indonesian: Bintang Republik Indonesia Utama) (10 January 1963)
- Star of Mahaputera, 2nd Class (Indonesian: Bintang Mahaputera Adipradana) (1961)
- The Sacred Star (Indonesian: Bintang Sakti)
- Military Distinguished Service Star (Indonesian: Bintang Dharma)
- Star of Yudha Dharma, 1st Class (Indonesian: Bintang Yudha Dharma Utama)
- Star of Kartika Eka Paksi, 1st Class (Indonesian: Bintang Kartika Eka Paksi Utama)
- Star of Jalasena, 1st Class (Indonesian: Bintang Jalasena Utama)
- Star of Swa Bhuwana Paksa, 1st Class (Indonesian: Bintang Swa Bhuwana Paksa Utama)
- Star of Bhayangkara, 1st Class (Indonesian: Bintang Bhayangkara Utama)
- Guerrilla Star (Indonesian: Bintang Gerilya)
- Indonesian Armed Forces "8 Years" Service Star (Indonesian: Bintang Sewindu Angkatan Perang Republik Indonesia)
- Anniversary of the Struggle for Independence Medal (Indonesian: Satyalancana Peringatan Perjuangan Kemerdekaan)
- Military Long Service Medal, 16 Years Service (Indonesian: Satyalancana Kesetiaan XVI Tahun)
- Navy Distinguished Service Medal (Indonesian: Satyalancana Jasadharma Angkatan Laut)
- 1st Independence War Medal (Indonesian: Satyalancana Perang Kemerdekaan I)
- 2nd Independence War Medal (Indonesian: Satyalancana Perang Kemerdekaan II)
- Military Operational Service Medal for Madiun 1947 (Indonesian: Satyalancana G.O.M I)
- Military Operational Service Medal for Angkatan Ratu Adil 1947 (Indonesian: Satyalancana G.O.M II)
- Military Operational Service Medal for Republik Malaku Selatan 1950 (Indonesian: Satyalancana G.O.M III)
- Military Operational Service Medal for Sulawesi 1958 (Indonesian: Satyalancana G.O.M IV)
- Military Service Medal for Irian Jaya 1962 (Indonesian: Satyalancana Satya Dharma)
- Northern Borneo Military Campaign Medal (Indonesian: Satyalancana Wira Dharma)
- Medal for Combat Against Communists (Indonesian: Satyalancana Penegak)

=== Foreign honours ===
- Germany: Grand Cross of the Order of Merit of the Federal Republic of Germany (1963)
- Netherlands: Knight Grand Cross of the Order of Orange-Nassau (1971)
- Thailand: Knight Grand Cross of the Most Exalted Order of the White Elephant (1960)
- Ethiopian Empire: Grand Cross and Collar of the Order of the Holy Trinity (1968)
- Yugoslavia:
  - First Rank of the Order of the Yugoslav Flag with Sash (1961)
  - First Rank of the Order of the People's Army with Laurer Wreath (1960)
- Philippines:
  - Grand Cross (Datu) of the Order of Sikatuna (1967)
  - Commander of the Philippine Legion of Honor (1963)
- Soviet Union: Jubilee Medal "Twenty Years of Victory in the Great Patriotic War 1941–1945"

== Notes ==
Political offices
Preceded by Chaerul Saleh	Speaker of the People's Consultative Assembly; 1966–1971	Succeeded by Idham Chalid
Preceded by Djuanda Kartawidjaja	Minister of Defense and Security; 1959–1966	Succeeded by Sarbini Martodihardjo
Military offices
Preceded by Soerjadi Soerjadarma as Chairman of the Joint Chiefs of Staff	Chief of Staff of the Indonesian Armed Forces; 1962–1966	Succeeded by Suharto as Commander of the Armed Forces
Preceded by Tahi Bonar Simatupang as Chief of Staff of the War Forces	Chairman of the Joint Chiefs of Staff; 1955–1959	Succeeded by Soerjadi Soerjadarma
Preceded by Bambang Utoyo	Chief of Staff of the Indonesian Army; 1955–1962	Succeeded by Ahmad Yani
Preceded by Djatikoesoemo	Chief of Staff of the Indonesian Army; 1949–1952	Succeeded by Bambang Soegeng
