= Pagar Gunung, Mandailing Natal =

Pagar Gunung
- Location in North Sumatra and Indonesia Pagar Gunung (Indonesia)
- Coordinates: 0°33′58.21″N 99°32′48.61″E
- Country: Indonesia
- Province: North Sumatra
- Regency: Mandailing Natal Regency
- District: Kotanopan District
- Elevation: 2,927 ft (892 m)

Population (2010)
  - Total: 178
- Time zone: UTC+7 (Indonesia Western Standard Time)

Pagar Gunung is a village in Kotanopan district, Mandailing Natal Regency in North Sumatra province, Indonesia. Its population is 178.

== Climate ==
Pagar Gunung has a tropical rainforest climate (Af) with heavy to very heavy rainfall year-round.

Climate data for Pagar Gunung
Month	Jan	Feb	Mar	Apr	May	Jun	Jul	Aug	Sep	Oct	Nov	Dec	Year
Mean daily maximum °C (°F)	27.6 (81.7)	27.9 (82.2)	27.9 (82.2)	27.8 (82.0)	27.9 (82.2)	27.6 (81.7)	27.4 (81.3)	27.3 (81.1)	27.1 (80.8)	26.8 (80.2)	26.9 (80.4)	27.1 (80.8)	27.4 (81.4)
Daily mean °C (°F)	21.9 (71.4)	22.0 (71.6)	22.2 (72.0)	22.4 (72.3)	22.3 (72.1)	21.7 (71.1)	21.5 (70.7)	21.5 (70.7)	21.7 (71.1)	21.7 (71.1)	21.9 (71.4)	21.8 (71.2)	21.9 (71.4)
Mean daily minimum °C (°F)	16.3 (61.3)	16.2 (61.2)	16.6 (61.9)	17.0 (62.6)	16.7 (62.1)	15.9 (60.6)	15.7 (60.3)	15.7 (60.3)	16.3 (61.3)	16.7 (62.1)	16.9 (62.4)	16.6 (61.9)	16.4 (61.5)
Average rainfall mm (inches)	282 (11.1)	243 (9.6)	346 (13.6)	413 (16.3)	260 (10.2)	214 (8.4)	234 (9.2)	216 (8.5)	345 (13.6)	401 (15.8)	359 (14.1)	357 (14.1)	3,670 (144.5)
Source: Climate-Data.org
