= Bambang Soegeng =

Indonesian general (1913–1977)

Lieutenant General (Ret.) Bambang Soegeng
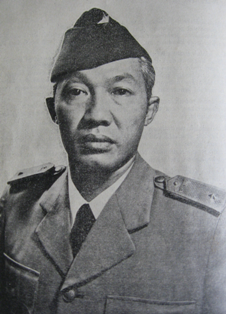

Ambassador of Indonesia to Japan
- In office October 1960 – April 1964
- Preceded by: Asmaun
- Succeeded by: Harsono Reksoatmodjo

Ambassador of Indonesia to the Holy See
- In office 15 August 1956 – 1959

Ambassador of Indonesia to Brazil
- In office 1964–1965

Personal details
- Born: 31 October 1913 Magelang, Dutch East Indies
- Died: 22 June 1977 (aged 63)

Military service
- Allegiance: Empire of Japan (1942–1945); Indonesia (1945–1955)
- Branch/service: PETA; Indonesian Army
- Years of service: 1942–1955
- Rank: Lieutenant general
- Commands: Army Chief of Staff; Kodam V/Brawijaya
- Battles/wars: Indonesian National Revolution

Lieutenant General (Ret.) Bambang Soegeng (EYD: Bambang Sugeng; 31 October 1913 – 22 June 1977) was an Indonesian military officer and diplomat. He was the Chief of Staff of the Indonesian Army between 1952 and 1955, and was later ambassador to the Holy See, Japan and Brazil.

Soegeng was born in Magelang and completed high school education before dropping out. He worked as a civil servant for some time, and joined the PETA military organization during the Japanese occupation of the Dutch East Indies, rising to become a battalion commander. After the proclamation of Indonesian independence, he organized a unit in the nascent BKR and later rose to the rank of a divisional commander, approving the General Offensive of 1 March 1949. He became the military commander for East Java before becoming Army Chief of Staff in 1952, during a period of tension between the civilian government and the army. He resigned in 1955, and during his ensuing diplomatic career attempted to garner support for Indonesia in the West New Guinea dispute.

== Early life ==
Soegeng was born on 31 October 1913 in the village of Tegalrejo, Magelang, as the eldest of six children. He attended a Hollandsch-Inlandsche School (HIS, primary school equivalent) in Purwakarta and later a MULO in Purwokerto. He later graduated from an AMS in Yogyakarta, where he had studied western literature. He enrolled at Batavia's Rechts Hogeschool, but did not complete his education due to financial pressures.

== Career ==
After dropping out of Rechts Hogeschool, Soegeng found work as a cleric for the colonial government's Department of Internal Affairs, before later working at the local government at Temanggung Regency.

=== Japanese occupation ===
During the Japanese occupation of the Dutch East Indies, Soegeng joined the Japanese-founded Defenders of the Homeland (PETA), where he was part of the 2nd battalion, based in Magelang, as a company commander. In this battalion, several later notable personnel who served under him include Ahmad Yani and Sarwo Edhie Wibowo. He was promoted to battalion commander and reassigned to Gombong.

=== Revolution ===
Following the surrender of Japan, Soegeng moved to Temanggung where he formed a regiment for the People's Security Agency (BKR) for the Temanggung and Wonosobo area, which was organized under Sudirman's fifth division. He was appointed a lieutenant colonel, and he managed to disarm the Japanese garrison without significant incident and took the Japanese soldiers as prisoners of war with little issue. He undertook a guerilla campaign in Central Java and West Java, and led operations against criminal militia groups.

Soegeng assisted Gatot Soebroto in maintaining order in Surakarta during a period of disturbance in 1948, and by the time of the Madiun Affair, Soegeng was the military governor of the Yogyakarta-Kedu-Wonosobo region. Following a "rationalization" of the army in 1948, he was made a colonel and he was appointed a divisional commander. He was the superior officer of Suharto at the time, and Soegeng gave approval to the General Offensive of 1 March 1949, which resulted in a significant Indonesian political victory.

=== Post-1949 military career ===
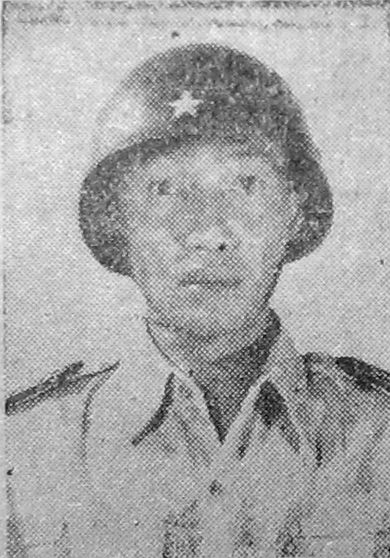
Soegeng in 1952

After the revolution concluded, Soegeng became the military commander for Kodam V/Brawijaya which covered East Java, between June 1950 and October 1952. During the 17 October affair in 1952, Soegeng was on sick leave, and a power struggle occurred between his subordinates which resulted in the temporary acting commander, Lt. Col. Suwondho, being arrested and dismissed. Soegeng, who was at the time still inactive yet considered a politically moderate and competent officer, was appointed acting Chief of Staff of the Indonesian Army on 15 December 1952 replacing Abdul Haris Nasution. Due to his illness during the coup attempt, he was seen as uninvolved in the incident, and he was considered as an acceptable compromise replacement for Nasution. He was a Major General at the time of his appointment.

The early weeks of his tenure saw a clash with the politicians in Jakarta, when he attempted to appoint Joop Warouw as the regional commander for East Indonesia. This decision, upheld by the Wilopo Cabinet, caused the resignation of its Defence Minister Hamengkubuwono IX. The Cabinet then reversed its stance in order to prevent further ministerial resignations and attempted to appoint another officer, Col. Sadikin, but this was countered by Soegeng also threatening to resign. Soegeng's resignation was rejected, and Sadikin did not indicate readiness for this appointment, resulting in Warouw maintaining his post without immediate further resignations. Soegeng was considered a sympathizer of the Indonesian National Party. Even with Soegeng's appointment, the East Java division was still dissatisfied, and in one occasion when Soegeng accompanied Wilopo on a trip to the Kodam's headquarters, they were greeted by tanks instead of the leaders and an empty headquarter office.

Soegeng once again threatened to resign in December 1953, when the Defense Minister at the time, Iwa Kusumasumantri, made several controversial appointments to the Army General Staff. Several of the territorial commanders responded to Soegeng's threat by demanding Iwa's resignation, but they were eventually convinced to back down and Soegeng withdrew his resignation once more, accepting the new appointees. Apart from these issues, Soegeng's time as Chief of Staff also saw the initiation of the numerical registration of army soldiers, and Soegeng himself was registered with the code 10001.

In February 1955, Soegeng attended a large conference of Army leaders and signed off the "Yogyakarta Charter", which called for unity in the Army in response to the split following the 17 October affair. Shortly afterwards, however, Soegeng submitted his third resignation on 2 May, which was accepted after nine days. Soegeng had felt that he was unable to implement the resolutions in the charter, furthered by the lack of government response to the demands.

=== Diplomatic career ===
Between 15 August 1956 and 1959, Soegeng was assigned as the Indonesian Ambassador to the Holy See. He then became the Ambassador to Japan starting in October 1960. During his time in Japan, Soegeng negotiated war reparations to Indonesia for the Japanese occupation, and later successfully persuaded the Japanese government to not allow the Dutch aircraft carrier HNLMS Karel Doorman to stop over in Yokohama, and lobbied for the Japanese to take Indonesia's side in the Western New Guinea dispute. After his tenure in Japan, Soegeng later became ambassador to Brazil until 1965.

== Death and legacy ==
Soegeng died on 22 June 1977, due to a lung illness. In accordance with his wishes, he was not buried at a Heroes' Cemetery, and was instead buried in Temanggung on the banks of the Progo River where several hundred pemuda had been massacred in 1949. A monument was erected at his burial site in 1985. His posthumous rank was lieutenant general. Soegeng has been proposed as a National Hero of Indonesia. Multiple roads in Central Java and the Yogyakarta Special Region are named after him.

== Bibliography ==
- Anderson, David Charles (1976). "The Military Aspects of the Madiun Affair". Indonesia. 21 (21): 1–63. doi:10.2307/3350956. hdl:1813/53613. ISSN 0019-7289. JSTOR 3350956.
- Feith, Herbert (2006). The Decline of Constitutional Democracy in Indonesia. Equinox Publishing. ISBN 978-979-3780-45-0.
- Kasmadi, Hartono; Sugito, A.T.; Wijono; Slamet (1986). Monumen perjuangan Jawa Tengah (PDF) (in Indonesian). Ministry of Education and Culture.
- McVey, Ruth (1971). "The Post-Revolutionary Transformation of the Indonesian Army". Indonesia. 11 (11): 131–176. doi:10.2307/3350748. hdl:1813/53507. ISSN 0019-7289. JSTOR 3350748.
- Nishihara, Masashi (1976). The Japanese and Sukarno's Indonesia: Tokyo-Jakarta Relations, 1951-1966. University Press of Hawaii. ISBN 978-0-8248-0379-7.

Military offices
Preceded by Abdul Haris Nasution	Indonesian Army Chief of Staff; 1952–1955	Succeeded by Zulkifli Lubis
Diplomatic posts
Preceded by Jahja daeg Nompo Mohammad; Chargé d'affaires	Ambassador of Indonesia to the Holy See; 1956-1959	Succeeded by Busono Darusman; Chargé d'affaires
Preceded by Asmaun	Ambassador of Indonesia to Japan; 1960-1964	Succeeded by Harsono Reksoatmodjo
Preceded by Abu Hanifah	Ambassador of Indonesia to Brazil; 1964-1965	Succeeded by Syarief Thayeb
