= Batahan =

- District
- Interactive map of Batahan
- Coordinates: 0°23′50.8596″N 99°9′1.3212″E
- Country: Indonesia
- Province: North Sumatra
- Regency: Mandailing Natal

Area
  - Total: 497.07 km^{2} (191.92 sq mi)

Population (2023)
  - Total: 24.189
  - Density: 0.048663/km^{2} (0.12604/sq mi)
- Time zone: UTC+7 (Western Indonesia Time)
- Postal code: 22988

Batahan is an administrative district (kecamatan) in Mandailing Natal Regency, North Sumatra Province, Indonesia.
