= Kotanopan =

- District
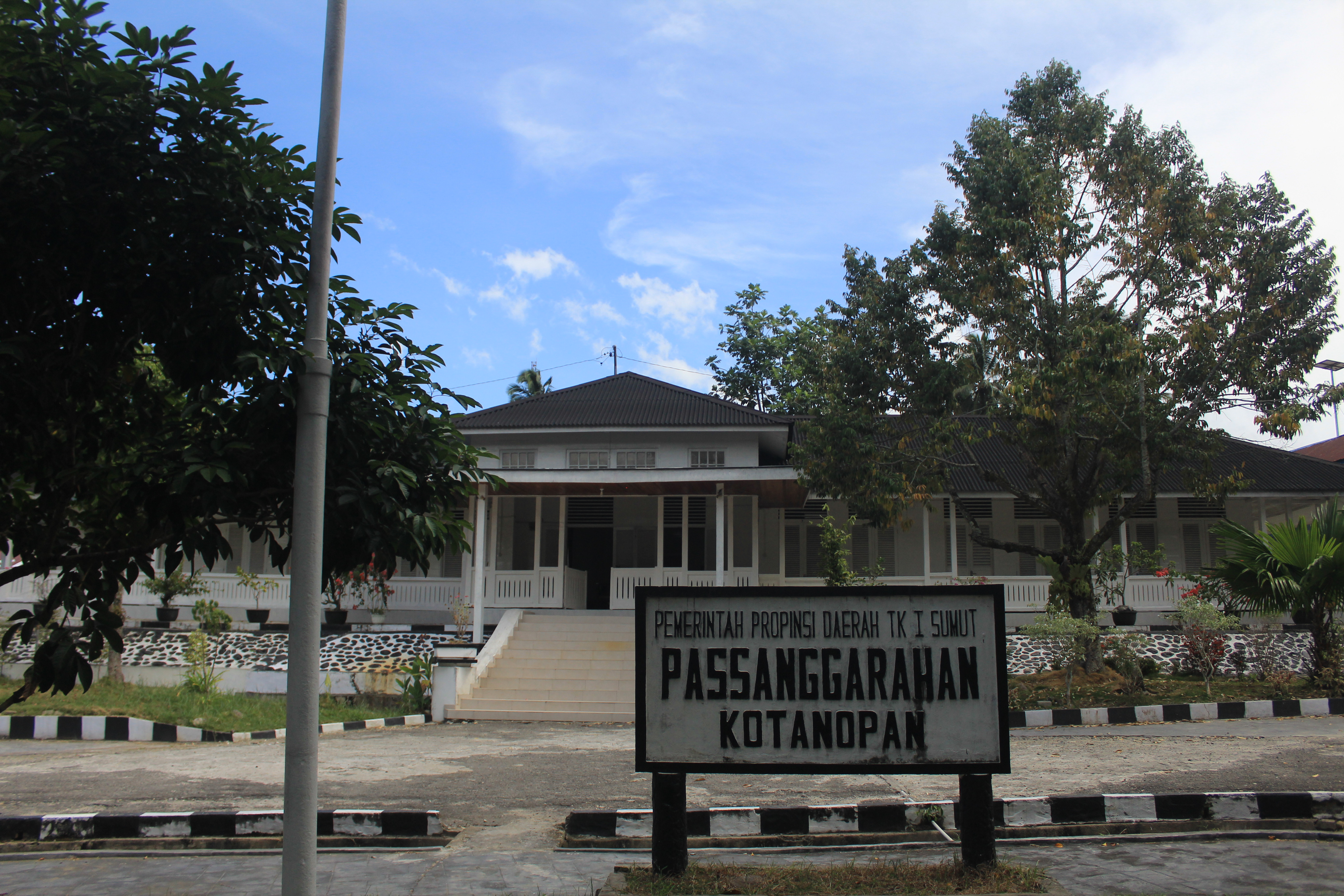
- Pasanggrahan (guesthouse) of Kotanopan

- Kotanopan within Mandailing Natal
- Coordinates: 0°40′10″N 99°42′21″E
- Country: Indonesia
- Province: North Sumatra
- Regency: Mandailing Natal

Area
  - Total: 325.15 km^{2} (125.54 sq mi)

Population (2024 est.)
  - Total: 29,504
  - Density: 90.740/km^{2} (235.01/sq mi)

Kotanopan is a district of Mandailing Natal Regency, in North Sumatra province of Indonesia. It has a population of around 30 thousand people, and historically served as the local administrative center for the Mandailing area during the colonial period.

== Geography ==
Kotanopan is located on the Gadis River valley, in hilly terrain within the Barisan Mountains. The district has an area of 325.15 square kilometers, subdivided into 34 villages and two kelurahan (subdistricts).

== History ==
Prior to European colonialism, Kotanopan sat on a trade route of camphor and benzoin being moved from its source to Srivijaya. Kotanopan was the site of the initial Dutch presence in Mandailing lands, with a Dutch fort being established in Kotanopan in 1833 during the Padri War. Padri leader Tuanku Tambusai attacked Kotanopan in May 1834 in an unsuccessful attempt to drive out the Dutch from the region. In the Dutch colonial period, Kotanopan was the seat of an onderafdeling, and the colonial government would establish a Hollandsch-Inlandsche School (a school for native elites) there.

Following the proclamation of Indonesian independence, the regency of Batanggadis was formed with Kotanopan initially becoming its seat. It was later relocated to Panyabungan, which remained as the regency seat of Mandailing Natal Regency to this day. President Sukarno briefly visited Kotanopan in June 1948 and held a public meeting there.

== Demographics ==
As of 2024, Statistics Indonesia estimated the population of the district at 29,504. The population is primarily of Mandailing origin.

== Economy ==
The local economy is largely based around agriculture, with natural rubber being a historically important product though it has been on the decline. Another notable agricultural product is Mandheling coffee, which began to be produced in Kotanopan during the colonial period. Gold is mined in the Kotanopan area, largely through small-scale unlicensed mines.

The autobus company Antar Lintas Sumatera was founded in Kotanopan.

== Notable people ==
Kotanopan is the hometown of or associated with a large number of prominent figures in Indonesian history, including:

- Abdul Haris Nasution, Indonesian Army commander (born in Kotanopan).
- Adam Malik, Vice President of Indonesia (parents born in Kotanopan).
- Todung Mulya Lubis, lawyer and activist (born in Kotanopan).
- Todung Sutan Gunung Mulia, education minister and Christian figure (taught in Kotanopan).
- Yunan Nasution, journalist and politician (born in Kotanopan).
