= Antar Lintas Sumatera =

Indonesian bus company

Perusahaan Otobus Antar Lintas Sumatera
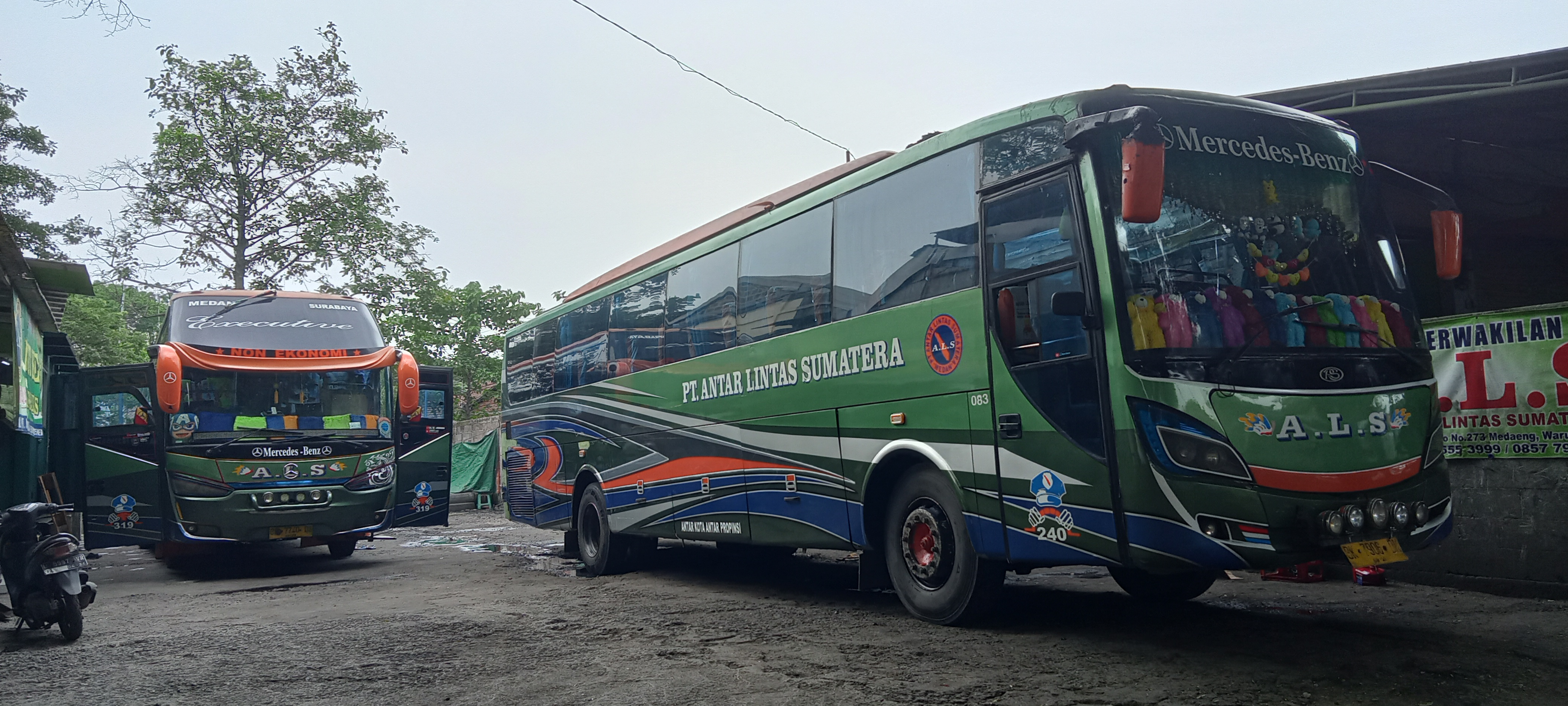
- An ALS bus in the Medan - Jember route
- Founded: 1966
- Headquarters: Medan, North Sumatra
- Fleet: ~400
- Chief executive: Chandra Lubis

Perusahaan Otobus Antar Lintas Sumatera, abbreviated PO ALS or simply ALS, is an Indonesian autobus company based in Medan, North Sumatra. Founded in 1965, it primarily serves intercity bus routes between cities in Sumatra, in addition to routes to various cities in Java.

== History ==
The company was founded in 1965 (and officially registered in September 1966) at the town of Kotanopan, in Mandailing Natal Regency of North Sumatra. Its founders were seven produce merchants with familial relations, and the company initially used two converted Chevrolet trucks for the Kotanopan to Medan service. As the company grew, it established a Medan to Bukittinggi service, and by 1972 it had routes serving other major cities in Sumatra such as Bandar Lampung, Jambi, Palembang and Padang. It also relocated its head office to Medan.

ALS had begun serving routes to Java during the 1970s, prior to the establishment of RORO services between Java and Sumatra. However, due to a lack of ships capable of carrying vehicles at the time, ALS made arrangements with ferry companies to transport the passengers from Bakauheni to Merak. When RORO ferry services became available, ALS expanded its list of destinations to Java, reaching Malang and Jember in East Java and extending to Bali.

=== Incidents ===
On 6 May 2026, an ALS bus collided with a fuel tanker in North Musi Rawas, killing at least 16 people.

== Fleet and routes ==
The company's primary transit hub is located at Bukittinggi due to the city's central location in Sumatra. ALS' Medan – Jember service, at 2,839 kilometres (1,764 mi), is the longest bus route in Indonesia as of 2022. It operates around 400 mostly Mercedes-Benz buses as of 2020, with some of the buses owned by the families of the founders instead of by the company itself.
