= Heptapleurum aromaticum =

Conservation status
- Least Concern (IUCN 3.1)

Scientific classification
- Kingdom: Plantae
- Clade: Tracheophytes
- Clade: Angiosperms
- Clade: Eudicots
- Clade: Asterids
- Order: Apiales
- Family: Araliaceae
- Genus: Heptapleurum
- Species: H. aromaticum

Binomial name
- Heptapleurum aromaticum (Blume) Boerl. (1890)

Synonyms
- Agalma aromaticum (Blume) Seem. (1854); Agalma horsfieldii (Miq.) Seem. (1864); Aralia aromatica Blume (1826); Hedera aromatica Blume (1824); Heptapleurum confine (Miq.) Seem. (1865); Heptapleurum horsfieldii (Miq.) Boerl. (1890); Paratropia aromatica (Blume) Miq. (1856); Paratropia confinis Miq. (1856); Paratropia horsfieldii Miq. (1856); Schefflera aromatica (Blume) Harms (1894); Schefflera confinis (Miq.) R.Vig. (1909); Schefflera horsfieldii (Miq.) Harms (1894)

Species of shrub

Heptapleurum aromaticum is a shrub in the family Araliaceae which is found in Indonesia.

== Names ==
It is locally known as alngit by the people around Toba Lake in North Sumatra. but the vernacular name simar ebe-ebe has also been recorded for it in another area of the same province. In the Javanese language it is known as ki puyu.

== Description ==
This Heptapleurum is a shrub growing three to twelve metres in height. The young twigs are covered in a fine indumentum, later becoming covered in large lenticels as they age. The digitate leaves are spirally arranged on the branches, and have a petiole which is 16 to 55 cm in length, with stipules, and five to nine lobes (leaflets) with petiolules 3.5 to 12.5 cm in length. The petiole has lenticels at its base. The leaflets can be ovate, oblong or lanceolate in shape, are acutely acuminate, 12 to 27 cm in length and 4 to 9 cm in width, and are glabrous except at the midrib, which has a line of pubescent hairs along it on the upper side of the leaflet. The leaflets look somewhat reticulate due to numerous veins which are prominent on the underside. The margin (outline) of the leaflets is either entire or sinuously incised.

The flowers are found in groups of 10 to 35 in an umbel at the very end of the branches of a large inflorescence, itself growing at the apices of branchlets. The inflorescence is subtended with large bracts. The main rachis of the inflorescence is 7 to 20 cm long and has a mealy, stellate-hairy indumentum, at 3 to 11 cm more lateral branches (rachillae) grow from it, these themselves being branched, all these branches as long as the main rachis or shorter. The umbels have a stout peduncle, and the flowers have a 1 to 2 cm pedicle. The young calyx is sinuously toothed. The petals are valvate in bud, when mature are triangular and have a quite obtuse (blunt) tip. The stigmas have a long style in this species, 2mm or more. The disc at the centre of the flower has a flat margin.

The fruit is a globose drupe, with four to eight pyrenes (seeds, i.e. a 4 to 8-pyrenous drupe). This fruit is coloured green when unripe; as it ripens it turns first orange, then red.

== Distribution ==
Heptapleurum aromaticum is endemic to western Indonesia. It is found in the western half of Java, as well as in North Sumatra province in the otherwise impoverished flora found on the volcanic island of Samosir, and in the southwestern rainforests.

== Ecology ==
It grows in forests, at 800 to 2,250 metres elevation. On Samosir it would appear to grow as a pioneer species, but in Batang Gadis National Park it is often the most common plant occurring in the understory of montane primary forest, where it is found at densities of 7% to 17% in the forest cover. The fern Diplazium proliferum is the second most common plant in this area. At lower elevations in both primary and secondary forest it is also the second most (after Dracontomelon dao), or most, respectively, dominant understory plant, but it occurs at lower densities. On less diverse, more heavily degraded land however, it is even more dominant, occurring at up to 25% of the forest cover. Where the forest is disturbed the only understory species more common than this Heptapleurum in this area is Ganua kingiana. It flowers at the end of the rainy season, from January to July.

In Java the fruit are an important food source for Hylobates moloch gibbons.

== Conservation ==
Heptapleurum aromaticum is found in the protected area of Batang Gadis National Park.
