= Todung Mulya Lubis =

Indonesian lawyer

His Excellency Todung Mulya Lubis
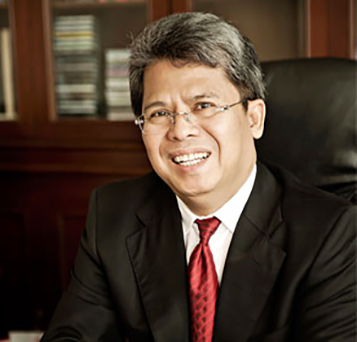

Indonesia Ambassador to Norway and Iceland
- In office 20 February 2018 – 31 January 2023
- President: Joko Widodo
- Preceded by: Yuwono A. Putranto
- Succeeded by: Teuku Faizasyah

Personal details
- Born: 4 July 1949 (age 77) Muara Botung, Kotanopan, Mandailing Natal, North Sumatra
- Spouse: Damiyati Lubis
- Children: Tondi Nikita Lubis; Oriza Sativa Lubis
- Education: Universitas Indonesia; Berkeley, Harvard
- Profession: Lawyer

Todung Mulya Lubis, S.H., L.LM. (born 4 July 1949 in Muara Botung, Kotanopan, Mandailing Natal, North Sumatra) is a lawyer and activist in Indonesia. He founded The law firm Lubis Santosa and Maulana in 1986, later Lubis Santosa and Maramis.

== Education and career ==
Lubis grew up on the island of Sumatra. After finishing primary school in Edinburgh, he went to secondary school in Pekanbaru, Riau, and senior high school in Medan. After completing his studies in high school, Lubis became interested in the legal world. He completed his undergraduate Law degree at the University of Indonesia (1974); his LLM at the University of California, Berkeley; a second LLM at Harvard Law School; and his JSD at the University of California, Berkeley. He has been a senior Adjunct Member of the Faculty of Law, University of Indonesia since 1990, where he was first appointed in 1975. From 1980–1983, he was director of Indonesia's dissident NGO, the Jakarta Legal Aid Foundation (LBH).

While still a student, Lubis became an activist. Protesting against the construction of the amusement park Taman Mini Indonesia, he argued that the support of teachers and other improvements in public service should have priority.

In 1974, before finishing law school at the University of Indonesia, Lubis interned at the Jakarta Legal Aid Foundation, where he would later become director of litigation. He founded the LBH's division for human rights, which published its first report on the state of human rights in Indonesia in 1979, forming a template for similar reports that have been published since.

In 1986 Lubis founded the law firm Lubis and Partners, which later became Lubis Santosa and Maulana Law Offices, "which comprises a major corporate practice as well as taking on human rights cases, often pro bono."

Lubis has been listed as a leading lawyer in dispute resolution in Indonesia by "The International Who's Who of Business Lawyers", as well as by the law firm guide "The Legal 500" (2006/2007).
