= Naga Juang =

- District
- Interactive map of Naga Juang
- Coordinates: 0°56′9.7364″N 99°28′58.0624″E
- Country: Indonesia
- Province: North Sumatra
- Regency: Mandailing Natal

Area
  - Total: 58.69 km^{2} (22.66 sq mi)

Population (2023)
  - Total: 5.257
  - Density: 0.08957/km^{2} (0.2320/sq mi)
- Time zone: UTC+7 (Western Indonesia Time)
- Postal code: 22975

Naga Juang is an administrative district (kecamatan) in Mandailing Natal Regency, North Sumatra Province, Indonesia.
