= Embassy of Indonesia, Brasília =

Indonesian diplomatic mission to Brazil

Embassy of the Republic of Indonesia in Brasília Kedutaan Besar Republik Indonesia di Brasília Embaixada da República da Indonésia em Brasília

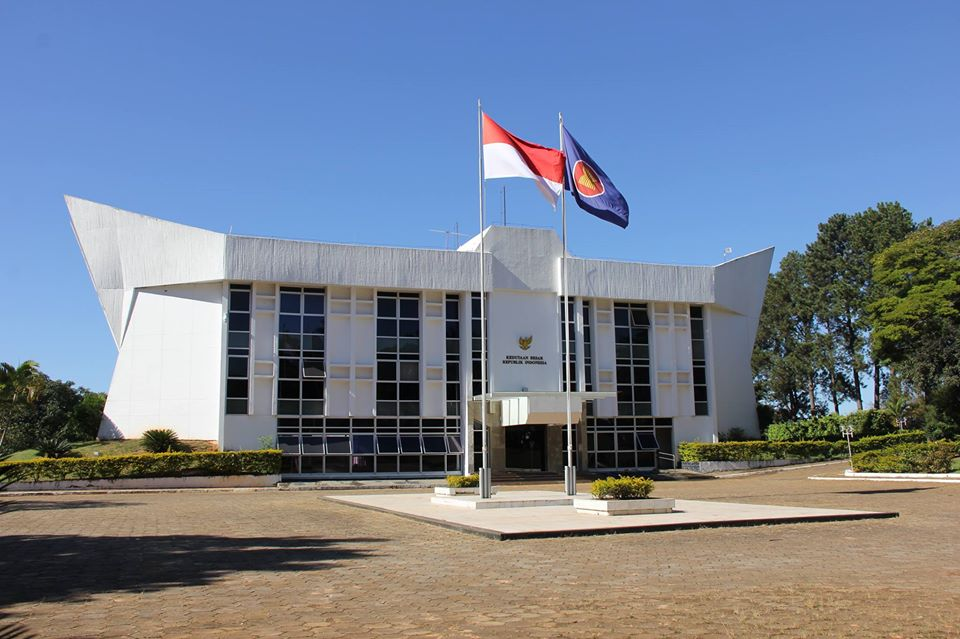
- Location: Brasília, Brazil
- Address: Avenida das Nacoes Quadra 805; Lote 20 Asa Sul; Brasília, Brasil
- Coordinates: 15.816399°S 47.885196°W
- Ambassador: Edi Yusup
- Website: kemlu.go.id/brasilia/en

The Embassy of the Republic of Indonesia in Brasília (Indonesian: Kedutaan Besar Republik Indonesia di Brasília; Portuguese: Embaixada da República da Indonésia em Brasília) is the diplomatic mission of the Republic of Indonesia to the Federative Republic of Brazil. The current ambassador, Edi Yusup, was appointed by President Joko Widodo on 7 January 2019.

== See also ==
- Brazil–Indonesia relations
- List of diplomatic missions of Indonesia
