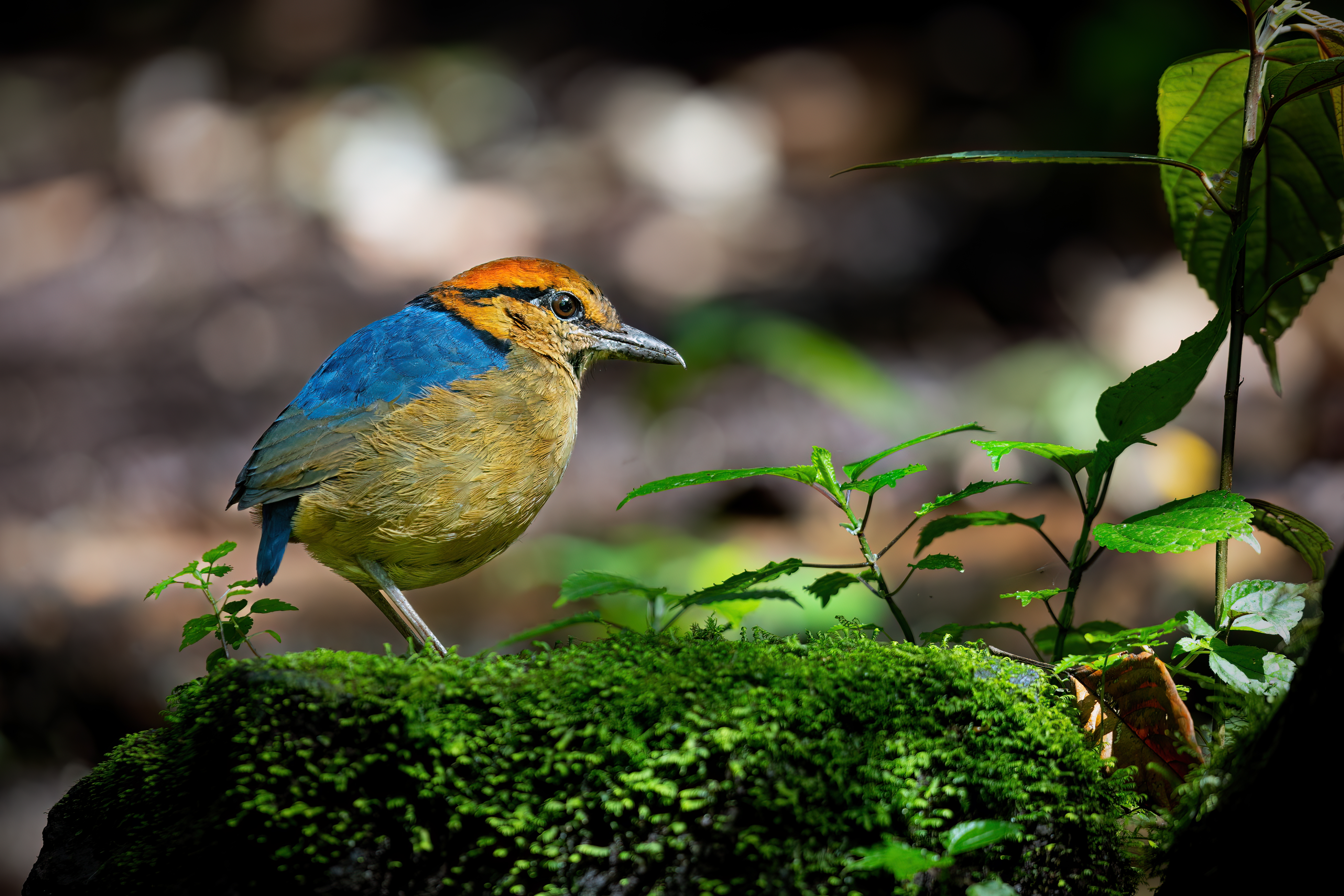
- ventral view of a museum specimen

Conservation status
- Least Concern (IUCN 3.1)

Scientific classification
- Kingdom: Animalia
- Phylum: Chordata
- Class: Aves
- Order: Passeriformes
- Family: Pittidae
- Genus: Hydrornis
- Species: H. schneideri

Binomial name
- Hydrornis schneideri (Hartert, 1909)

Synonyms
- Pitta schneideri

= Schneider's pitta =

Species of bird

Schneider's pitta (Hydrornis schneideri) is a species of bird in the family Pittidae and is endemic to the island of Sumatra, Indonesia. Its natural habitat is a subtropical or tropical moist montane forest. It is usually at an altitude between 900-2,400 meters (3,700-7,900 ft). It is threatened by habitat loss and was rediscovered in 1988 after last being seen in 1918. Its diet consists of small animals and other food. The total population has not been reliably counted. Its conservation status is at "Least Concern" meaning that it is at a low risk of extinction.
