= Brazil–Indonesia relations =

- Brazil: Indonesia

Diplomatic mission
- Brazilian Embassy, Jakarta: Indonesian Embassy, Brasília

Brazil and Indonesia established diplomatic relations in 1953. Both are large tropical countries endowed with rich natural resources, Brazil and Indonesia possess the largest tropical rain forest of the world that contains the world's richest biodiversity, which gave them a vital role in global environment issues, such as ensuring tropical forests protection. Both countries lead the list of Megadiverse countries with Indonesia second only to Brazil.

Brazil expects to expand its cooperation with Indonesia, as there is still enormous room for growth in many areas, including agriculture and high-technology industry. Both countries are members of the World Trade Organization (WTO), Forum of East Asia-Latin America Cooperation, the G20 major economies and BRICS. By first quarter of 21st-century, both nations are expected to emerge as rising global powers.

== History ==
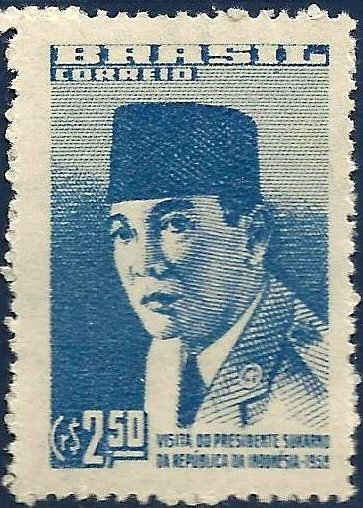
Brazilian stamp of 1959, marking a visit by Sukarno.

Diplomatic relations have been established since 1953. Indonesia has an embassy in Brasília and Brazil has an embassy in Jakarta. Although the bilateral relations was rather strained during Indonesian invasion of East Timor in 1975 until East Timor independence in 1999, since Brazil shares a solidarity and close sentiments for East Timor as common former Portuguese colonies and Portuguese-speaking countries.

== State visits ==
Brazilian President Luiz Inácio Lula da Silva visited Indonesia on 12 July 2008. This was his first visit to Indonesia and the second visit of Brazilian President to Indonesia since President Fernando Henrique Cardoso visits in January 2001. Subsequently, Indonesian President Susilo Bambang Yudhoyono paid a visit to Brazil on 18 November 2008, on his way to attend APEC Summit in Lima Peru. President Yudhoyono visited Brazil for the second time on 18 November 2009, during this visit the president of both nations signed strategic partnership agreement between Brazil and Indonesia. Previously on 14–16 October 2009 the first meeting of Brazil-Indonesia Joint Commission was conducted to discuss the action plan on strategic partnership. In November 2024, Indonesian President Prabowo Subianto visited Brazil to attend the 2024 G20 Rio de Janeiro summit and the Indonesia-Brazil Business Forum. He would later visit Brazil again on 5–9 July 2025 to attend the 17th BRICS summit and undergo a state visit. On 23 October 2025, Lula visited Indonesia to strengthen ties between the two nations.

== Economy and trade ==
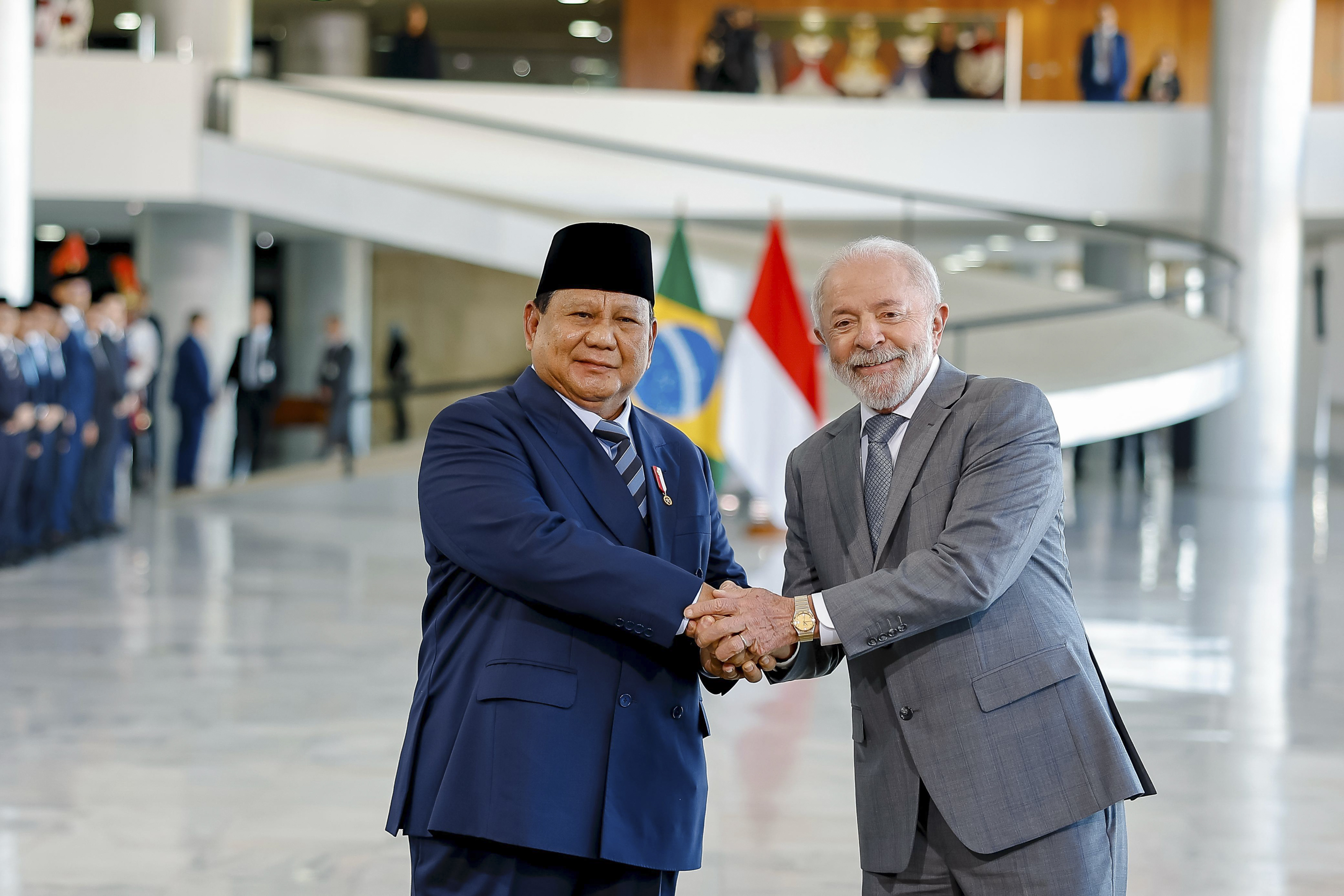
Indonesian President Prabowo Subianto and Brazilian Preaisent Luiz Inácio Lula da Silva, 9 July 2025

Currently Brazil is Indonesia's main trade partner in South America region. Bilateral trade rose by 185.09 percent to $3.25 billion in 2010 from $1.14 billion in 2006, and expected to reach beyond $4 billion by 2012. Indonesia mainly exports yarn, natural rubber, crude palm oil, fixed vegetable fats and oil, cocoa, paper, electronics and automotive spare parts and imports soybean oil, sugar cane, cotton and iron from Brazil. Brazil was interested not only in increasing exports and investing in Indonesia, but also to increase imports, such as fertilizers, textiles and palm oil and further Indonesian investment, including in infrastructure projects.

During Indonesian President Prabowo Subianto's state visit to Brazil, he and Brazilian Preaisent Luiz Inácio Lula da Silva declared plans to increase bilateral trade, which was valued at US$6.34 billion in 2024.

== Current issues ==
=== Execution of Brazilian Citizens ===
On 17 January 2015, Brazil recalled their ambassador after Indonesia ignored their pleas for clemency and executed Brazilian citizen Marco Archer Cardoso Moreira. The Brazilian president Dilma Rousseff affirmed that the execution will affect the relations between the two countries as the Brazilian ambassador was recalled to Brasília. The condemned Brazilian was of the Catholic religion, and was refused access to a priest for his last rites.

On 21 February 2015, Indonesia recalled its putative ambassador to Brazil, after Brazil postponed a ceremony sealing his appointment. This diplomatic row was the result of Indonesian execution of a Brazilian citizen for drugs trafficking in January 2015. President Dilma Rousseff said: "We think it's important there is an evolution in the situation so that we can have clarity over the state of relations between Indonesia and Brazil". Indonesian Foreign Ministry responded: "The manner in which the foreign minister of Brazil suddenly informed us of the postponement — when the ambassador designate was already at the palace, is unacceptable to Indonesia." In a by-line, Indonesian Foreign Ministry also stressed that no foreign country could interfere with Indonesian laws. This action has led Indonesian House of Representative's call to evaluate Indonesia's cooperation with Brazil, including to review defense equipments purchase from Brazil's Embraer, and to review Brazilian exporters proposal to supply meat to Indonesia.

In 2005, Indonesian government executed a Brazilian citizen who was a schizophrenic. Neither countries' ambassadors have returned to date.

== Sports relations ==
- 2025 FIFA U-17 World Cup: The Indonesia national under-17 football team lost 0-4 to Brazil in the Group H match.
- FIFAe World Cup: The Indonesian national team defeated Brazil 2-0 in the final and became champions.

== Resident diplomatic missions ==
Of Brazil

- Jakarta (Embassy)

Of Indonesia

- Brasília (Embassy)

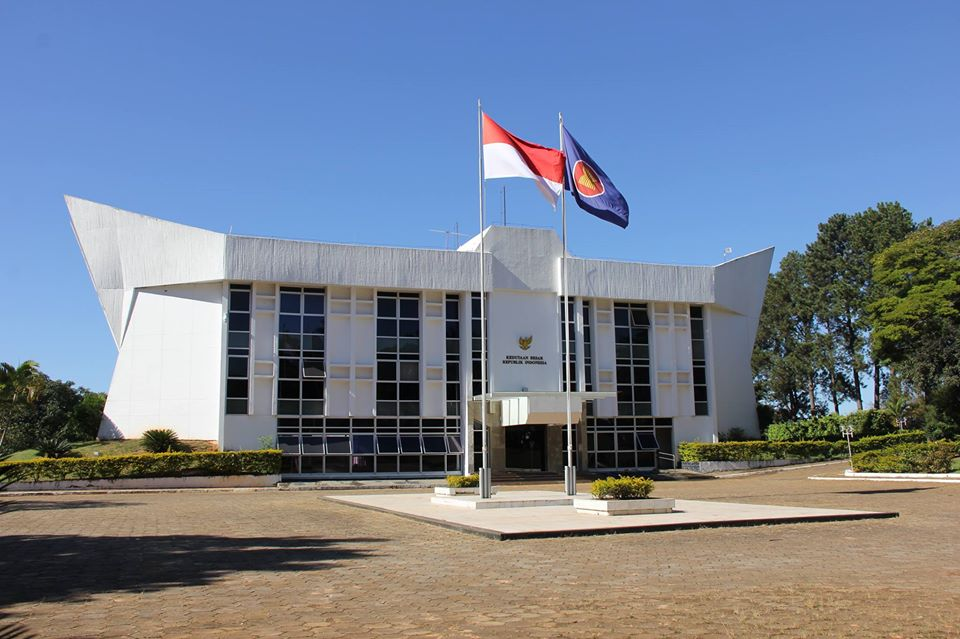
Embassy of Indonesia in Brasília
