= General Offensive of 1 March 1949 =

Indonesian military offensive during the Indonesian National Revolution

General Offensive of 1 March 1949 Serangan Umum 1 Maret 1949
- Part of the Indonesian National Revolution
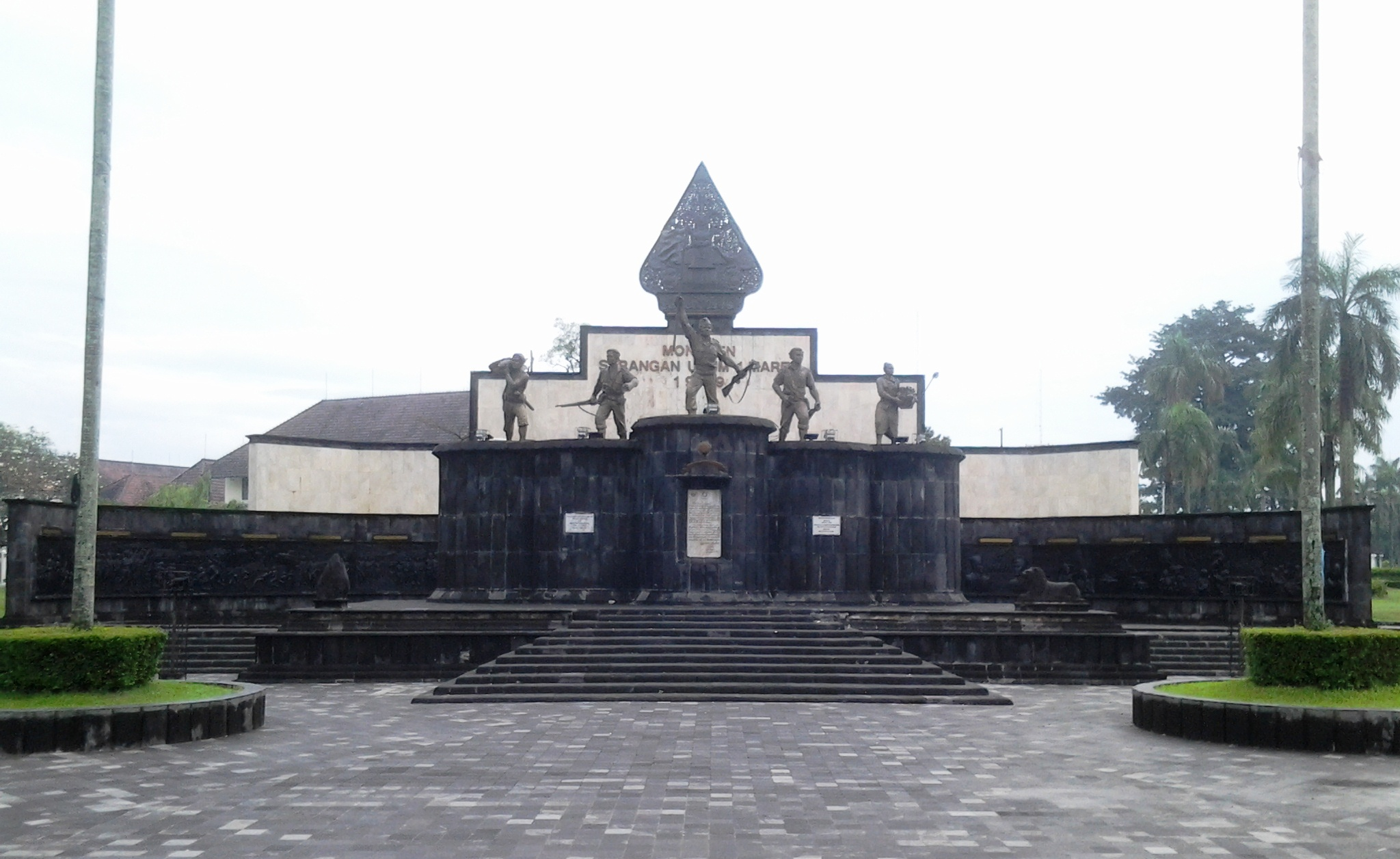
- Monument in Yogyakarta commemorating the offensive
Date	1 March 1949
Location	Yogyakarta, Indonesia
Result	City of Yogyakarta under the control of Indonesian National Armed Forces (TNI) for 6 hours, before they are retreating; Both attacks successfully repelled; Eventual withdrawal of Dutch forces on 29 June 1949

Belligerents
Indonesia	Netherlands

Commanders and leaders
(Indonesia) Hamengkubuwono IX (Indonesia) Lt. Gen. Sudirman (Indonesia) Col. Bambang Soegeng (Indonesia) Lt. Col. Suharto (Indonesia) Major Ventje Sumual	(Netherlands) Maj. Gen. Langen (Netherlands) Maj. Gen. Meyer (Netherlands) Lt. Col. Van den Berge

Units involved
Indonesian National Armed Forces	Royal Netherlands Army; Royal Netherlands East Indies Army

Strength
10,000–22,000	2,000–3,000

Casualties and losses
~300 soldiers and 53 policemen killed	~170 soldiers and policemen killed and wounded

The General Offensive of 1 March 1949 (Indonesian: Serangan Umum 1 Maret 1949; Javanese: ꦱꦺꦫꦤ꧀ꦒꦤ꧀ ꦈꦩꦸꦩ꧀ ꧇꧑꧇ ꦩꦫꦺꦠ꧀ ꧇꧑꧙꧔꧙; Dutch: Algemeen offensief van 1 maart 1949) was a military offensive during the Indonesian National Revolution where the city of Yogyakarta was held by Indonesian troops for six hours. This played an important role in causing international pressure to be exerted on the Netherlands.

== Background ==
Frustrated at negotiations with the republic and believing it weakened by both the Darul Islam and Madiun insurgencies, the Dutch launched a military offensive on 19 December 1948 which it termed 'Operatie Kraai' (Operation Crow). By the following day it had conquered the city of Surakarta and Yogyakarta, the location of the temporary republican capital. By the end of December, all major republican-held cities in Java and Sumatra were in Dutch hands. The republican president, vice-president, and all but six Republic of Indonesia ministers were captured by Dutch troops and exiled to Bangka Island off the east coast of Sumatra. In areas surrounding Yogyakarta and Surakarta, republican forces refused to surrender and continued to wage a guerrilla war under the leadership of republican military chief of staff General Sudirman who had escaped the Dutch offensives. An emergency republican government, the Emergency Government of the Republic of Indonesia (PDRI), was established in West Sumatra.

== The offensive ==
In early 1949, Hamengkubuwono IX conceived the idea of a major offensive to be launched against Yogyakarta and the Dutch troops occupying it. The purpose of this offensive was to show to the world that Indonesia still existed and that it was not ready to surrender. The idea was suggested to General Sudirman, the Commander of the Indonesian Army and received his approval. In February 1949, Hamengkubuwono IX had a meeting with then Lieutenant Colonel Suharto, the man chosen by Sudirman to be the field commander for the offensive. After this discussion, preparations were made for the offensive. This involved intensified guerilla attacks in villages and towns around Yogyakarta so as to make the Dutch station more troops outside of Yogyakarta and thin the numbers in the city itself. On 1 March 1949 at 6 AM, Suharto and his troops launched the 1 March General Offensive. The offensive caught the Dutch by surprise. For his part, Hamengkubuwono IX allowed his palace to be used as a hide out for the troops. For six hours, Indonesian troops maintained control of Yogyakarta before finally retreating. The United Nations observers mentioned Dutch had successfully repelled the attacks.

== Aftermath ==
The United Nations Security Council adopted United Nations Security Council Resolution 63 on 24 December 1948, in response to a report by the Committee of Good Offices the Council called upon the parties to cease hostilities and to release the President of the Republic of Indonesia and other political prisoners arrested since 18 December 1948. On 29 June 1949 Yogyakarta was cleared from Dutch forces under the pressure from the United Nations.

== Legacy ==
In later years, after Suharto became second president of Indonesia, The offensive, later known in Indonesia as Serangan Oemoem (new spelling: Serangan Umum, 'General Offensive'), raised myth of Suharto as national hero by retaking the city from the Dutch for six hours. The offensive also commemorated by a large monument in Yogyakarta. The "Six hours in Yogyakarta" are celebrated every 1 March with parades all over the city and other celebrations.
