= Madhuca kingiana =

Conservation status
- Near Threatened (IUCN 3.1)

Scientific classification
- Kingdom: Plantae
- Clade: Embryophytes
- Clade: Tracheophytes
- Clade: Angiosperms
- Clade: Eudicots
- Clade: Asterids
- Order: Ericales
- Family: Sapotaceae
- Genus: Madhuca
- Species: M. kingiana

Binomial name
- Madhuca kingiana (Brace ex King & Gamble) H.J.Lam

Synonyms
- Bassia kingiana Brace ex King & Gamble; Ganua glaberrima (H.J.Lam) H.J.Lam; Ganua kingiana (Brace ex King & Gamble) Assem; Madhuca glaberrima H.J.Lam

Species of tree

Madhuca kingiana is a tree in the family Sapotaceae. It is named for the botanist George King.

== Description ==
Madhuca kingiana grows up to 20 metres (70 ft) tall, with a trunk diameter of up to 20 cm (8 in). The bark is greyish brown. Inflorescences bear up to six flowers.

== Distribution and habitat ==
Madhuca kingiana is native to Sumatra, Peninsular Malaysia and Borneo. Its habitat is lowland mixed dipterocarp forest to 1,800 m (5,900 ft) altitude.

== Conservation ==
Madhuca kingiana has been assessed as near threatened on the IUCN Red List. The species is threatened by logging and conversion of land for palm oil plantations.
