= Panyabungan =

Town and district in North Sumatra Province, Indonesia

Coordinates: 0°51′N 99°33′E

Panyabungan is a town and an administrative district (kecamatan) in the North Sumatra province of Indonesia and it is the seat (capital) of Mandailing Natal Regency.

The district covers an area of 259.77 km^{2} and had a population of 77,449 at the 2010 Census and 90,049 the 2020 Census; the official estimate as at mid 2024 was 95,473. It is bordered by seven other districts of the regency - Panyabungan Timur (East), Tambangan, Lembah Sorik Marapi, Panyabungan Selatan (South), Panyabungan Barat (West), Huta Bargot and Panyabungan Utara (North) - and by one district of Padang Lawas Regency (Baruman District).

== Villages ==
The district comprises 9 urban villages (kelurahan) and 30 rural villages (desa) as follows (with their post codes).

- Adian Jior (22912)
- Aek Banir (22912)
- Aek Mata (22912)
- Darussalam (22912)
- Gunung Barani (22912)
- Gunung Manaon (22912)
- Gunung Tua Jae (22918)
- Gunung Tua Julu (22918)
- Gunung Tua Tonga (22918)
- Huta Lombang Lubis (22912)
- Kota Siantar (22919) (kelurahan)
- Ipar Bondar (22918)
- Kampung Padang (22912)
- Kayu Jati (22919) (kelurahan)
- Lumban Pasir (22912)
- Manyabar (22912)
- Manyabar Jae (22912)
- Pagaran Tonga (22912)
- Panggorengan (22912)
- Panyabungan Jae (22917)
- Panyabungan Julu (22916)
- Panyabungan Tonga (22916)
- Perbangunan (22912)
- Pasar Hilir (22916) (kelurahan)
- Pidoli Dolok (22915) (kelurahan)
- Pidoli Lombang (22915)
- Salam Bue (22912)
- Sarak Matua (22912)
- Sigalapang Julu (22912)
- Siobon Julu (22912)
- Sipapaga (22912)
- Sopobatu (22912)
- Panyabungan II (22913) (kelurahan)
- Panyabungan III (22911) (kelurahan)
- Panyabungan I (22912) (kelurahan)
- Sipolu-Polu (22912) (kelurahan)
- Dalan Lidang (22912) (kelurahan)
- Siobon Jae (22912)
- Saba Jambu (22912)

Of the urban kelurahan, Panyabungan II had 7,777 inhabitants as at mid 2023, Panyabungan III had 4,043 inhabitants, Panyabungan I had 806, Sipolu-Polu had 10,721, Dalan Lidang had 5,113, Kota Siantar had 6,936, Kayu Jati had 4,880, Pasar Hilir had 2,177 and Pidoli Dolok had 3,445. The most populated desa was Pidoli Lombang, with 6,919 inhabitants in mid 2023.

== Climate ==
Panyabungan has a tropical rainforest climate (Af) with heavy to very heavy rainfall year-round.

Climate data for Panyabungan
Month	Jan	Feb	Mar	Apr	May	Jun	Jul	Aug	Sep	Oct	Nov	Dec	Year
Mean daily maximum °C (°F)	31.0 (87.8)	31.1 (88.0)	31.3 (88.3)	31.2 (88.2)	31.3 (88.3)	31.0 (87.8)	30.8 (87.4)	30.6 (87.1)	30.3 (86.5)	30.2 (86.4)	30.2 (86.4)	30.3 (86.5)	30.8 (87.4)
Daily mean °C (°F)	25.6 (78.1)	25.5 (77.9)	25.9 (78.6)	26.1 (79.0)	26.0 (78.8)	25.6 (78.1)	25.3 (77.5)	25.3 (77.5)	25.2 (77.4)	25.4 (77.7)	25.4 (77.7)	25.3 (77.5)	25.6 (78.0)
Mean daily minimum °C (°F)	20.2 (68.4)	20.0 (68.0)	20.6 (69.1)	21.0 (69.8)	20.8 (69.4)	20.2 (68.4)	19.9 (67.8)	20.0 (68.0)	20.2 (68.4)	20.6 (69.1)	20.6 (69.1)	20.4 (68.7)	20.4 (68.7)
Average rainfall mm (inches)	302 (11.9)	248 (9.8)	322 (12.7)	337 (13.3)	238 (9.4)	170 (6.7)	192 (7.6)	212 (8.3)	287 (11.3)	361 (14.2)	348 (13.7)	365 (14.4)	3,382 (133.3)
Source: Climate-Data.org
