= Mandailing Natal Regency =

Regency in North Sumatra, Indonesia

Coordinates: 0.7838°N 99.2549°E

Mandailing Natal Regency Kabupaten Mandailing Natal Madina
- Regency
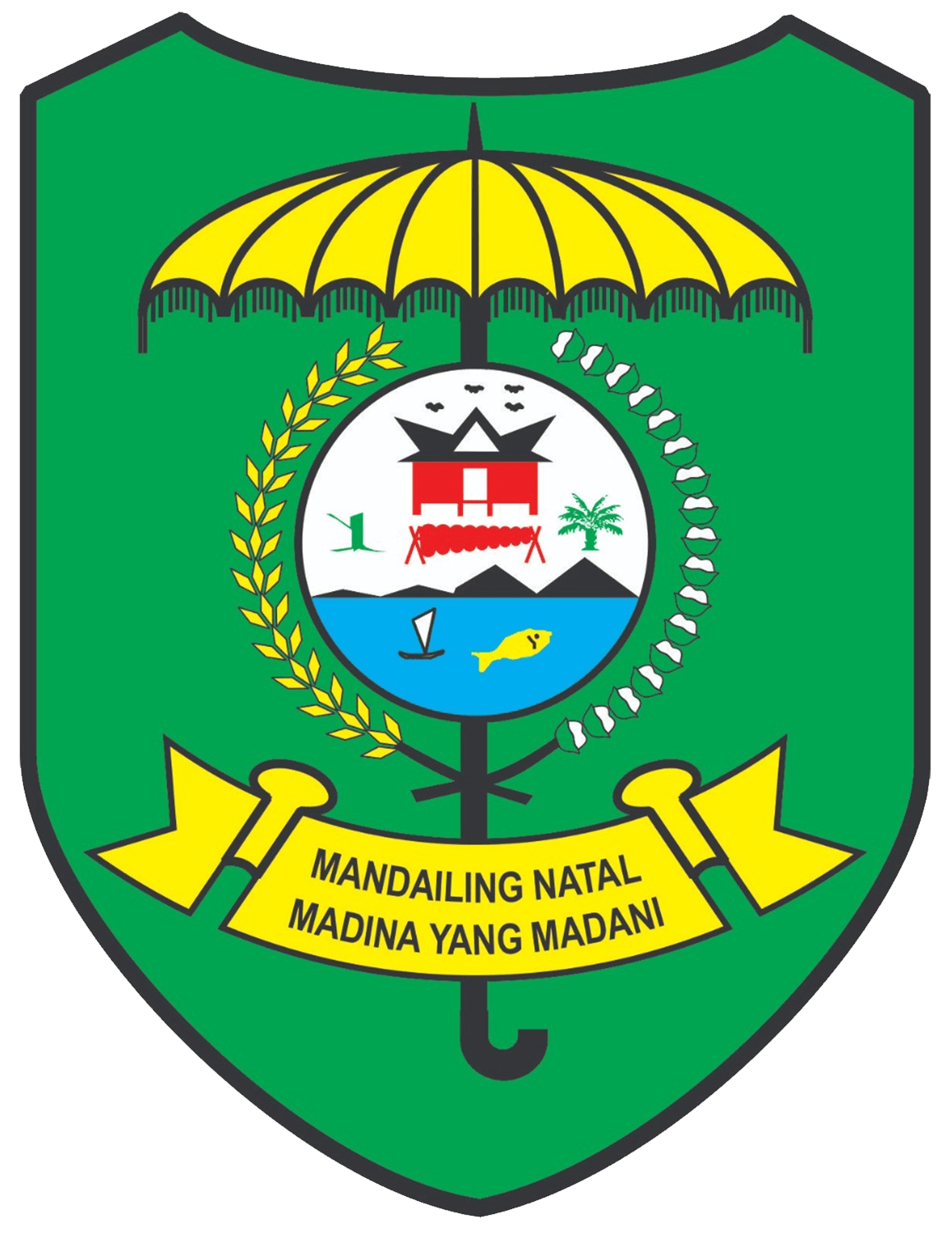
- Coat of arms
- Motto(s): Madina yang Madani ("A Civilized Regency")
- Country: Indonesia
- Province: North Sumatra
- Regency seat: Panyabungan

Government
  - Regent: Saipullah Nasution
  - Vice Regent: Atika Azmi Utammi
  - Chairman of Council of Representatives: Erwin Efendi Lubis (Gerindra)
  - Vice Chairmen of Council of Representatives: Harminsyah Batubara (Partai Demokrat) and Erwin Efendi Nasution (Golkar)

Area
  - Total: 6,620.7 km^{2} (2,556.3 sq mi)

Population (mid 2025 estimate)
  - Total: 513,536
  - Density: 77.565/km^{2} (200.89/sq mi)
- Time zone: UTC+7 (WIB)
- Website: www.madina.go.id

Mandailing Natal, a.k.a. Madina, is a regency in North Sumatra Province of Indonesia. It covers an area of 6,620.70 square kilometres and it had a population of 403,894 people at the 2010 census and 472,886 at the 2020 Census; the official estimate as of mid 2025 was 513,536. The capital lies at Panyabungan. The Regency was formerly a part of South Tapanuli Regency until it was created as a separate regency on 23 November 1998. It is the southernmost regency in North Sumatra, and the largest regency by land area in the province, with Langkat Regency second to it.

== Geography ==
The regency is divided in two by the Bukit Barisan mountains. The portion to the west of the mountains drains to the west coast of Sumatra, and comprises the districts of Batahan, Sinunukan, Batang Natal, Lingga Bayu, Ranto Baek, Natal and Muara Batang Gadis; it covers an area of 4,037 km^{2}, and had a population of 187,672 in mid 2025. The portion to the east of the mountains comprises the remaining districts of the Regency, all of which drain towards the north; it covers an area of 2,583.7 km^{2} and had a population of 325,864 in mid 2025.

== Administration ==
At the 2010 Census, the regency was divided into eighteen districts (kecamatan). Subsequently, five additional districts (indicated by asterisks in the table below) have been created by the division of existing districts. The twenty-three districts are tabulated below with their areas and their population at the 2010 Census and the 2020 Census, together with the official estimates as of mid 2025. The table also includes the locations of the district administrative centres, the number of administrative villages in each district (totaling 377 rural desa and 27 urban kelurahan), and its post code.

Kode Wilayah	Name of District (kecamatan)	Area in km^{2}	Pop'n Census 2010	Pop'n Census 2020	Pop'n Estimate mid 2025	Admin centre	No. of villages	Post code
12.13.15	Batahan	497.07	17,524	22,509	25,359	Pasar Batahan	18 ^{(a)}	22988
12.13.22	Sinunukan *	172.64	15,375	21,527	25,287	Sinunukan III	14	22986
12.13.13	Batang Natal	651.51	22,575	25,333	26,735	Muara Soma	31 ^{(a)}	22983
12.13.14	Lingga Bayu	192.68	22,453	27,576	30,401	Simpang Gambir	19 ^{(b)}	22982
12.13.18	Ranto Baek *	152.72	11,259	14,085	15,667	Manisak	17	22984
12.13.08	Kotanopan	325.15	26,264	27,871	28,629	Pasar Kotanopan	36 ^{(b)}	22994
12.13.11	Ulu Pungkut	295.19	4,250	4,674	4,886	Huta Godang	13 ^{(a)}	22999
12.13.10	Tambangan	158.60	11,471	10,913	10,915	Laru Lombang	20 ^{(a)}	22996
12.13.09	Lembah; Sorik Marapi	34.73	15,605	10,968	10,971	Pasar Maga	9 ^{(a)}	22993
12.13.20	Puncak; Sorik Marapi *	55.54	7,954	8,975	9,498	Sibanggor	11	22995
12.13.12	Muara Sipongi	135.70	9,670	12,528	14,173	Pasar; Muara Sipongi	16 ^{(a)}	22998
12.13.21	Pakantan *	93.60	2,146	2,222	2,255	Pakantan	8	22997
12.13.01	Panyabungan (Kota)	259.77	77,449	90,049	96,679	Panyabungan	39 ^{(c)}	22915 -22919
12.13.04	Panyabungan; Selatan (South; Panyabungan)	87.60	9,410	10,323	10,776	Tano Bato	11 ^{(a)}	22952
12.13.05	Panyabungan; Barat (West; Panyabungan)	87.22	8,911	10,677	11,631	Longat	10 ^{(a)}	22911
12.13.02	Panyabungan; Utara (North; Panyabungan)	63.73	19,991	22,573	23,894	Mompang	12 ^{(a)}	22979
12.13.03	Panyabungan; Timur (East; Panyabungan)	397.87	12,307	14,214	15,212	Gunung Baringin	15 ^{(a)}	22912
12.13.19	Huta Bargot *	116.21	5,715	8,748	10,729	Bangun Sejati	12	22978
12.13.16	Natal	935.37	27,292	33,897	37,573	Pasar Natal	30 ^{(b)}	22987
12.13.17	Muara; Batang Gadis	1,435.02	15,416	22,322	26,650	Singkuang	14	22989
12.13.06	Siabu	345.36	47,364	53,286	56,304	Siabu	28 ^{(b)}	22976
12.13.07	Bukit Malintang	68.74	10,894	12,771	13,766	Bukit Malintang	11	22977
12.13.23	Naga Juang *	58.69	3,650	4,845	5,546	Banua Simanosor	7	22975
	Totals	6,620.70	404,945	472,886	513,536	Panyabungan	404	

Notes: (a) including one kelurahan. (b) including two kelurahan. (c) comprising nine kelurahan (Dalan Lidang, Kayu Jati, Kota Siantar, Panyabungan I, Panyabungan II, Panyabungan III, Pasar Hilir, Pidoli Dolok and Sipolu-Polu) and thirty desa.

== National Park ==
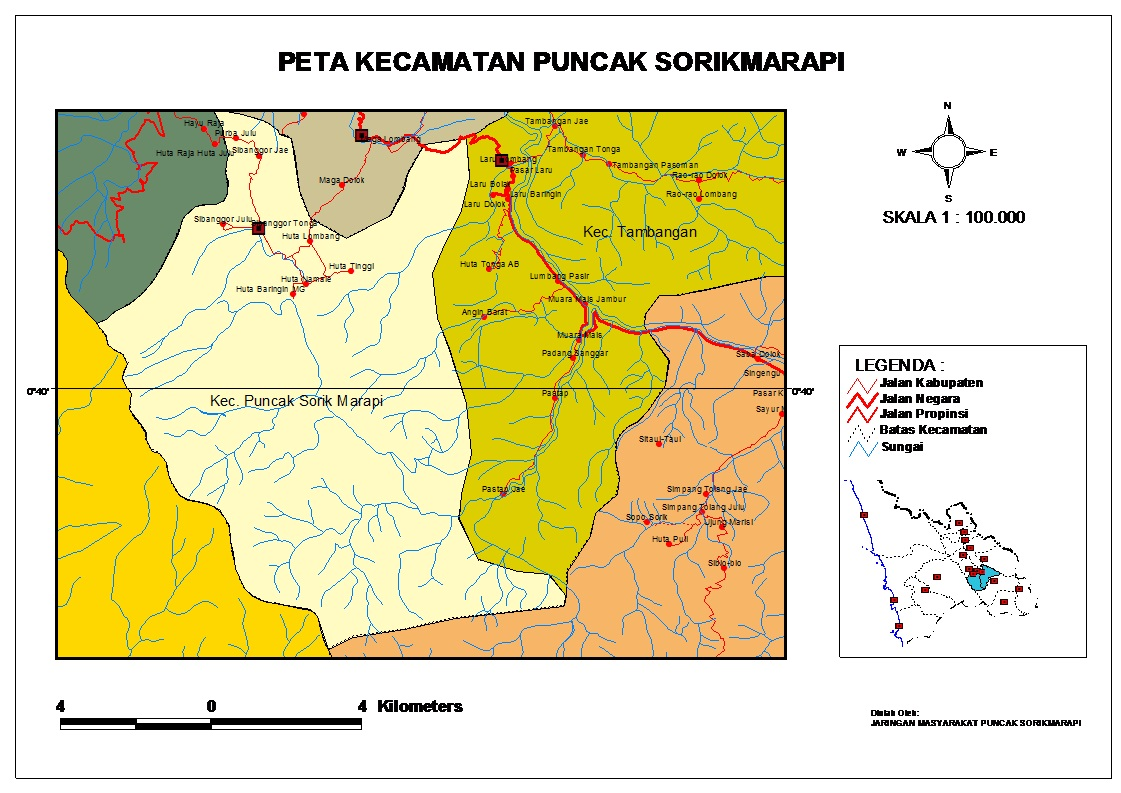
Sorik Marapi District Highland without Batang Gadis National Park

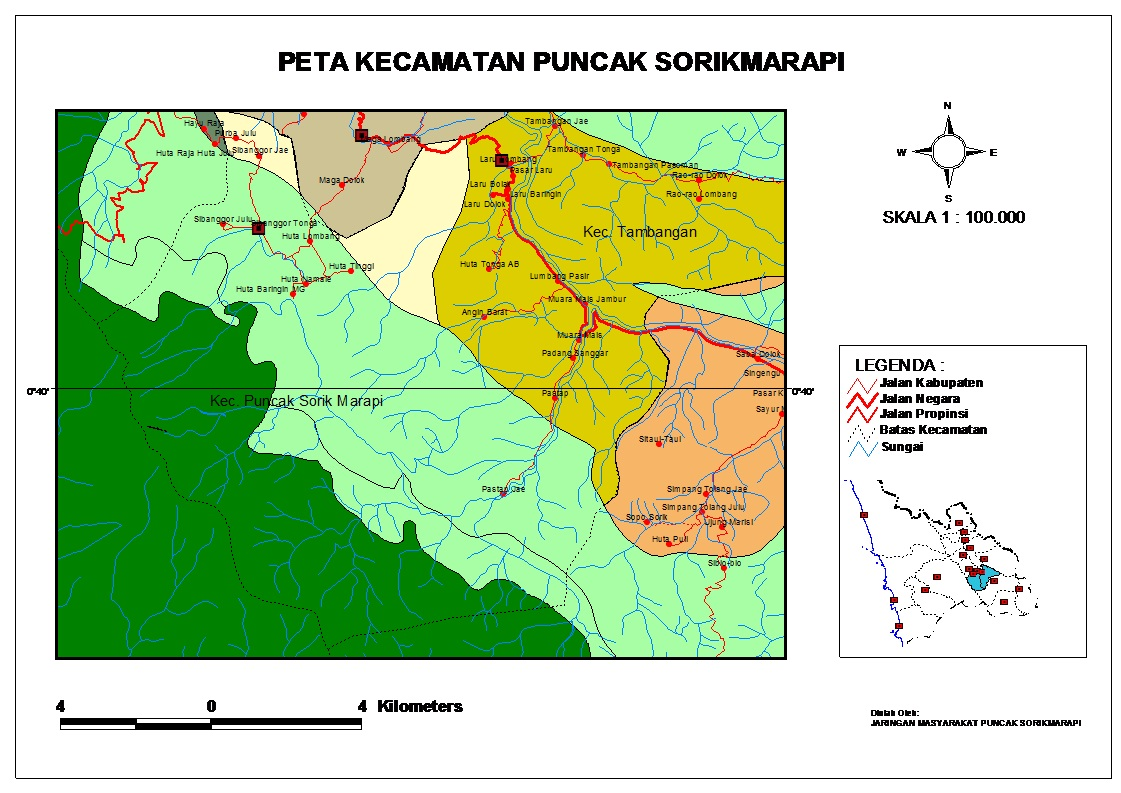
Sorik Marapi District Highland with Batang Gadis National Park

see Batang Gadis National Park
