= Agus Subiyanto =

Commander of the Indonesian National Armed Forces (born 1967)

General Agus Subiyanto
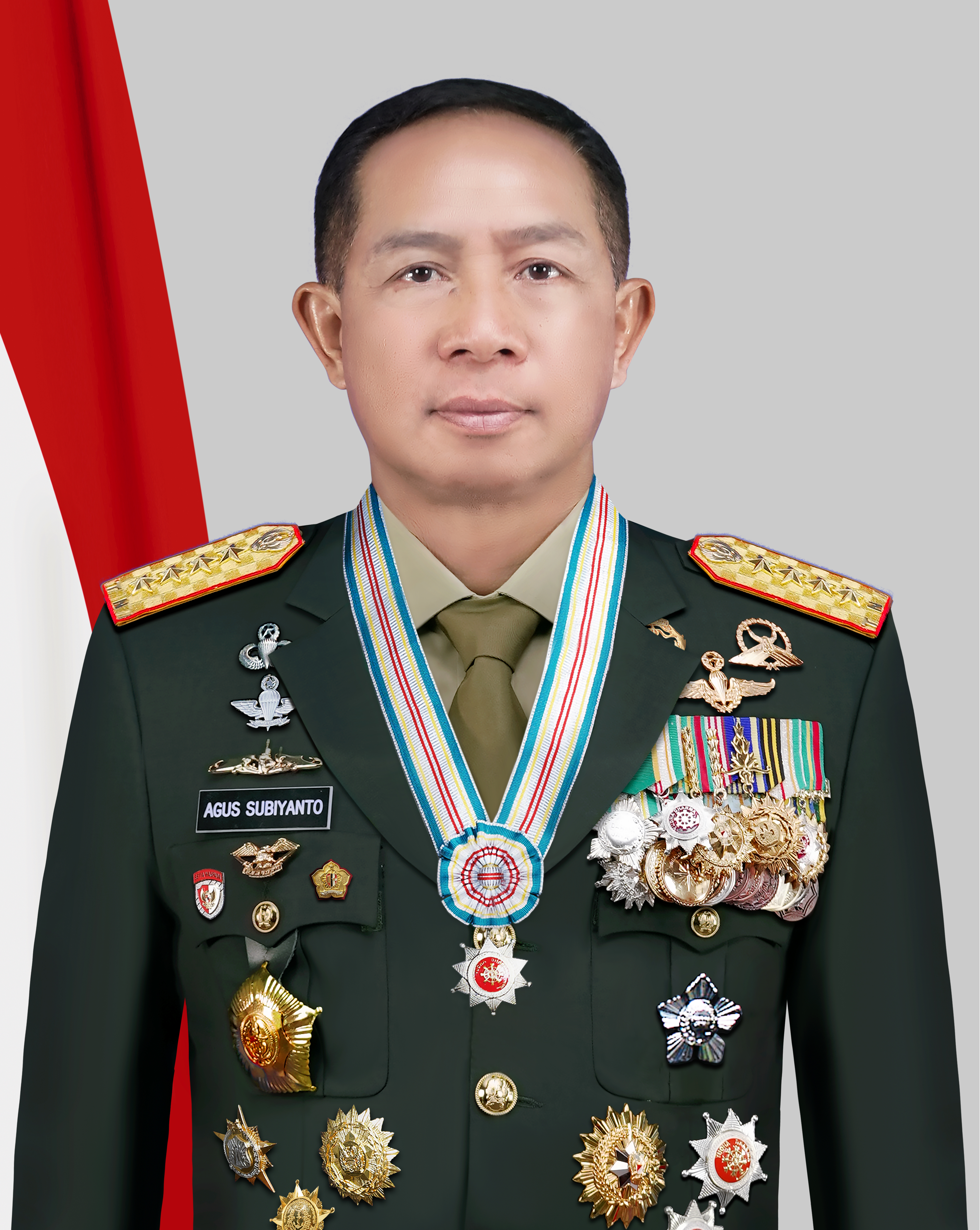
- Official portrait, 2023

Commander of the National Armed Forces
- Incumbent
- Assumed office 22 November 2023
- President: Joko Widodo; Prabowo Subianto (incumbent)
- Preceded by: Admiral Yudo Margono

Chief of Staff of the Army
- In office 25 October 2023 – 29 November 2023
- Preceded by: General Dudung Abdurachman
- Succeeded by: General Maruli Simanjuntak

Commander of Military District III/Siliwangi
- In office 2 August 2021 – 31 January 2022
- Preceded by: Major General Nugroho Budi Wiryanto
- Succeeded by: Major General Kunto Arief Wibowo

Personal details
- Born: 5 August 1967 (age 59) Cimahi, West Java, Indonesia
- Spouse: Evi Sophia Indira
- Education: Indonesian Military Academy
- Awards: See Awards

Military service
- Allegiance: Indonesia
- Branch/service: Indonesian Army
- Years of service: 1991–present
- Rank: General
- Commands: Commander of the Indonesian National Armed Forces; Chief of Staff of the Indonesian Army; Commander of the 3rd Military Regional Command; Commander of the Presidential Security Force
- Battles/wars: Invasion of East Timor; Papua Conflict

Agus Subiyanto (born 5 August 1967) is an Indonesian general who is currently serving as the 23rd and incumbent Commander of the Indonesian National Armed Forces. He was appointed by President of Indonesia Joko Widodo in November 2023, replacing the retiring Admiral Yudo Margono, and formerly served as the Chief of Staff of the Indonesian Army, Deputy Chief of Staff of the Army, and as commander of Kodam III/Siliwangi.

== Early life and education ==
Agus Subiyanto was born in Cimahi, West Java on 5 August 1967, and is the second child among six siblings. His father, Chief Sergeant Dedi Unadi, is an enlisted member of the Indonesian Army, where he served under Kodim 0618, and came from Cijulang, Pangandaran Regency, while his mother is Cicih Gunasih. His father also owned a rickshaw business known as "Putra Cijulang" and possesses 12 rickshaws that serve within Cijulang. When Agus was 5 years old, his mother left him, his younger brother and his father. The peak of the bitter period he went through occurred when he was in the second year of high school. At that time, his father, Dedi, died in a traffic accident in 1984. He had to continue living with his younger siblings and stepmother. In the aftermath of his father's sudden death, he lives on his father's pension money, while his older brother and one of his younger sibling were raised by her father's elder sister. Due to his small stature and exposure to malnutrition, Agus was later trained in martial arts and later earned the nickname "Jago Gelut" for his martial arts skills during teenage fights.

Agus graduated elementary school at SMP Negeri 2 Cimahi and eventually finished high school at State Senior High School 13 Bandung. Before his father's death, his father often expressed the hope that Agus would follow in his footsteps as a soldier, and later intensified his desires of joining the army after beaten by an army soldier as a punishment for not wearing his helmet on a public road. After high school in 1986, Agus Subiyanto took a test at the Kodam III/Siliwangi NCO Candidate School. As a result, he was declared not to have passed but was recommended to attend Officer Candidate School without a test. Not understanding what it meant, Agus decided to apply as a security guard at the Internusa Mall in Bogor, but was rejected.⁣ In 1988 Agus Subiyanto took the Indonesian Military Academy entrance test. This time it was successful and he graduated with the second highest honors in West Java and later graduated from the academy in 1991.

== Career ==
After his graduation from the military academy, Agus first served as a first officer under the Infantry Weapons Center (Pussenif) as an infantryman and later became a platoon commander. Shortly after being an infantryman, Agus later entered the Special Forces Training and Education Center (Pusdikpassus), where he completed the special forces course and the parachutist course and later became a qualified member of the Kopassus. Agus later made an encounter with the battalion commander, then-Lieutenant Colonel and future President Prabowo Subianto during his training with the Airborne Raider Infantry Battalion 328 of the 17th Airborne Raider Infantry Brigade. In 1995, Agus was deployed in East Timor during the Invasion of East Timor, where his unit boarded the KRI Teluk Amboina (503) bound for the Port of Dili and later served as a Head of Operations Sector A, and led military operations against the Fretilin. After his time in East Timor, Agus later entered the Special Forces Command Course at the Pusdikpassus and the Indonesian Army Advanced Officer School as part of his reward for his military accomplishments in East Timor, and later completed the military free-falling course and the military diving course.

Agus later served as battalion commander of Battalion 22 of the Group 2 of Kopassus and later served as the Chief of Intelligence of Kopassus. In 2009 to 2011, Agus later served as commander of the Kodim 0735/Surakarta under the Kodam IV/Diponegoro, and on 2011–2014, Agus served as the Deputy Operations Officer of Kostrad. On 2014 to 2015, Agus was named as the Assistant Commander for Operations under the Kodam I/Bukit Barisan, and later served as an assistant lecturer at the Indonesian Army Command and Staff College (Seskoad) in 2015. On 2015 to 2016, Agus served as a staff officer under the Army Headquarters Command (Pamen Denma Mabesad). Agus was later named as commander of the 2nd Regional Training Regiment of the Kodam II/Sriwijaya from 2016 to 2017, and later served as commander of the Korem 132/Tadulako from 2017 to 2018. Agus later served as the Senior Officer of the Army Headquarters from 2018–2019 and later became the Deputy Commander of the Military Education and Training Center of the Indonesian Military Academy from 2019 to 2020, and eventually became the Commander of the 061/Surya Kencana Military District in 2020.

Agus was later named as Commander of the Presidential Security Forces from 2020 to 2021, where he led security operations for former President Joko Widodo, and afterwards became Commander of Kodam III/Siliwangi from 2021 to 2022. Agus later became Vice Chief of Staff of the Indonesian Army, the army's second highest position, from 4 February 2022 to 17 November 2023. Agus' post was later elevated and he later served as the Chief of Staff of the Army for roughly 35 days from 25 October 2023 to 29 November 2023. 6 days after his assumption to the post as Army Chief, former President Widodo nominated Agus as the sole candidate to be named as the new Commander of the National Armed Forces on 31 October 2023, and was later approved by the People's Representative Council on the same day. Speaker Puan Maharani praised the House for their swift approval of Agus' nomination and hopes that the armed forces will demonstrate political neutrality for the 2024 Indonesian general election. Nearly a month after assuming the post as Chief of Staff of the Army, Agus was later named by former President Joko Widodo as the Commander of the National Armed Forces on 22 November 2023, where he replaced Admiral Yudo Margono, and utilizes his leadership thrust through the acronym "PRIMA", which stands for Professional, Responsive, Integrative, Modern and Adaptive. Agus also emphasized the need for the armed forces to modernize its training programs, fast track weapons and technology procurement, a merit based coaching system, and measures aimed to enhance the soldier's welfare. Critics of his appointment argue that Agus' promotion as the armed forces chief could be used to retain Widodo's political grip, while using his interim job as army chief as a prerequisite measure to hasten his appointment as the armed forces chief. Agus later pledged to strengthen cooperation with the police to ensure the election's security.

== Awards and decorations ==
General Agus has received the following awards:

Right Chest
Left Chest

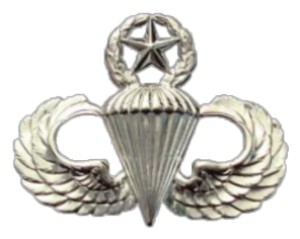
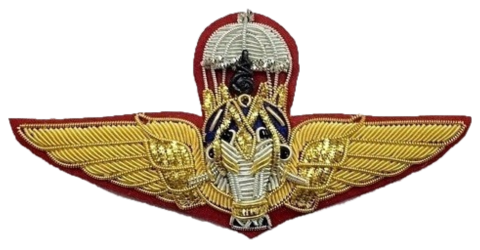
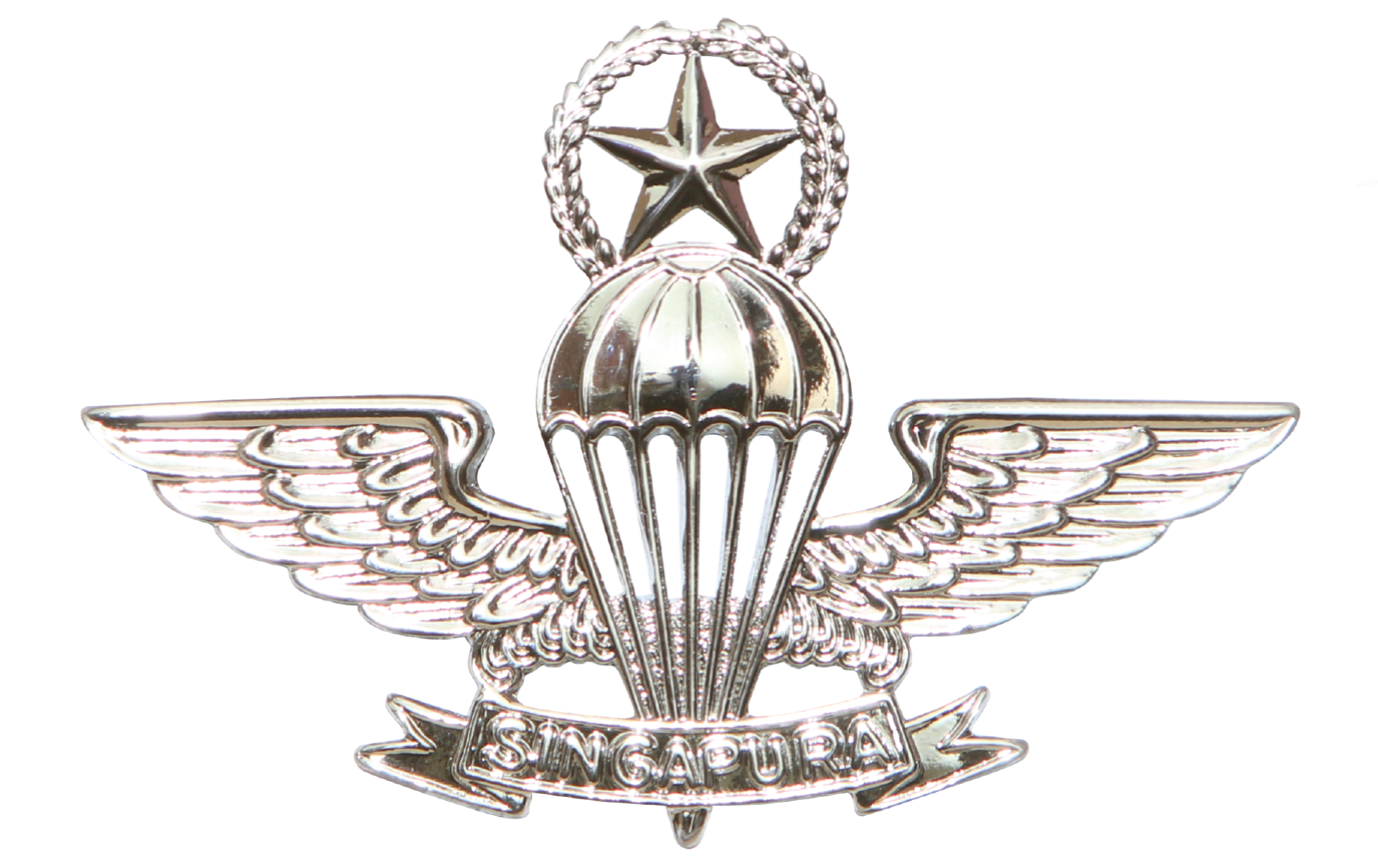
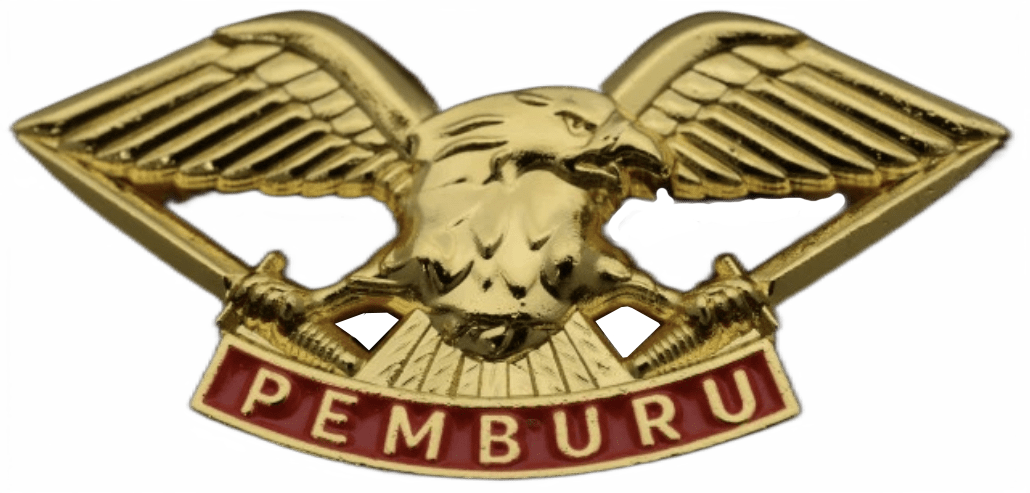

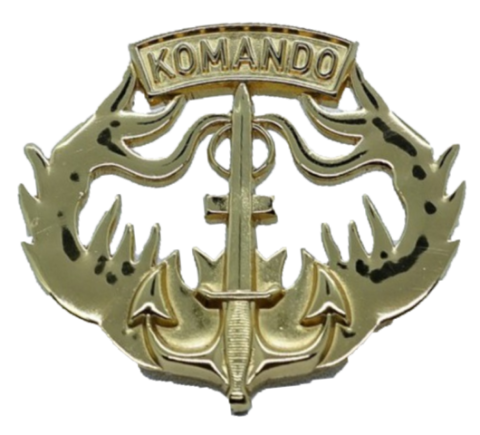
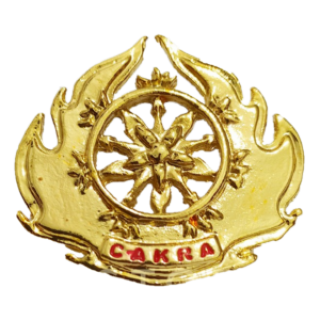
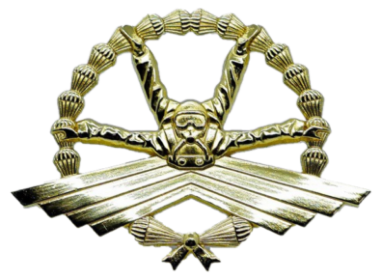
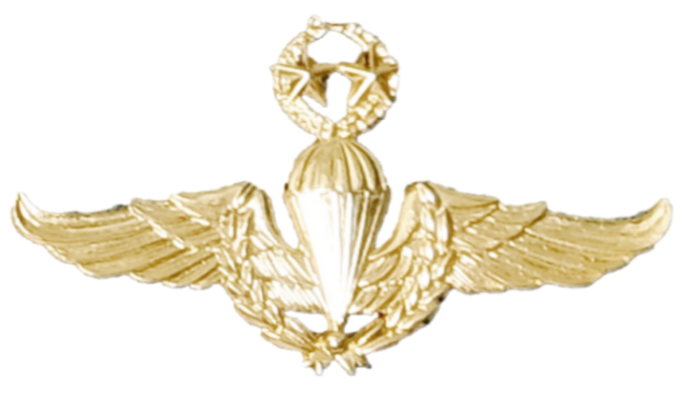
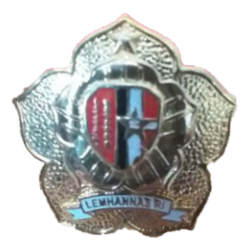
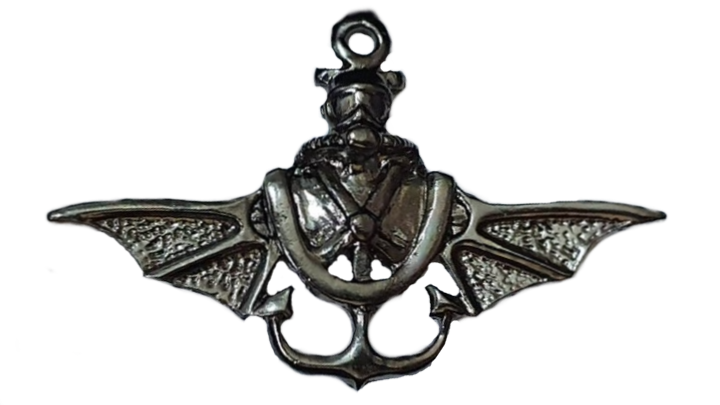
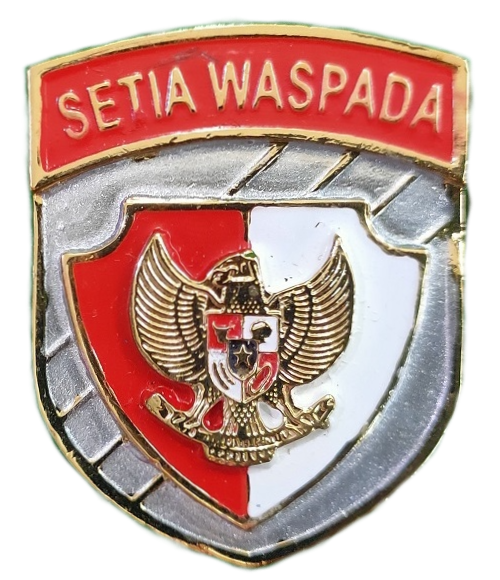

Master Parachutist Badge (U.S. Army)
Basic Parachutist Badge (Royal Thai Army)
Master Parachutist Badge (Singapore Army)	Brevet Pemburu

Brevet	Indonesian Army Special Forces "Commando" Badge			
Brevet	Indonesian Army Strategic Command "Chakra" Badge		Indonesian Army Free fall Badge	
Brevet	Indonesian Army Master Parachutist Badge			
Row 1	Bintang Dharma	Grand Meritorious Military Order Star (Bintang Yudha Dharma Utama)	Army Meritorious Service Star, 1st Class (Bintang Kartika Eka Paksi Utama)	Navy Meritorious Service Star, 1st Class (Bintang Jalasena Utama)
Row 2	Air Force Meritorious Service Star, 1st Class (Bintang Swa Bhuwana Paksa Utama)	National Police Meritorious Service Star, 1st Class (Bintang Bhayangkara Utama) (2024)	Grand Meritorious Military Order Star, 2nd Class (Bintang Yudha Dharma Pratama)	Army Meritorious Service Star, 2nd Class (Bintang Kartika Eka Paksi Pratama)
Row 3	Grand Meritorious Military Order Star, 3rd Class (Bintang Yudha Dharma Nararya)	Army Meritorious Service Star (Bintang Kartika Eka Paksi Nararya)	Pingat Jasa Gemilang - Tentera (P.J.G.) - Singapore (2024)	Courageous Commander of the Most Gallant Order of Military Service (Pingat Panglima Gagah Angkatan Tentera) - Malaysia (2025)
Row 4	Darjah Utama Bakti Cemerlang (Tentera) (D.U.B.C.) - Singapore (2026)	Armed Forces Long Service Medal (Satyalancana Kesetiaan) 32 Years	Medal for Active Duty in the Army (Satyalancana Dharma Bantala)	Armed Forces Long Service Medal (Satyalancana Kesetiaan) 24 Years
Row 5	Armed Forces Long Service Medal (Satyalancana Kesetiaan) 16 Years	Armed Forces Long Service Medal (Satyalancana Kesetiaan) 8 Year	Armed Forces Service Medal for Raksaka Dharma Unit (Satyalancana Gerakan Operasi Militer IX/Satyalancana Raksaka Dharma) (Operation Trikora)	Medal for Active Duty in the Army (Satyalancana Dharma Nusa)
Row 6	Medal for 32 Years of Police Service (Satyalancana Bhakti Nusa)	Medal for Active Duty as a Border Guard (Satyalancana Wira Nusa)	Medal for Presidential and Vice Presidential Guards Personnel (Satyalancana Wira Dharma)	Military Special Forces Service Medal (Satyalancana Wira Siaga)
Row 7	Satyalancana Ksatria Yudha	Timor Military Campaign Medal (Satyalancana Seroja) (with one campaign star)	Medal for Service as a Military Educator (Satyalancana Dwidya Sistha)	Medal for Service in the Field of Social Welfare (Satyalancana Kebhaktian Sosial)
Brevet	National Resilience Institute Lemhannas Alumni Pin		Kopassus Diving Badge	
Brevet	Presidential Security Force of Indonesia Badge			

Honorary Badges
Airborne Tab (U.S. Army)
Mobile Brigade Corps Badge (16 November 2023)
Golden Shark Submarine Brevet (2 March 2024)
Army Military Police Corps Badge(2024)
Indonesian Air Force Pilot Badge Class I (2025)

== Personal life ==
Agus is married to Evi Sophia Indira and they have three children. During his free time, Agus is a known bass player and once joined the army's music detachment and later became part of a band with Piek Budyakto as their keyboard player, M. Naudi Nurdika as their drummer, Hari Jayadi as their guitarist, and Teddy Mulyana as their lead vocalist. Agus is also known on being a songwriter and released his song "Cinta Sejati Takkan Mati" featuring the band Pasha Ungu and was released on 25 July 2025. On his Instagram post during the aftermath of the awarding of the Army Meritorious Service Star, 1st Class, which coincided with the 46th birthday of former Singapore Army Chief David Neo on 17 September 2023, Agus was seen playing the bass and accompanying Major General Neo in the vocals, while having the Chief of Staff of the Army General Dudung Abdurachman as their drummer.

Agus is also a known gardener and farmer, a hobby that he inherited from his grandparents' farm in Cijulang, and occasionally contributes to his grandparents' farm on his freetime.

Military offices
Preceded by Yudo Margono	Commander of the Indonesian National Armed Forces; 22 November 2023 – present	Incumbent
Preceded by Dudung Abdurachman	Chief of Staff of the Indonesian Army; 25 October 2023 – 29 November 2023	Succeeded by Maruli Simanjuntak
Preceded by Bakti Agus Fadjari	Vice Chief of Staff of the Indonesian Army; 4 February 2022 – 17 November 2023	Succeeded by Arif Rahman
Preceded by Nugroho Budi Wiryanto	Commander of Military District III/Siliwangi; 2 August 2021 – 31 January 2022	Succeeded by Kunto Arief Wibowo
