= Deputy Commander of the Indonesian National Armed Forces =

High position in the Indonesian National Armed Forces

- Wakil Panglima Tentara Nasional Indonesia
- Insignia of the Armed Forces

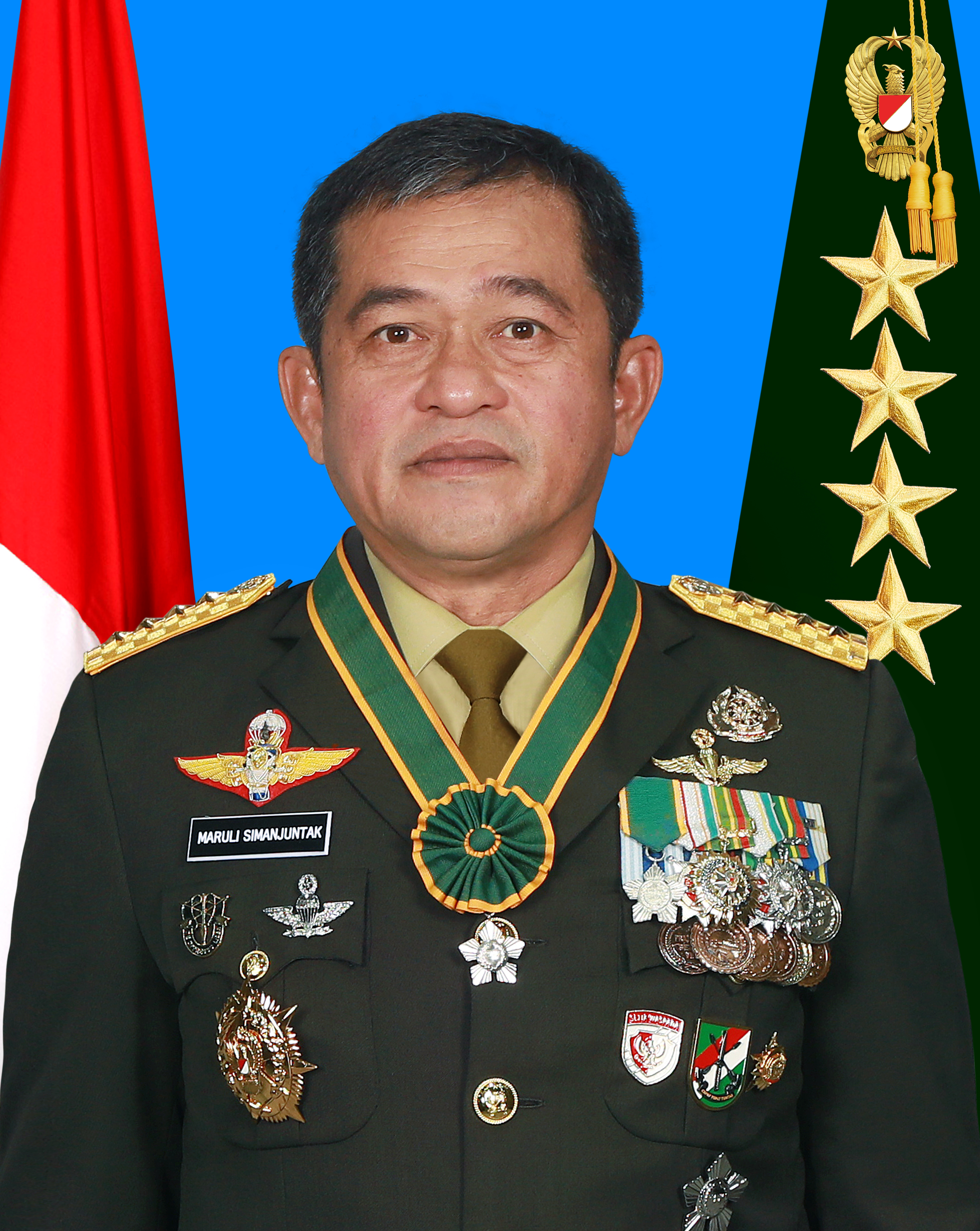
- Incumbent; General Maruli Simanjuntak since 15 October 2026
- Indonesian National Armed Forces
- Style: Wakil Panglima
- Reports to: President of Indonesia
- Seat: Indonesian Armed Forces Headquarters, Cilangkap, Jakarta
- Nominator: President of Indonesia
- Appointer: President of Indonesia with legislature (DPR) approval
- Formation: 1948; 78 years ago
- First holder: Colonel Abdul Haris Nasution

Deputy Commander of the Indonesian National Armed Forces (Indonesian: Wakil Panglima Tentara Nasional Indonesia or Wakil Panglima TNI) is the second highest position in the Indonesian National Armed Forces. The position is held by the four-star General/Admiral/Air Marshal as part of the leadership element, together with the Commander of the Indonesian National Armed Forces. As per President's decree Number 66 2019, a Wakil Panglima TNI is the coordinator of armed forces power consolidation to achieve inter-service operability. In performing his/her duty, Wakil Panglima reports to Panglima TNI.

== Duty ==
Duties of a Deputy Commander of the Indonesian National Armed Forces are:

- assist Commander of the National Armed Forces' daily operational duties
- provide advisory to Commander of the National Armed Forces regarding the national defense policy implementation, armed forces structure development, armed forces doctrine development, military strategy and armed forces power consolidation as well as the armed forces exercise of power
- perform Commander of the National Armed Forces' duties in his/her lieu
- perform other duties demanded by Commander of the National Armed Forces

== List of deputy commanders ==
No.	Portrait	Name (Birth–Death)	Term of office			Defence branch	Ref.
No.	Portrait	Name (Birth–Death)	Took office	Left office	Time in office	Defence branch	Ref.
1	Abdul Haris Nasution	Colonel; Abdul Haris Nasution (1918–2000)	17 February 1948	1953 †	5 years, 0 days	Army	
2	Maraden Panggabean	General; Maraden Panggabean (1922–2000) also as Minister of Defense and Security	9 September 1971	28 March 1973 †	1 year, 200 days	Army	
3	Sumitro	General; Sumitro (1927–1998) as Commander of Kopkamtib	4 April 1973	2 Maret 1974 †	332 days	Army	
4	Surono Reksodimedjo	General; Surono Reksodimedjo (1923–2010)	2 March 1974	17 April 1978 †	4 years, 1 month	Army	
5	Sudomo	Admiral; Sudomo (1926–2012) as Commander of Kopkamtib	17 April 1978	29 Maret 1983 †	4 years, 11 months	Navy	
6	Widodo AS	Admiral; Widodo AS (1944–2026)	17 July 1999	26 October 1999	3 months	Navy	
7	Fachrul Razi	General; Fachrul Razi (born 1947)	26 Oktober 1999	20 September 2000	10 months	Army	
8	Tandyo Budi Revita	General; Tandyo Budi Revita (born 1969)	10 August 2025	15 October 2026	1 year, 2 months	Army	
9	Maruli Simanjuntak	General; Maruli Simanjuntak (born 1970)	15 October 2026	Incumbent	29 days	Army	

== See also ==
- Commander of the Indonesian National Armed Forces
- Chief of Staff of the Indonesian Army
- Chief of Staff of the Indonesian Navy
- Chief of Staff of the Indonesian Air Force
- Chief of the Indonesian National Police
