= Maruli Simanjuntak =

Indonesian general (born 1970)

General Maruli Simanjuntak
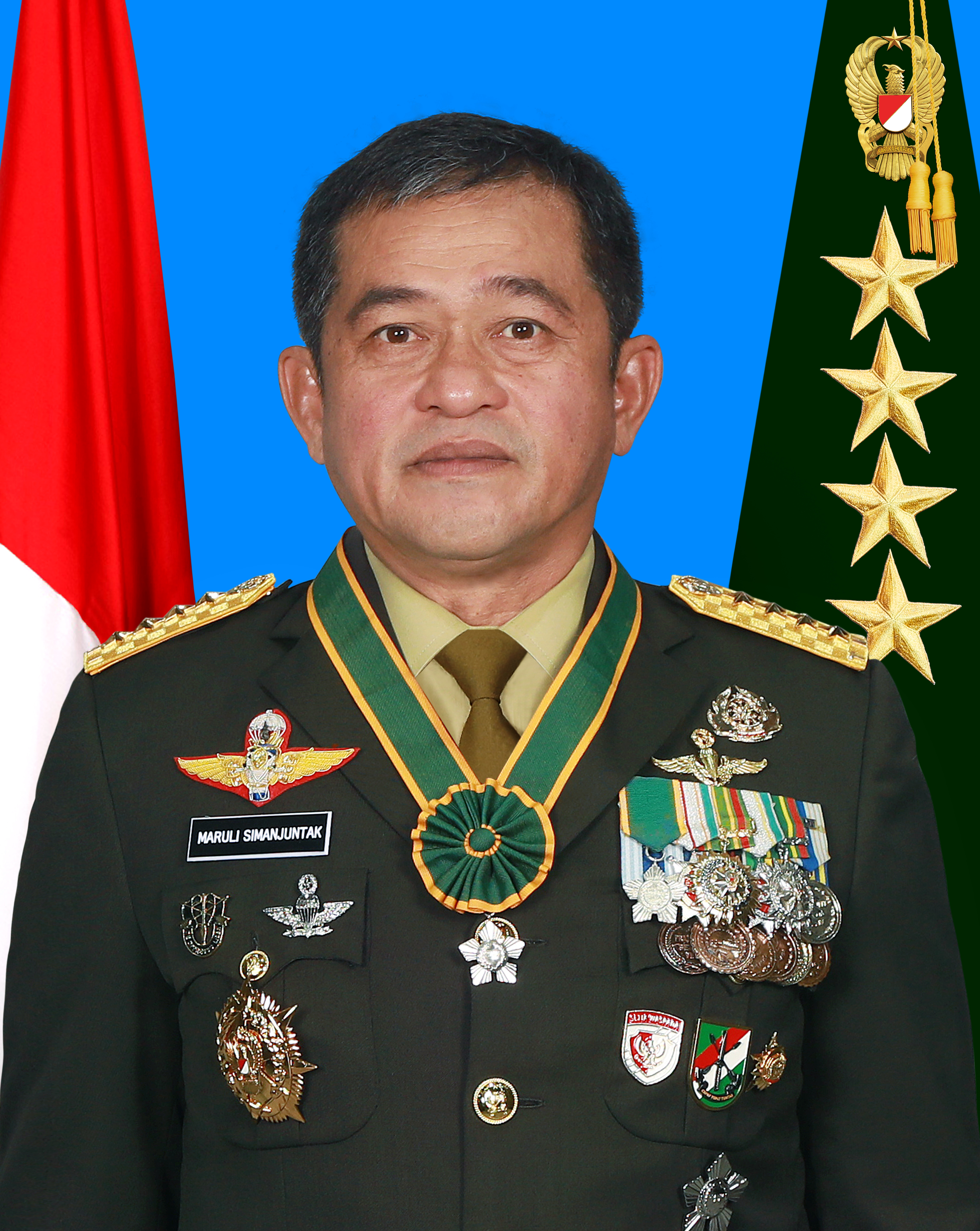

9th Deputy Commander of the Indonesian National Armed Forces
- Incumbent
- Assumed office 15 October 2026
- President: Prabowo Subianto
- Commander: Agus Subiyanto
- Preceded by: Tandyo Budi Revita

35th Chief of Staff of the Indonesian Army
- In office 29 November 2023 – 15 October 2026
- President: Joko Widodo
- Preceded by: Agus Subiyanto
- Succeeded by: Tandyo Budi Revita

43rd Commander of Army Strategic Reserve Command
- In office 31 January 2022 – 7 December 2023
- Preceded by: Dudung Abdurachman
- Succeeded by: Muhammad Saleh Mustafa

Commander of Kodam IX/Udayana
- In office 18 November 2020 – 31 January 2022
- Preceded by: Kurnia Dewantara
- Succeeded by: Sonny Aprianto

Commander of Presidential Security Force
- In office 29 November 2018 – 18 November 2020
- Preceded by: Suhartono
- Succeeded by: Agus Subiyanto

Commander of Kodam IV/Diponegoro
- In office 24 September 2018 – 29 November 2018
- Preceded by: Bakti Agus Fadjari
- Succeeded by: Teguh Muji Angkasa

Deputy Commander of Paspampres
- In office 25 April 2017 – 24 September 2018
- Preceded by: Teguh Arief Indratmoko
- Succeeded by: Deny Muis

Personal details
- Born: 24 February 1970 (age 56) Bandung, West Java, Indonesia
- Education: Indonesian Military Academy (1992)

Military service
- Allegiance: Indonesia
- Branch/service: Indonesian army
- Years of service: 1992–present
- Rank: General
- Unit: Infantry (Kopassus)
- Battles/wars: Operation Lotus; Papua conflict

General Maruli Simanjuntak (born 24 February 1970), is an officer of the Indonesian Army who has served as Deputy Commander of the Indonesian National Armed Forces since 15 October 2026. Previously, he served as the Chief of Staff of the Indonesian Army from November 2023 to October 2026.

Maruli is a graduate of the Military Academy in 1992 from the infantry branch (Kopassus) and the Cakra Combat Detachment. He also served as the Commander of Army Strategic Reserve Command (Kostrad).

== Awards and decorations ==
Right breast
Left breast

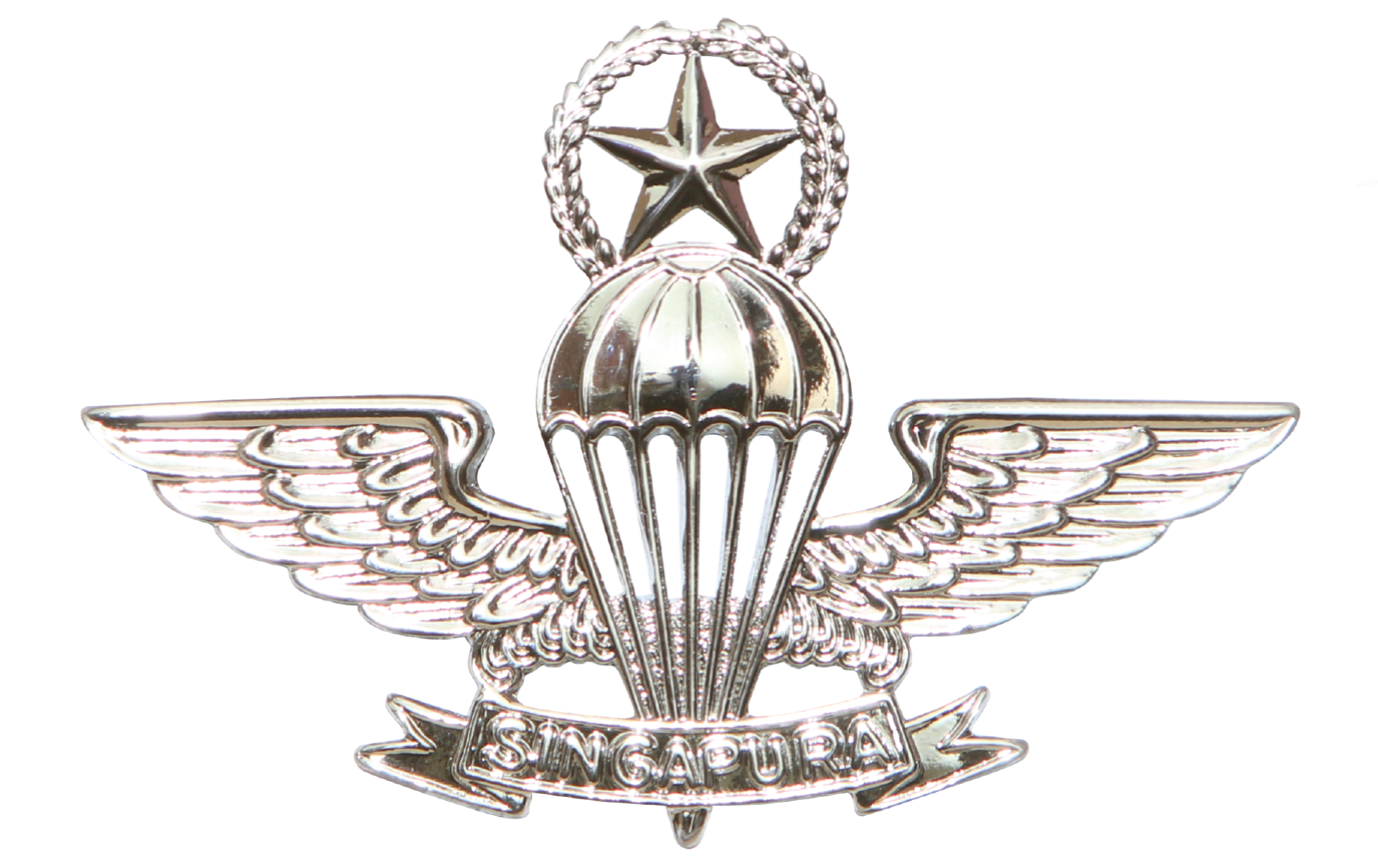
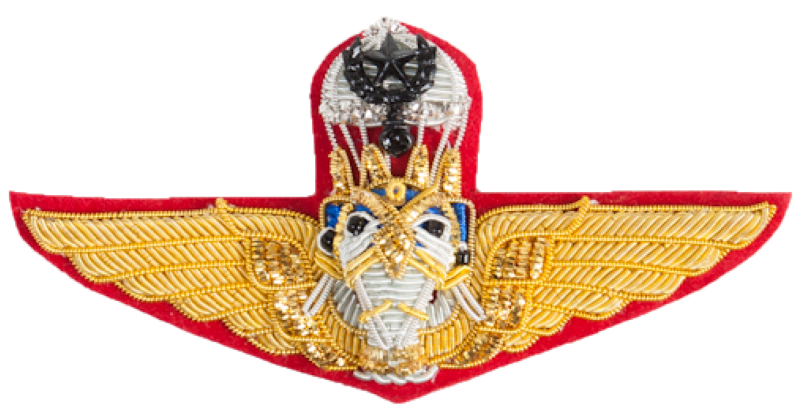
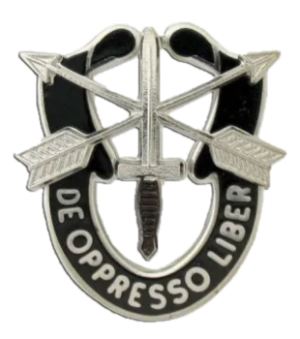
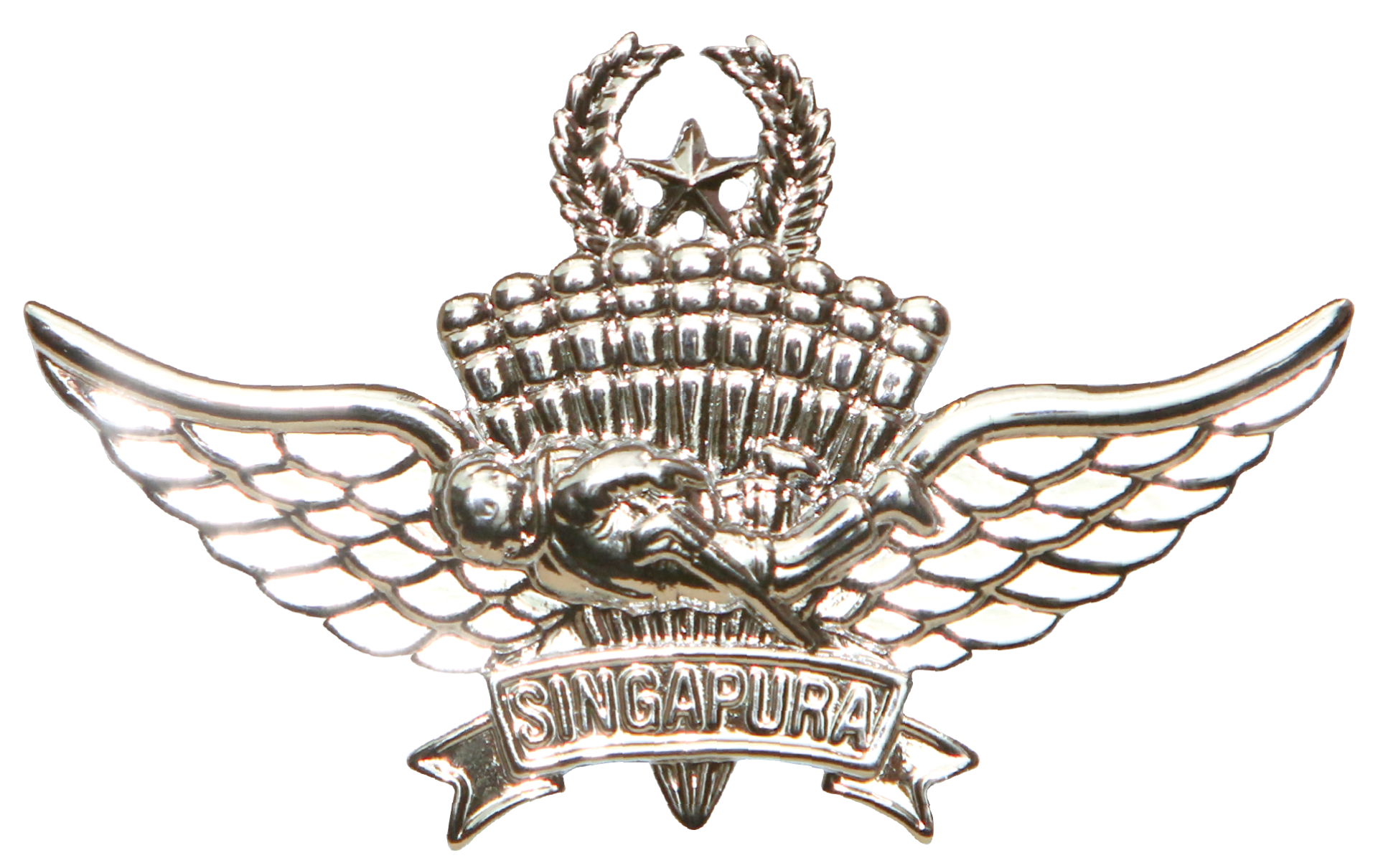

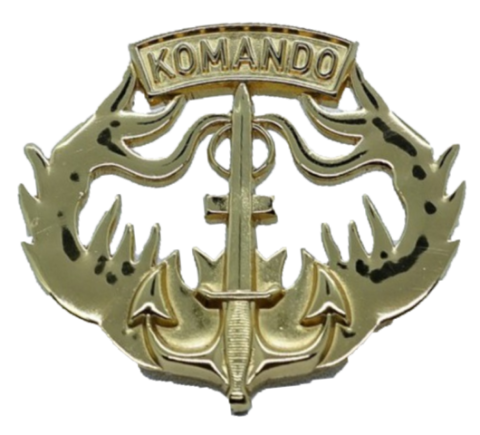
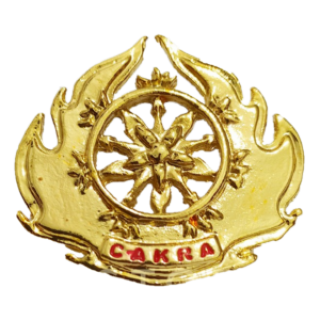
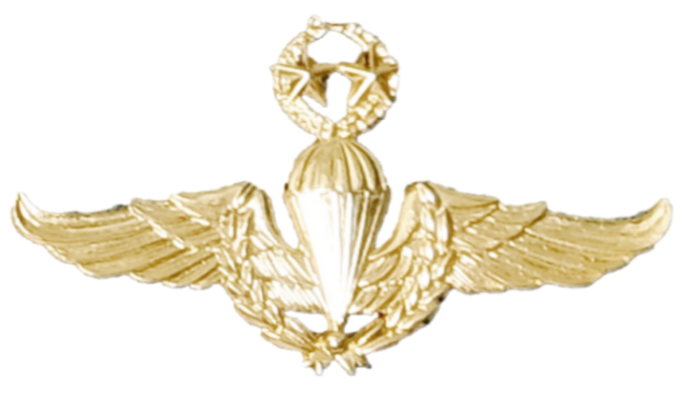
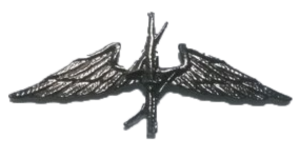
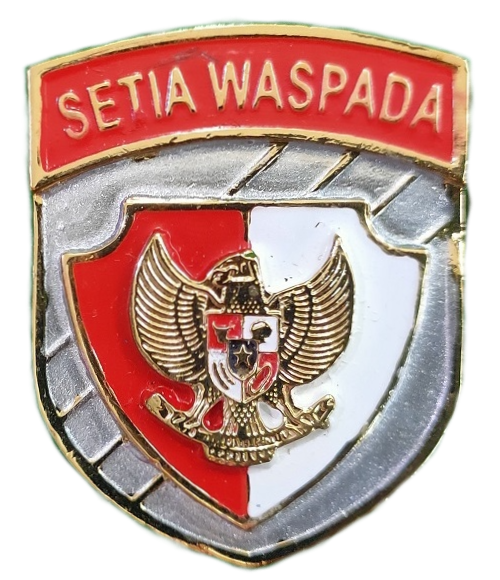
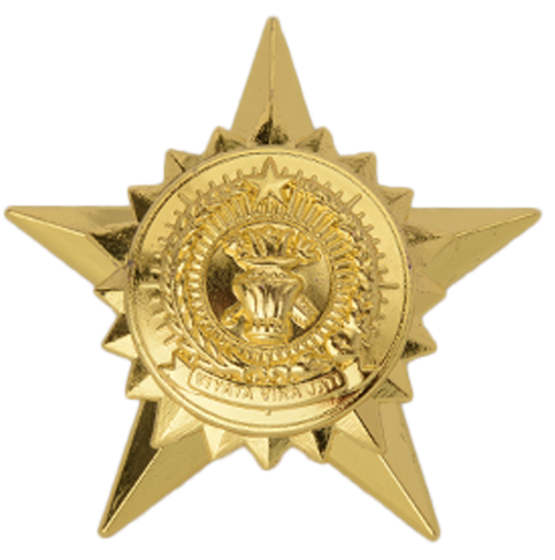
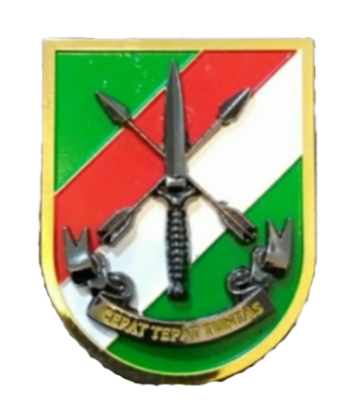

Master Parachutist Badge (Singapore Army)
Master Parachutist Badge (Royal Thai Army)
Special Forces Distinctive Unit Insignia (US Army)	Advanced Military Free Fall Parachutist Badge (Singapore Army)

Badges	Indonesian Army Special Forces Command "Commando" badge		Indonesian Army Strategic Reserve Command "Chakra" badge
Badges	Indonesian Army Master Parachutist badge		
1st row	Military Distinguished Service Star (Bintang Dharma) (2023)		
2nd row	Army Meritorious Service Star, 1st Class (Bintang Kartika Eka Pakçi Utama)	Navy Meritorious Service Star, 1st Class (Bintang Jalasena Utama)	Air Force Meritorious Service Star, 1st Class (Bintang Swa Bhuwana Pakça Utama)
3rd row	National Police Meritorious Service Star, 1st Class (Bintang Bhayangkara Utama) (2024)	Grand Meritorious Military Order Star, 2nd Class (Bintang Yudha Dharma Pratama)	Army Meritorious Service Star, 2nd Class (Bintang Kartika Eka Paksi Pratama)
4th row	Grand Meritorious Military Order Star, 3rd Class (Bintang Yudha Dharma Nararya)	Army Meritorious Service Star, 3rd Class (Bintang Kartika Eka Paksi Nararya)	Meritorious Service Medal (Military) Pingat Jasa Gemilang - Tentera (P.J.G.) - Singapore (2025)
5th row	Medal for 32 Years Service in the Military (Satyalancana Kesetiaan 32 tahun)	Medal for Active Duty in the Army (Satyalancana Dharma Bantala)	Medal for 24 Years Service in the Military (Satyalancana Kesetiaan 24 tahun)
6th row	Medal for 16 Years Service in the Military (Satyalancana Kesetiaan 16 tahun)	Medal for 8 Years Service in the Military (Satyalancana Kesetiaan 8 tahun)	Military Operations IX Medal (Satyalancana G.O.M IX Raksaka Dharma)
7th row	Medal for National Defense Service (Satyalancana Dharma Nusa)	Medal for Active Duty in Indonesia's Outer Islands (Satyalancana Wira Nusa)	Medal for Active Duty as a Border Guard (Satyalancana Wira Dharma)
8th row	Medal for Presidential and Vice Presidential Guards Personnel (Satyalancana Wira Siaga)	Military Special Forces Service Medal (Satyalancana Ksatria Yudha)	East Timor Military Campaign medal (Satyalancana Seroja)
Badges	Indonesian Army Counter-terrorism bagde (2024)		
Badges	Presidential Security Force of Indonesia (Setia Waspada) badge		Indonesian Army Command and General Staff College (Seskoad) badge
Badges	Indonesian Army Combat Reconnaissance badge		

Honorary badges
Indonesian Army Astros badge (2022)
Indonesian Army Aviation 1st Class Pilot badge (2023)
Indonesian Navy "Golden Shark" (Hiu Kencana) badge (2024)
Indonesian Air Force 1st Class Pilot badge (2025)

Military offices
Preceded by Tandyo Budi Revita	Deputy Commander of the Indonesian National Armed Forces; 15 October 2026 – present	Incumbent
Preceded by Agus Subiyanto	Chief of Staff of the Indonesian Army; 29 November 2023 – 15 October 2026	Succeeded by Tandyo Budi Revita
Preceded by Dudung Abdurachman	Commander of Army Strategic Reserve Command; 31 January 2022 – 7 December 2023	Succeeded by Muhammad Saleh Mustafa
