= Satgas Pomad Para =

Indonesian presidential bodyguard unit (1966-1976)

Para-Military Police Task Force
- Satgas Pomad Para
- Active: March 25, 1966–January 13, 1976
- Country: Indonesia
- Branch: Army, Navy, Air Force, Police
- Type: Protective security unit
- Role: Protection and escort towards the President, and Vice President including their family, their offices and official residences, and VVIP protection.
- Size: 2 Battalions (Eventually only 1 remaining active)
- Part of: Indonesian Army (TNI-AD) (Until June 10, 1967); Indonesian National Armed Forces (TNI) (After June 10, 1967)
- Garrison/HQ: Jakarta
- Beret colour: Blue

Commanders
- Notable commanders: Lieutenant Colonel (CPM) Norman Sasono; Colonel (CPM) Darsa Soemamihardja

The Satgas Pomad Para (Indonesian: "Satuan Tugas Polisi Militer Angkatan Darat Para", English: "Para-Military Police Task Force") was the presidential bodyguard unit established by former Indonesian President Soeharto. This task force of military policemen and paratroopers replaced the Tjakrabirawa Regiment after the failed 1965 coup. This task force was liquidated in 1976 and is one of the predecessors of the present day Paspampres.

== History ==
In accordance with Decree PRIN.75/III/1966 dated March 23, 1966 from the office of the Minister/Commander of the Army, Provost Marshal of Military Police Brigadier General (TNI) Sudirgo was appointed to take responsibility for head of state protection. Soon after the transfer, the provost marshal issued Decree Kep-011/AIII/1966 dated March 25, 1966, which formally established the Satuan Tugas Polisi Militer Angkatan Darat (Satgas POMAD) under the Military Police Command, and appointed Lieutenant Colonel (CPM) Norman Sasono as its commandant.

The Satgas Pomad Para task force operated under the office of the Provost Marshal of Military Police. It consisted of 2 Batalyon Pomad Para (English: Pomad Para Battalions) each as the core units, supported by the Denkav Serbu, 1st Capital Combat Engineers Detachment and the Presidential Band from Kodam V/Jakarta Raya (Army), the Indonesian Air Force's 2nd Battalion, PGT (Pasukan Gerak Tjepat) (English: Rapid Action Force), the Indonesian National Police's Mobile Brigade (BRIMOB), and also from the Army, the 531st Infantry Battalion/Para Raiders which later was replaced with the 519th Infantry Battalion/Para Raiders from Kodam VIII/Brawijaya.

The 1st Pomad Para Battalion was located at Jalan Tanah Abang II Central Jakarta, at the former barracks of the Tjakrabirawa Regiment. The 1st Battalion was assigned for protecting and escorting the President and Vice President and their families, and high-ranked foreign head of state-level guests, and guarding Merdeka Utara Palace, Merdeka Selatan Palace, and the President and Vice President's official residences. It provided guards of honor in state occasions of the Republic.

The 2nd Pomad Para Battalion was located at Ciluer, Bogor, was assigned for guarding Bogor Palace, Cipanas Palace, and as a force multiplier to assist in the functions of the 1st Battalion.

Eventually, Kodam V Jaya's Assault Cavalry Squadron was assigned to the task force as the armored element, while the 531st Infantry Battalion was later reassigned to Kodam VIII/Brawijaya. In accordance with the development of the Indonesian Army, the 2nd Pomad Para Battalion was dissolved, leaving the 1st Battalion in active service.

On June 10, 1967, General (TNI) Soeharto issued Decree No. KEP-681/VI/1967, transferring control of the task force to the Minister/Commander of the Army from the provost marshal.

The task force was replaced by the Paswalpres effective January 13, 1976 by the Ministry of Defence and Security thru Decree No. Sprin/54/I/1976.

== Organization ==
The Satgas Pomad Para organization consist of:

- 1st Pomad Para Battalion
- 2nd Pomad Para Battalion
