= Paspampres Presidential Band =

Indonesian military band

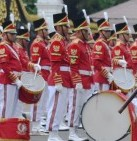
The band in September 2016.

The Presidential Band of the Presidential Security Forces of the Republic of Indonesia (Indonesian: Korps Musik Upacara Pasukan Pengamanan Presiden Republik Indonesia), also known commonly in public as the Paspampres Presidential Band, is the foremost military band of the Indonesian National Armed Forces which serves as the military band service of the President of Indonesia, the Vice President of Indonesia, and their families. As part of the Paspampres, it is affiliated to and leads all military bands within the INAF as the country's seniormost military band.

The band is attached to Group A of Paspampres stationed at Merdeka Palace and/or Bogor Palace, which serves the President and his First Family and is composed of military musicians from bands within the INAF (from 1962 until 1999 including the Indonesian National Police).

== Brief history and activities ==
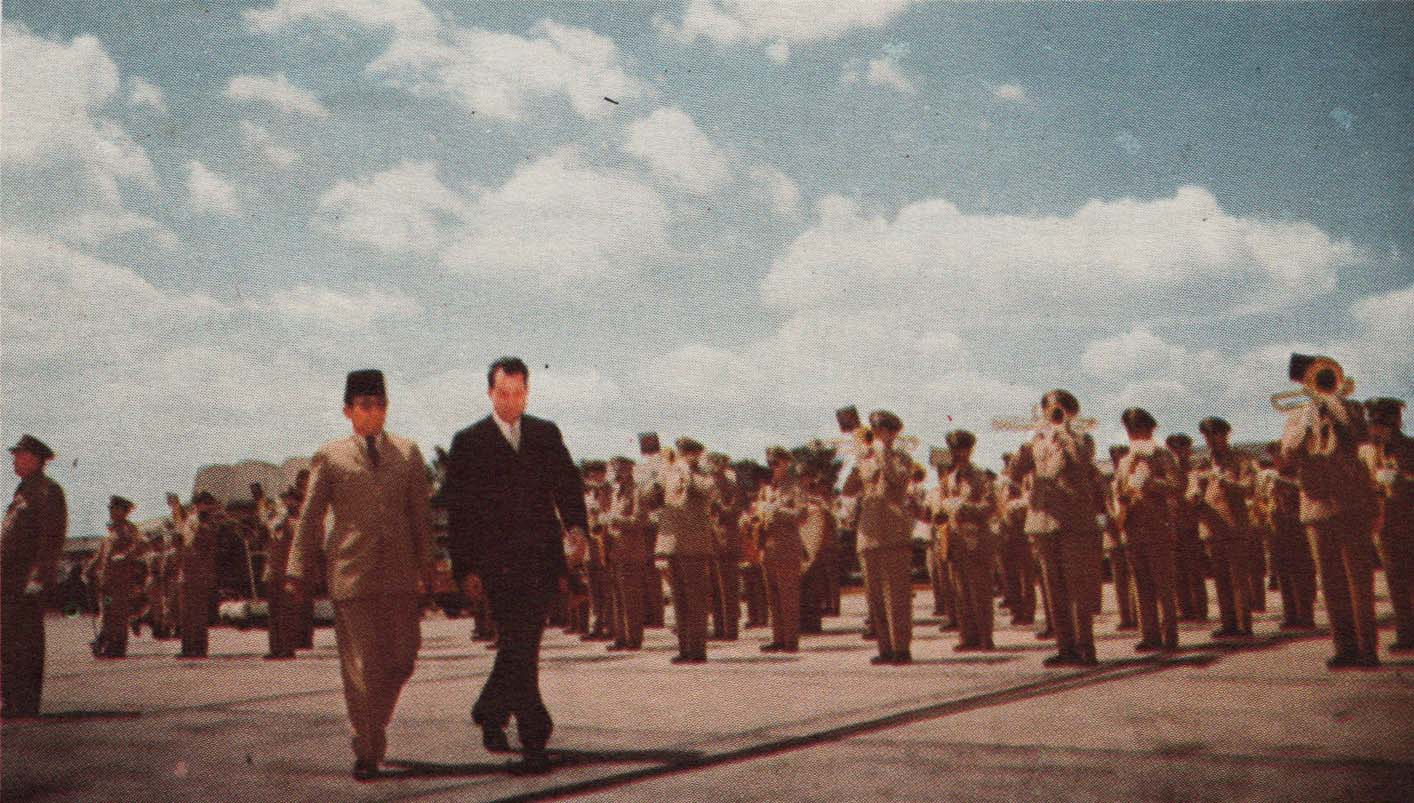

During the brief history of the infamous and controversial Tjakrabirawa Regiment, its honor guard detachment sported a military band that played during national holidays and state visits by foreign leaders to Jakarta. The band in its current capacity was created in January 1976 when the current Paspampres (then Paswalpres) was established and the band's first musicians formed up partly of personnel from the Kodam Jaya Headquarters Band which, for over a decade, served operationally as part of the joint Satgas Pomad Para task force during state visits and national holidays.

It is the main band that plays at official ceremonies and receptions for high-ranking officials that visit Indonesia, including heads of state, heads of government, and diplomatic delegations, as well as in providing musical accompaniment to state ceremonies (including oath taking ceremonies), parades, accreditation ceremonies of ambassadors, and various community events. The band is based in Jakarta, the national capital, and is the official band stationed in the Merdeka Palace within Jakarta during ceremonies of national importance and during state visits to the Republic, a duty it alternates from either the Merdeka Palace and/or at the Bogor Palace in Bogor, West Java.

As the official presidential band it performs for the President, Vice President, and foreign dignitaries during their visits to Merdeka Palace and Bogor Palace, as well as during the Independence Day flag ceremonies every August 17. Also, the band also appears at a wide range of events together with the Headquarters Ceremonial Band of the Indonesian National Armed Forces and the Ceremonial Band of the Indonesian National Police, especially during Armed Forces Day (October 5) and Police Day (June 1).

One of the band's performances was during the 2020 state visit to Indonesia of Singapore President Halimah Yacob.

== See also ==
- Indonesian National Armed Forces
- Paspampres
