= Tandyo Budi Revita =

Indonesian army general (born 1969)

- Born: 21 February 1969 (age 57); Surakarta, Central Java, Indonesia
- Education: Indonesian Military Academy; Cimahi College of Administration Sciences (S.Sos.); Mahendradatta University (M.Si.)
- Spouse: Susi Rianingsih (m. 2001)
- Children: 2
- Military career
- Allegiance: Indonesia
- Branch: Indonesia Army
- Service years: 1991–present
- Rank: General
- Service number: 1910033420269
- Unit: Infantry
- Commands: Army; Diponegoro Regional Military Command; 142nd Taroada Tarogau Military Area Command; 17th Airborne Infantry Brigade; 330th Infantry Battalion
- Conflicts: Indonesian invasion of East Timor; Operation Mantap III; Kuala Task Force

Tandyo Budi Revita (born 21 February 1969) is an Indonesian army general who is currently serving as the army chief of staff. Prior to his appointment, Tandyo had held several leadership positions in the defense ministry and the armed forces service, including as the head of the defence ministry's education and training agency, deputy army chief of staff, and deputy commander of the armed forces.

== Early life and education ==
Tandyo was born on 21 February 1969 in Surakarta as the youngest of five. His mother was a stay-at-home mother, while his father worked as a teacher. His older brother and the third-born children in the family, Nugroho Budi Wiryanto, was a 1987 graduate of the Indonesian Military Academy and a major general in the army's Kopassus special forces. Tandyo and Nugroho were exemplified by military observer Aris Santoso as "spike grass cadets", cadets who came from a humble background but maintained a steady career path in the army. Tandyo's father instilled discipline in the family by implementing a strict routine. Tandyo and his siblings were mandated to study from 7 PM and to watch the Dunia Dalam Berita (The World in News) program at the national television network, broadcast everyday at 9 PM.

Tandyo attended 2nd Surakarta State Middle School, popularly known as Espero, which he completed in 1984. Tandyo then continued his studies at the 2nd Surakarta State High School, which was managed by former members of student soldiers who fought in the Indonesian National Revolution. Military observer Aris Santoso viewed Tandyo's entry into the army as being influenced by civic values instilled during his high school years. Tandyo attended the Indonesian Military Academy and graduated in the class of 1991. He was commissioned as a second lieutenant in the infantry corps and began his duty after finishing basic infantry course. He attended a number of courses outside of the regular military education, including on airborne paratrooping in 1996 and a course on the UN protection of civilians in 1997.

During his army service, Tandyo briefly studied management at the Indonesian Open University in 1993 but later dropped out due to his tour of duty. Tandyo received his bachelor's degree in administration from the Cimahi College of Administration Sciences and his master's degree in law from the Mahendradatta University in Bali. He is currently pursuing a master's degree in universal warfare strategy at the Indonesian Defence University.

== Military career ==
=== Junior officer ===
Tandyo's first assignment as a junior officer was in the 330th Infantry Battalion under the 17th Airborne Infantry Brigade, with the brigade's chief of staff being Lieutenant Colonel Prabowo Subianto. The battalion was deployed for the Mantap III, a routine combat operation to suppress Timorese insurgents, from 1994 to 1995. Tandyo, then already a first lieutenant, commanded a combat intelligence team consisting of 15 soldiers to eliminate wanted Falintil leaders. After three months of tracking down the wanted figures, on the morning of 7 July 1995 two of Tandyo's men killed Cipriano Ribeiro Martins, codenamed Rodak Teki Timur, the Falintil's Uni Dade sector commander and one of the most wanted Timorese insurgency leaders. After his service in East Timor, Tandyo earned a promotion as the commander of the B rifle company in the battalion, the first in his class.

Tandyo's career advanced quickly following a series of combat assignments. In 2004, he became as the deputy commander of the 328th infantry battalion with the rank of major, a position Prabowo had held two decades earlier. After two years in the position, he attended the Army Command and General Staff College for a few months in 2006 as its 44th intake, and afterwards was assigned to the Sriwijaya Regional Military Command based in Palembang, South Sumatra as the commander of the bela negara (civic duty, lit. 'defend the nation') depot of the military command's training regiment until 2007. He returned to the 330th Infantry Battalion for a promotion as the battalion's commander until 2009. On his last year in the battalion, Tandyo became the commander of Indonesia's 15-men contingent to the 2009 Australian Army Skill at Arms Meeting (AASAM) shooting competition, which won first place and the third victory of what would be Indonesia's 12-year winning streak in the competition.

=== Command positions ===
Tandyo became the commander of the 17th Airborne Infantry Brigade from 2011 to 2012. Major Agus Harimurti Yudhoyono, son of former president and the brigade's commander Susilo Bambang Yudhoyono, was his chief of operations in the brigade. During his brief stint, the state-owned telecommunication company Telkom Indonesia partnered with the brigade to install internet facilities in Indonesia's border posts in West Kalimantan. After completing combined command and general staff college in 2014, Tandyo was named as operations assistant to the commander of the Wirabuana regional military command, based in Makassar, South Sulawesi. Tandyo took office as the commander of the Udayana regional military command's training regiment, based in Bali, serving from 17 January to 14 August 2015.

Following consecutive tour of duties in territorial units, Tandyo was reassigned to the Indonesian Military Academy and became the commander of the cadet regiment of the academy on 4 September 2015. In 2016, Tandyo assumed command of the annual joint training program between cadets of the service academies and the home governance academy, which was held at the Bangka Belitung Islands for the year's edition. On 27 May 2016, Tandyo took office of the commander of the 142th Taroada Tarogau military area command, with jurisdiction over the West Sulawesi province. Less than a year later, Tandyo was replaced as the area commander by Colonel Taufiq Shobri on 7 June 2017. He was recalled to the army headquarters as an assistant officer in the operations staff from 2017 to 2018, and in the armed forces headquarters as an assistant officer for joint training. In April 2018, Tandyo briefed Marine soldiers who was about to be deployed to patrol Indonesia's outer islands.

=== Defence ministry ===
On 2 July 2018, the armed forces commander issued a decree which appointed Tandyo as the director of the bela negara program in the defense ministry, a one-star position. He was installed for the position on 30 July and was accordingly promoted to the rank of brigadier general on 4 September 2018. He reported his promotion to the armed forces commander on 5 September and to the defence minister on 14 January 2019. He left his directorship on 1 August 2019, and on 10 September received the armed forces top order, the Grand Meritorious Military Order Star, 3rd Class (Indonesian: Bintang Yudha Dharma Nararya).

Tandyo as the head of the defence ministry's education and training agency

On 5 September 2019, Tandyo took office as the director of defense component mobilization in the defense ministry, with his appointment being confirmed by an armed forces commander decree on 30 October. The-then newly appointed defense minister, Prabowo Subianto, instructed him on 15 May 2020 to oversaw the establishment of the Ben Mboi Indonesia's Defense University Polytechnic in Atambua. Tandyo personally managed the acquisition of the 25-hectare plot of land, oversaw the architectural designs, and supervised the construction process. Constructions began on 28 October 2020 and the polytechnic was inaugurated by president Joko Widodo in February 2022.

Tandyo was promoted to the two-star position of the defence ministry's head of training and education agency on 24 December 2021. He officially assumed office six days later on 30 December in an inauguration ceremony and left his directorship on 5 January 2022. He was promoted to major general on 25 January 2022. On his first month in office, Tandyo oversaw the signing of performance contract for unit heads within the agency.

=== Army and armed forces leadership roles ===
Tandyo was appointed the commander of the Diponegoro Regional Military Command, with jurisdiction over the province of Central Java, on 18 December 2023. He assumed command of the military region on 27 December. About two months later, on 21 February 2024 the armed forces commander promoted Tandyo as the army deputy chief of staff. At his departure ceremony from the Diponegoro Regional Military Command on 9 March 2024, Tandyo publicly apologized for not giving much impact to the development of the regional military command due to the brevity of his two-and-a-half months tenure. Tandyo was inducted as the army deputy chief of staff a day prior on 8 March 2024 and was promoted to lieutenant general on the 25th of the same month. Throughout his leadership of the Diponegoro Regional Military Command, and for the first few days as the army deputy chief of staff, Tandyo remained the head of the defense ministry's training agency head, and it was not until 26 March 2024 that he handed over his old office to Major-General Zainul Arifin.

Tandyo at the 2025 Garuda Shield exercise opening ceremony.

Tandyo (first from left) at the Arlington National Cemetery, 2026.

Tandyo received another promotion as the deputy commander of the armed forces, with him being installed and promoted to the rank of general by the-now President Prabowo Subianto at the armed forces readiness parade on 10 October 2025. Kompas, reporting on his appointment, highlighted his "silent path" in the army and "stellar, yet uncontroversial career". Tandyo was the first officer to occupy the post in 25 years. In January 2026, Tandyo was appointed to lead the Kuala Task Force, responsible to accelerate the recovery process of the Cyclone Senyar disaster in Aceh. Tandyo was conferred the Star of Mahaputera, 2nd class, on the occasion of the armed forces' 81st anniversary on 5 October 2026. Defence observer Erik Purnama Putra noted Tandyo's close relations with defence minister Sjafrie Sjamsoeddin, as he regularly accompanied Sjafrie during his visits to the army's territorial battalion.

On 15 October 2026, Tandyo was installed as the army chief of staff. He swapped posts with the previous army chief of staff, Maruli Simanjuntak, who became the deputy armed forces commander and the head of the national agency for border and remote areas management. Erik Purnama Putra viewed Tandyo's appointment as a preparation to fulfill the prerequisite of becoming the armed forces commander, and that President Prabowo had to sacrifice Maruli's stellar career in order to propel Tandyo's. A handover ceremony was held at the armed forces headquarters the day after he was installed. On his first day in office, Tandyo installed a number of top army officials, including his deputy Tri Budi Utomo and the commanders of the six new regional military commands formed on the occasion of the armed forces' 81st anniversary. On 2 November 2026, Tandyo received a visit from his Australian counterpart Susan Coyle, which marked the first time an Australian military service chief visited Indonesia.

== Personal life ==
Tandyo met his wife, Susi Trianingsih, who hailed from Prabumulih in South Sumatra, after completing his advanced course and combat duty in Papua in December 2000. Susi was introduced to Tandyo by his senior in the army, and the two maintained a long-distance relationship. Tandyo proposed to Susi after four months of courtship, and during their engagement Tandyo set aside Rp500,000 each month from his salary to save for their wedding rings and dowry. The couple eventually married on 14 October 2001. Tandyo's older son, Alif Budi Wiratama, is currently serving in the army, while their younger daughter, Belinda Budi Safira, is currently studying medicine at the General Achmad Yani University.
