= Korem 132/Tadulako =

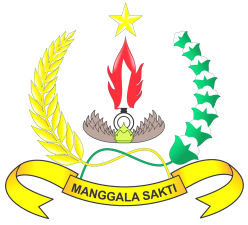
- Insignia of Korem 132/Tadulako
- Country: Indonesia
- Branch: Kodam XIII/Merdeka
- Type: Military Area Command (Korem)
- Garrison/HQ: Palu, Central Sulawesi
- Engagements: Poso riots; Operation Madago Raya

Korem 132/Tadulako or Military Area Command 132nd/Tadulako is a Military Area Command (Korem) under Kodam XIII/Merdeka. Its garrison located on city of Palu, Central Sulawesi. It consists of five military district commands (Kodim) and one light infantry battalion attached located in Poso. The formation is involved in various insurgencies against Islamic extremist insurgency in the region, most recently against East Indonesia Mujahideen in Poso Regency.

== Units ==
- Kodim 1305/Buol-Tolitoli
- Kodim 1306/Donggala
- Kodim 1307/Poso
- Kodim 1308/Luwuk-Banggai
- Kodim 1311/Morowali
- 714th Infantry Battalion/Sintuwu Maroso
