= List of high-ranking commanders of the Indonesian National Revolution =

This list includes high-ranking commanders in Order of battle of the Indonesian National Armed Forces as of January 1946 who took part in the Indonesian National Revolution (1945–1949):

Portrait	Name	Branch	Commands held (1942–1950)	Notes
	Sudirman (1916–1950)	Army	Commander, Battalion III Kroya (Banyumas). PETA (1943); Commander, BKR Banyumas. BKR (1945); Commander, TKR V Division, Panglima TKR. TKR (1945); Panglima of the TRI. TRI (1946); Panglima of the TNI. TNI (1947–1950)	Last rank: Letnan Djenderal (1950); Honorary rank: Djenderal (1950); Jenderal Besar (1997); Highest command held: Commander of the Armed Forces (1945–1950)
	Hamengkubuwono IX (1912–1988)	Army		
	Oerip Soemohardjo (1893–1948)	Army	Retired. KNIL (1942); Chief of Staff of the TKR. TKR (1945); Chief of Staff of the TRI. TRI (1946); Chief of Staff of the TNI. TNI (1947–1948)	Military academy: Militaire School te Meester Cornelis (1914); Last rank: Letnan Djenderal (1948); Honorary rank: Djenderal (1948); Highest command held: Commander of the Armed Forces (1945, acting)
	Soerjadi Soerjadarma (1912–1975)	Air Force	Officier-vlieger der 2e klasse. KNIL (1942); Chief of Staff, TKR Djawatan Penerbangan. TKR (1945); Chief of Staff, TRI Angkatan Udara. TRI (1946); Chief of Staff of the Indonesian Air Force. TNI (1947–1950)	Military academy: Koninklijke Militaire Academie, Breda(1932); Last rank: Laksamana Udara (1962); Highest command held: Commander of the Armed Forces (1959–1962)
	Mas Pardi (1901–1968)	Navy	Chief-of-Staff, BKR Laut. BKR (1945); Chief-of-Staff, TKR Laut. TKR (1945); Chief of Staff of the Indonesian Navy. TRI (1946)	Last rank: Laksamana III (1945); Highest command held: Chief of Staff of the Navy (1945–1946)
	Djatikoesoemo (1917–1992)	Army	Company commander (Surakarta). PETA (1943); Battalion commander. BKR (1945); Commander, TKR IV Division. TKR (1945); Commander, TRI V Division. TRI (1946); Commander, TNI V Division/Ronggolawe. TNI (1947); Chief of Staff of the Army. TNI (1948–1949)	Military academy: Corps Opleiding Voor Reserve Officieren; Last rank: Djenderal Major (1963); Honorary rank: Djenderal (1973); Highest command held: Chief of Staff of the Army
	Abdul Haris Nasution (1918–2000)	Army	Vaandrig (Officer candidate). KNIL (1942); Commander, TKR III Division. TKR (1945); Commander, TRI Division I/Siliwangi. TRI (1946); Commander, TNI Division I/Siliwangi. TNI (1947); Commander, KRU-Z (General Reserve Corps-Z). TNI (1948); Deputy Commander. TNI (1948–1953); Chief of Staff of the Army. TNI (1949–1952); Chief of Staff, APRI/APRIS. TNI (1950)	Military academy: Corps Opleiding Voor Reserve Officieren (1942); Last rank: Djenderal (1966); Honorary rank: Jenderal Besar (1997); Highest command held: Commander of the Armed Forces (1962–1966)
	T.B. Simatupang (1920–1990)	Army	Vaandrig (Officer candidate). KNIL (1942); Vice Chief of Staff, TKR. TKR (1945); Vice Chief of Staff, TRI. TRI (1946); Vice Chief of Staff, TNI. TNI (1947–1948); Chief of Staff of the Armed Forces. TNI (1950–1952)	Military academy: Koninklijke Militaire Academie, Bandung (1942); Last rank: Letnan Djenderal (1959); Highest command held: Commander of the Armed Forces (1950–1952)
	Mohammad Nazir (1910–1982)	Navy	Commander, TKR-Laut II Division. TKR (1945); Chief of General Staff of the Navy. TRI (1946); Chief of Staff of the Indonesian Navy. TNI (1947–1948)	Last rank: Komodor (1957); Highest command held: Chief of Staff of the Navy (1946–1948)
	Gatot Subroto (1907–1962)	Army	Sergeant. KNIL; Company commander (Sumpiuh, Banyumas). PETA; Battalion commander (Banyumas). PETA; Commander, TRI Division II. TRI (1946); Commander, TNI Division II/Sunan Gunung Jati. TNI (1947); Commander, Army Military Police. TNI (1948–1949); Commander, Division III/Diponegoro. TNI (1949); Commander, Tentara Teritorium IV/Djawa Tengah. TNI (1949)	Last rank: Letnan Jenderal (1962); Honorary rank: Djenderal (posthumously); Highest command held: Deputy/Vice Chief of Staff of the Army (1956–1962)
	Suharto (1921–2008)	Army	KNIL XIII Battalion. KNIL (1942); Platoon commander (Wates). PETA (1943); Company commander (Madiun). PETA (1943); Battalion commander. TKR (1945); Battalion commander. TRI (1946); Commander, 22nd Regiment, TNI Division III/Pangeran Diponegoro. TNI (1947–1948); Commander, 10th Brigade, Wehrkreise III. TNI (1949); Brigade commander, TNI Division III/Pangeran Diponegoro. TNI (1950)	Military academy: KNIL Kaderschool Gombong (1942); Last rank: Djenderal; Honorary rank: Jenderal Besar (1997); Highest command held: Commander of the Armed Forces (1968–1973)
	Soesalit Djojoadhiningrat (1904–1962)	Army	Commander, Banyumas II (Sumpiuh). PETA (1943–1945); Regimental commander (Tegal). BKR/TKR (1945); Commander, Brigade V, Division II, Cirebon. TRI (1946); Commander, TNI Division III/Pangeran Diponegoro. TNI (1946–1948); Commander, TNI Division I/Diponegoro. TNI (1948)	Last rank: Kolonel (1955); Highest rank held: Djenderal Major (1948)
	Bambang Sugeng (1913–1977)	Army		
	Zulkifli Lubis (1923–1993)	Army		Last rank: Kolonel (1955); Highest command held: Chief of Staff of the Army (1955, acting)
	Bambang Oetojo (1920–1980)	Army		Last rank: Letnan Djenderal (1955); Honorary rank: Jenderal (1997); Highest command held: Chief of Staff of the Army (1955)
	Didi Kartasasmita			Last rank: Djenderal Major (1945); Highest command held: Commander, East Java Command
	Mustopo (1913–1986)	Army		Last rank: Djenderal Major (1945); Highest command held: Commander, East Java Command
	Soengkono (1911–1977)	Army	Company Commander (Surabaya). PETA (1943); Company Commander, BKR Surabaya. BKR (1945); Commander, TKR Division VII. TKR (1945); Commander, TRI Division VI/Narotama. TRI (1946); Military Governor, East Java Command. TNI (1948); Commander, TNI Division I/Brawijaya. TNI (1950)	Last rank: Djenderal Major (1945); Highest command held: Military Governor, East Java Command
	Muhammad Mangundiprojo (1905–1988)	Army	Company Commander (Sidoarjo). PETA (1943); Company Commander, TKR Sidoarjo. TKR (1945)	Last rank: Djenderal Major (1945); Highest command held: Commander, East Java Command
	Said Soekanto Tjokrodiatmodjo (1908–1993)	National Police	Chief of the National Police. POLRI (1945–1959)	
	Raden Soemarto	National Police		
	Muhammad Yasin (1920–2012)	National Police	Commander, Special Police Troops, Surabaya. TKR (1945)	Last rank: Djenderal Major (1945)
	Suhardjo Hardjowardojo (1900–1969)			Last rank: Djenderal Major (1945); Highest command held: Commander, Sumatera Command
	Hidajat Martaatmadja (1915–2005)			Last rank: Letnan Djenderal (1963); Highest command held: Commander, Sumatera Command
	Eddy Martadinata (1921–1966)	Navy		Last rank: Laksamana Madya (1964); Highest command held: Chief of Staff of the Navy (1959–1966)
	Ahmad Yani (1922–1965)	Army		Last rank: Letnan Djenderal (1965); Highest command held: Chief of Staff of the Army (1962–1965)
	Maraden Panggabean (1922–2000)	Army		Last rank: Djenderal (1969); Highest command held: Commander of the Armed Forces (1972–1978)
	Umar Wirahadikusumah (1924–2003)	Army		Last rank: Jenderal (1973); Highest command held: Chief of Staff of the Army (1969–1973)
	M. Jusuf (1928–2004)	Army		Last rank: Jenderal (1978); Highest command held: Commander of the Armed Forces (1978–1983)
	Basuki Rahmat (1921–1969)	Army		Last rank: Djenderal Major (1967); Highest command held: Division commander
	Amir Machmud (1923–1995)	Army		Last rank: Jenderal (1978); Highest rank held: Division commander
	Slamet Rijadi (1927–1950)	Army		Last rank: Kolonel; Honorary rank: Brigadier Djendral (1950, posthumously)
