= Indonesian National Armed Forces (January 1946) order of battle =

The following is an order of battle of the Indonesian National Armed Forces as of 8 January 1946, after the then People's Security Armed Forces (Tentara Keamanan Rakyat) was transformed into the People's Safety Armed Forces (Tentara Keselamatan Rakyat) by Presidential Resolution #2/1946.

== Formation of the People's Security Armed Forces ==
The INAF traces its origins to the 5 October 1945 declaration of the formation of an active national armed forces for the republic by no less than the first Vice President of Indonesia, Mohammad Hatta, acting on behalf of then president Sukarno, on the basis of the People's Security Agency (Badan Keamanan Rakyat) created just days after independence as a paramilitary gendarmerie for the infant republic, originally planned as a national army. The job of activating a national military fell on the hands of ex-Royal Netherlands East Indies Army Major Oerip Soemohardjo, who was appointed the first Commander of the Armed Forces ad interim, pending any word from Soeprijadi, who would be appointed the first commander of the armed services. Many of the first generation enlisted personnel and NCOs served either with the Defenders of the Homeland (Pembela Tanah Air, or PETA) or the Japanese-sponsored Heiho, both during the period of Japanese occupation, reinforced by youthful pemuda or revolutionaries later on, while many of its officer corps who served in either of the two were trained as cadets of the RNEIA in the Koninklijke Militaire Academie in Breda, The Netherlands and were commissioned into that force. However, these officers were poorly received by Indonesian nationalists, who viewed them as mercenaries for having served in the Dutch forces. Although Oerip set out a command structure, in reality the army's hierarchy was provisional and depended heavily on the strength of local units.

On 14 October, General Oerip officially received his interim appointment and left immediately for Jakarta. In a cabinet meeting the following day, he was ordered to build a national armed forces headquartered in Yogyakarta, in preparation for an expected assault by Dutch troops coming to reclaim the Indies. Urip had originally suggested using Purwokerto for his headquarters, but ultimately Yogyakarta was chosen as it had better facilities and guaranteed support from the local ruler. He departed for Yogyakarta on 16 October, and arrived the following day. He first established the general headquarters in a room at Hotel Merdeka, which he used until the Sultan of Yogyakarta Hamengkubuwono IX donated land and a building to be utilized as the General Headquarters of the young armed forces. On 20 October, when learning that Soeprijadi was declared missing (Note: The historian Amrin Imran suggests that Soeprijadi's appointment may have been a way to see if he was still alive; it may have been thought that he would have certainly contacted the government in Jakarta to take over this post if he were.) Imam Muhammad Suliyoadikusumo was appointed by the cabinet as ad interim Minister of Defence, later on the guerrilla leader Moestopo declared himself Minister of Defence. As such, Oerip had little oversight and felt pressured to quickly establish a stable command structure, while also began to form the a high command structure for the armed services, and later moved the general HQ to Purwokerto.

On 2 November, the ground forces of the nascent INAF, the future Indonesian Army, were divided into four territorial corps, each led by a general officer. These were Didi Kartasasmita for western Java, Soeratman for central Java, Mohammad for eastern Java and Soehardjo Hardjowardojo for Sumatra.

Each of these sub-commanders was commissioned into the rank of major general. Oerip also began appropriating weapons to different TKR commands. He took confiscated Japanese weapons from well-equipped forces and distributed them as needed. However, the results were less successful than he had hoped. PETA had been organised locally during the Japanese occupation, and as such its members were unable to accept a centralised leadership.

=== Appointment of Soedirman ===
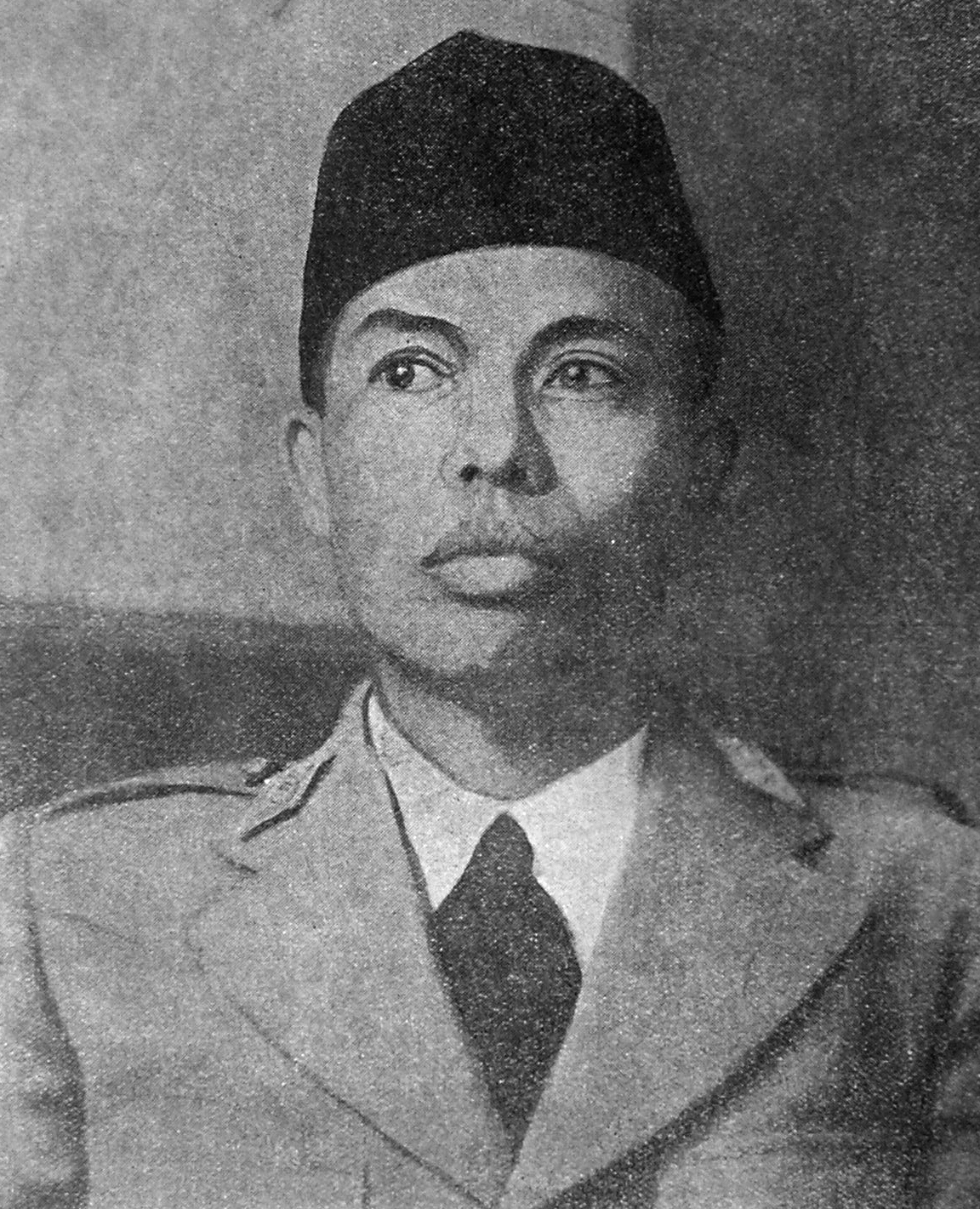
General Soedirman was elected as commander of the TKR on 12 November 1945. He kept Urip as his chief of staff.

On 12 November 1945, at the first general meeting of army leadership, Colonel Soedirman – the then commanding officer of the Fifth Division in Purwokerto, who had two years military experience and was 23 years younger than Urip – was elected Commanding General of the Armed Forces (Panglima Besar) following two deadlocked votes. In the third round, General Oerip had 21 votes to Soedirman's 22. Divisional commanders from Sumatera, who had voted unanimously, swayed the vote in Sudirman's favour; Urip had lost votes because some of the division leaders distrusted his history with the KNIL and the oath he had taken to the Dutch motherland upon graduation. Although Soedirman was surprised at his selection and offered to surrender the leadership position to Oerip, the meeting did not allow it; he himself was glad to no longer be in charge of the armed forces. Soedirman kept Oerip, by then a lieutenant general, to serve as chief of staff of the armed forces. While Soedirman remained unconfirmed, Urip remained de jure commander; however, the Indonesian journalist Salim Said writes that his orders were at times unintelligible owing to Urip's poor command of Indonesian and often ignored unless approved by Soedirman. (Note: Urip was fluent in Dutch and Javanese, but had a poor command of Indonesian, which had gained mainstream currency in the early 20th century.)

When General Soedirman was approved on 18 December, he began working to consolidate and unite the armed forces. Meanwhile, Oerip handled day-to-day organisational and technical issues. Many of the details, such as company uniforms, he left to regional commanders. (Note: At the time, the Indonesian National Armed Forces did not have the resources to enforce a standard uniform nationwide.) However, to deal with more important issues, such as establishing a military police and preventing enemy paratroopers from landing, he passed edicts that applied nationally.Together, Soedirman and Oerip were instrumental to unite the differences between armed forces personnel who served in both sides of the Second World War and were now united under one armed service.

=== Creation of the navy and air force ===
One of Oerip's final orders as Commander of the Armed Forces was to create a national navy, to that effort the Indonesian Navy (then the People's Security Navy or TKR Laut) was officially established, with HQ in Yogyakarta, on 15 November 1945. Mas Pardi, Mohammad Nazir, Soemarno, RE Martadinata, and R Soeardi of the armed forces general staff were all instrumental in its formation, Pardi would later be named the first Chief of Staff of the Navy with effect from 1 December 1945. By New Year's Eve 1945, the Navy was divided into four fleet divisions and was starting its naval bases in the republican territories in Sumatra with access to the sea.

== Order of battle of the armed forces as of 8 January 1946 ==
=== Supreme General Command ===
- President of Indonesia: Sukarno
- Vice President of Indonesia: Mohammad Hatta
- Prime Minister of Indonesia: Sutan Sjahrir
- Minister of Defence of the Republic: Amir Sjarifoeddin
- Commanding General of the People's Safety Armed Forces: Gen Soedirman
- Chief of the General Staff: Lt Gen Oerip Soemohardjo
- Chief of Staff of the Navy: Rear Adm Mas Pardi

=== Territorial Corps ===
Territorial Corps	Commanding general	Area of responsibility
West Java Corps	Maj Gen Didi Kartasasmita	West Java (including present day Banten and Jakarta)
Central Java Corps	Maj Gen Soedibjo; Maj Gen Soerachmat	Central Java (including present day Yogyakarta Special Region)
East Java Corps	Maj Gen Mustopo; Maj Gen Muhammad Mangundiprodjo	East Java
Sumatra Corps	Maj Gen Suhardjo Hardjowardojo	Sumatra

Army divisions under territorial commands
Name	HQ located in	Officer commanding	Under Territorial Corps
1st Infantry Division	Serang	Col K.H. Syam'un	West Java
2nd Division	Linggardjati	Col Asikin	West Java
3rd Infantry Division	Bandung	Col Arudji Kartawinata; Col A.H. Nasution	West Java
4th Division	Salatiga	Maj. Gen G.P.H. Djatikoesoemo	Central Java
5th Infantry Division	Purwokerto	Col Sutirto	Central Java
9th Division	Yogyakarta	Maj Gen R.P. Sudarsono	Central Java
10th Infantry Division	Surakarta	Col Sutarto	Central Java
6th Division	Kediri	Col Sudiro	East Java
7th Division	Modjokerto	Maj Gen Jonosewojo; Col Sungkono	East Java
8th Division	Malang	Maj Gen Imam Sudja'i	East Java
1st Sumatra Division	Lahat	Col Maludin Simbolon; Col Barlian	Sumatra
2nd Sumatra Infantry Division	Palembang	Col M. Nuh; Col Hasan Kasim; Kolonel Bambang Utojo	Sumatra
3rd Sumatra Division	Bukittinggi	Col Dahlan Djambek	Sumatra
4th Sumatra Division	Medan	Col Achmad Tahir; Col Hotman Sitompul	Sumatra
5th Sumatra Division	Bireuen	Col Sjamaun Gaharu	Sumatra
6th Sumatra Division	Sibolga	Col Mohammad Dien gelar Sinartang	Sumatra

Under other branches
Name	HQ located	Officer commanding	Subordinated to
TKRL West Java Fleet	Cirebon	Rear Adm Adam	HQ Indonesian Navy
TKRL Central Java Fleet	Purworedjo	Rear Adm M. Nazir	HQ Indonesian Navy
TKRL East Java Fleet	Surabaya	Rear Adm A.R. Aris	HQ Indonesian Navy

=== General Directorate of Aviation of the General Staff of the Armed Forces ===
- Chief of Military Aviation: AVM Soerjadi Soerjadarma
- Deputy Chief of Military Aviation: Group Captain Soekarmen Martodisoemo

== See also ==
- Military history of Indonesia
- Indonesian National Revolution
