= Samsoeddin =

Indonesian politician (1908–1950)

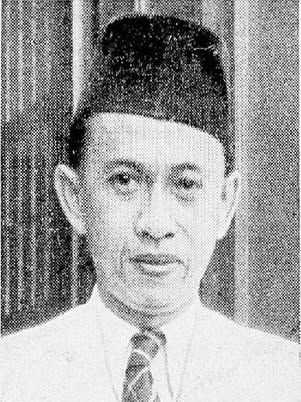
- Samsoedin, c. 1943

Deputy Prime Minister of Indonesia
- In office 11 November 1947 – 29 January 1948
- Prime Minister: Amir Sjarifuddin

Minister of Information
- In office 4 August 1949 – 21 January 1950
- Prime Minister: Mohammad Hatta; Susanto Tirtoprodjo
- Preceded by: Sjafruddin Prawiranegara
- Succeeded by: Arnold Mononutu (RIS); Wiwoho Purbohadidjojo (RI)

Member of the Volksraad
- In office January 1941 – 1942
- Preceded by: Mohammad Husni Thamrin

Mayor of Sukabumi
- In office 2 November 1944 – September 1946
- Succeeded by: Soeria Hoedjaja

Personal details
- Born: 1 January 1908 Sukabumi, Dutch East Indies
- Died: 15 October 1950 (aged 42) Jakarta, Indonesia
- Education: Leiden University

Raden Samsoeddin (Note: Other spellings include Samsoedin, Samsuddin, Sjamsoeddin, Syamsudin, and Shamsuddin.) (1 January 1908 – 15 October 1950) was an Indonesian lawyer and politician. He was active during the late colonial and early independence period, being a member of the Volksraad and the Investigating Committee for Preparatory Work for Independence during the early 1940s, along with serving as Deputy Prime Minister and Minister of Information during the late 1940s. He was also the first Indonesian mayor of Sukabumi between 1944 and 1946 and the first Ambassador to Pakistan.

Originating from Sukabumi, Samsoeddin studied as a lawyer and received his master's degree from Leiden University before returning to Indonesia. He practiced law and was active in the colonial government and politics during the late Dutch period, before joining various Japanese-sponsored organizations during the occupation, notably the 3A propaganda movement which he co-founded and led in 1942. He then joined the Masyumi party after Indonesian independence, and was appointed minister in several cabinets until shortly before his death in October 1950.

== Early life ==
Samsoeddin was born on 1 January 1908 in Sukabumi to native colonial official Ahmad Djoewaini and Djoewaini's third wife RE Djoewitaningrat. He began his education at a private religious school, where he studied for two years before enrolling at an Europeesche Lagere School (elementary school for Europeans, graduated 1922) and a Meer Uitgebreid Lager Onderwijs (middle school, graduated 1926). He then continued his studies at a high school (Algemene middelbare school) in Bandung, graduating in 1929.

Samsoeddin continued his studies at the colonial capital of Batavia, studying law for two years there at the Rechtshoogeschool. During this time, he joined the Indonesian nationalist movement and worked at the newspaper Berita Oemoem. On one occasion in December 1931, he gave a speech in Surabaya on agricultural policy, specifically opposing the granting of land ownership to Indo people. He then went to the Netherlands, studying law at Leiden University and receiving his Master of Laws (Mr.) degree in 1935.

== Career ==
=== Dutch and Japanese periods ===
Following his return from the Netherlands, he worked for a time for the colonial government. By 1938, he had been appointed as vice mayor of Bogor, and in 1940 he was appointed to the city council of Batavia. He also practiced law, founding his own law office in 1939 based in Bogor. The law office would later establish branches in Sukabumi, Cianjur, Tasikmalaya, and Batavia. In January 1941, Samsoeddin was appointed to the Volksraad to replace Mohammad Husni Thamrin following Thamrin's death. He also served as an advisor to a private bank and the labor union PKVI, and continued to work at Berita Oemoem.

Shortly after the Japanese takeover, Samsoeddin established communication with Japanese propaganda department leader Hitoshi Shimizu. He would be appointed by the Japanese occupation government as chairman of the committee for the 3A propaganda movement, formed eight days after the Dutch surrender. The propaganda movement's name and slogan largely came from Samsoeddin. He was also involved in the publication of the Asia Raya newspaper. As the propaganda organization's leader, Samsoeddin would explicitly prohibit Dutch-era native officials from joining the movement in order to prevent the old power structure from taking it over. The 3A movement was poorly received by both native Indonesians and by Japanese military officers, and by August 1942 its activities had petered out.

In May 1943, Samsoeddin was appointed as a member of the Center of the People's Power (Putera) propaganda organization, and in October that year to the Central Advisory Council. However, due to his criticism of the Japanese government over agricultural policy (namely over rice collection from farmers) he was removed from the Council on 1 March 1944. Later, he would be appointed as mayor of Sukabumi on 2 November 1944. He was the first native Indonesian to serve as mayor in Sukabumi. In the final months of the occupation, he was appointed as a member of the Investigating Committee for Preparatory Work for Independence (BPUPK) in May 1945.

=== Revolution and post-independence ===
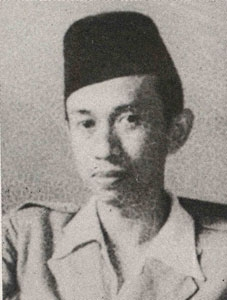
Samsoeddin as Minister of Information, 1949.

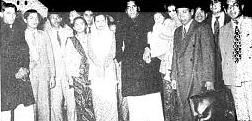
Samsoeddin (with briefcase) arriving in Pakistan, April 1950.

Samsoeddin retained his office as Sukabumi's mayor following the proclamation of Indonesian independence in August 1945. He had received news of the Japanese surrender on 16 August from his wife Artinah, and during the independence proclamation the following day Samsoeddin along with municipal workers of Sukabumi listened to a live broadcast of the proclamation. Following the battle of Bojong Kokosan in December 1945, in which British troops headed to Bandung were ambushed by Indonesian fighters in Sukabumi, Samsoeddin facilitated negotiations which ultimately permitted British forces to pass to Bandung while the nationalist People's Security Army (TKR) would become involved in the transfer of Allied prisoners of war held in Bandung and the disarming of Japanese troops.

He resigned as mayor of Sukabumi in September 1946, and he was replaced by Soeria Hoedjaja. Samsoeddin proceeded to become active in the Hizbullah Islamic militia operating around Sukabumi. Politically, Samsoedin was a member of the Islamic Masyumi party, and sat within the party's leadership council. He was also a member of the Central Indonesian National Committee as a Masyumi representative, and he was appointed to a 47-man Working Committee of the body in March 1947. After a brief period as a guerilla in the southern parts of Sukabumi Regency, he joined the Indonesian government in Yogyakarta following the Dutch military offensive of 1947 and the following Renville Agreement.

In Yogyakarta, Samsoeddin was appointed deputy prime minister on 11 November 1947 by Prime Minister Amir Sjarifuddin, who sought to include a Masyumi member in his cabinet to solidify its position ahead of negotiations with the Dutch. Samsoeddin served in this post until 29 January 1948. He would be appointed minister again in 1949 in the Second Hatta Cabinet, becoming Minister of Information on 4 August 1949. In his position as Information Minister, Samsoeddin called for Chinese Indonesians to refrain from supporting the Dutch. As the Dutch–Indonesian Round Table Conference took place, he visited the Indonesian negotiating delegation in The Hague representing both the Indonesian government and Masyumi to clear up some issues which had emerged between the government and the delegation.

During the United States of Indonesia period, Samsoeddin continued serving as information minister until 21 January 1950 under the Susanto Cabinet of the State of the Republic of Indonesia. (Note: Not in the United States of Indonesia itself, which had Arnold Mononutu as Information Minister.) After his ministerial tenure, he was appointed as the first Indonesian Ambassador to Pakistan by Presidential Decree No. 75 of 1950 in February 1950. He presented his credentials to the Governor-General of Pakistan in Karachi on 8 April 1950, bringing his wife and two children with him in the assignment.

== Death ==
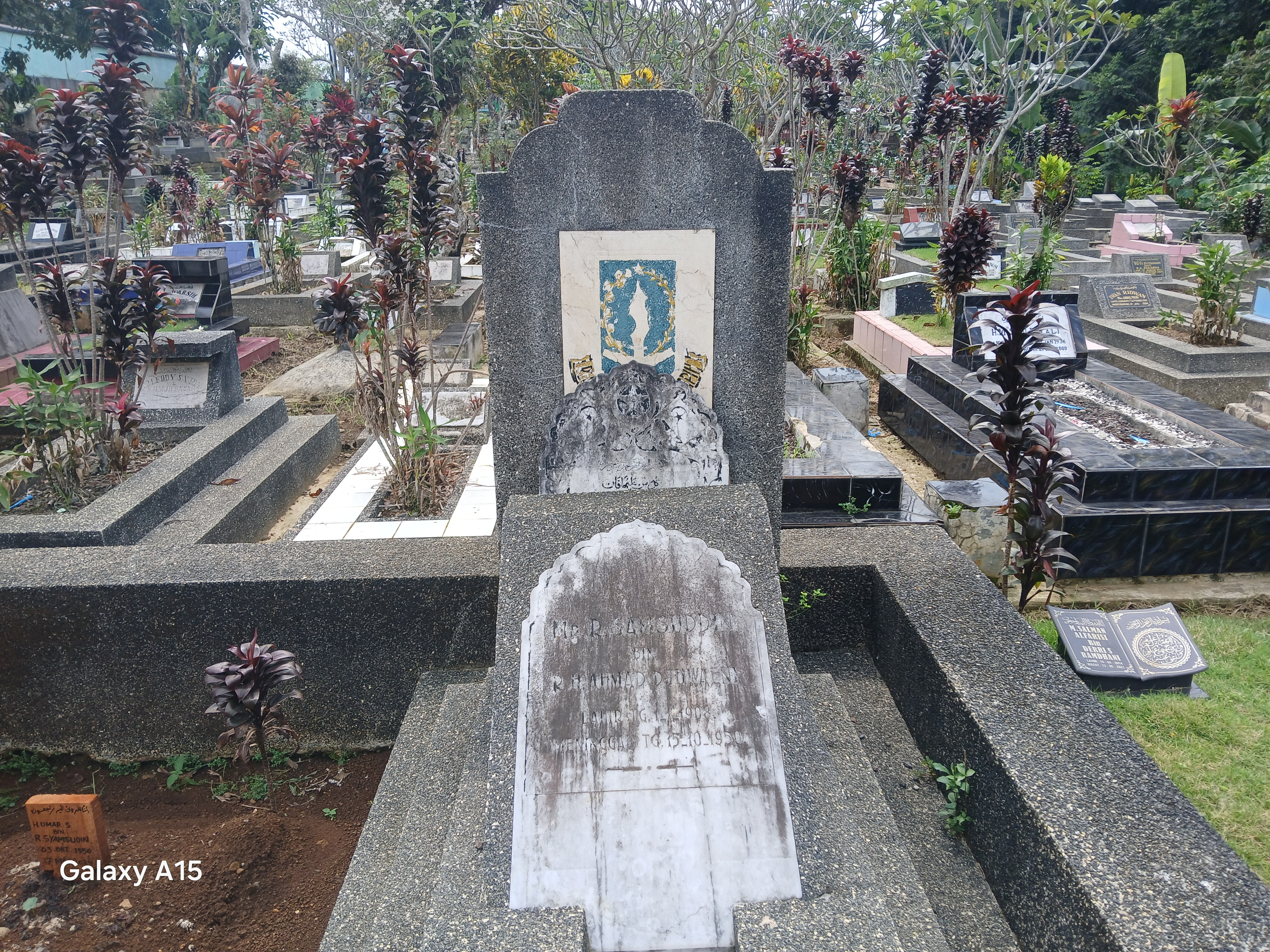
Samsoeddin's grave in Sukabumi.

By October 1950, Samsoeddin was suffering from a liver illness, and he died on 15 October at the Salemba Hospital in Jakarta. After a funeral at Sukabumi's Great Mosque, he was buried in Sukabumi's Ciandam Public Cemetery. Sukabumi's public hospital (opened in 1920) would be renamed in his honor, along with a street in front of Sukabumi's city hall. He would be posthumously awarded the Star of Mahaputera, 3rd class in 1996 by President Suharto.
