= Greater Jakarta People's Militia =

- Laskar Rakyat Djakarta Raya
- Founded: 1947
- Dates active: 1945–1947
- Active regions: West Java
- Wars: Indonesian National Revolution

The Greater Jakarta People's Militia (Indonesian: Laskar Rakyat Djakarta Raya) was an irregular military unit active in Jakarta and surroundings during the Indonesian National Revolution. It originated as a group of radical youths, and later grew with organized crime groups and became a large irregular force in the outskirts of Jakarta. The group is considered to be pro-Tan Malaka.

Though the militia fought against the British and Dutch forces, they also fought against the Indonesian Army due to both ideological and territorial disputes. The group was scattered following an offensive by the Indonesian Army in April 1947, with its members later joining both sides of the conflict.

== History ==
=== Early years ===
The organization originated from the Angkatan Pemuda Indonesia - an organization formed by radical members of the People's Security Agency on 1 September 1945 - which organized and coordinated other youth groups across the city. API developed connections with underworld organizations of the city, due to API's political influence and the gangs' supply of weaponry. Despite so, API largely refrained from large-scale violence in its early period. API later announced a mass rally at Lapangan Ikada on 17 September 1945 - despite the presence of Japanese forces still - and the rally ended peacefully, with about 200,000 attendants and the presence of Republican leaders including Sukarno.

Even prior to the Ikada rally, API had seized control of railways and tramways in Jakarta, and implemented free charges on the public transports. The group also established barricades on the city's roads, terrorizing the city's European community. Eventually, counter-terror operations - which included similar acts of terror against openly Republican-leaning Indonesians - resulted in the API considering of relocating outside the urban areas.

The various groups under API was later reorganized as singular group, the Laskar Rakyat Djakarta Raya (LRJR), which was declared on 22 November 1945 in Salemba. Despite LRJR's attempt to remain inside Jakarta, Operation Pounce launched by British forces on 27 December forced the group to evacuate the city, and moved to Karawang, some eighty kilometers away. There, it used the Radio Republik Indonesia transmitter and published a newspaper, titled Goedam Djelata. LRJR was then organized into seven units, and formed relations and alliances with other revolutionary groups. At the time of the move to Karawang, LRJR had around seven hundred armed members, with the best equipment compared to other armed groups.

Politically, the LRJR became closely associated with Tan Malaka's Persatuan Perjuangan. Chairul Saleh, a member of the LRJR's political leadership, was later appointed head of Persatuan Perjuangan's political section, with Tan Malaka serving as the organization's promotor.

=== In Karawang ===
During its time at Karawang, LRJR and other armed groups controlled trade links between there and Jakarta, controlling the Karawang railway station. The group was initially supported by the Republican authorities, along with other irregular groups across Indonesia, and organized a central organization for the groups to coordinate, hence granting them formal military status. However, when the Indonesian administration called for a merging of the various armed groups into the Indonesian National Armed Forces (then known as the Republic of Indonesia Armed Forces, Tentara Republik Indonesia or TRI), LRJR resisted the move.

LRJR was strongly opposed to the Linggadjati Agreement of November 1946, and openly called Sukarno and Hatta as "traitors". The group also incited fighting against TRI, at occasions attacking TRI posts. The LRJR then followed the Persatuan Perjuangan's campaign for recognition of complete Indonesian independence before negotiations with the Netherlands. During the ceasefire negotiations that preceded Linggadjati, LRJR had launched a major attack against a Dutch barracks on 26 September 1946. LRJR later founded the Laskar Rakyat Jawa Barat - a coalition of laskar groups across West Java.

During the negotiation process for the detailed demarcations of the Linggadjati Agreement, commander of Republican forces around the east of Jakarta Suroto Kunto disappeared, and was presumed kidnapped and killed. Kunto's superior Daan Jahja assumed that LRJR was the group responsible for the kidnapping, arrested a LRJR member and nearly killed him though he was prevented by Siliwangi Division commander Abdul Haris Nasution, who was wary of conflict with LRJR.

=== Dissolution ===
Relationship between TRI and LRJR further soured as the government attempted to enforce a monopoly on the Karawang-Jakarta trade, and a propaganda campaign painting LRJR as traitors was launched. In April 1947, TRI's Purwakarta commander communicated with the Dutch forces in Bogor and Jakarta, noting that they were planning on a "clean up" (i.e. handle the laskar), requesting "gentlemanly behavior" from the Dutch.

The army began by disarming smaller armed groups and mobilized to surround Karawang. After a mortar was fired by the LRJR, TRI artillery units began to bombard LRJR positions, causing disorder in the LRJR ranks and inflicting casualties. By 19 April, the army had entered Karawang with little resistance and a week later the fighting ended.

Some former members and leaders of LRJR eventually joined the Dutch side of the revolution, granted amnesty and was merged into the Hare Majesteit's Ongeregelde Troepen (Her Majesty's Irregular Troops) unit. Others later formed the 17 August Division who fought a guerrilla war against Dutch forces in West Java following the Renville Agreement, but the division was eventually disbanded on 1 September 1949, as it became clear that Dutch forces would withdraw from Indonesia.

=== Notable members ===
Some members of LRJR who later rose in politics include Chairul Saleh, member of LRJR's political council, who later served in various high-ranking political posts. Imam Syafei, who was a commander in LRJR, later became the Minister of Public Security under Sukarno's government.
