= Central Registration Number =

Central Registration Number (Indonesian: Nomor Registrasi Pokok, NRP) is used by the Indonesian National Armed Forces as the primary means of service member identification.

== Background ==
After the Indonesian National Revolution has ended, there were no methods to identify official members of the Indonesian Armed Forces. A lot of rogues and street warriors claimed themselves as the member of the armed forces, which caused confusion among commanders. Further aggression and attacks by the Dutch forces in Indonesia also rendered any means of identification impossible.

Major General Bambang Sugeng, as the Chief of Staff of the Indonesian Army began the first attempts at creating an identification numbers for members of the Indonesian Army. He order regional commanders to enlist their troops. As a result, 88,324 members of the Indonesian Army were officially recorded.

Sugeng then enacted another decision to regulate the Central Registration Number for the Indonesian Army. The system was officially enacted in 1955, 4 years after the decision was enacted. Soon, the other forces, such as the Indonesian Navy and Indonesian Air Force followed suit.

== Format ==
=== Indonesian Army ===
The Central Registration Number was divided between commissioned officers and enlisted grades. For commissioned officers, the number extends from 10001 to 99999. For enlisted grades, the number extends from 100001 to 999999.

The following are the original service numbers which were first issued to Indonesian Army military personnel:

- 10001: Major General Bambang Sugeng
- 100001: Chief Warrant Officer Prayitno

=== Indonesian Navy ===
The following are the original service number which were first issued to Indonesian Navy military personnel:

- 1/P: Vice Admiral R. Soebijakto

=== Indonesian Air Force ===
The following are the original service number which were first issued to Indonesian Air Force military personnel:

- 460001: Air Marshal Suryadi Suryadarma
