= Soeroto Koento =

Indonesian military officer

- Born: 1921 or 1922
- Military career
- Allegiance: Indonesia (1945–1946)
- Branch: Indonesian Army
- Service years: 1945–1946
- Rank: Lieutenant colonel
- Conflicts: Indonesian National Revolution

Lieutenant Colonel Soeroto Koento (born 1921 or 1922) was an Indonesian military officer who got involved in the Indonesian National Revolution. He was declared missing on November 27, 1946.

== Early life and education ==
Koento was born in 1921 or 1922. He received his education at AMS-B. During the Japanese occupation, he was a medical student. However, he did not finish his studies because he refused to have his hair shaved. He then joined the Islamic High School youth group.

== 1945–1946 ==
On August 15, 1945, Japan surrendered to the Allies. Koento managed to obtain the news from Allied radio by breaking the radio seal. He spread the news to his colleagues at the PETA headquarters, Budi Kemuliaan Dormitory in Jakarta. From the news, the PETA officers asked four people, including Koento, to meet Sukarno and Mohammad Hatta. The four young men then met them and urged them to proclaim independence immediately.

After the proclamation of independence, Koento joined the Greater Jakarta BKR Regeiment V and became a subordinate of Moeffreni Moe'min. He also worked as a guard for Soekarno during the Ikada Giant Meeting.

On an unknown date, Koento moved to Cikampek and was appointed as the Chief of Staff of the Cikampek V Regiment. As chief, he was tasked with overseeing the train traffic carrying prisoners. In 1946, he replaced Moe'min as Commander of the Cikampek V Regiment, Brigade III, Siliwangi Division. As commander, he was assigned to be the Indonesian delegate in the negotiations with the Netherlands in Bekasi on November 29, 1946.

=== Disappearance ===
After attending the Jakarta Defense Command meeting attended by the leaders of the militias in Kedunggede, Bekasi, Koento, along with Adel Sofjan, his guard, and driver disappeared in Warungbambu on the night of 27 November 1946. With his disappearance, the Commander of Regiment V was replaced by Ery Soedewo and the Indonesian delegation for the negotiations with the Netherlands was replaced by Major Sadikin and Major Soedowo.

Rumors emerged that LRDR was involved in Koento's disappearance for two reasons: a territorial conflict between LRDR and Koento and LRDR's disagreement with the negotiations with the Allies. However, LRDR denied its involvement.

== Award ==
To commemorate Koento's services, his name was immortalized on a street name in Karawang and a monument was erected at the exact spot where he disappeared.

== See also ==
- List of people who disappeared mysteriously: 1910–1990
