= Battle of Bojong Kokosan =

Battle of the Indonesian National Revolution

- Part of Indonesian National Revolution
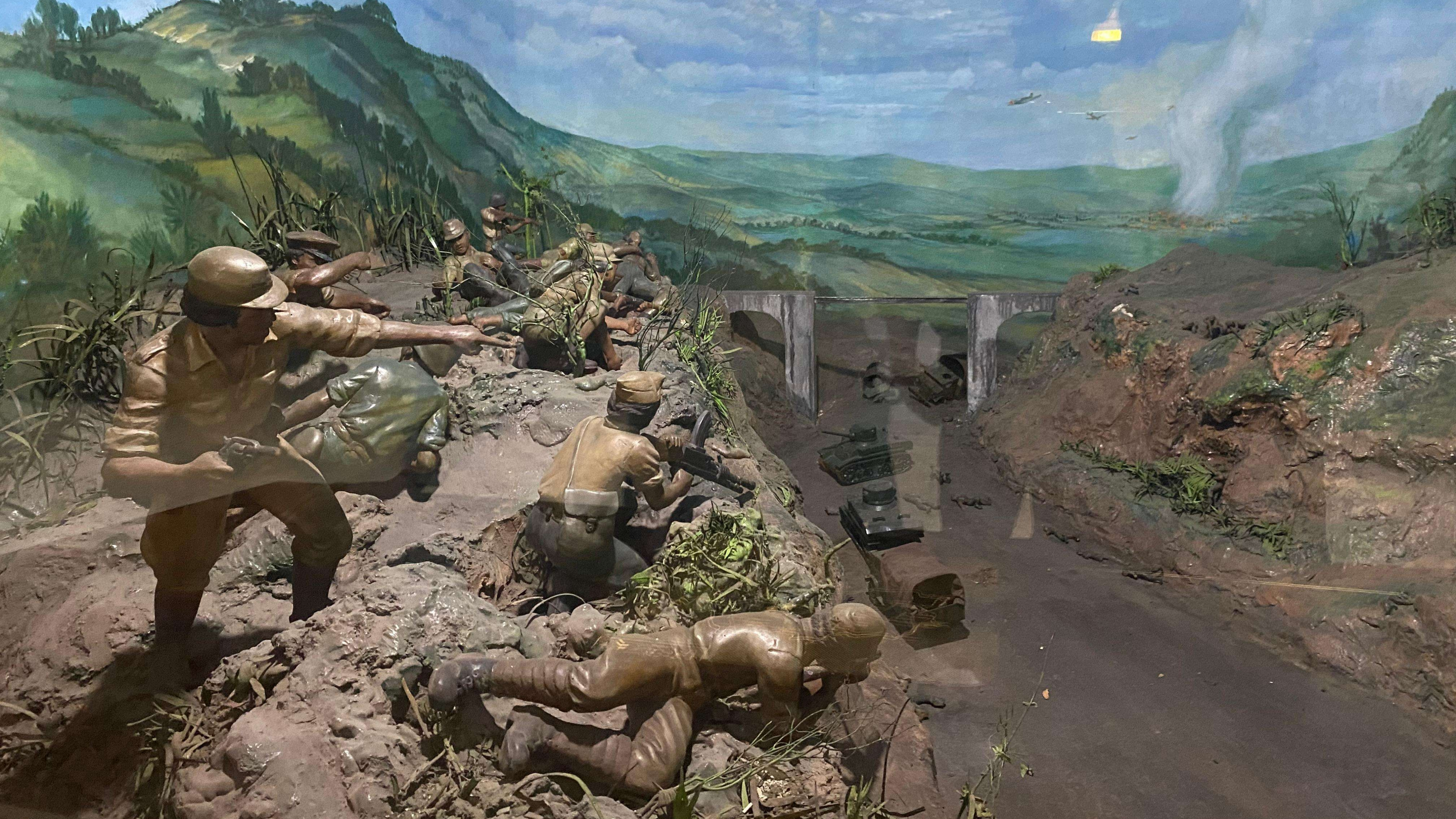
- Diorama showing TKR forces ambushing British soldiers from the edge of a cliff
Date	9–12 December 1945
Location	Bojongkokosan, Sukabumi Regency
Result	Indonesian victory

Belligerents
Indonesia	United Kingdom; Netherlands

Commanders and leaders
(Indonesia) Edi Sukardi	(United Kingdom) AJF Doulton

Units involved
(Indonesia) People's Security Army (TKR); TKR Sukabumi	Royal Air Force; NICA

Strength
Unknown	Thousands of Gurkha troops Dozens of tanks, armoured wagons, steel tanks, mortars, and machine guns.

Casualties and losses
73 killed (Cibadak bombing)	50 killed 100 were seriously injured 30 surrendered
- Hundred of civilians killed or injured. Hundred of houses destroyed.

The Battle of Bojong Kokosan (Indonesian: Pertempuran Bojong Kokosan) was fought on 9-12 December 1945 in the Sukabumi Regency of West Java as a part of the Indonesian National Revolution, when a British army convoy carrying prisoners of war and internees to Bandung was ambushed by local Indonesian freedom fighters near Cicurug. The conflict is considered one of the first instances of de facto recognition of the Republic of Indonesia by the Western Allies, as the convoy's negotiator was able to successfully secure safe passage to Bandung on the 12th.

== Background ==
The battle occurred due to the arrival of Allied troops consisting of British, Gurkha, and NICA as many as one battalion trying to enter Sukabumi. The arrival of the Allied troops in Sukabumi was motivated by three main objectives:
Taking Japanese prisoners in the Sukabumi area and its surroundings; Providing assistance to Bandung where at that time there was unrest between the youth and the Allied forces; Maintaining smooth land connections between Bogor-Sukabumi-Cianjur.

== Battle ==
Battle of Bojong Kokosan began with news received by TKR Sukabumi soldiers at the Cigombong Post about the arrival of British, Gurkha, and NICA soldiers who were trying to enter the Sukabumi area. TKR soldiers immediately blocked and occupied a defensive position on the edge of the north and south cliffs of the road in Bojongkokosan. The blocking carried out by the Sukabumi people and the People's Security Army or TKR led to a fierce battle known as the Battle of Bojong Kokosan. The ranks of fighters involved in the Bojong Kokosan incident were strengthened by weapons seized from the Japanese army. This blocking took place along 81 kilometers. Starting from Cigombong, Sukabumi Regency to Ciranjang, Cianjur Regency

The Allied forces' defense was reinforced with dozens of tanks, armoured wagons, and trucks containing thousands of Gurkha troops. The convoy carried out by the Allied forces managed to enter the TKR defense line. When approaching the Bojongkokosan cliff, the TKR troops immediately opened fire and launched an attack.

Allied troops armed with modern war equipment immediately bombarded the fighters' defenses with steel tanks, mortars, and machine guns. However, the TKR troops managed to escape the Allied attack after heavy rain accompanied by fog poured over the Bojong Kokosan area. The fighting happened again along the road from Bojongkokosan to the border of Cianjur. The battle also extended on the Sukabumi–Cianjur border.

The Allied troops on their way to Bandung were frightened by the attack in Bojongkokosan. Finally, the Allied Commander invited the TKR leader and the local government to negotiate. Represented by the Commander of Regiment III, Lieutenant Colonel Edi Sukardi, the ceasefire proposal was finally approved.

=== Bombing on Cibadak ===
The ceasefire negotiated by the Allied commanders only lasted a day. On 10 December 1945, the Allied forces again bombed the Cibadak District, Sukabumi Regency. The bombing was recorded in the Dutch magazine Fighting Cocks by Doulton. The Allies carried out aerial bombing after learning that dozens of their soldiers had been killed by TKR troops. In the bombing incident, 73 fighters were killed. Some of the names of fighters who died in the battle are recorded on the Monument of Bojong Kokosan. Not only did they killed, the incident also injured hundreds of civilians. Hundreds of houses were destroyed after the Royal Air Force carried out a counterattack. The Allies bombed several villages in Kompa, Sukabumi Regency and Cibadak until they were destroyed and leveled to the ground.

== Commanders ==
Edi Sukardi was an Indonesian lieutenant-colonel who led the batter at Sukabumi on 9 December 1945. The battle was later commemorated in Indonesian as Juang Siliwangi Day. Nephews of Sukardi (Airlangga Hartarto and Laksamana Sukardi) went on to be prominent in Indonesian politics. Sukardi took early retirement from army service in 1957.

== Aftermath ==
This battle resulted in many casualties from both the allies and the TKR. In the first period of battle, not a single TKR soldier was killed. Meanwhile, on the allies' side, 50 people died, 100 were seriously injured, and 30 troops surrendered. In the second period of battle, 73 TKR soldiers were declared dead.

The battle had a major effect on the participation of Allied troops in Indonesia in the eyes of the public. In United Kingdom itself it was discussed in a parliamentary congress where the majority of the public and parliament rejected British further involvement in Indonesia's battle with the Netherlands and respected the wishes of the Indonesian people for independence as had happened in the events of November 10, 1945 in Surabaya one month earlier. This was one of the factors that shortened the presence of British troops in Indonesia.
