= Omar Dhani =

Former Commander in Chief of the Indonesian Air Force

Air Chief Marshal (Ret.) Omar Dhani
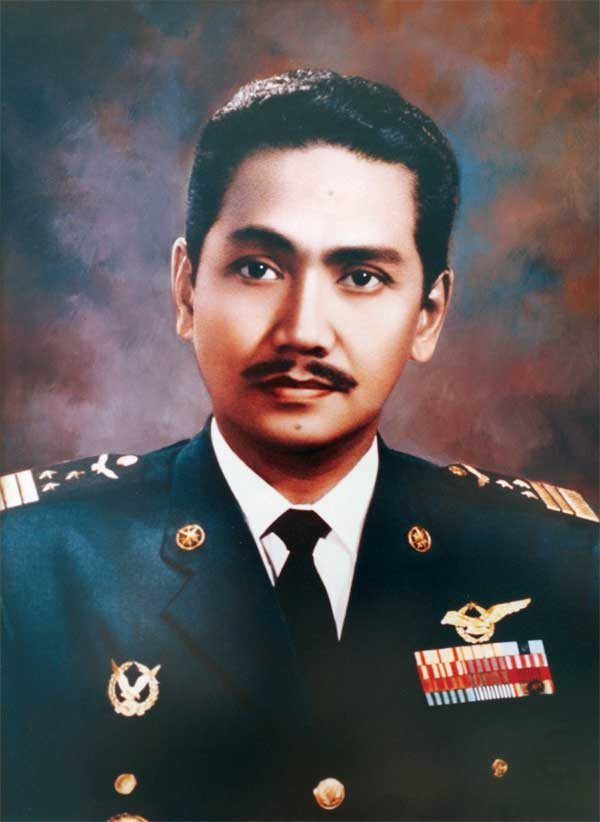

Minister / Commander of the Air Force
- In office 19 January 1962 – 24 November 1965
- President: Sukarno
- Deputy: Leo Wattimena
- Preceded by: Soerjadi Soerjadarma
- Succeeded by: Sri Mulyono Herlambang

Personal details
- Born: 23 January 1924 Surakarta, Dutch Indies
- Died: 24 July 2009 (aged 85) Jakarta, Indonesia
- Spouse: Ny. Sri Wuryanti
- Children: 6
- Profession: Soldier

Military service
- Allegiance: Indonesia
- Branch/service: Indonesian Air Force
- Years of service: 1952–1965
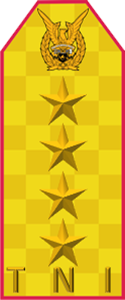
- Rank: Air Chief Marshal
- Unit: Aviation
- Battles/wars: PRRI Rebellion; Permesta Rebellion; Operation Trikora; Indonesia-Malaysia Confrontation

Air Chief Marshal (Ret.) Omar Dhani (23 January 1924 – 24 July 2009) was commander of the Indonesian Air Force (TNI-AU) from 1962 until 1965. He was a leading leftist figure in Indonesia during the Sukarno era.

== Early life and career ==
Dhani first worked on a plantation, then at the government radio station, in the ministry of information, and then in a bank. He enrolled in the Air Force Academy in 1950, and in 1956, attended the Royal Air Force Staff College, Andover in Great Britain. He rose through the ranks to become Minister and Commander of the Air Force in January 1962, succeeded Soerjadi Soerjadarma after the latter was accused of not providing air support during the Battle of Arafura Sea.

He was appointed the commander of the Korps Siaga, later Korps Mandala Siaga (KOLAGA) during the 1963-1965 Indonesia-Malaysia Confrontation, where he commanded three brigades.

== Imprisonment and eventual release ==
His support for Sukarno, and his apparent support for the 30 September Movement in 1965 was his undoing. For example, he had issued comments in support of the movement on the front page of the leftist daily Warta Bhakti. Shortly after the downfall of President Sukarno, he was arrested and sent to prison by the new government led by Suharto.

In 1995, at age 71, he was legally pardoned on the order of Suharto, along with Soebandrio and Sutarto, two other longtime political prisoners. The date of their release was timed to occur the day before the fiftieth anniversary of Indonesian independence. This was apparently a humanitarian gesture aiming to make the Suharto regime open to reform; what those three political prisoners also had in common was that they were never officially members of the Indonesian Communist Party. Nonetheless, the release was insisted upon by Suharto against the wishes of the Armed Forces. Upon his release from jail Dhani became one of the main sources for research into the Air Force's role during the 1965 coup. He died on 24 July 2009, at the age of 85. He is buried at Jeruk Purut Cemetery in South Jakarta.

Military offices
Preceded by Soerjadi Soerjadarma	Chief of the Air Staff (TNI-AU); 1962–1965	Succeeded by Sri Mulyono Herlambang
