= Daan Jahja =

Indonesia politician and military governor of Jakarta

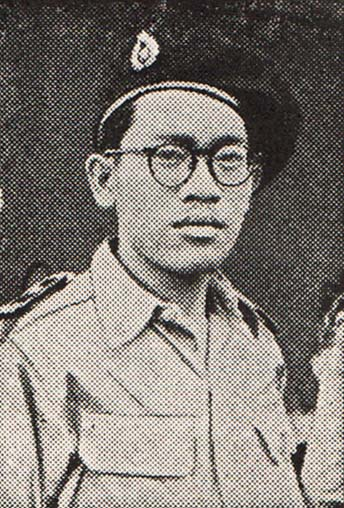

Military Governor of Jakarta
- Caretaker
- In office 16 December 1949 – 17 February 1950
- Preceded by: Suwiryo
- Succeeded by: Suwiryo

Member of People's Representative Council
- In office 1967–1969

Personal details
- Born: 5 January 1925; Padang Panjang, West Sumatra, Dutch East Indies
- Died: 20 June 1985 (aged 60); Jakarta, Indonesia
- Resting place: Kalibata Heroes' Cemetery

Military service
- Allegiance: Indonesia
- Branch/service: Indonesian Army
- Rank: Brigadier General
- Commands: Siliwangi Division

Brig. Gen. Daan Jahja or Daan Yahya (5 January 1925 – 20 June 1985) was an Indonesian military officer who was the Chief of Staff of the Siliwangi Division in 1948 and the Military Governor of Jakarta from 1949 to 1950.

Born from a Minangkabau family, Jahja joined the Indonesian nationalist movement and led the Siliwangi Division during its long march of 1948, being captured in the process. He participated in the Dutch-Indonesian Round Table Conference, and was appointed military governor of Jakarta following his return. He retired as a brigadier general, and died in 1985.

== Early life and education ==
Daan Jahja was born on 5 January 1925 in Padang Panjang, West Sumatra, from a Minangkabau family. His father Jahja Datoek Kajo was a member of the Volksraad and was a strong proponent of Indonesian nationalism. Jahja studied at the Konig Wilhelm III school in Batavia, and later at the Batavia Medical School where he was part of the non-political Unitas Studiosorum Indonesiensis.

During his time at the medical school, Jahja became an admirer of Sutan Sjahrir. He was later expelled from the medical school for leading a student protest.

== Career ==
=== Revolution ===
After the surrender of Japan, Jahja joined a youth group known as the "Prapatan 10" under Sjahrir, which participated in the Rengasdengklok incident of 1945 where both Sukarno and Mohammad Hatta were kidnapped – the Prapatan 10 group was assigned to kidnap Hatta.

Jahja had received training from PETA during the Japanese occupation, and upon its disbandment Jahja was involved in setting up the People's Security Agency (BKR, later TKR). Following an assignment from Oerip Soemohardjo in November 1945, Jahja formed regiments in Tangerang, Bogor and Cikampek. Jahja also led an internal, non-violent coup in the Tangerang Regiment in late April 1946, becoming its next commander. Later on, the regiment was merged with the ones in Sukabumi and Bogor, with Jahja being detached, initially assisting with reorganisation of other units before being assigned command of the 3rd brigade based in Purwakarta. Jahja was again removed from his post following an incident with the irregular militia Laskar Rakyat Djakarta Raya.

Jahja later became the Chief of Staff of the Siliwangi Division, replacing Abdul Harris Nasution. Under his leadership, the Siliwangi division conducted a long march where the division moved from Central to West Java. During the march, Jahja was captured by Dutch forces alongside one of his battalion commanders in late December 1948 – reportedly, because they fell asleep. His capture later resulted in a split of command in the division, as Deputy Commander of the Armed Forces T. B. Simatupang who was present at the long march appointed a different officer to replace him with the one Nasution later appointed. Jahja was interned by the Dutch in Nusa Kambangan.

Prior to his capture, Jahja had pointed out to the Indonesian government in Yogyakarta that Java's small size made guerilla warfare difficult, and recommended that the government prepare a reserve base of operations in Bukittinggi. Mohammad Hatta accepted the proposal, sending some officers – including Jahja – to prepare the contingency plan. Following the 1948 Dutch offensive which resulted in the capture of the Indonesian government, the reserve base was activated and the Emergency Government of the Republic of Indonesia under Sjafruddin Prawiranegara was formed after three days.

During the Dutch-Indonesian Round Table Conference in The Hague, Jahja participated as a member of the Indonesian delegation's military committee. In anticipation for the Dutch transfer of sovereignty following the conference, Jahja, then a lieutenant colonel, was appointed by then Coordinator of National Security Hamengkubuwono IX as Military Governor of Jakarta on 16 December 1949. Captain Raymond Westerling's activities in an attempt to seize power caused significant issues to Jahja during his time as Governor. President of Indonesia Sukarno appointed Suwiryo, Jakarta's first mayor, back to the position on 17 February 1950.

=== Post-war ===
At one point, Jahja became the military attache for the Indonesian embassy in Cairo. Throughout his career in the army, Jahja was often associated with the Socialist Party of Indonesia. According to journalist Rosihan Anwar, Jahja said in 1962 – during Sjahrir's imprisonment – that Sjahrir was not the right man to lead the Socialist Party, which he remarked as "scattered".

Jahja retired from his military position as a Brigadier General. He briefly served in the People's Representative Council between 1967 and 1969, but following the replacement of Sukarno with Suharto, he decided to withdraw from politics. In the 1970s, Jahja was active in organizations of retired army officers who were concerned with the Suharto government.

Although at one point stating that he never identified as being a Minangkabau and instead as an Indonesian, later in his life he developed an interest in Minangkabau adat.

== Death ==
Jahja died on 20 June 1985 from a heart attack after he had just concluded Eid al-Fitr prayers at Sunda Kelapa Mosque in North Jakarta. He was buried at Kalibata Heroes' Cemetery.
