= 3A Japanese propaganda movement =

Propaganda movement made by the Japanese Empire

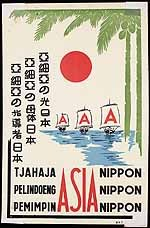
3A Movement Propaganda Poster

The 3A Japanese Propaganda Movement or 3A Movement was a propaganda movement by the Japanese Empire during World War II and their occupation period in Indonesia. The movement was born from the thought of Shimizu Hitoshi, an official at Sendenbu. Sendenbu was the Japanese propaganda department during World War II. The 3A movement is known for its slogan: "Japan - the light of Asia, Japan - the mother of Asia, Japan - the leader of Asia," in Japanese 「亜細亜の光日本、亜細亜の母体日本、亜細亜の指導者日本」, and in Indonesian "Jepang cahaya Asia, Jepang pelindung Asia, Jepang pemimpin Asia."

== Background ==
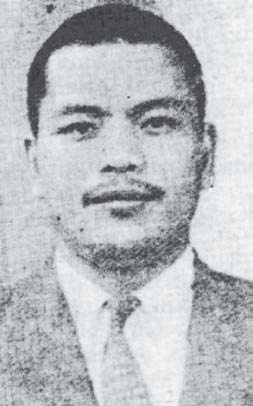
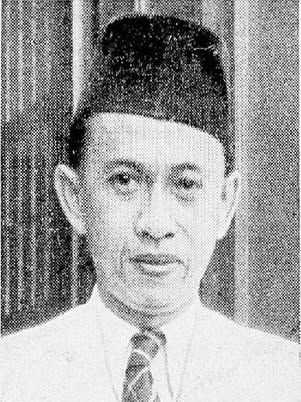
Japanese propagandist Hitoshi Shimizu (left) appointed Samsoeddin (right) to lead the movement.

The arrival of Japan in March 1942 was welcomed by the Indonesian people. Since the arrival of Japan, all political activities were banned and all existing associations were officially dissolved. Japan began to establish new organizations. This ban on political activity was followed by large-scale propaganda campaign in support of the Japanese-sponsored mass movement. The first attempt of a mass movement, the 3A Movement was started in Java. The movement was formed in early April 1942, a few weeks after the arrival of the Japanese. This movement, which clearly "engineered" by the propaganda department prior to the landing, was the first large-scale indication of the direction in which Java was intended to move. The 3A movement includes members from nationalist parties and members of the government without any restrictions. Hitoshi Shimizu then appointed a national figure, Raden Samsoeddin as chairman of the 3A Movement, which aims to gain support from the Indonesian people.

== Divisions ==
The movement covers various fields of education since the education sector meet the target of gathering large numbers of young people. The schools run according to the Japanese education system. In May 1942, the 3A Movement established Pendidikan Pemuda Tiga in Jatinegara. The education system is a crash course and ran for only half a month. The education system was aimed for youth aged 14 to 18 years. Participants of the course must wake up early and do certain activities throughout the day. They practiced some Japanese sports and martial arts, such as sumo and jujutsu. There is a subsection of Islam named Preparation of the Unification of the Islamic Community (Persiapan Persatoean Oemmat Islam). This Islamic subsection is entrusted to Abikusno Tjokrosujoso in July 1942. Since its formation, Islam has been seen as the main way to mobilize Indonesian people. But the subsection did not last long as doubts began to emerge from Japan about its politically active Modernist leader.

== Dismissal ==
In general, the 3A Movement did not achieve its objectives. Indonesian administrators gave it little support, no major Indonesian nationalist was involved in it, and its propaganda was so heavy-handed that even in these early days of the occupation only few Indonesians took it seriously. The movement was also distrusted by many Japanese, and the Kempeitai (a kind of military police) opposed the 3A movement in small towns and villages with violent ways. The Japanese then disbanded the 3A Movement in March 1943 and formed Pusat Tenaga Rakyat (Pusat Tenaga Rakjat, Putera) instead. The 3A movement, which was socialized through the radio and the press, was intended to involve all groups and personalities of the Indonesian nation.
