= R. Soebijakto =

Indonesian military personnel

R. Subyakto
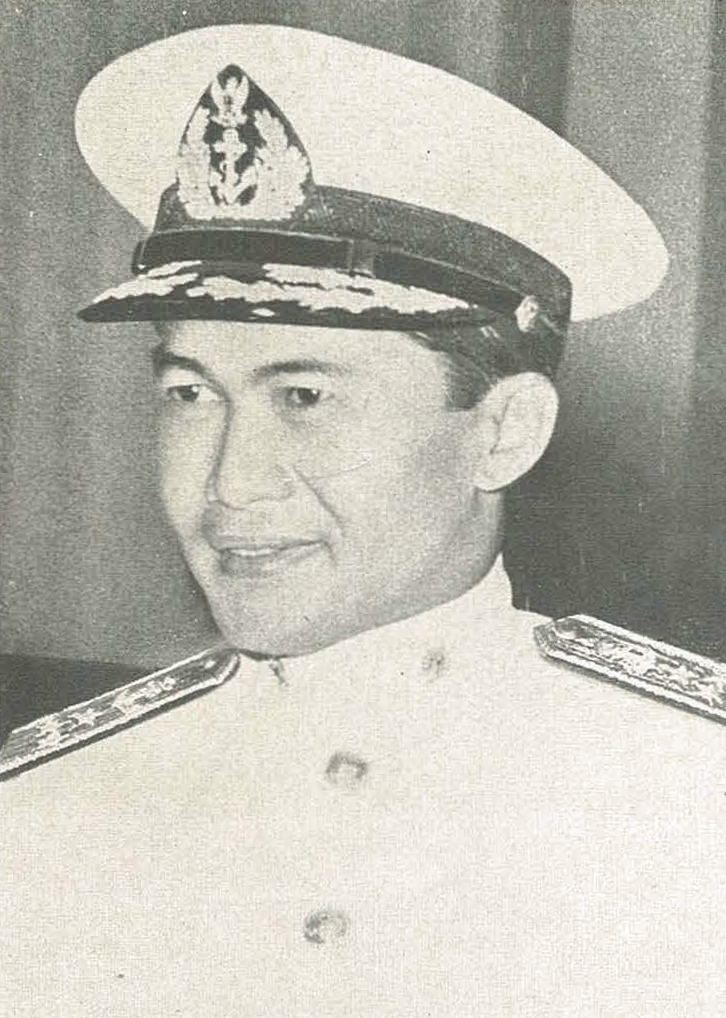

3rd Chief of Staff of the Indonesian Navy
- In office 8 May 1948 – 20 July 1959
- President: Sukarno
- Preceded by: Mohammad Nazir Isa
- Succeeded by: R. E. Martadinata

Personal details
- Born: 14 July 1917 (Netherlands) Banyumas, Dutch East Indies
- Died: 12 August 1999 (aged 82) (Indonesia) Jakarta
- Spouse: Raharti Rachim Soebijakto
- Children: Jay Subiyakto son, Chitra Subiyakto (daughter)
- Profession: Military officer

Military service
- Allegiance: Indonesia
- Branch/service: Indonesian Navy
- Years of service: 1937–1973
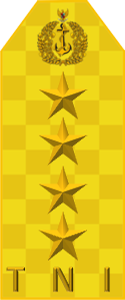
- Rank: Admiral
- Unit: Marine Corps

Admiral Raden Subyakto (14 July 1917 – 12 August 1999) was Chief of Staff of the Indonesian Navy from 1948 to 1959. His appointment was part of a process of reorganization and rationalization of the Indonesian Armed Forces under Prime Minister Mohammad Hatta's policies.

== Profile ==
Raden Subyakto completed his basic education at a Hollandsch-Inlandsche School (HIS) an elementary school for natives in 1930, after that he continued to MULO in 1933, AMS in 1935, and finally at Middled Lands School in 1941 and on 1 April 1941, R. Subyakto started working at the ASP ADJ Viiteru Consultant located in Ambarawa, then on 1 April 1942, he became an Aspirant Reserve of the Royal Netherlands Navy, and lastly 1 March 1943, served as Lieutenant Second Class of Royal Netherlands Navy Reserves, continuing his studies at Koninklijke Marine Institute (K.M) and finished in 1943.

At the beginning of the formation of the Indonesian Navy and the war of Indonesian independence, R. Soebijakto was actively involved because he was Dutch educated at KIM-V and was appointed on May 8, 1948, to serve as Chief of Staff of the Indonesian Navy.

As a personnel with an educational background in the Dutch Navy, on 1 January 1950, R. Subyakto gained the rank of Colonel, four years later, on 1 April 1954, gained the rank of Rear Admiral, he continued to climb the ranks, and on 9 July 1954, he was promoted to Vice Admiral. From 25 November 1955, traveled abroad to Italy, Switzerland, West Germany, Australia, Belgium, France, United Kingdom, Canada, Japan, and the US to learn to build up the Indonesian Navy.

On 17 May 1959, he became a high-ranking officer at the Ministry of Foreign Affairs. On 1 September 1959, he became the Ambassador of the Republic of Indonesia to Turkey in Ankara for approximately 6 years he was transferred on 1 January 1965, and served as the Indonesian ambassador to Yugoslavia in Belgrade until 1 January 1966. On 27 April 1971 he became Admiral of the Indonesia Navy, until his retirement in 1973.

Raden Subyakto died on 12 August 1999, and was later buried at Kalibata Heroes' Cemetery with a military ceremony.
