= Center of the People's Power =

Indonesian Axis collaborationist organization

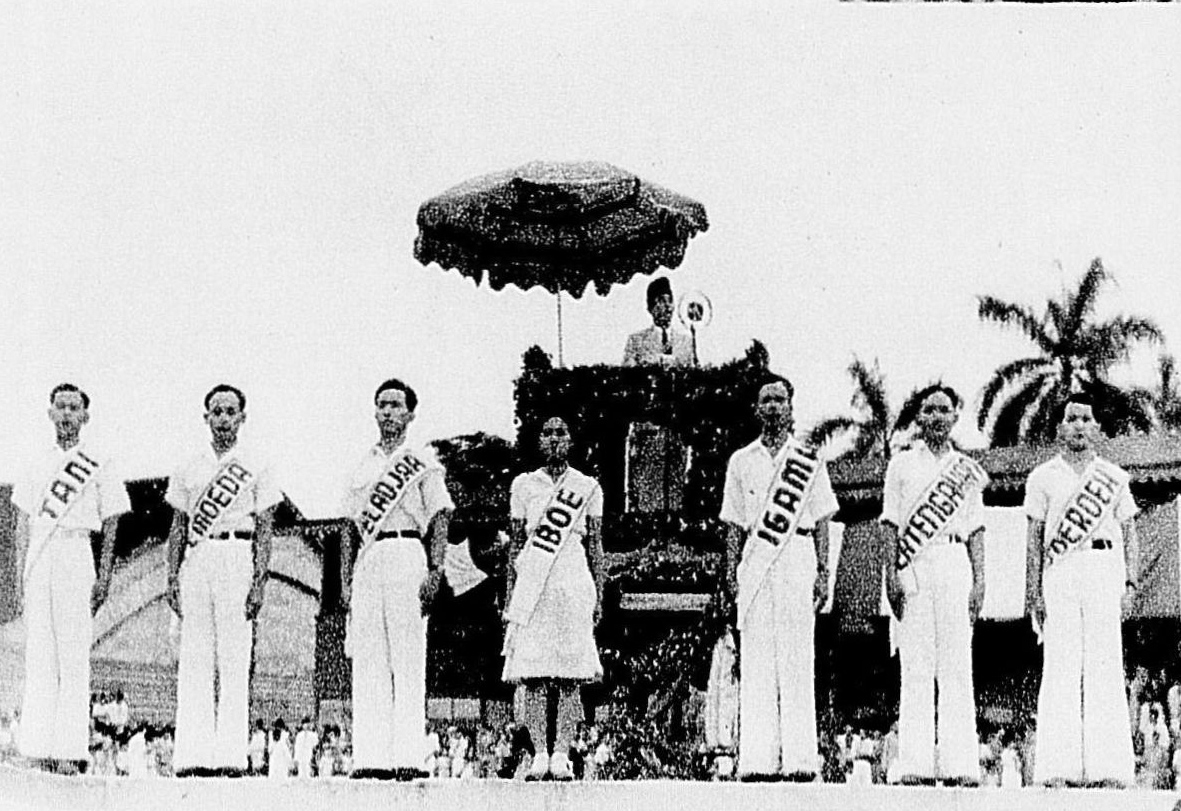
Sukarno (rear) speaking during the establishment of the Center of the People's Power

The Centre of the People's Power (Indonesian: Pusat Tenaga Rakyat, Putera) was a propaganda organization established by the Empire of Japan during their occupation of the Dutch East Indies. This organization was founded in March 1943, as a replacement for the 3A movement which was deemed to have failed to fulfill its objectives. The Putera united all national organizations, both political and non-political organizations to work together to form self-government. Although in the hands of secular nationalists. Putera does not represent any particular group and consists only of individuals. Moreover, Putera is not a mass movement, but only a group of committees located in the city center. This was under tight control from Japan but appointed four major Indonesian figures as leaders, namely Sukarno, Hatta, Ki Hajar Dewantara and Kyai Hajji Mas Mansoer. These four figures are known as the Empat Serangkai (Quadripartite). Putera also has several advisors from the Japanese side. They are S Miyoshi, G Taniguci, Iciro Yamasaki, and Akiyama. This movement is not funded by the Japanese government. However, the nation's leaders were allowed to use Japanese facilities such as newspapers and radio. The establishment of Putera aimed to attract the sympathy of the Indonesian people to help Japan win the war against the Allies. It was urging the Indonesian people to support the Japanese occupation because it had helped liberate Indonesia from protracted colonialism.

== Dismissal ==
But this organization also received little support, as did the 3A Movement, partly because Japan did not support the youth movement. The Putera were not allowed to work in small towns or the countryside. Meanwhile, the situation in the countryside worsened, partly through Japanese army agents working through Indonesian civil servants to solicit rice from farmers to control low prices, and worse still to recruit so-called romusha (literally "labor activists"). Thousands of these forced laborers were sent from Java to the most remote areas of the Japanese occupation, and a large number died in the war. The export of foodstuffs from one residency to another is also prohibited. Japan realized that Putera was more favorable for the Indonesian national movement than Japan's interests. In 1944, Japan disbanded Putera.
