= Cigombong =

- Town and District
- Location in Bogor Regency, Java and Indonesia Cigombong (Java) Cigombong (Indonesia)
- Coordinates: 6°44′36″S 106°48′11″E
- Country: Indonesia
- Province: West Java
- Regency: Bogor Regency

Area
  - Total: 36.59 km^{2} (14.13 sq mi)
- Elevation: 578 m (1,896 ft)

Population (mid 2024 estimate)
  - Total: 105,006
  - Density: 2,870/km^{2} (7,433/sq mi)
- Time zone: UTC+7 (IWST)
- Area code: (+62) 251
- Vehicle registration: F
- Villages: 9
- Website: kecamatancigombong.bogorkab.go.id

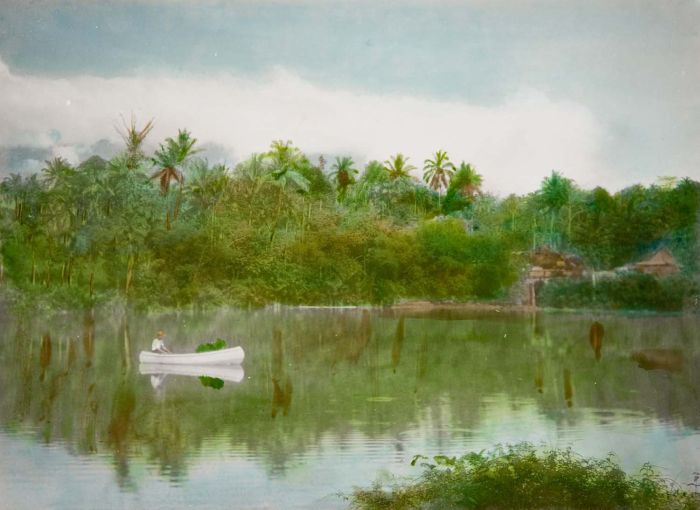
Boat on a lake near Cigombong

Cigombong is a town and an administrative district (Indonesian: kecamatan) in the Bogor Regency, West Java, Indonesia and thus part of Jakarta's larger conurbation; the district is the most southern in the regency and lies a few kilometres south of Bogor city.

Cigombong District covers an area of 36.59 km^{2}, and had a population of 88,309 at the 2010 Census and 97,651 at the 2020 Census; the official estimate as at mid 2024 was 105,006 (comprising 53,849 males and 51,157 females). The administrative centre is at the town of Cigombong, and the district is sub-divided into nine villages (desa), all sharing the postcode of 16110, as listed below with their areas and populations as at mid 2024.

Kode Wilayah	Name of desa	Area in km^{2}	Population mid 2024 estimate
32.01.38.2006	Tugu Jaya	5.05	17,928
32.01.38.2001	Cigombong (town)	1.09	10,965
32.01.38.2002	Watesjaya	10.13	8,741
32.01.38.2004	Srogol	1.32	7,657
32.01.38.2003	Ciburuy	2.34	13,542
32.01.38.2005	Cisalada	1.68	8,311
32.01.38.2007	Pasirjaya	7.99	9,009
32.01.38.2008	Ciburayut	3.84	15,480
32.01.38.2009	Ciadeg	3.15	13,373
32.01.38	Totals	36.59	105,006
