= Mohammad Nazir Isa =

Indonesian Naval officer

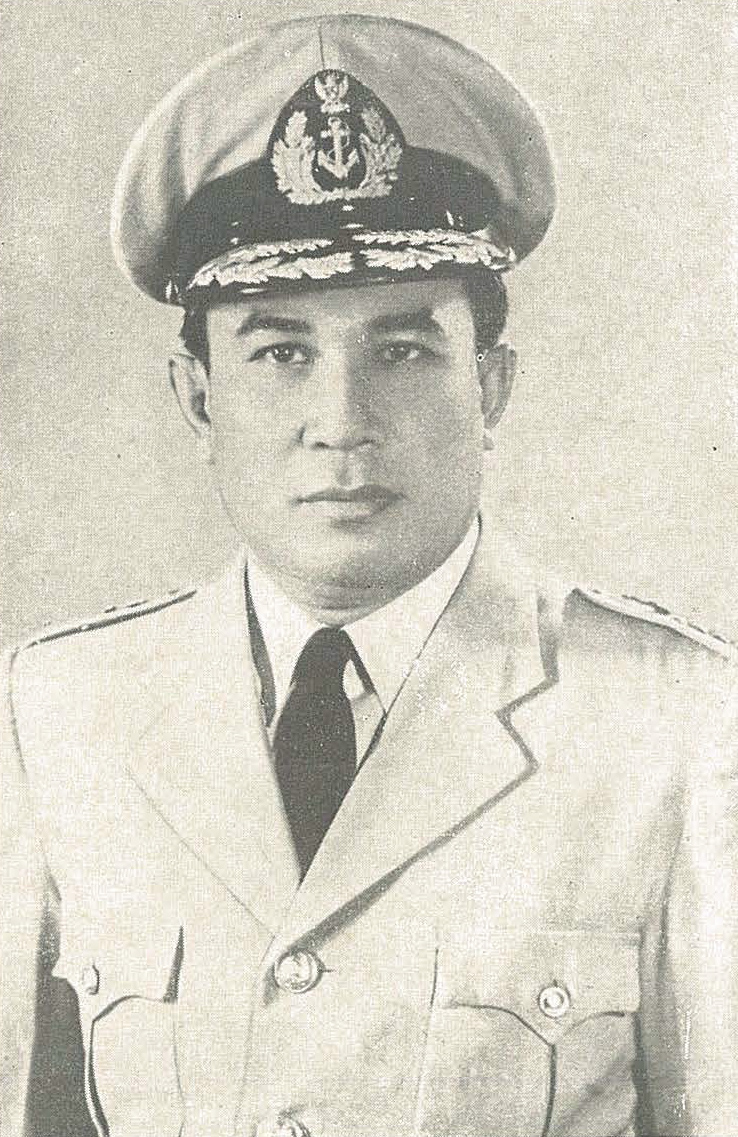

2nd Commander of the Indonesian Navy
- In office 6 February 1946 – 8 May 1948
- President: Sukarno
- Preceded by: Mas Pardi
- Succeeded by: R. Soebijakto

11th Indonesian Minister of Sea Transportation
- In office 9 April 1957 – 10 July 1959 Serving with Sukardan
- President: Sukarno
- Preceded by: Sjuchjar Tedjasukmana
- Succeeded by: Djatikuso; Abdoelmoettalip Danoeningrat; R. Iskandar

Personal details
- Born: 10 July 1910 Maninjau, Agam, Dutch East Indies
- Died: 30 August 1982 (aged 72) Jakarta, Indonesia
- Profession: Soldier

Military service
- Allegiance: Indonesia
- Branch/service: Indonesian Navy
- Years of service: 1938–1965
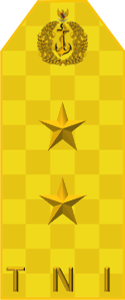
- Rank: Rear Admiral
- Unit: Marine Corps

Rear Admiral Mohammad Nazir Isa (10 July 1910 – 30 August 1982) was an Indonesian military officer, minister, and diplomat. He served as Chief of Staff of the Indonesian Navy from 1946 to 1948, Minister of Shipping from 1957 to 1959, and Indonesian Ambassador to Switzerland and the Vatican.

== Profile ==
=== Early life and education ===
Nazir was born in Maninjau, Agam, West Sumatra, to Mohammad Isa Sutan Bandaro and Siti Chadijah, the third of seven children. From the age of six, Nazir was raised by his uncle, Adam Datuak Basa Nan Balimo, who served as a School Opzienner in Tanjung Pura, Langkat. In accordance with his uncle's position, Nazir was allowed to enter the Europeesche Lagere School in Medan. After that he was brought by another uncle, Abdul Samad who worked as a Hoof Opzichter in Batavia, and entered the primary school De Tweede Bijbel School, then he continued his education at Chrijstelike Meer Uitgebreid Lager Onderwijs (MULO).

=== Naval career ===
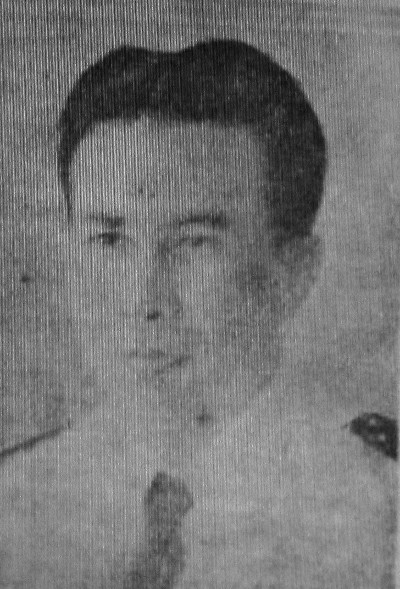
Mohammad Nazir Isa as Chief of Staff of the Indonesian Navy in 1947

Nazir worked as a sailor in the Netherlands on the recommendation of Mrs. Poijt van Druten, his teacher at MULO. After working in the shipping industry, Nazir had saved up enough money to continue his education at the Michel Adrianzoon de Ruyter Dutch shipping school, and received a De Grotevaart diploma (Ocean Cruise Certificate) in 1938, He was the first Indonesian to receive the degree. In 1938 he returned to Indonesia and worked for the shipping company, Doggerbank. After the Japanese occupation of the Dutch East Indies, he joined the Imperial Japanese Navy. In 1943, he was appointed head of the Higher Shipping School in Semarang.

After Indonesia's deceleration of independence, he and other navy captains convened to form the People's Security Agency Navy, where he became Deputy Commander, with the reorganization of the Indonesian navy he, became Chief of Staff of the Indonesian Navy with the position of Chief of General Staff of TRI Laut on 6 February 1946 and the position changed its name to Commander of the Indonesian Navy from 19 July 1946 to 8 May. On 2 January 1948 he was reassigned to Sumatra and established a navy training school.

During 1948 he became a senior adviser to Sjafruddin Prawiranegara's Emergency Government of the Republic of Indonesia and Minister of Shipping in the Djuanda Cabinet. He later signed the Petition of Fifty which criticized Suharto's totalitarian government.

=== Death ===
Nazir died in Jakarta on 30 August 1982 at the age of 72 and was buried in Tanah Kusir TPU, South Jakarta.
