= Mas Pardi =

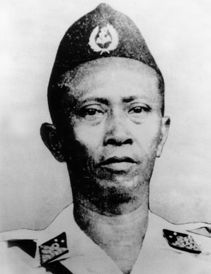

1st Chief of General Staff of Marine TKR
- In office 1945–1946
- President: Sukarno
- Succeeded by: Mohammad Nazir Isa

Personal details
- Born: 1 October 1901 (Netherlands) Ambarawa, Central Java, Dutch East Indies
- Died: 13 August 1968 (aged 66) Semarang, Central Java, Indonesia

Military service
- Allegiance: Indonesia
- Branch/service: Indonesian navy
- Years of service: 1945–1957
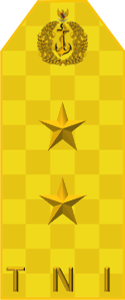
- Rank: Rear admiral
- Unit: Marine Corps
- Battles/wars: Indonesian National Revolution

Rear Admiral Mas Pardi (1 October 1901 – 13 August 1968) was the founder and leader of the central People's Security Agency Marines, which was the forerunner of the Indonesian Navy. Mas Pardi is known as the "Father of Indonesian Shipping" by establishing maritime schools. On 10 September 1945, the marine BKR was renamed to TKR Laut. Mas Pardi was the Chief of the Marine TKR General Staff. He is the namesake of buildings at the Semarang Merchant Marine Polytechnic and the Indonesian Naval Academy.

== Early life ==
Mas Pardi was born in Ambarawa, Central Java, in 1901, studying at a Hollandsch-Inlandsche School until 1916 and continued to a Meer Uitgebreid Lager Onderwijs until 1920. In 1922 he entered a Zeevaartschool (Marine Academy).

After graduating in 1923, he joined the Government Navy, a Dutch naval unit tasked with policing and transport, on the survey ship SS Orion, with the rank of Officer First Class, he was transferred to the ship SS Fomalhaut in the year 1936.

== Japanese occupation period ==
During the Japanese occupation of the Dutch East Indies, Mas Pardi, a Senior Sailor among the native Pribumi, Continuing his career at the Higher Shipping School (SPT) which was formed by the Imperial Japanese Navy, now the Semarang Shipping Science Polytechnic.

Mas Pardi was active as an instructor for young sailors at the school. On the eve of the Proclamation of Indonesian Independence on 17 August 1945, Mas Pardi and a line of Indonesian sailors and mariners, escorted the reading of the text of the Proclamation on Jl. East Pegangsaan No. 56 with the Pioneer Front.

On 10 September 1945, Mas Pardi regrouped Indonesian sailors who were scattered into the BKR Laut. The agency was later transformed into the TKR Marine and during the Indonesian Revolution, participated in combat against the Dutch forces both at sea and on land in various parts of Indonesia.

== Independent Indonesia ==
After completing the organization of the TKR Marine, Mas Pardi, who was among the elders, was replaced by Mohammad Nazir Isa as the head of the marine defense agency in 1948. Mas Pardi was active in seafaring education and worked in the shipping service in Yogyakarta. After the recognition of sovereignty, the Indonesian government worked on improving the structure of the nation state, including in the Navy, with the establishment of IAL – Institute of the Navy (now the Indonesian Naval Academy) in 1953.

In 1958 he was one of the Indonesian delegates during the creation of the United Nations Convention on the Law of the Sea, in Geneva, Switzerland, 1958.

== Death ==
Mas Pardi died at the SPM Polyclinic in Semarang, Central Java, at the age of 66 years, on Tuesday, 13 August 1968, at 18.45 WIB. His grave was moved to the Giri Tunggal Heroes Cemetery, Semarang, Central Java in 2012.
