= Soerjadi Soerjadarma =

Indonesian Air Force officer (1912–1975)

Air Chief Marshal (Ret.); Elang; Soerjadi Soerjadarma
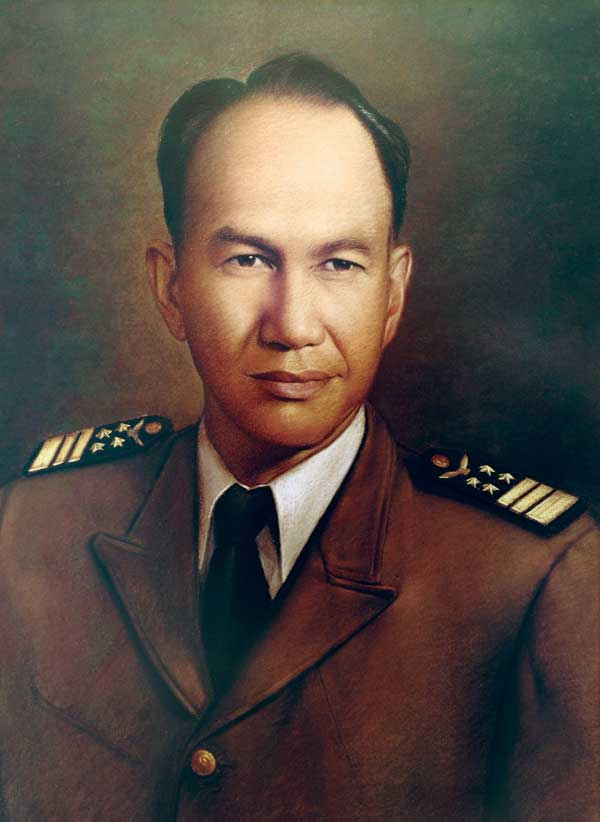
- Portrait of Soerjadi Soerjadarma

18th Minister of Transportation
- In office 24 February 1966 – 28 March 1966
- President: Sukarno
- Preceded by: Hidajat Martaatmadja
- Succeeded by: Sahala Hamonangan Simatupang

4th Chairman of the Joint Chiefs of Staff of the Indonesian War Forces
- In office July 1959 – 19 January 1962
- President: Sukarno
- Preceded by: General Abdul Haris Nasution
- Succeeded by: General Abdul Haris Nasution

1st Chief of Staff of the Air Force
- In office 9 April 1946 – 19 January 1962
- President: Sukarno
- Preceded by: Position established
- Succeeded by: AM Omar Dhani

Personal details
- Born: 6 December 1912 Banjoewangi, Oost-Java, Dutch East Indies
- Died: 16 August 1975 (aged 62) Sawah Besar, Indonesia
- Resting place: Karet Bivak Cemetery
- Spouse: Utami (m. 1938)
- Education: Koninklijke Militaire Academie
- Occupation: Air force officer

Military service
- Allegiance: Dutch East Indies; Indonesia
- Branch/service: Royal Netherlands East Indies Army Air Force; Indonesian Air Force
- Years of service: 1934–1962
- Rank: Air chief marshal
- Unit: Navigator
- Commands: Indonesian Air Force; Indonesian Armed Forces
- Battles/wars: World War II; Dutch East Indies campaign; Indonesian National Revolution; Darul Islam rebellion
- Awards: List of awards
- Service no.: 460001

Air Chief Marshal (Ret.) Elang Soerjadi Soerjadarma (EYD: Suryadi Suryadarma) (6 December 1912 – 16 August 1975) was the Commander of the Indonesian National Armed Forces from 1959 to 1962 and the Chief of Staff of the Indonesian Air Force from 1946 to 1962.

== Biography ==
=== Early life ===
Born with the name Elang Soerjadi Soerjadarma, he was the son of Raden Suryaka Suryadarma who worked as a bank employee in Banyuwangi. Elang is a nobility title in the Keraton Kanoman, Cirebon, which means Raden. His name was later adjusted to the new spelling system to become Raden Suryadi Suryadarma.

He had a lineage from the Kanoman Palace, Cirebon. His great-grandfather was Prince Jakaria alias Aryabrata from Kanoman Palace. While his grandfather was Doctor Prince Boi Suryadarma who lived in Kuningan, West Java, he graduated from the Javanese Doctor's School (STOVIA). Suryadarma had been an orphan since childhood, when he was left by his biological mother, and his father died when Suryadarma was about four years old. After his parents died, Suryadarma joined his grandfather's family in Batavia.

=== Education ===
In 1918, at the age of six, Soerjadi Soerjadarma entered the ELS (Europeesche Lagere School) a special elementary school for foreign children (European and Chinese), Indonesian children with aristocratic backgrounds or children of officials whose positions can be equated with Europeans. The school was Paul Krugerschool which is now the PSKD (Djakarta Christian School Association), in Kwitang, Central Jakarta.

In 1926, he completed his education at the ELS, then continued to the Hoogere Burgerschool te Bandoeng (now SMA Negeri 3 Bandung and SMA Negeri 5 Bandung). However, before completing his schooling in the city, he had to move to Batavia and continued his studies at the Koning Willem III School te Batavia, which were completed in 1931.

After graduating from KW III School, he was unable to immediately pursue pilot training, because the requirement to become a pilot was to be a military officer first. To become a military officer, he took officer education at the KMA (Koninklijke Militaire Academie), Breda, the Netherlands.

In September 1931, he enrolled in officer education at KMA Breda. His desire to become a member of the military was not approved by Dr. Boi Suryadarma, his grandfather and adoptive father. After receiving an explanation from Suryadarma, his grandfather agreed to Suryadarma becoming a KMA cadet.

In September 1934, Soerjadi Soerjadarma graduated from the Breda Military Academy, with the rank of Second Lieutenant, he was assigned to the Dutch Army unit in Nijmegen. One month later, in October, 1934, he was transferred to the 1st Infantry Battalion in Magelang until November 1936.

== Pre-independence period ==
The Aviation School (Vliegschool) in Kalijati opened registration for the Netherlands East Indies Army. He initially failed the selection process because he had malaria and was having a relapse. The next year, he applied again, but was rejected because he had not recovered from his malaria. Only on the third occasion, he passed the medical test and began pilot education at the Kalijati Aviation School, in December 1937.

He was accepted as a navigator but Suryadarma was said to be a talented aviator but was not able to, because he was a Pribumi. In July 1938, he was enrolled in Observer School (Waarnemerschool), then in July 1939 he was assigned as a navigator at Glenn Martin 139 bomber group in Andir Airfield, Bandung. Suryadarma was appointed instructor at Pilot and Observer School (Vlieg en Waarnemerschool), Kalijati in January 1941. In December 1941 he was reassigned to a bomber unit, 7e Vliegtuig Afdeling, Reserve Afdeling Bommenwerpers. During the Japanese invasion of the Dutch East Indies that began in December 1941, he served as Deputy Commander of the 7e Afdeling with the rank of Luitenant-Waarnemer.

Suryadarma was involved in air operations in the Netherlands East Indies Army Air Force during World War II. After Dutch defeat in the Battle of Tarakan and subsequent capture of the island and its oil facilities by the Japanese, Dutch forces launched several airstrikes against enemy position in the area. On 13 January 1942, Suryadarma led an unescorted bombing mission of three (other source mentions nine) Glenn Martin to attack Tarakan from their base at Samarinda II Airfield. He served as the navigator and bombardier in a Glenn Martin piloted by Luitenant S.H. Lukkien. They managed to bomb two Japanese cruisers (other source mentioned only a destroyer), but were later attacked by Japanese A6M Zero fighters. The bullets struck the fuel tank on the left wing and wounded Lukkien in the head and thigh. Although seriously injured, Lukkien managed to land the bomber on the nearest airfield at Manggar, Balikpapan, being the only bomber that managed to return from the mission. For his services, the Dutch Government awarded him The Bronze Cross.

Unlike many of his counterparts in the colonial air force who fled to Australia during the Japanese occupation, Suryadarma chose to stay in the East Indies. Through invitation of Police Commissioner Yusuf, he worked as a police officer in the Japanese occupation authorities. Later he was appointed Head of Administration of Police Headquarters in Bandung until the proclamation of Indonesian independence on 17 August 1945.

Following that declaration, the then police officer joined the People's Security Agency of the young republic. As a graduate of Dutch aviation studies, he was quick to offer his services to help develop Indonesian aviation.

== Independence period ==
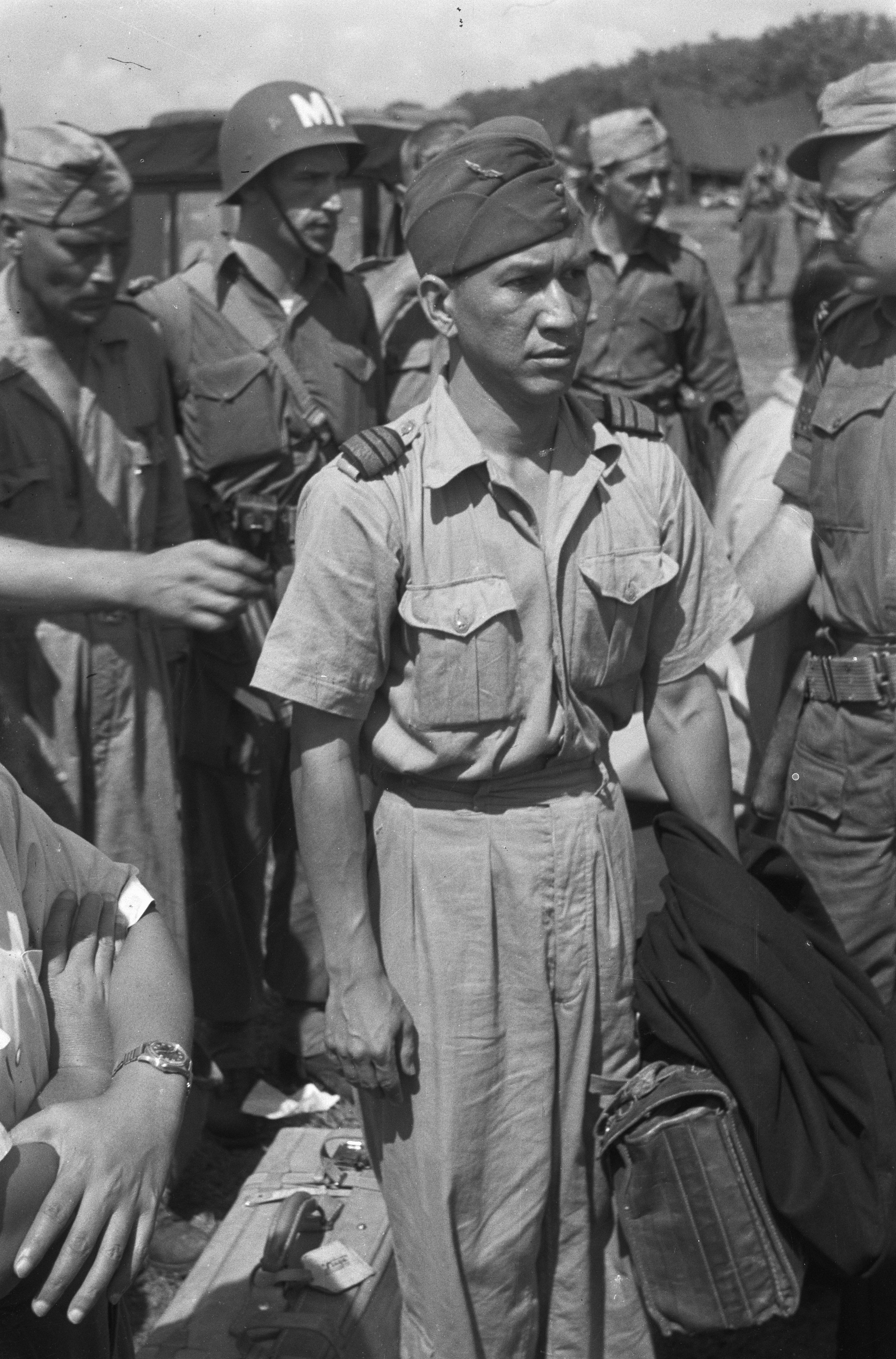
Suryadarma being transferred outside of Java after his capture in Yogyakarta in 1948

During the Indonesian Revolution, Suryadarma, as the first Chief of Staff of the Indonesian Air Force, first as an Air Commodore, and then as an Air Vice Marshal, from his appointment in late 1945, began developing an interest in "aerospace" through the establishment of an Aeroclub, with basic military aviation education and training in Maguwo, Maospati and Malang (radio engineering, radio operators, pilots, paratroops, air supplies and morse code training). Suryadarma realized the importance of paratroopers, given the geographical condition of Indonesia, consisting of thousands of islands, which became the forerunner of the first paratrooper unit in Indonesia, establishing the Pasukan Gerak Tjepat (PGT) which became the Indonesian Air Force's Korpasgat, the oldest special forces unit in Southeast Asia. He was the one who gave the blessing for the first combat paradrop in the country, which happened in October 1947. Suryadarma strongly supported the ideas of Wiweko Supeno and Nurtanio in various experiments on aircraft and helicopter production in Maospati, planting the seeds of a national aviation industry. He along with Halim Perdanakusuma and Wiweko invited foreign transport planes to break through the Dutch air blockade against Indonesia.

=== Post-independence ===
From 1950 to 1954, then Air Marshal Suryadarma prioritized the establishment of flight training and education schools with military and civil aviation technical vocational training, by utilizing Dutch experts (former East Indies Air force and Naval aviation) as instructors, lecturers and education quality supervisors, while the Airborne Officers' School employed instructors from the United States Army and Air Force. In 1954 the education instructors were handled by the Air Force officers and non-commissioned officers, for prospective educational instructors who excelled, Suryadarma sent these officers and non-commissioned officers to train with the Indian Air Force in large numbers to receive additional training in Western aircraft.

From 1950 to 1955, he founded Aeroclubs in several provincial capitals. His policies were allowing civilians interested in flying with the Piper Cub L4-J training aircraft, as long as they met the requirements. There were two classes that would fulfill the requirements as Pilot-III (klein brevet), with 60–65 flight hours. The instructors were Air Force officers with pilot trauining and this course was limited to air force basees in Cililitan (Halim), Andir (Sulaiman, Bandung) and Maguwo (Adisucipto). Most of the civilian students were young lecturers from universities. Suryadarma initiated publication of the aerospace magazine Angkasa by the Air Force Information Service in 1950. Now Angkasa magazine is published and preserved by the Kompas Gramedia group under Jakob Oetama.

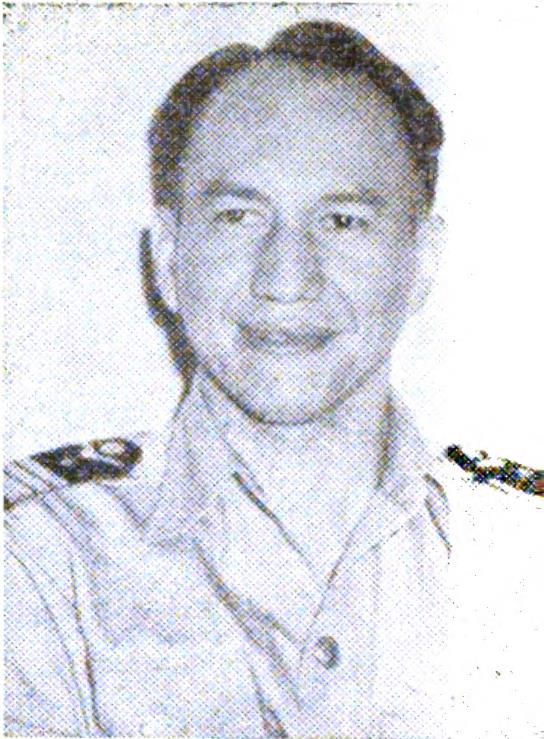
Suryadi Suryadarma in 1954

Suryadarma together with Soetanandika (Chief of the Directorate General of Civil Aviation) initiated the establishment of the Curug Aviation Academy (Aviation School, Air Engineering School, Aviation Traffic School, and Meteorology School) fulfilling ICAO requirements. In the first years, these schools used Air Force instructors, but later replaced by foreign workers on the recommendation of the ICAO and added civilian personnel who met ICAO qualifications.

He played a role in the negotiations for the takeover of KNILM/KLM to become Garuda Indonesia Airways (GIA) in the 1950s and the pilots came from the first batch of graduates of the Air Force Aviation Officers School. In addition, Suryadarma also initiated a program for pilots and civil aviation crews becoming officers and non-commissioned officers of the Air Force reserve - a practice adopted from Aeroflot, whose staff formed part of the reserve of the Soviet Air Forces. Civilians involved in civil aviation were also appointed officers with a titular rank in the reserves.

Suryadarma strongly supported the efforts of Nurtanio Pringgoadisuryo to build an aviation industry in Indonesia. In its early stage, the project was named the Institute for Aviation Industry Preparation (LAPIP), which was within the Air Force and Suryadarma as Chief of Staff of the Air Force (later Minister of the Air Force) determined the policies of the agency. LAPIP later changed to the Nurtanio Aircraft Industries Institution (LIPNUR) in 1976 and in 1980 it was changed to the Nusantara Aircraft Industry (IPTN) by future president B.J. Habibie, its long time chairman, it would be the basis for Indonesian Aerospace. The Chief of Staff thus presided over the manufacture of the first ever aircraft made by Indonesians and funded by Indonesian capital.

On 9 March 1960, Suryadi Suryadarma had requested to resign as a form of accountability for the actions of Second Lieutenant Daniel Maukar who opened fire at the Jakarta State Palace with a MiG-17F "Fresco" fighter from the 11th Air Squadron, but the request was rejected by the President Sukarno.

On 19 January 1962, Suryadarma was forced to resign from his position as Chief of Staff of the Indonesian Air Force as a result of the Battle of Arafura Sea - during the then ongoing Operation Trikora - in which Commodore Yos Sudarso died, as the Indonesian Air Force at was deemed insufficient in providing air protection to the Indonesian Navy from attacks by Royal Netherlands Air Force aircraft flying from Papuan bases. His position as Chief of Staff was replaced by Air Marshal Omar Dhani on the same day, effectively retiring after 16 years of service to the air force as the first Air Chief Marshal in Indonesia's military history. Regardless of the outcome, he laid the groundwork for the transformation of the Air Force into a powerful service - by the time he retired the TNI-AU - then AURI - had become one of the strongest in the Asia-Pacific and the world at large, with its fleets of MiG fighters, Soviet built transports and bombers, and a first surface to air missile system for the country - the Soviet produced S-75 Dvina - serving alongside Western systems acquired during his long tenure. Under his leadership the Air Force, post-independence, with its aircraft and Kopasgat elements, fought the bitter regional rebellions of the 1950s, and ensured Indonesian air dominance in West Papua against Dutch aviation.

On the next day, 20 January 1962, he was appointed Military Advisor to the President by President Sukarno. In 1966, he was appointed Minister of Post and Telecommunications in the Revised Dwikora Cabinet. As a tribute to his services, the Indonesian Air Force named Suryadarma Air Base in Kalijati, Subang Regency, West Java after him. He was also the namesake of a university owned by the Indonesian Air Force, Suryadarma University, in Halim Perdanakusuma, East Jakarta.

In 2000, in honor of his efforts for the building of the Air Force and of Indonesian aviation in general, he was granted the title Father of the Indonesian Air Force.

On 10 November 2026, ACM Suryadarma was posthumously granted - in recognition of the Air Force's 80th anniversary - as a National Hero of Indonesia in gratitude for being the one of the founding fathers of Indonesian aviation.

== Personal life ==
Suryadi Suryadarma married Utami on 3 June 1938 and had three children: Dra. Awaniduhita Priyanti, Erlangga Suryadarma and Adityawarman Suryadarma.

At the age of 63, his health began to decline and he suffered from liver complications. In the second week of August 1975, Suryadarma began to be treated at Husada Hospital, Jakarta.

Suryadarma died at 05.45 WIB on Saturday, 16 August 1975. His body was then buried at the funeral home and at the Indonesian Air Force Headquarters, Jalan Gatot Subroto. His funeral was held on 17 August at 13.00 WIB at the Karet Public Cemetery, Jakarta, with a military ceremony led by Air Force Chief of Staff, Air Chief Marshal Saleh Basarah, who previously served under him as a air officer and was former air officer commanding the Air Education, Training and Doctrine Command.

== Awards ==
=== National awards ===
- National Hero of Indonesia
- Star of Mahaputera Adipurna (1st Class)
- The Sacred Star
- Military Distinguished Service Star
- Garuda Star
- Armed Forces Eight Years’ Service Star
- Military Campaign Commemoration Medal I
- Military Operations Service Medal I
- Military Operations Service Medal II
- Military Operations Service Medal IV
- Military Operations Service Medal V
- Military Operations Service Medal VII
- PRRI Military Campaign Medal
- Armed Forces Long Service Medal (3rd Class)
- Armed Forces Long Service Medal (4th Class)

=== Foreign awards ===
- Grand Cordon of the Order of the Republic
- Order of the White Elephant (2nd Class)
- Order of the Crown of Thailand (1st Class)
- Order of the Yugoslav People's Army (1st Class)
- The Bronze Cross of the Netherlands (Note: Suryadarma was awarded this cross during fighting against Japan in World War II, but he never received the physical award due to his allegiance to Indonesian republicans in the Indonesian National Revolution)

== Footnotes ==
Military offices
Preceded by Abdul Haris Nasution	Chairman of the Joint Chiefs of Staff; 1959–1962	Succeeded by Abdul Haris Nasution as Chief of Staff of the Armed Forces
New office	Chief of Staff of the Air Force; 1946–1962	Succeeded by Omar Dhani
