= People's Security Army =

Forerunner of the Indonesian National Armed Forces

- Tentara Keamanan Rakyat
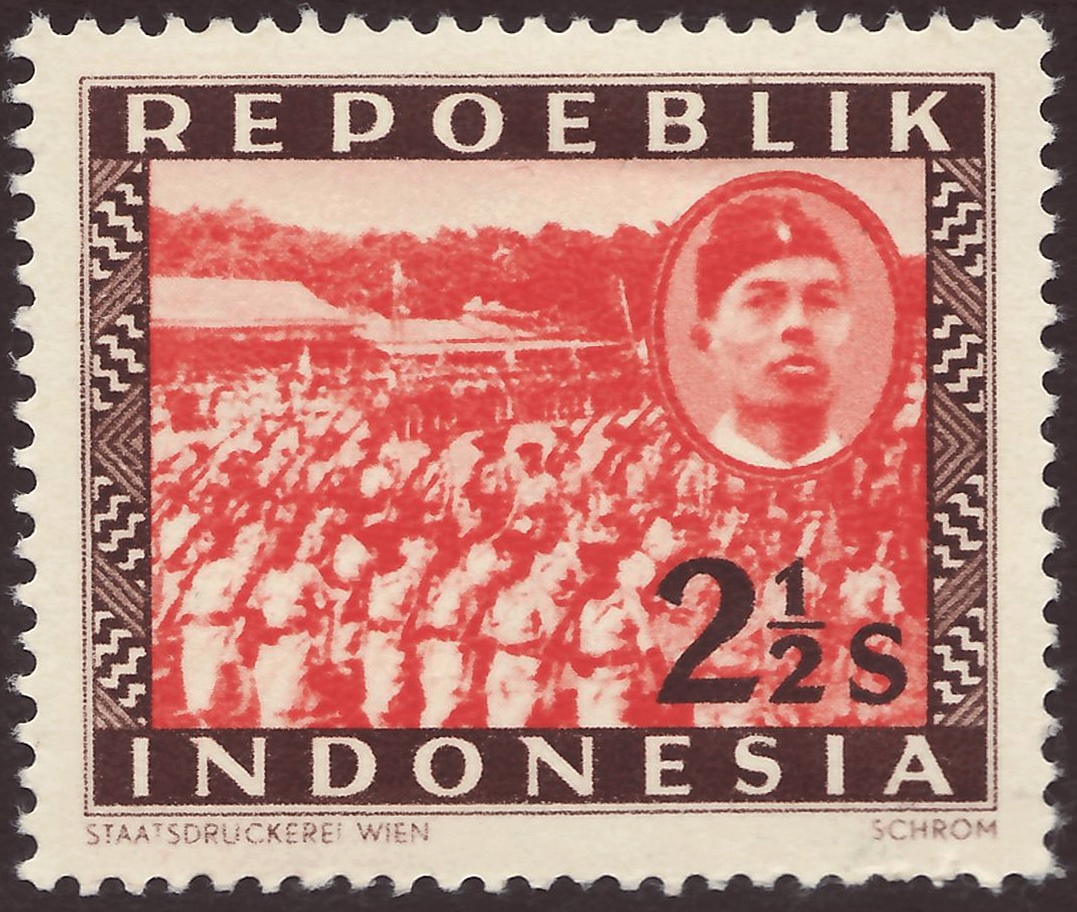
- Indonesian 1948 regional stamp with drawing of TKR troops
- Founded: 5 October 1945 (formerly called the People's Security Agency which was formed from former KNIL and PETA)
- Current form: Indonesian National Armed Forces
- Disbanded: 26 January 1946
- Headquarters: Yogyakarta

Leadership
- Minister of Defense: Amir Sjarifoeddin
- Commander: General Soedirman

Related articles
- History: Indonesian National Revolution; Battle of Semarang; Battle of Surabaya; Battle of Ambarawa; Battle of Bojong Kokosan
- Ranks: Rank of the People's Security Army

The People's Security Army (Indonesian: Tentara Keamanan Rakyat) or commonly abbreviated as TKR is the name of the first military force formed by the Indonesian Government, after the Proclamation of Indonesian Independence. TKR was formed on October 5, 1945, based on an announcement issued by the Government of the Republic of Indonesia. TKR was formed as a result of improving the function of the previously existing People's Security Agency (BKR) and its core army was taken from the former KNIL & PETA.

The formation of this army was aimed at overcoming a situation that was starting to become unsafe, due to the return of Allied troops to Indonesia after Japan surrendered unconditionally to the allies.

TKR consisted of TKR Land, TKR Sea and TKR Aviation Bureau, all of which originated from changes to BKR Land, BKR Sea and BKR Air.

To expand the function of the army in defending independence and safeguarding the security of the Indonesian people, the Indonesian government then changed the name of the People's Security Army to People’s Safety Army (Indonesian: Tentara Keselamatan Rakyat) on 7 January 1946. The TKR would later be renamed as Republic of Indonesia Army (Indonesian: Tentara Republik Indonesia) on 26 January 1946.

== Background ==
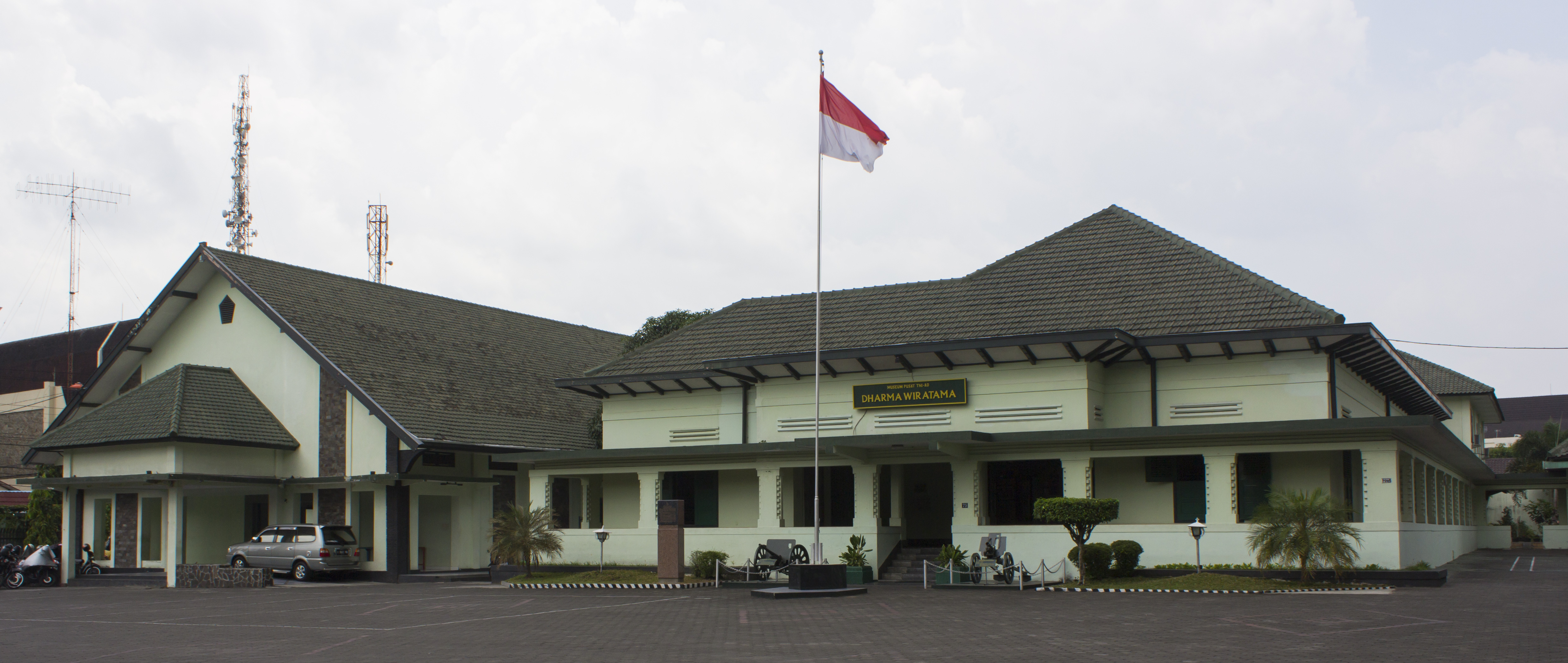
The first dedicated TKR headquarters, located in Gondokusuman, Yogyakarta; it is now the Dharma Wiratama Museum.

On 19 August 1945 in the PPKI session, two PPKI members Abikoesno Tjokrosoejoso and Oto Iskandar di Nata proposed the raising of a national defense force for the new republic. However, the proposal was rejected because it could provoke clashes with the occupying Imperial Japanese Army who were still armed and invited the intervention of Allied troops who would disarm the Japanese army after the Surrender of Japan. The 344,000 Japanese troops throughout Indonesia were mentally devastated by losing the war. With an unstable mental state, they were given the task by the allied forces to maintain security in Indonesia until they arrive in the lands of the new republic.

On August 19, 1945, through the second PPKI session, the government appointed Soeprijadi, a PETA rebellion figure in Blitar, to become Minister of Security, and Vice President Mohammad Hatta then appointed Oerip to become Chief of the General Staff of TKR and would be commissioned as a Lieutenant General.

On August 20, 1945, the Family Assistance Service for Victims of War (BPKKP; Indonesian: Badan Penolong Keluarga Korban Perang) was established by the national government with its mission to serve those who were affected by the Second World War in Indonesia in any way possible, inclusive of those victims of Japanese atrocities.

== People's Security Agency ==
People's Security Agency
- Badan Keamanan Rakyat
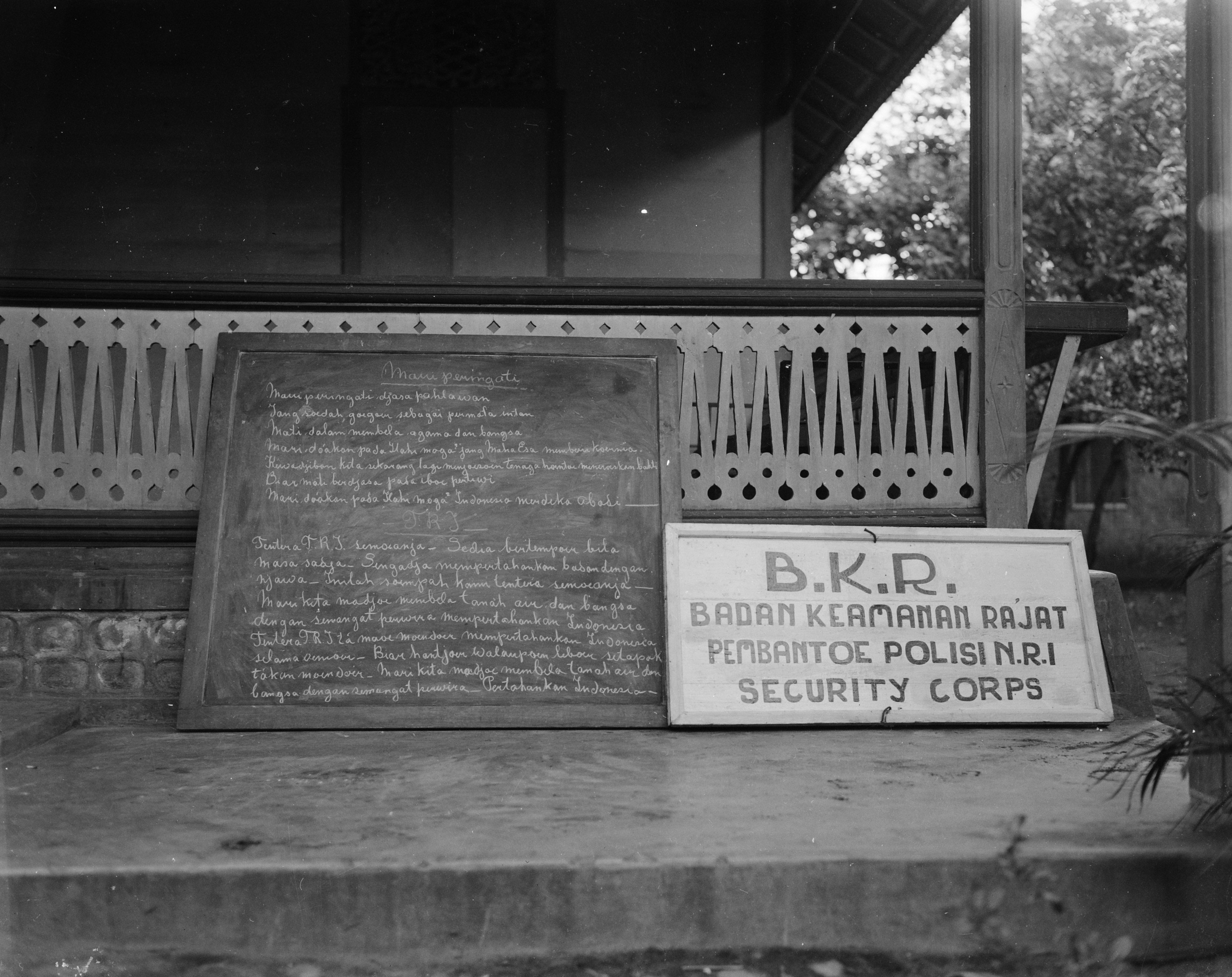
- Former office of the People's Security Agency in Padang, Sumatra
- Formation: 22 August 1945; 81 years ago
- Dissolved: 5 October 1945 (changed to the People's Security Army (TKR)
- Type: Gendarmerie
- Headquarters: Jakarta
- Location: Indonesia
- Chairman: Moefreni Moekmin

On August 22, 1945, the People's Security Agency (BKR; Indonesian: Badan Keamanan Rakyat), was formed, which was part of BPKKP, which was originally called the Soldiers' Auxiliary Agency (Indonesian: Badan Pembantu Prajurit) and later became the Auxiliary Defense Agency (Indonesian: Badan Pembantu Pembelaan), or BPP. BPP already existed during the Japanese occupation of the Dutch East Indies and was responsible for maintaining the welfare of PETA and Heiho. But on August 18, 1945, four days before the formation of BKR, Japan disbanded PETA and Heiho. The responsibility to accommodate former PETA and Heiho members was handed to BPKKP.

The BKR was formed by the Preparatory Committee for Indonesian Independence (PPKI) in its session on 22 August 1945 and announced by President Sukarno on the next day. The leaders of the time chose to take more diplomacy to gain recognition of the newly proclaimed independence. The armed Japanese occupation troops, complete with falling mental defeat, became a consideration as well, to avoid clashes when a national army was immediately formed. Members of the BKR at that time were young Indonesians who had previously received military education as Heiho soldiers, Pembela Tanah Air (PETA), the Royal Netherlands East Indies Army (KNIL) and others.

The central BKR headquarters was located in Jakarta, led by Moefreni Moekmin.

The President made a speech by inviting youth volunteers, former members of PETA, Heiho, and the Imperial Japanese Navy to gather on August 24, 1945, in their respective regions. In Jakarta, youth and former PETA successfully formulated the BKR structure by the territorial structure of the Japanese occupation. These youths call themselves BKR administrators at the central level consisting of Kaprawi, Sutaklasana, Latief Hendraningrat, Arifin Abdurrachman, Machmud, and Zulkifli Lubis.

Meanwhile, the formation of BKR outside Jakarta was spearheaded by Arudji Kartawinata (West Java), Drg Mustopo (East Java), and Sudirman (Central Java). In addition to BKR Land, BKR Sea was also formed which was spearheaded by former students and teachers from the High School of Sailing (Indonesian: Sekolah Pelayaran Tinggi) and the sailors from the Shipping Service (Indonesian: Jawatan Pelayaran) consisting of Mas Pardi, Adam, Eddy Martadinata and R Suryadi. Especially in West Java, Hidayat, and Kartakusumah as former KNIL officers joined and led the BKR of the Central Bandung Railway Station (Indonesian: Balai Besar Kereta Api Bandung) and other railway stations.

Due to limited communication facilities at that time, not all regions in Indonesia know the formation of BKR. In eastern Sumatra and Aceh, BKR never formed. But generally, the youths in the area formed an organization that would form the core of the army. In Aceh, youth established the Indonesian Youth Force (API; Indonesian: Angkatan Pemuda Indonesia), and youths in Palembang formed the People's Security Guard (PKR; Indonesian: Penjaga Keamanan Rakyat) or the People's Security Guard Agency (BPKR; Indonesian: Badan Penjaga Keamanan Rakyat).

The youth who disagreed with the establishment of the BKR formed separate resistance organizations that generally supported the independence cause. In Bandung there was the Indonesian Youth Student Association (P3I; Indonesian: Persatuan Pemuda Pelajar Indonesia), in Surabaya, there was the Indonesian Young Generation (AMI; Indonesian: Angkatan Muda Indonesia), in Padang there is the Indonesian Youth Information Center (BPPI; Indonesian: Balai Penerangan Pemuda Indonesia), and in South Kalimantan, there was the Youth League of the Republic of Indonesia (BPRI; Indonesian: Barisan Pemuda Republik Indonesia).

All these independent regional formations formed the basis of the Laskar groups that served as auxiliaries to the armed forces.

=== Formation of BKR Land Forces ===
On 29 August 1945, the Central Indonesian National Committee (KNIP) was established and authorized by the government. Then KNIP endorsed the establishment of the BKR Center in Jakarta. BKR Jakarta is led by Moefreni Moekmin assisted by Priyatna, Soeroto Koento, Daan Yahya, Daan Mogot, Sujono, and Latief Hendraningrat. In Bogor, BKR was formed in October 1945 and was pioneered by former PETA members Husein Sastranegara and Ibrahim Adjie.

In Parahyangan, a BKR group was formed on August 28, 1945, and led by Arudji Kartawinata (former Daidan PETA in Cimahi) and Pardjaman (former Daidan PETA in Bandung). The establishment of BKR Parahyangan was followed by the formation of BKR groups in Garut, Tasikmalaya, Ciamis, Majalengka, and Purwakarta. BKR Lembang is led by Amir Machmud while BKR Sumedang was led by future Vice President Umar Wirahadikusumah.

BKR groups were also established in other regions of Indonesia. In Central Java, BKR Purwokerto was led by Soedirman, while BKR Surakarta was led by GPH Djatikoesoemo. In Surabaya on August 24, 1945, a meeting was held to form a local chapter of the BKR which was attended by Moestopo, Jonosewojo, Soengkono, and Sukarno. The result of the meeting was a September 10, 1945 resolution to the former members of PETA, Heiho, and other youths, and indirectly to Indonesian-born veterans of the Royal Netherlands East Indies Army and Gendarmerie as well as the Imperial Japanese Army, calling on them to answer the call to service, joining battalions of the PSA in their communities.

=== Establishment of BKR Navy ===
The announcement of the establishment of BKR was also greeted enthusiastically by the youths who served in the marine sector, ex-Indonesian personnel of the Imperial Navy, Royal Netherlands Navy and the Netherlands East Indies Government Navy, the employees of Jawa Unko Kaisha and the students and teachers of the High School of Sailing. They took the initiative to maintain order and security in port towns and cities as well as to secure important marine supply and transport routes.

Pioneered by Mas Pardi, the youths held meetings. The result of these meetings was the September 10, 1945 formation of the BKR Navy Center led by Mas Pardi and then endorsed by the Central Indonesian National Committee.

After getting the approval from the CINC BKR Navy personnel would later take over the Jawa Unko Kaisha building and buildings in Port of Tanjung Priok. The BKR Navy Center also issued instructions to youth sailors and others related to the maritime industry to immediately establish a BKR Sea chapter in their respective areas to ensure a maritime security capability.

=== Formation of BKR Air Force ===
The formation of BKR Air Force was spearheaded by former Dutch and Japanese aviators in the air base areas and assisted by youth who had never served in the field of aviation. The former Dutch aviators were former members of the Royal Netherlands East Indies Army Air Force, the Netherlands Naval Aviation Service and the Volunteer Flying Corps (Dutch: Vrijwillig Vliegers Corps). In addition there were former Japanese aviators who served in the Nanpo Koku Kabusyiki and veterans of the Imperial Army and Navy, as well as Indonesian servicemen from these services.

== Formation ==
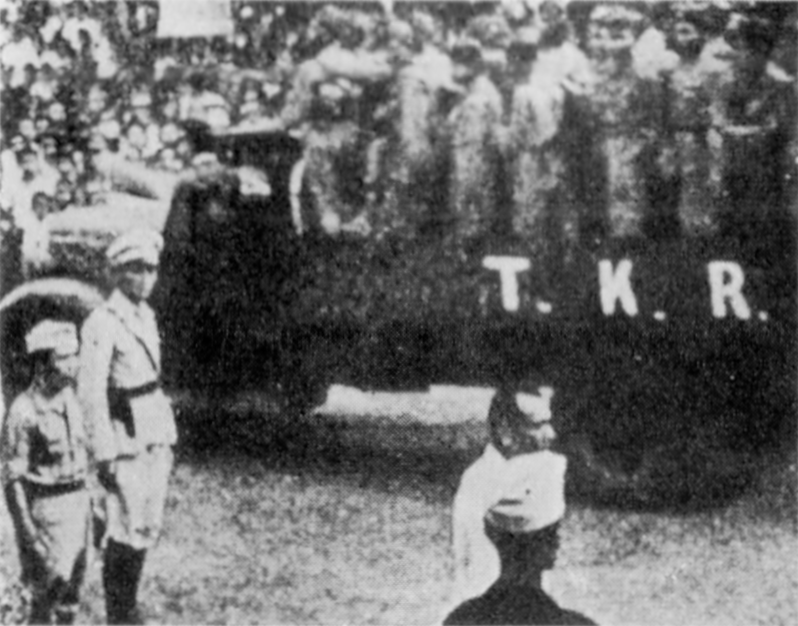
TKR

On October 5, 1945 the Indonesian government issued an edict containing the formation of a national army on the basis of the People's Security Agency - this would later be celebrated as Indonesian National Armed Forces Day. Vice President Mohammad Hatta then summoned a former KNIL officer, Major Oerip Soemohardjo to Jakarta to help in organizing this new formation.

On October 9, 1945, the Central Indonesian National Committee issued a TKR mobilization call which called on all young Indonesian people, both those who had not received military training and those who had received military training, to register themselves as members of the TKR. On October 14, 1945, former Indonesian KNIL officers issued a statement to the Indonesian government and the Central Indonesian National Committee, that these officers stood behind the Indonesian government and were ready to accept any orders.

On October 20, 1945 the government appointed Suprijadi as Commander of the TKR and Oerip Soemohardjo as Chief of General Staff. However, Suprijadi apparently never held that position. After Major Oerip was appointed Chief of General Staff with the rank of Lieutenant General, Oerip immediately formed the TKR Headquarters (MT-TKR) organization, modeled on the Dutch East Indies War Department. Then a General Headquarters organization was also prepared which was part of the TKR Supreme Headquarters. Initially the TKR High Headquarters was set in Purwokerto, but based on suggestions and strategic considerations from Oerip, the headquarters and connected elements was then moved to Yogyakarta.

=== Establishment of the TKR Navy ===
After the government issued a proclamation on October 5, 1945 regarding the formation of TKR, BKR Laut automatically also transformed itself into TKR Laut. Officially the name TKR Laut was approved on 15 November 1945. The TKR Laut headquarters was also moved from Jakarta to Yogyakarta.

To create uniformity in the TKR organization, negotiations were also held between the TKR Laut leaders, namely Mas Pardi, Mohammad Nazir Isa, Sumarno, R.E. Martadinata, and R Suardi with Oerip Soemohardjo as TKR Chief of General Staff. As a result of these negotiations, on December 1, 1945, the Supreme Headquarters of the Marine TKR was formed and Mas Pardi was appointed as Chief of Staff of the Navy and commissioned with the rank of Admiral III.

The results of the negotiations also decided to establish a Navy TKR division consisting of Division I West Java headquartered in Cirebon, Division II Central Java headquartered in Purworejo and Division III East Java which is headquartered in Surabaya. Meanwhile the establishment of the Navy TKR in Sumatra was proceeding rapidly. In the second week of October 1945, Navy TKR units had been formed in the cities of Tanjung Karang, Palembang, Padang, Sibolga and Medan in Sumatra.

=== Establishment of the TKR Aviation Service ===
Government Decree No. 6 dated 5 October 1945 required that the TKR to be responsible for all order and security on land, at sea and in the air. Therefore, responsibility and authority over the air bases and all equipment that had been captured from Japan was to be directly under the authority of the TKR. On December 12, 1945, the TKR Supreme Headquarters issued an announcement stating the formation of an aviation section as part of the General Headquarters. Thus all aviation departments throughout Indonesia, including soldiers and base employees, are under the command of the Head of the TKR Aviation Section who is located at General Headquarters. Soerjadi Soerjadarma and Soekarmen Martodisoemo were appointed as Head and Deputy Head of the TKR Aviation Service, respectively and were commissioned into the new force as Air Commodore and Group Captain, respectively.

=== Baptism of fire: Semarang, Medan and Surabaya ===
Almost weeks after the formation of the TKR did units of the new force - all ex-BKR - would finally see their first taste of action. In mid-October, TKR ground troops and Republican police in Semarang retaliated against a planned Dutch takeover of government institutions by killing hundreds of Japanese prisoners held in the city's prisons beginning on the 14th, which led to a five day battle against a battalion of the Imperial Japanese Army that ended with a ceasefire on the 19th. Just kilometers away, TKR battalions had taken armed action in Magelang to rescue Indonesian youth activists aligned with Jakarta which had been kidnapped by the British Army under suspicion of supporting the Republican cause, resulting in the first every victory won by the young TKR.

TKR units in Sumatra had their first battle in October that same year, when the new force fought against an Anglo-Dutch contingent in North Sumatra, particularly in its provincial capital of Medan.

The TKR participated in the Battle of Surabaya on 10 November that same year - a month and a few days after its establishment. While being the biggest defeat of the National Revolution so far for the new force, it was the largest single battle of the Indonesian resistance which helped galvanize Indonesian independence.

== Sources ==
- Hatta, Mohammad (2011). Untuk Negeriku: Sebuah Otobiografi [For My Nation: An Autobiography] (in Indonesian). Penerbit Buku Kompas. ISBN 9789797095406.
- Markas Besar TNI (2000). Sejarah TNI Jilid I (1945-1949). Jakarta: Pusat Sejarah Dan Tradisi TNI. ISBN 979-9421-00-4. 979-9421-01-2.
