= Eddy Martadinata =

Indonesian admiral, national hero

Admiral Raden Eddy Martadinata
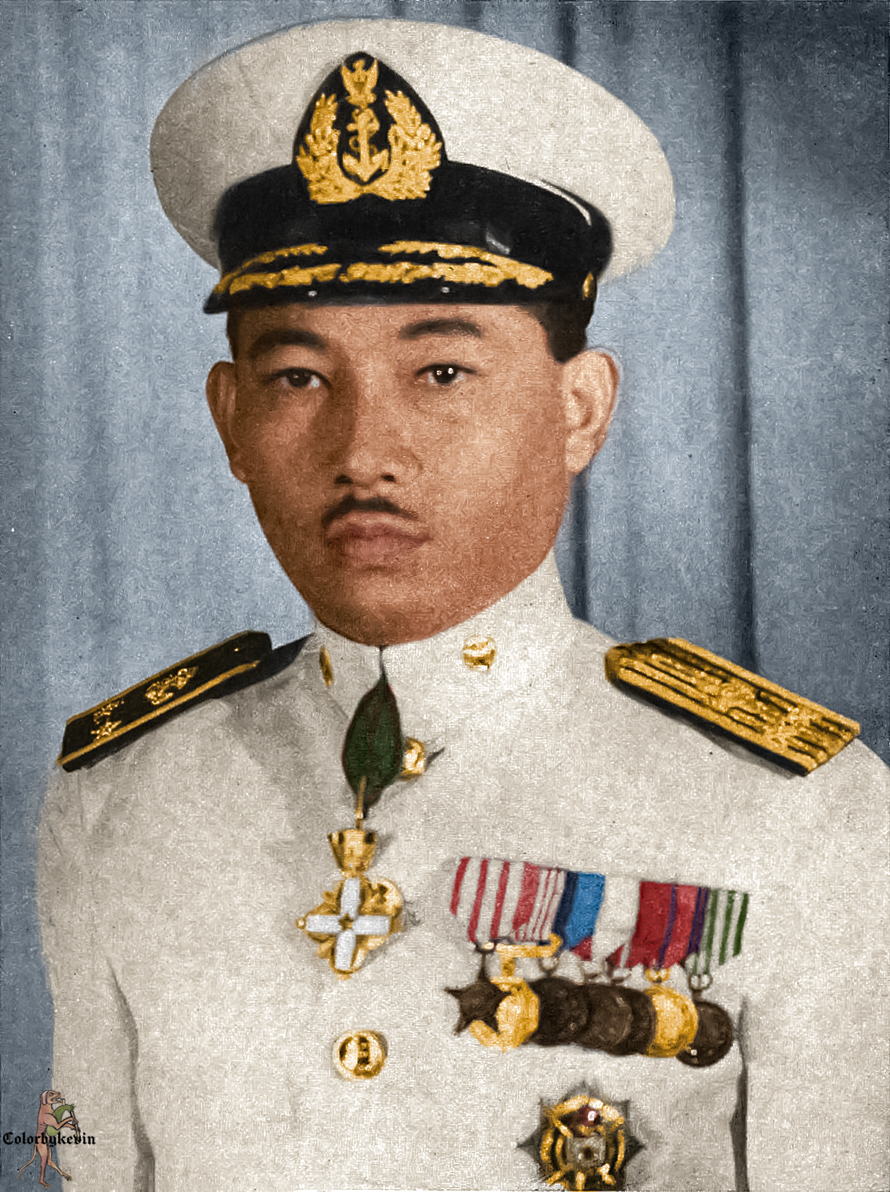
- Martadinata in 1960 (colorized)

Minister/Commander of the Navy of the Republic of Indonesia
- In office July 1959 – 25 February 1966
- President: Sukarno
- Preceded by: Vice Admiral R. Soebijakto
- Succeeded by: Admiral Moeljadi

Personal details
- Born: 29 March 1921 Bandung, West Java, Dutch East Indies
- Died: 6 October 1966 (aged 45) Mount Riung Gunung, Cisarua, Indonesia
- Resting place: Kalibata Heroes' Cemetery; 6°15′26″S 106°50′47″E
- Education: Indonesian Naval Academy
- Awards: National Hero of Indonesia (1966); Star of the Republic of Indonesia 4th class (1963); Star of Mahaputera 4th class (1961)

Military service
- Allegiance: Indonesia
- Branch/service: Indonesian Navy
- Years of service: 1945–1966
- Rank: Admiral
- Commands: Chief of Staff of the Navy
- Battles/wars: Indonesian National Revolution; Makassar Uprising

Admiral Raden Eddy Martadinata (often stylized R. E. Martadinata; 29 March 1921 – 6 October 1966) was an Indonesian Navy admiral and diplomat. He was given the title of National Hero of Indonesia posthumously in 1966. He is recognized as one of the founders of the Indonesian Navy.

== Biography ==
Martadinata was born in Bandung, West Java, on 29 March 1921. His father was Raden Ruhiyat Martadinata and his mother was Nyi Raden Suhaemi. He completed his education through senior high school, first in Bandung then in Batavia (now Jakarta). After graduating high school he enrolled in a Dutch-run school for sailors in 1941, but following the Japanese occupation the following year the school was closed. He later continued, under Japanese tutelage, and by 1944 was working as an assistant teacher.

Sukarno proclaimed Indonesia's independence in 1945, and in late August he established the People's Security Body (Badan Keamanan Rakjat, or BKR). Martadinata and other naval trainees began efforts to establish a naval branch of the BKR, which eventually became the Indonesian Navy. During the National Revolution (1945–1949) Martadinata saw several leadership positions, including as Operating Staff Chief in Yogyakarta and Chief of Staff at the base in Surabaya.

After the Dutch recognized Indonesian independence in 1949, Martadinata remained with the Navy. He oversaw naval operations in South Sulawesi in 1950, when the national government was dealing with the Makassar uprising. In 1953 he was sent to study in the United States. After his return to Indonesia he supervised the purchase of various ships for the Navy. After a period of infighting in the late 1950s, Martadinata replaced Subiyakto as Chief of Staff of the Indonesian Navy, leaving him in charge of the service branch; the infighting quelled soon after. Martadinata rose through the ranks, reaching vice admiral by 1960.

The 30 September Movement in 1965, an unsuccessful coup attempt which the government blamed on the Communist Party of Indonesia, led to massive changes in the country. At a funeral for Irma, a daughter of Abdul Haris Nasution who had been killed in the coup, Martadinata indicated a wish to purge the communists; this and similar communist purges led to deaths of thousands, although the total number of victims is uncertain. In February 1966 Martadinata left the Navy as he perceived the government to be unwilling to deal with communists. He was reassigned as Indonesia's ambassador to Pakistan.

For the 21st anniversary of the Indonesian Armed Forces on 5 October 1966, Martadinata returned to the country with some Pakistani guests. The day after the ceremony, Martadinata and his guests were flying in an Aérospatiale Alouette II helicopter when the pilot crashed into Mount Riung Gunung at Puncak Pass. After his body was recovered, Martadinata was buried in Kalibata Heroes' Cemetery in Jakarta. A monument with an Alouette II helicopter was later built at the crash site. Since then he has been the namesake for various items, including streets, a building at the Navy Command and Staff College and two warships (KRI Martadinata (342) and KRI Raden Eddy Martadinata (331)).

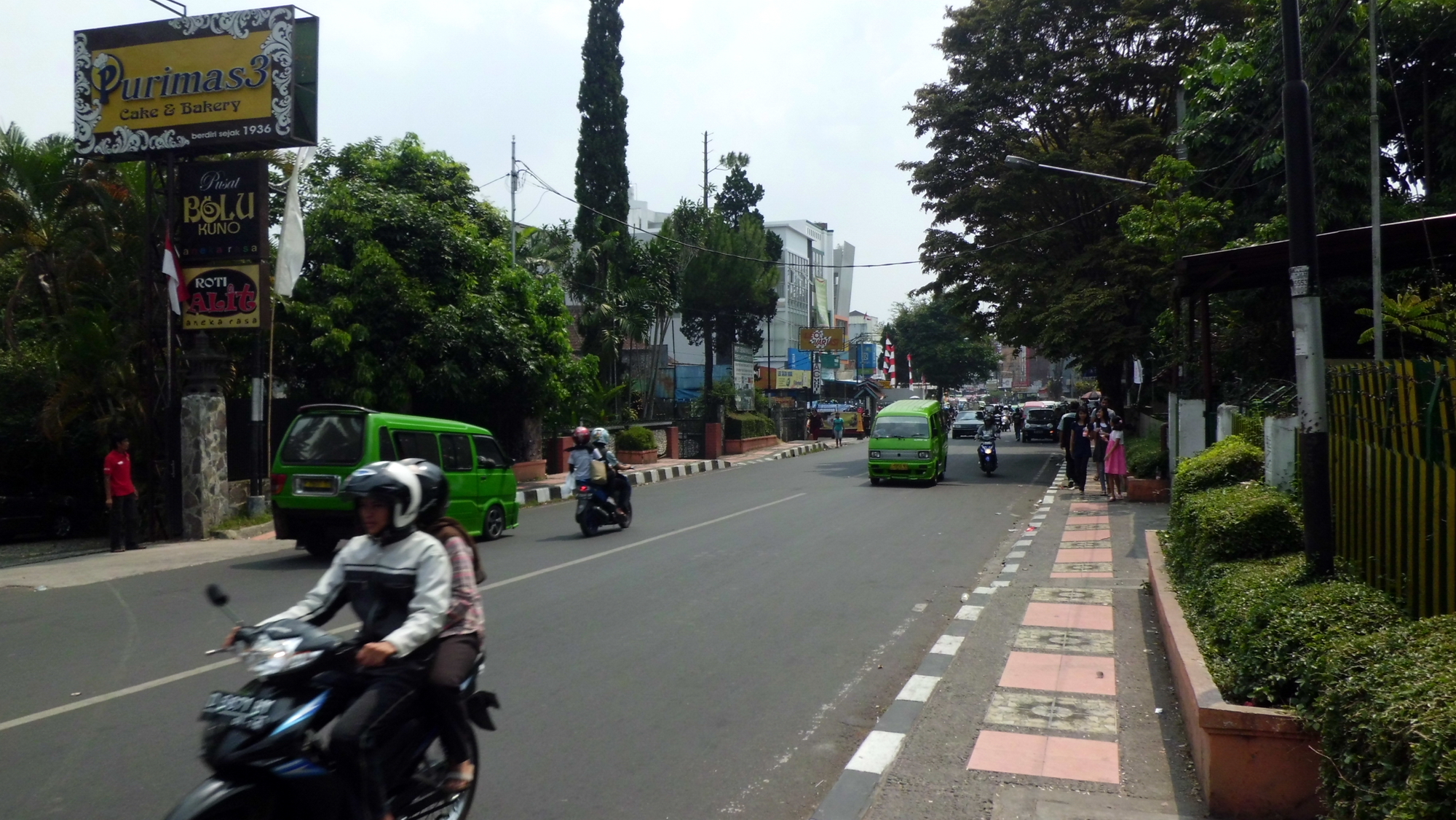
Raden Eddy Martadinata Road, Sukabumi, West Java

Martadinata was awarded the title of National Hero of Indonesia on 7 October 1966, based on Presidential Decree No. 220 of 1966.

== Honours ==
=== National Honours ===
- Indonesia :
  - Star of the Republic of Indonesia 4th Class (1963)
  - Star of Mahaputera 4th Class (1961)
  - Sacred Star
  - Military Distinguished Service Star
  - Guerrilla Star
  - Armed Forces Eight Years’ Service Star
  - Military Long Service Medal, 16 Years Service
  - 1st Independence War Medal
  - 2nd Independence War Medal
  - Military Operational Service Medal for Madiun 1947
  - Military Operational Service Medal for Angkatan Ratu Adil 1947
  - Military Service Medal for Irian Jaya 1962
  - Northern Borneo Military Campaign Medal

=== Foreign Honours ===
- Yugoslavia :
  - Order of Military Merits with Golden Swords (2nd Rank)
- Italy :
  - Commander of the Order of Merit of the Italian Republic (1959)
- United States :
  - Commander of the Legion of Merit
- Thailand :
  - Knight Commander of the Most Exalted Order of the White Elephant (1960)
- Philippine :
  - Commander of the Philippine Legion of Honor (1963)
