= Battle of Maguwo =

Part of the Indonesian National Revolution (1945)

- Part of Indonesian National Revolution
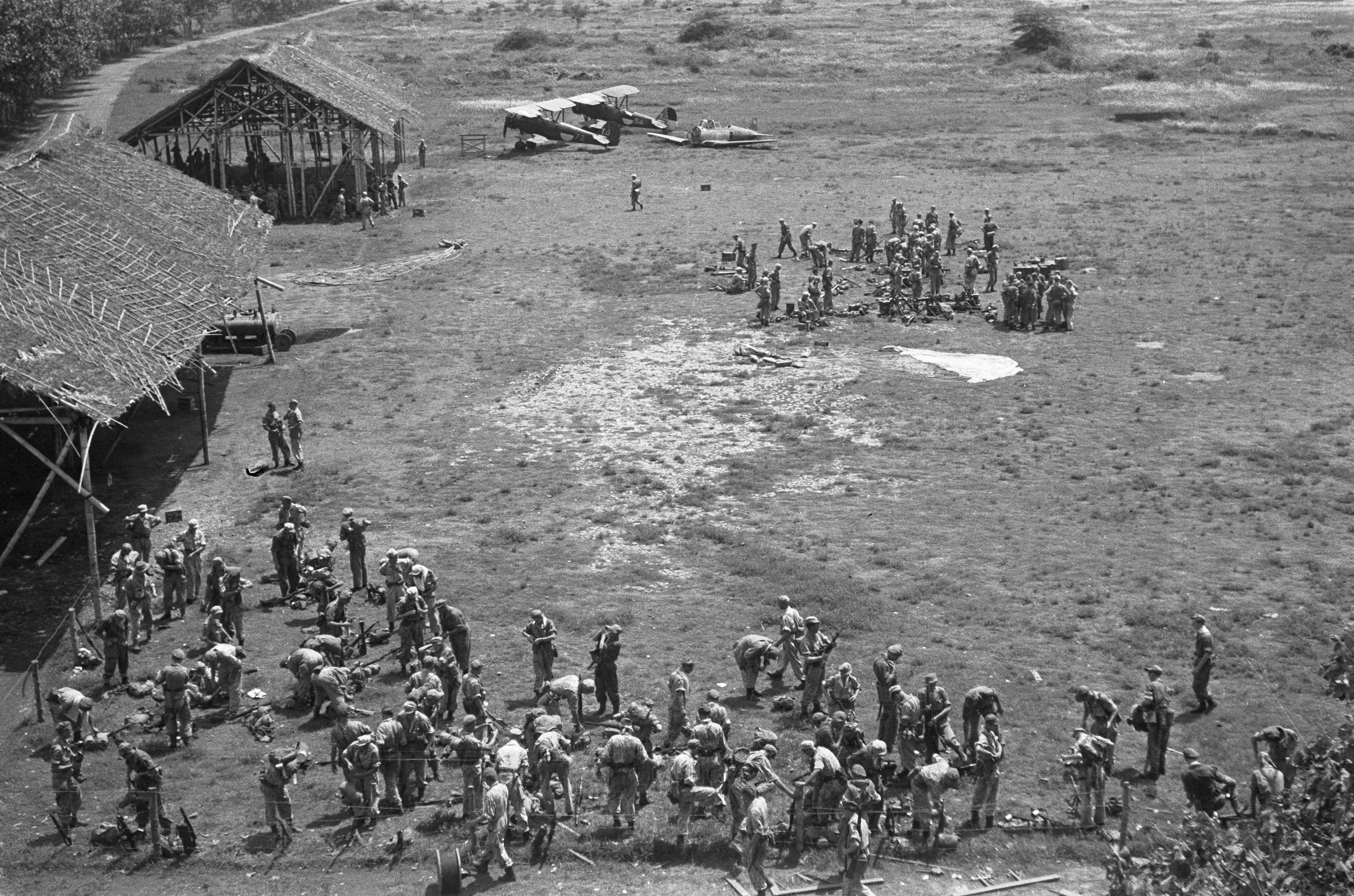
- Maguwo Air Base in December 1948
Date	2 October 1945
Location	Maguwo (now in Sleman Regency, Special Region of Yogyakarta)
Result	Indonesian victory
Territorial changes	Maguwo Air Base is captured by the Indonesian forces

Belligerents
Indonesia	Japan

Commanders and leaders
(Indonesia) Surojo	

Units involved
People's Security Forces (BKR); BKR Pusat; BKR Udara Yogyakarta Timur; BKR Udara Maguwo	Japanese garrison

Strength
~80 BKR members ~200 people's militia	Unknown

Casualties and losses
Unknown	25 Japanese soldiers captured around 50 aircraft captured

The Battle of Maguwo (Indonesian: Pertempuran Maguwo) was a battle between the newly founded Indonesian People's Security Agency against the Imperial Japanese military, which occurred on 2 October 1945 in Yogyakarta.

== Background ==
Following the Surrender of Japan on 15 August, Indonesia proclaimed independence on 17 August 1945. At the time of the proclamation, most of Indonesia was still under Japanese occupation. Soon after, the Preparatory Committee for Indonesian Independence established the People's Security Agency or BKR on 22 August 1945. The BKR in Yogyakarta was formed from former Heiho members. Yogyakarta was one of the places where Japanese air power was concentrated. Maguwo Air Base was under control of the Japanese Kaigun Kokusho headquartered in Surabaya.

== Battle ==
On 2 October 1945, at 5 A.M., Indonesian troops were given orders to hold their positions as preparation for the attack. BKR Udara Maguwo launched the attack against the Japanese garrison at Maguwo Air Base, led by Surojo, a former luchtschutter in the Militaire Luchtvaart. Surojo begun the attack by throwing grenade at the Air Base tower, signaling BKR Pusat and Yogyakarta Timur to start the attack which was carried out at day, and sudden during breaktime, leaving little time for the garrison to mount a defensive position leading to the defeat, and surrender of the remaining Japanese garrison. In the midst of the battle, 3 aircraft were able to escape, but one of the pilots was shot dead when he was about to enter the cockpit of his aircraft.

Indonesian forces also attacked a Japanese Transportation Post (Perhubungan PHB) located in Sambilegi Village, north of Maguwo Air Base. During the battle of Maguwo Air Base, BKR Udara Maguwo was also tasked to attack areas east of the Tambakbayan river, while the western side was attacked by BKR Pusat. The Japanese garrison retreated to south of Padasan village and hid in shelters that they had prepared beforehand, but they would later be captured by Indonesian forces.

== Aftermath ==
After the Japanese defeat, the Indonesian forces managed to capture 17 rifles, 6 Stens, and 2 pistols. The Indonesian forces also captured around 50 aircraft in the Air Base, and took over the Air Base's facilities. During the Battle of Kotabaru on 7 October 1945, BKR Udara Maguwo was tasked to isolate Japanese forces in Wonocatur and Maguwo to prevent the Japanese from reinforcing their headquarters in Kotabaru.

== See also ==
- Battle of Kotabaru
