= Indonesian National Revolution =

1945–1949 Indonesian conflict and diplomatic struggle against Dutch rule

- Part of the aftermath of World War II, the decolonisation of Asia, and the Cold War in Asia
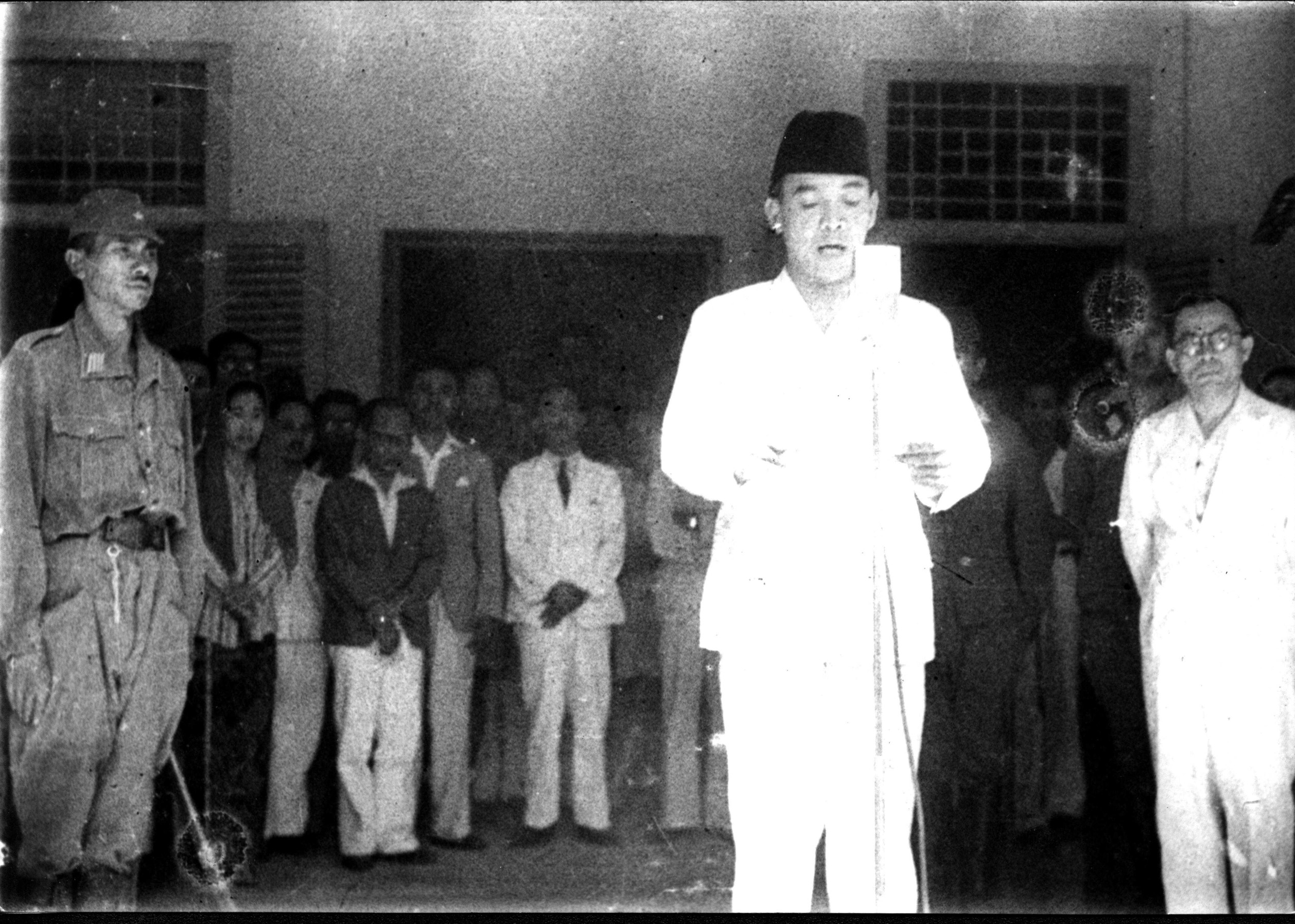
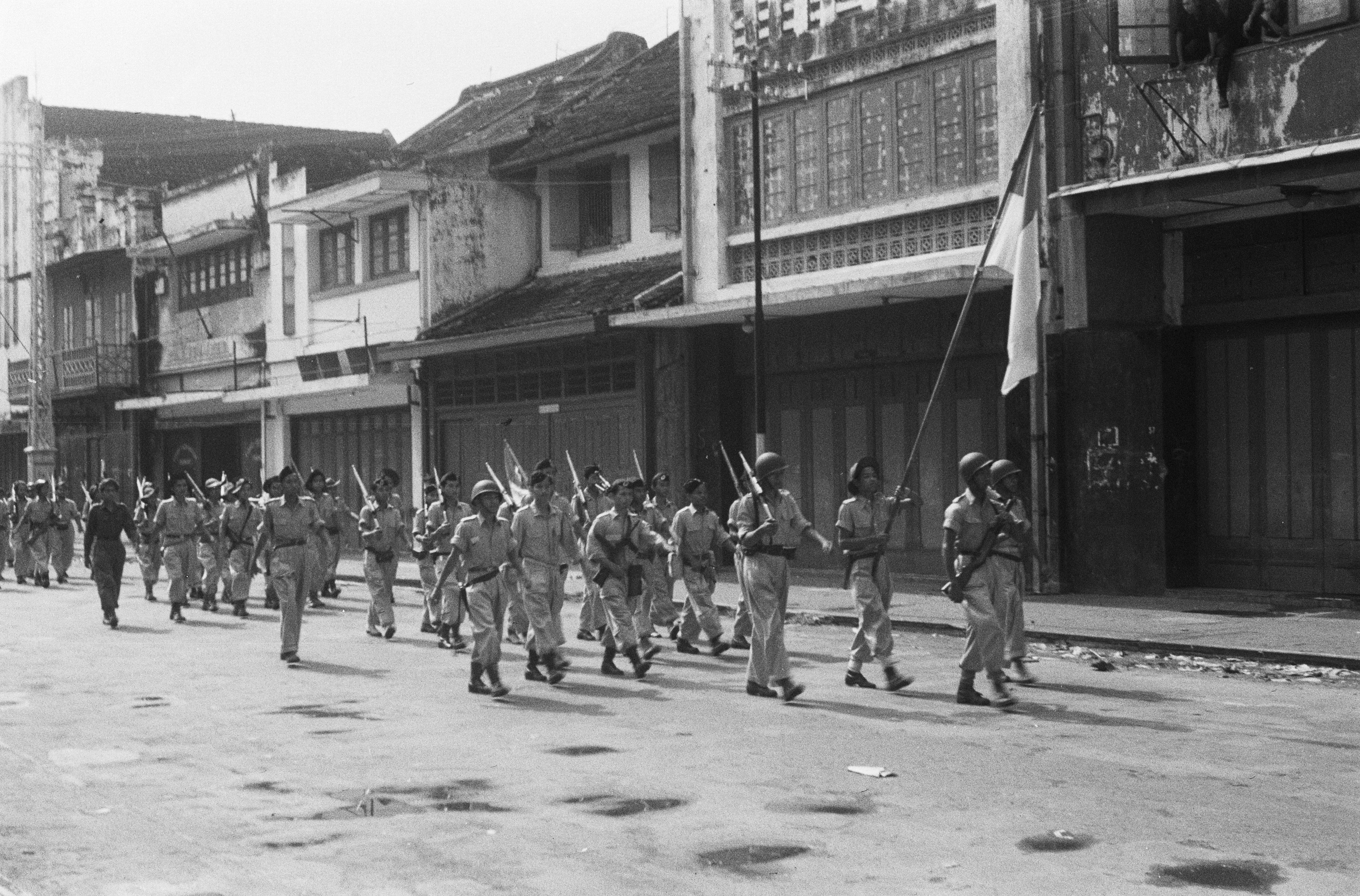
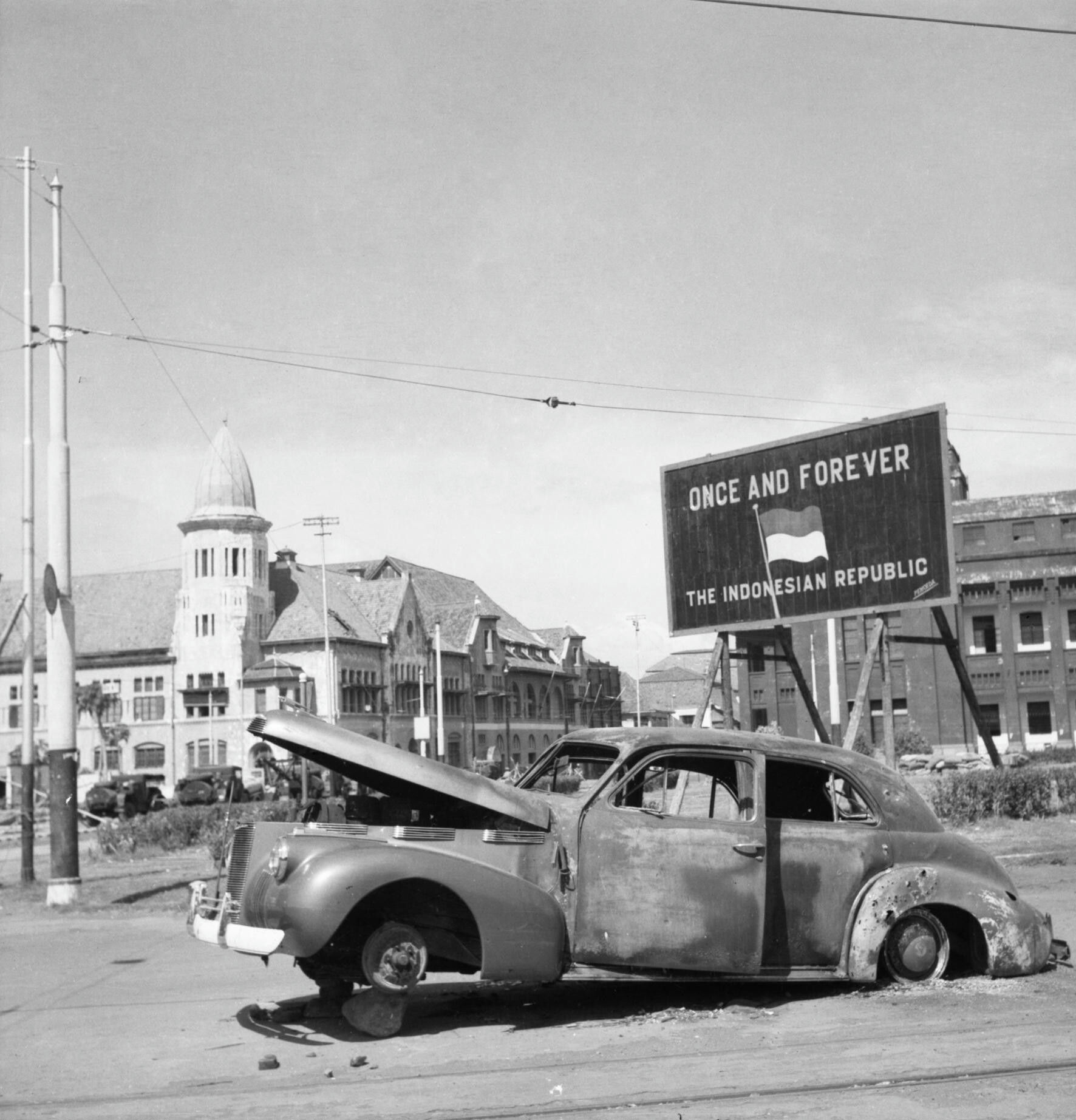
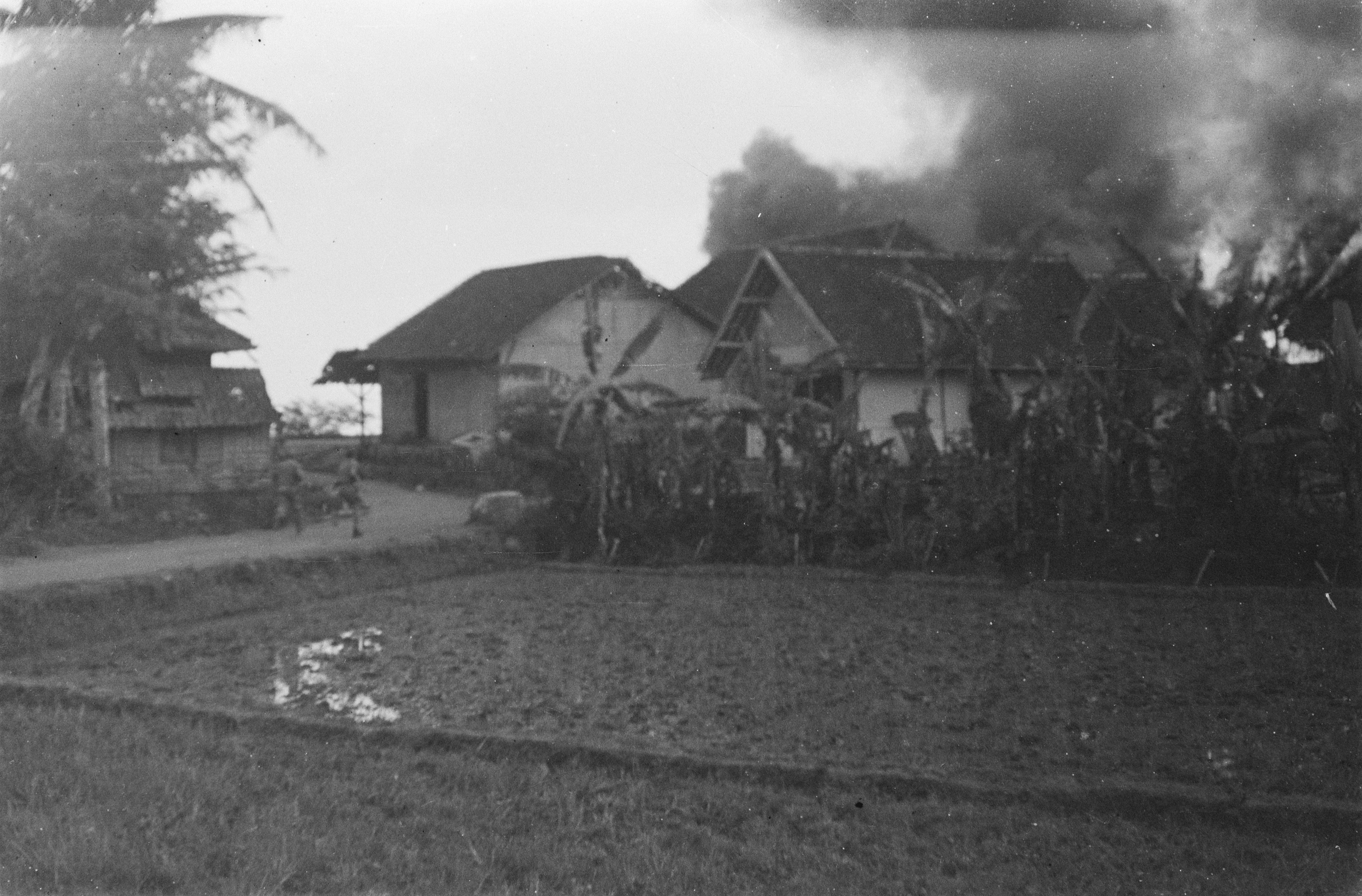
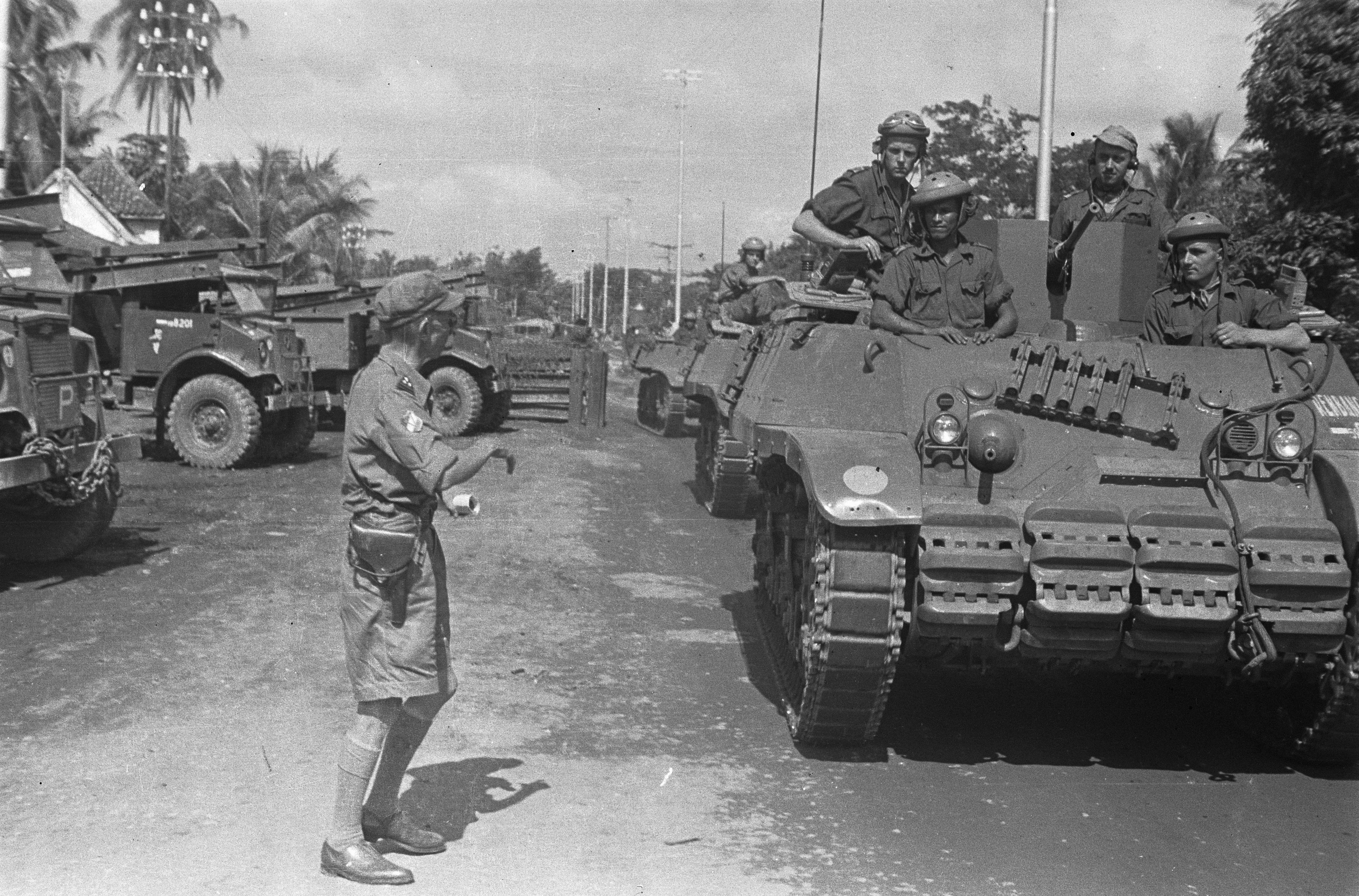
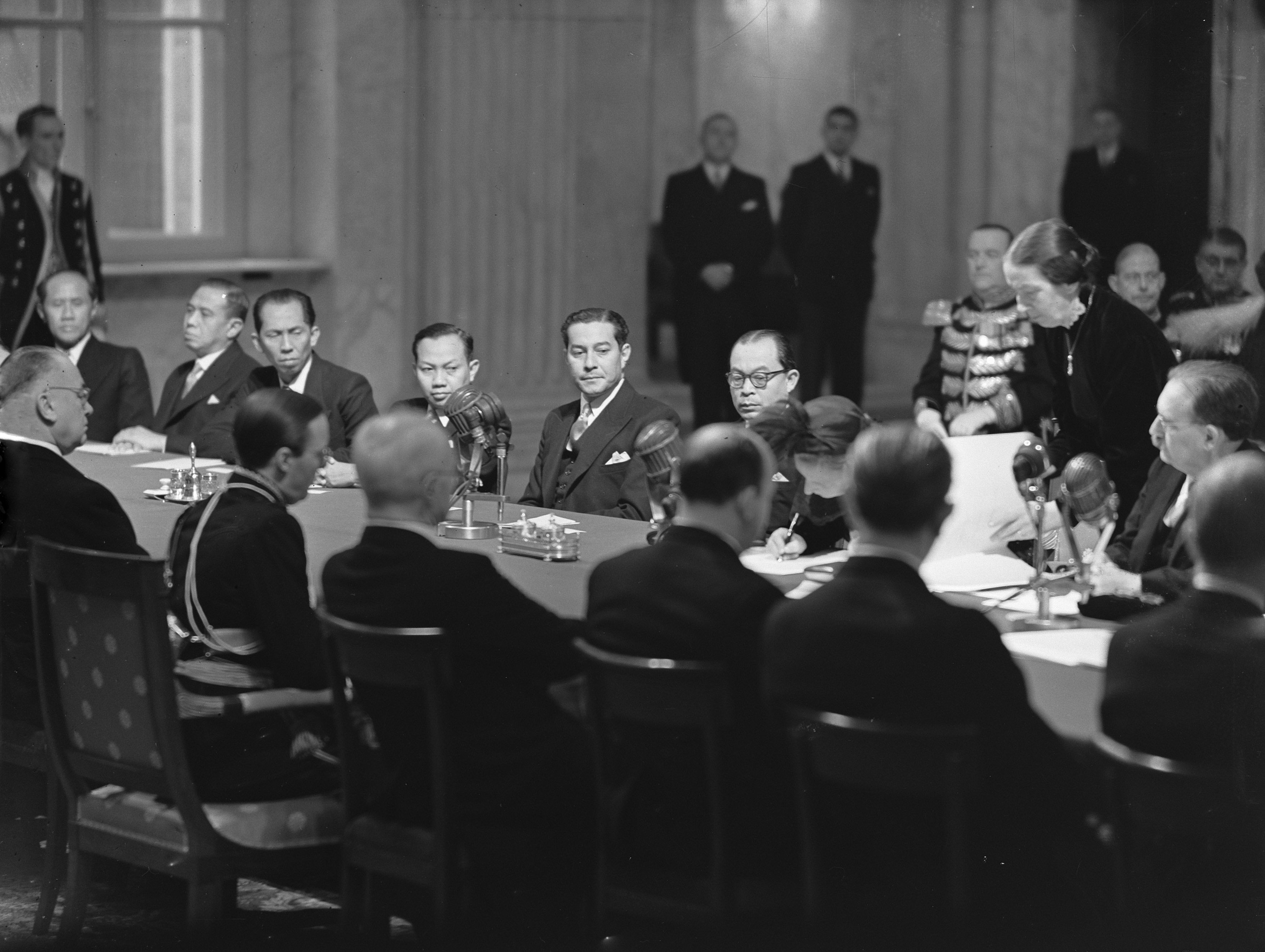
- From top, left to right: Sukarno and Mohammad Hatta proclaimed Indonesia's independence on 17 August 1945.; Indonesian soldiers in the streets, November 1949.; Remains of the car of Brigadier Aubertin Walter Sothern Mallaby, where he was killed on 30 October 1945 during the Battle of Surabaya.; A village near Bandung, where a number of houses were set on fire. Two Indonesian soldiers are visible on the left of the picture.; Dutch forces during Operation Kraai, 1948.; Queen Juliana of the Netherlands signing the Soevereiniteitsoverdracht (Transfer of Sovereignty) of Indonesia.
Date	17 August 1945 – 27 December 1949 (4 years, 4 months, 1 week and 3 days)
Location	Dutch East Indies (today Indonesia)
Result	Indonesian victory; Independence of Indonesia from the Netherlands; End of Dutch rule over most parts of Indonesia, as the Dutch East Indies ceased to exist; Dutch recognition of Indonesian independence in the Dutch-Indonesian Round Table Conference; Formation of the United States of Indonesia; Creation of the Netherlands-Indonesia Union; Beginning of the Age of Gerombolan
Territorial changes	Netherlands cedes control of most territories of the Dutch East Indies to the United States of Indonesia

Belligerents
Indonesia; PDRI (Note: 1948-1949, after Operation Kraai); TNI; POLRI; Japanese holdouts; Internal conflict: DI/TII (from 1948) FDR Tangerang India (Note: after 1947)	Netherlands (Note: from 1946); Dutch East Indies; KNIL; NICA; Pao An Tui (Note: claimed neutrality); United Kingdom (Note: until 1946); British Raj; Australia; Japanese holdouts

Commanders and leaders
Sukarno; Mohammad Hatta; Sutan Syahrir; Tan Malaka; Mohammad Yamin; Gatot Soebroto; Abdul H. Nasution and others... S.M Kartosoewirjo; Amir Fatah; Musso (executed); Amir Sjarifuddin (executed); D. N. Aidit	Louis Beel; Willem Drees; Hubertus van Mook; Simon Spoor; Albertus S. Pinke; Tony Lovink; A. Widjojoatmodjo; Raymond Westerling; Louis Mountbatten; A.W.S Mallaby †; R.G.L. Symonds †; Robert Mansergh; Philip Christison

Strength
Regular forces: 150,000 (1945) 200,000 (1946) ~195.000 (1947) 175,000–350,000 (1948); Police forces: 35,000 (1948); Irregular forces: 100,000–140,000 (1945) (Note: in Surabaya) 168.000 (1947) 175,000–470,000 (1948); Japanese volunteers: 903; Indian defectors: 746	Netherlands: 220,000; United Kingdom: 45,000–60,000; Australia: 50,000; Japan: 35,000 (Note: There were 300,000 Japanese troops in Indonesia, but not all Japanese soldiers who stayed in Indonesia after World War II sided with the Dutch and the British; many of them remained neutral and 903 supported the Indonesian nationalists.)

Casualties and losses
Indonesia: (civilian and combatants): 97,421 (confirmed killed) 100,000–250,000 killed (highest estimate); Japanese volunteers: 531 killed; Indian defectors: 525 killed	Netherlands: 4,585 (Note: 2,479 killed in action and 2,106 who died of disease or accidents (in total: 4,585).) –5,281 killed (old estimate) (Note: 2,777 killed in action and 2,504 who died of disease or accidents (in total: 5,281).) 15,000 killed (modern estimate) (Note: 6,225 Military and 9,000 NICA member and Collaborator.); United Kingdom: 980–1,200 killed; Australia: 2 killed (Note: in South Sulawesi); Japan: 1,743 killed (Note: Confirmed killed: 200 killed in Aceh; 1,057 killed in Java; 250 killed in Medan; 236 executed by Dutch); • 5,500–30,000 Indo people and European civilians killed and 2,500 missing

The Indonesian National Revolution (Indonesian: Revolusi Nasional Indonesia), also known as the Indonesian War of Independence, was an armed conflict and diplomatic struggle between the Republic of Indonesia and the Dutch Empire and an internal social revolution during postwar and postcolonial Indonesia. It took place between Indonesia's declaration of independence in 1945 and the Netherlands' transfer of sovereignty over the Dutch East Indies to the Republic of the United States of Indonesia at the end of 1949.

The four-year struggle involved sporadic but bloody armed conflict, internal Indonesian political and communal upheavals, and two major international diplomatic interventions. Dutch military forces (and, for a while, the forces of the World War II allies such as the United Kingdom) were able to control the major towns, cities and industrial assets in Republican heartlands on Java and Sumatra but could not control the countryside. By 1949, international pressure on the Netherlands, the United States threatening to cut off all economic aid for World War II rebuilding efforts to the Netherlands and the partial military stalemate became such that the Netherlands transferred sovereignty over the Dutch East Indies to the Republic of the United States of Indonesia.

The revolution marked the end of the colonial administration of the Dutch East Indies, except for Dutch New Guinea. It also significantly changed ethnic castes as well as reducing the power of many of the local rulers (raja). It did not significantly improve the economic or political fortunes of the majority of the population, although a few Indonesians were able to gain a larger role in commerce.

== Background ==
The Indonesian independence movement began on 20 May 1908, which is commemorated as the "Day of National Awakening" (Indonesian: Hari Kebangkitan Nasional). Indonesian nationalism and movements supporting independence from Dutch colonialism, such as Budi Utomo, the Indonesian National Party (PNI), Sarekat Islam and the Indonesian Communist Party (PKI), grew rapidly in the first half of the 20th century. Budi Utomo, Sarekat Islam and others pursued strategies of co-operation by joining the Dutch initiated Volksraad ("People's Council") in the hope that Indonesia would be granted self-rule. Others chose a non-cooperative strategy demanding the freedom of self-government from the Dutch East Indies colony.

The occupation of Indonesia by Japan for three and a half years during World War II was a crucial factor in the subsequent revolution. The Netherlands had minimal ability to defend its colony against the Japanese army, and within only three months of their initial attacks, the Japanese had occupied the Dutch East Indies. In Java, and to a lesser extent in Sumatra (Indonesia's two dominant islands), the Japanese spread and encouraged nationalist sentiment. Although this was done more for Japanese political advantage than from altruistic support of Indonesian independence, this support created new Indonesian institutions (including local neighbourhood organisations) and elevated political leaders such as Sukarno. Just as significantly for the subsequent revolution, the Japanese destroyed and replaced much of the Dutch-created economic, administrative, and political infrastructure.

On 7 September 1944, with the war going badly for the Japanese, Prime Minister Koiso promised independence for Indonesia, but no date was set. For supporters of Sukarno, this announcement was seen as vindication for his collaboration with the Japanese.

== History ==
=== Japanese surrender ===
==== Proclamation of Indonesian Independence ====
The unconditional surrender of Japan on 15 August 1945 was eagerly received by the radical and politicised pemuda (Indonesian for 'male youth') groups. The initial Indonesian support for Japan's Greater East Asia Co-Prosperity Sphere had faded. They pressured Sukarno and Hatta to proclaim Indonesian independence on 17 August 1945, two days later. The following day, the Preparatory Committee for Indonesian Independence (PPKI) elected Sukarno as president, and Hatta as vice-president.

PROCLAMATION

We, the people of Indonesia, hereby declare the independence of Indonesia.

Matters which concern the transfer of power and other things will be executed by careful means and in the shortest possible time.

Djakarta, 17 August 1945 (Note: In fact, 05 was used for the year meaning Japanese imperial year 2605.)

In the name of the people of Indonesia,

[signed] Soekarno—Hatta

(translation by the Ministry of Foreign Affairs, October 1948)

==== Revolution and Bersiap ====
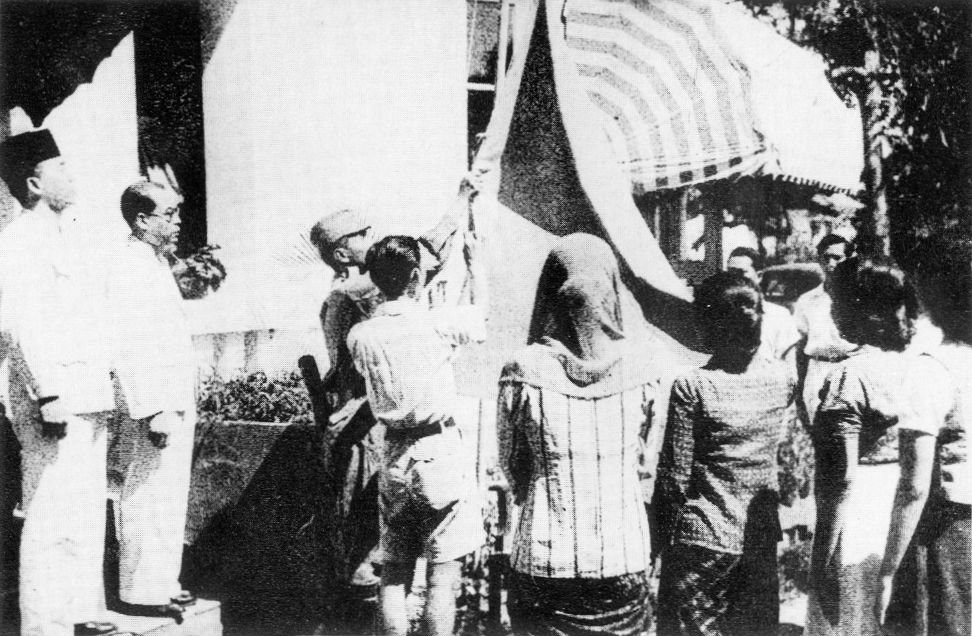
Bendera Pusaka, the first Indonesian flag, is raised on 17 August 1945.

It was mid-September before news of the declaration of independence spread to the outer islands, and many Indonesians far from the capital Jakarta did not believe it. As the news spread, most Indonesians came to regard themselves as pro-Republican, and a mood of revolution swept across the country. External power had shifted; it would be weeks before Allied Forces shipping entered Indonesia (owing in part to boycotts and strikes, in Australia, on coaling, loading and manning Dutch shipping from Australia, where the Netherlands East Indies Government in exile was based). These strikes were only fully broken in July 1946. The Japanese, on the other hand, were required by the terms of the surrender to both lay down their arms and maintain order; a contradiction that some resolved by handing weapons to Japanese-trained Indonesians.

The resulting power vacuums in Java and Sumatra in the weeks following the Japanese surrender created an atmosphere of uncertainty, but also one of opportunity for the Republicans. Many pemuda joined pro-Republic struggle groups (badan perjuangan). The most disciplined were soldiers from the Japanese-formed but disbanded Giyūgun (PETA, volunteer army) and Heiho (local soldiers employed by Japanese armed forces) groups. Many groups were undisciplined, due to both the circumstances of their formation and what they perceived as revolutionary spirit. In the first weeks, Japanese troops often withdrew from urban areas to avoid confrontations.

By September 1945, control of major infrastructure like railway stations and trams in Java's largest cities had been taken over by Republican pemuda, such as the Railway Youth Force, who encountered little Japanese resistance. To spread the revolutionary message, pemuda set up their own radio stations and newspapers, and graffiti proclaimed the nationalist sentiment. On most islands, struggle committees and militia were set up. Republican newspapers and journals were common in Jakarta, Yogyakarta, and Surakarta, which fostered a generation of writers known as angkatan 45 ('generation of 45') many of whom believed their work could be part of the revolution.

Republican leaders struggled to come to terms with popular sentiment; some wanted passionate armed struggle; others a more reasoned approach. Some leaders, such as the leftist Tan Malaka, spread the idea that this was a revolutionary struggle to be led and won by the Indonesian pemuda. Sukarno and Hatta, by contrast, were more interested in planning government and institutions to achieve independence through diplomacy. Pro-revolution demonstrations took place in large cities, including one in Jakarta on 19 September with over 200,000 people, which Sukarno and Hatta, fearing violence, successfully quelled.

By September 1945, many of the self-proclaimed pemuda, who were ready to die for '100% freedom', were getting impatient. It was common for ethnic 'out-groups' – Dutch internees, Eurasian, Ambonese, Chinese, Minahasans, well-off Natives – and anyone considered or accused to be a spy, to be subjected to intimidation, kidnapping, robbery, murder and organised massacres. Such attacks would continue throughout the course of the revolution, but were most present during the 1945–46 period, which is known as the Bersiap.

Estimates of the death toll of the Bersiap period vary from 3,500 to 30,000. NIOD concluded a Dutch casualty number of approximately 5,500 with possible higher numbers but not above 10,000. Estimates of the number of Indonesian fighters killed in the lead up to and during the Battle of Surabaya range from 6,300 to 15,000. The Japanese forces lost around 1,000 soldiers and the British forces registered 660 soldiers, mostly British Indians, as killed (with a similar number missing in action).

==== Formation of the Republican government ====
By the end of August 1945, a central Republican government had been established in Jakarta. It adopted a constitution drafted during the Japanese occupation by the Preparatory Committee for Indonesian Independence. With general elections yet to be held, a Central Indonesian National Committee (KNIP) was appointed to assist the President. Similar committees were established at provincial and regency levels.

Questions of allegiance immediately arose amongst indigenous rulers. Central Javanese principalities, for example, immediately declared themselves Republican, while many raja ('rulers') of the outer islands, who had been enriched from their support of the Dutch, were less enthusiastic. Such reluctance among many outer islands was sharpened by the radical, non-aristocratic, and sometimes Islamic nature of the Java-centric Republican leadership. Support did, however, come from South Sulawesi (including the King of Bone, who still recalled battles against the Dutch from early in the century), and from Makassarese and Bugis raja, who supported the Republican Governor of Jakarta, a Menadonese Christian. Many Balinese raja accepted Republican authority.

Fearing the Dutch would attempt to re-establish their authority over Indonesia, the new Republican Government and its leaders moved quickly to strengthen the fledgling administration. Within Indonesia, the newly formed government, although enthusiastic, was fragile and focused in Java (where focused at all). It was rarely and loosely in contact with the outer islands, which had more Japanese troops (particularly in Japanese naval areas), less sympathetic Japanese commanders, and fewer Republican leaders and activists. On 14 November 1945, a parliamentary form of government was established and Sjahrir was appointed prime minister.

In the week following the Japanese surrender, the Giyūgun (PETA) and Heiho groups were disbanded by the Japanese. (Note: Most PETA and Heiho members did not yet know about the declaration of independence.) Command structures and membership vital for a national army were consequently dismantled. Thus, rather than being formed from a trained, armed, and organised army, the Republican armed forces began to grow in September from usually younger, less trained groups built around charismatic leaders. Creating a rational military structure that was obedient to central authority from such disorganisation, was one of the major problems of the revolution, a problem that remains through to contemporary times. In the self-created Indonesian army, Japanese-trained Indonesian officers prevailed over those trained by the Dutch. A thirty-year-old former school teacher, Sudirman, was elected 'commander-in-chief' at the first meeting of Division Commanders in Yogyakarta on 12 November 1945.

=== Allied situation (1945) ===
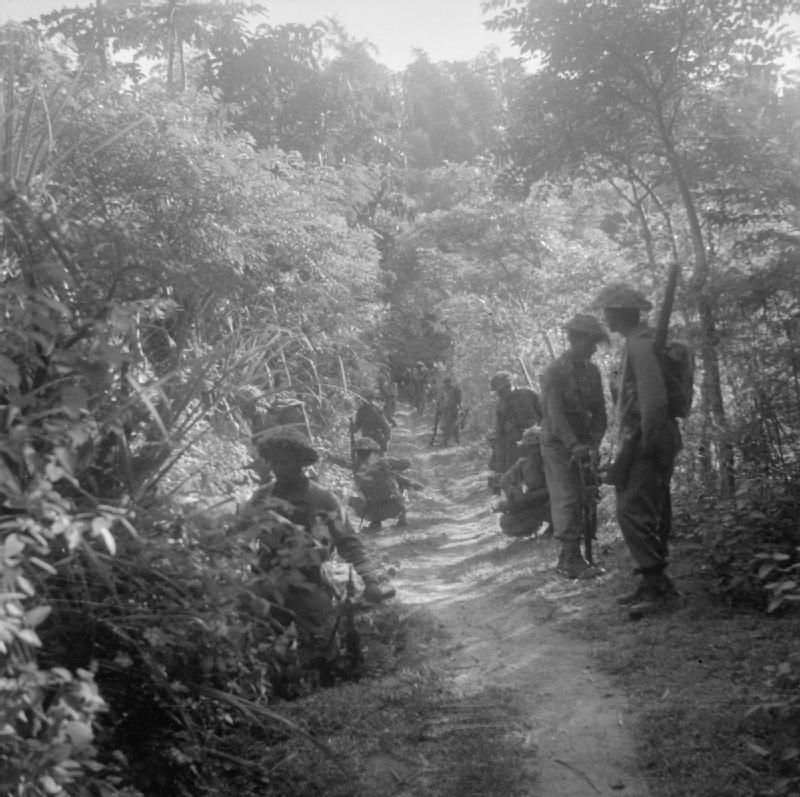
Indian and British troops move cautiously along a jungle track round the town of Gresik.

The Dutch accused Sukarno and Hatta of collaborating with the Japanese, and denounced the Republic as a creation of Japanese fascism. The Dutch East Indies administration had just received a ten million dollar loan from the United States to finance its return to Indonesia.

==== Allied occupation ====
The Netherlands, however, was critically weakened from World War II in Europe and did not return as a significant military force until early 1946. The Japanese and members of the Allied forces reluctantly agreed to act as caretakers. Australian forces of I Corps under general Leslie Morshead had landed in Borneo in May 1945, to destroy the Imperial Japanese forces stationed there, as well as maintaining order on the island until the Dutch could return. As US forces were focusing on the Japanese home islands, the archipelago was put under the jurisdiction of British Admiral Earl Louis Mountbatten, the Supreme Allied Commander, South East Asia Command. Allied enclaves already existed in Kalimantan (Indonesian Borneo), Morotai (Maluku) and parts of Irian Jaya; Dutch administrators had already returned to these areas. In the Japanese navy areas, the arrival of Allied troops quickly prevented revolutionary activities where Australian troops, followed by Dutch troops and administrators, took the Japanese surrender (except for Bali and Lombok). Due to the lack of strong resistance, two Australian Army divisions succeeded in occupying eastern Indonesia.

The British were charged with restoring order and civilian government in Java. The Dutch took this to mean pre-war colonial administration and continued to claim sovereignty over Indonesia. The British and Indian troops did not, however, land on Java to accept the Japanese surrender until late September 1945. Lord Mountbatten's immediate tasks included the repatriation of some 300,000 Japanese, and freeing prisoners of war. He did not want, nor did he have the resources, to commit his troops to a long struggle to regain Indonesia for the Dutch. The first British troops reached Jakarta in late September 1945, and arrived in the cities of Medan (North Sumatra), Padang (West Sumatra), Palembang (South Sumatra), Semarang (Central Java) and Surabaya (East Java) in October. In an attempt to avoid clashes with Indonesians, the British commander Lieutenant General Sir Philip Christison diverted soldiers of the former Dutch colonial army to eastern Indonesia, where Dutch reoccupation was proceeding smoothly. Tensions mounted as Allied troops entered Java and Sumatra; clashes broke out between Republicans and their perceived enemies, namely Dutch prisoners, Dutch colonial troops (KNIL), Chinese, Indo-Europeans and Japanese.

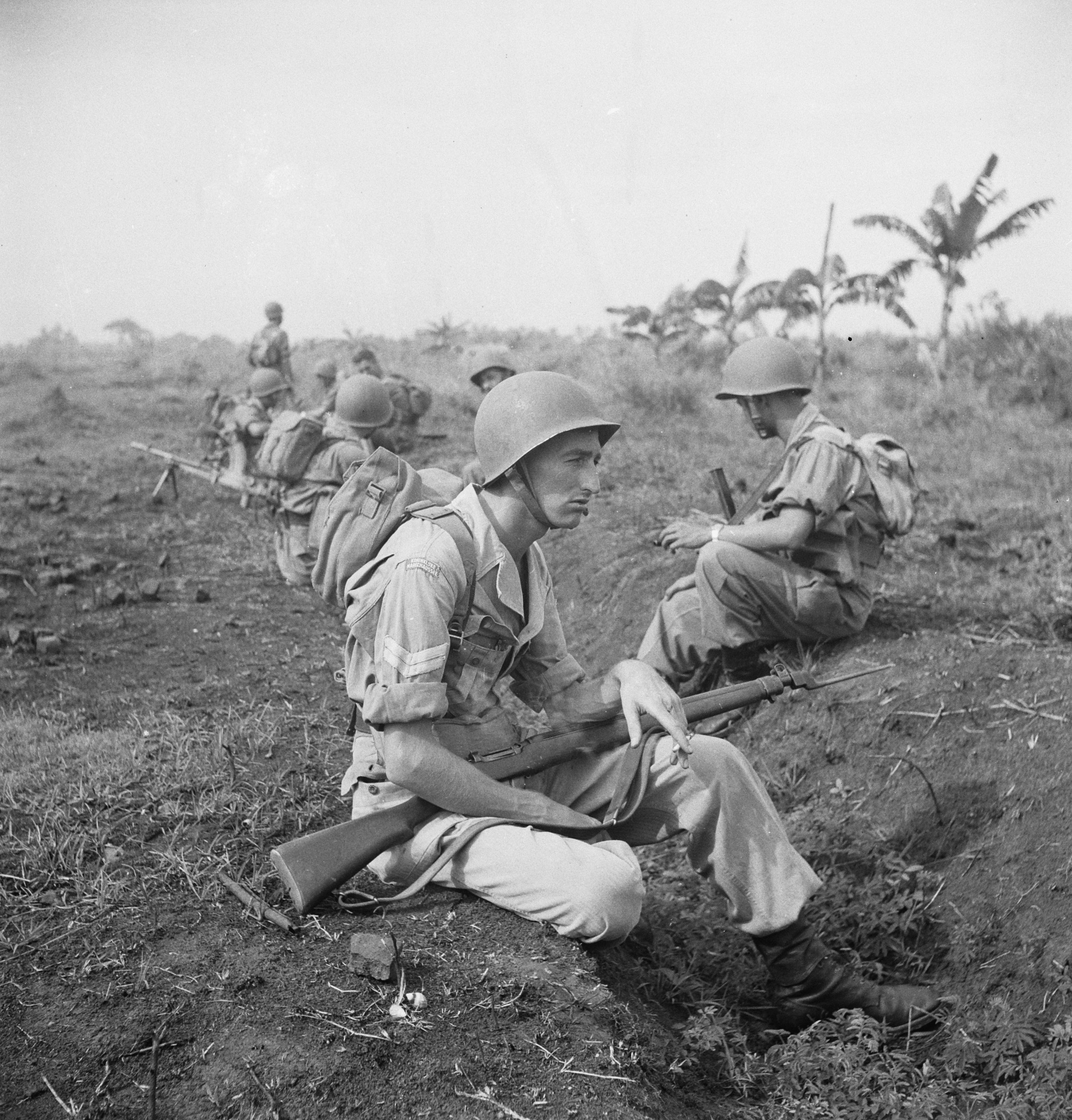
Dutch soldiers in the East Indies, 1946

The first stages of warfare were initiated in October 1945 when, in accordance with the terms of their surrender, the Japanese tried to re-establish the authority they had relinquished to Indonesians in the towns and cities. Japanese military police killed Republican pemuda in Pekalongan (Central Java) on 3 October, and Japanese troops drove Republican pemuda out of Bandung in West Java and handed the city to the British, but the fiercest fighting involving the Japanese was in Semarang. On 14 October, British forces began to occupy the city. Retreating Republican forces retaliated by killing between 130 and 300 Japanese prisoners they were holding. Five hundred Japanese and two thousand Indonesians had been killed and the Japanese had almost captured the city six days later when British forces arrived. The Allies repatriated the remaining Japanese troops and civilians to Japan, although about 1,000 elected to remain behind and later assisted Republican forces in fighting for independence.

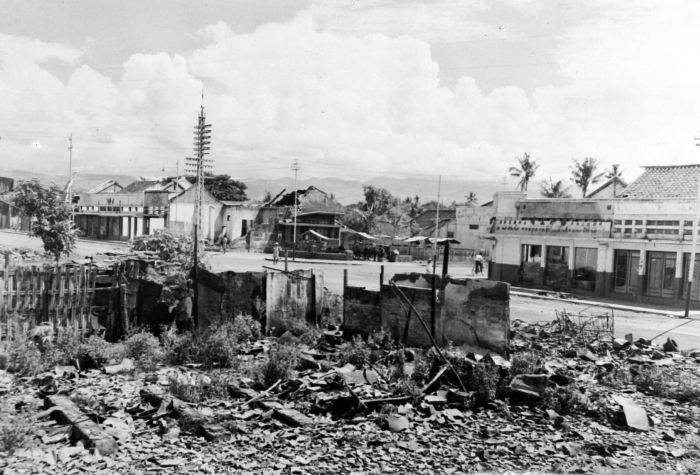
Destruction in Bandung's Chinese quarter

The British subsequently decided to evacuate the 10,000 Indo-Europeans and European internees in the volatile Central Java interior. British detachments sent to the towns of Ambarawa and Magelang encountered strong Republican resistance and used air attacks against the Indonesians. Sukarno arranged a ceasefire on 2 November, but by late November fighting had resumed and the British withdrew to the coast (refer Battle of Ambarawa). Republican attacks against Allied and alleged pro-Dutch civilians reached a peak in November and December, with 1,200 killed in Bandung as the pemuda returned to the offensive. In March 1946, departing Republicans responded to a British ultimatum for them to leave the city of Bandung by deliberately burning down much of the southern half of the city in what is popularly known in Indonesia as the "Bandung Sea of Fire".

==== Battle of Surabaya ====
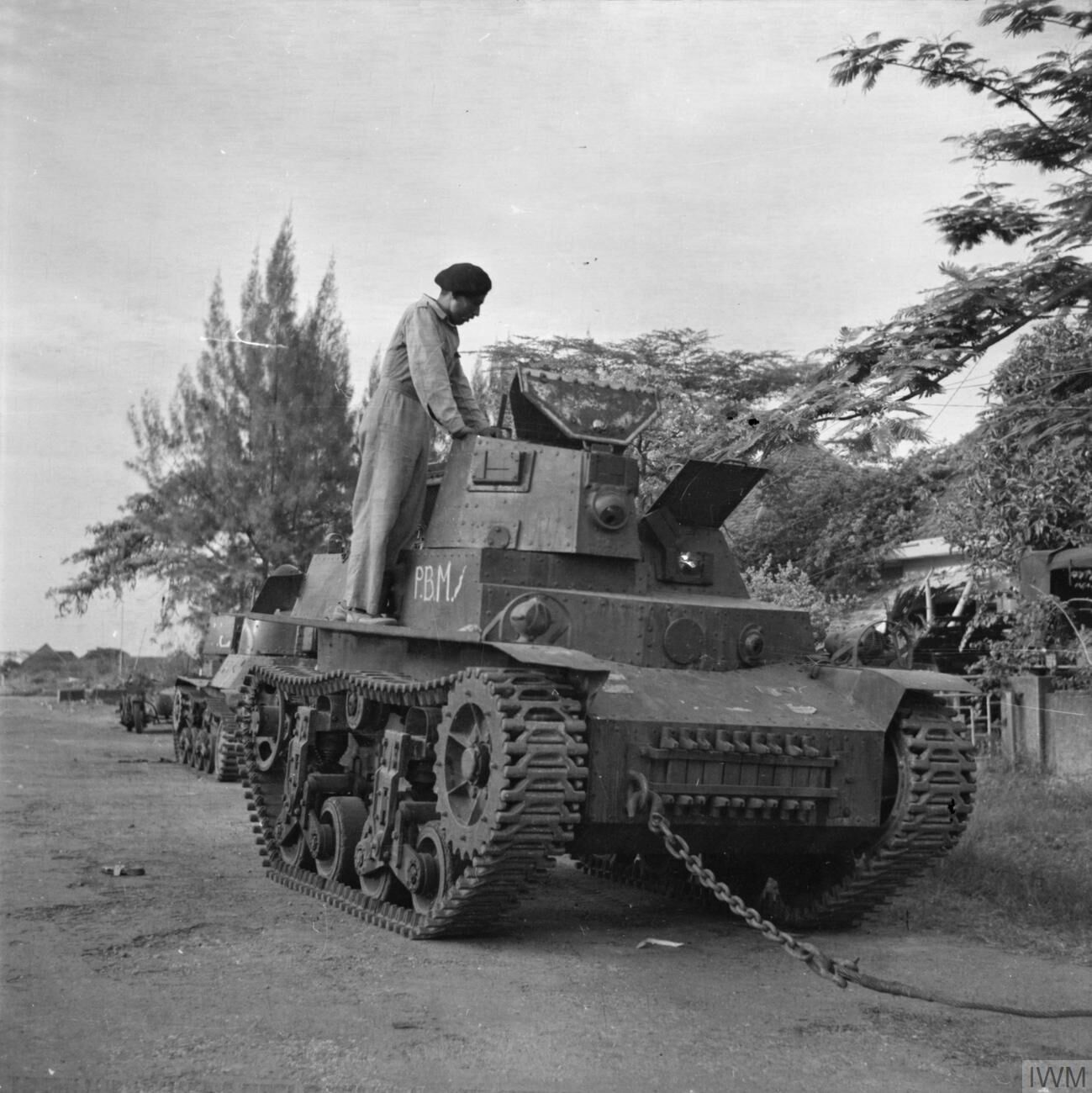
A soldier of an Indian armoured regiment examines a Marmon-Herrington CTLS light tank used by Indonesian nationalists and captured by British forces during the fighting in Surabaya.

The Battle of Surabaya was the heaviest and bloodiest single battle of the revolution and became a national symbol of Indonesian resistance. Pemuda groups in Surabaya, the second largest city in Indonesia, seized arms and ammunition from the Japanese and set up two new organisations; the Indonesia National Committee (KNI) and the People's Security Council (BKR). By the time the Allied forces arrived at the end of October 1945, the pemuda foothold in Surabaya city was described as "a strong unified fortress".

The city itself was in pandemonium. There was bloody hand-to-hand fighting on every street corner. Bodies were strewn everywhere. Decapitated, dismembered trunks lay piled one on top of the other ... Indonesians were shooting and stabbing and murdering wildly

— Sukarno

In September and October 1945 Europeans and pro-Dutch Eurasians were attacked and killed by Indonesian mobs. Ferocious fighting erupted when 6,000 British Indian troops landed in the city. Sukarno and Hatta negotiated a ceasefire between the Republicans and the British forces led by Brigadier Mallaby. Mallaby was killed on 30 October 1945 while he was travelling about Surabaya under a white flag to spread the news about the cease fire agreement and rescue some stranded Mahratta troops, despite being warned of the danger by Force 136 troops. Following the killing of Mallaby on 30 October, the British sent more troops into the city from 10 November under the cover of air attacks. Although the European forces largely captured the city in three days, the poorly armed Republicans fought on until 29 November and thousands died as the population fled to the countryside.

Despite the military defeat suffered by the Republicans and a loss of manpower and weaponry that would severely hamper Republican forces for the rest of the revolution, the battle and defence mounted by the Indonesians galvanised the nation in support of independence and helped garner international attention. For the Dutch, it removed any doubt that the Republic was a well-organised resistance with popular support. It also convinced Britain to lie on the side of neutrality in the revolution, and within a few years, Britain would support the Republican cause in the United Nations. The last British troops left Indonesia in November 1946, but by this time 55,000 Dutch troops had landed in Java.

==== Situation from Dutch landing on Java until Linggadjati (January–December 1946) ====
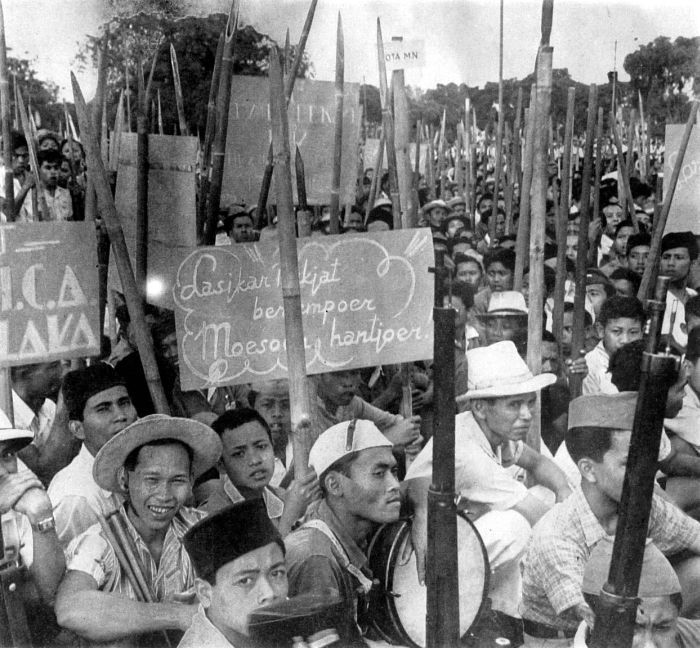
Javanese revolutionaries armed with bamboo spears and a few Japanese rifles, 1946

With British assistance, the Dutch landed their Netherlands Indies Civil Administration (NICA) forces in Jakarta and other key centres. Republican sources reported 8,000 deaths up to January 1946 in the defence of Jakarta, but they could not hold the city. The Republican leadership thus established themselves in the city of Yogyakarta with the crucial support of the new sultan, Sri Sultan Hamengkubuwono IX. Yogyakarta went on to play a leading role in the revolution, which would result in the city being granted its own Special Territory status. In Bogor, near Jakarta, and in Balikpapan in Kalimantan, Republican officials were imprisoned. In preparation for the Dutch occupation of Sumatra, its largest cities, Palembang and Medan, were bombed. In December 1946, Special Forces Depot (DST), led by commando and counter-insurgency expert Captain Raymond "Turk" Westerling, were accused of pacifying the southern Sulawesi region using arbitrary terror techniques, which were copied by other anti-Republicans. Westerling would target a village by herding them together, have soldiers search people's houses, shoot suspected Republicans in the head, as well as those who would refuse to name names, and sometimes additional victims beyond those suspected to be Republicans. There are disputes on how many were killed during this period, with some estimating as many as 3,000 while others estimate between 3,500 and 6,500. These war crimes were not officially recognized until 2015, when The Hague held the Netherlands responsible, leading to monetary reparations for the victims.

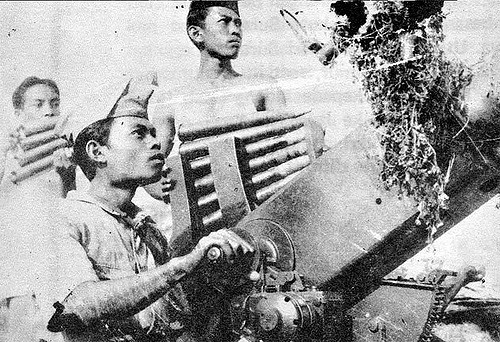
Indonesian pemuda operating an AA weapon during the Indonesian National Revolution, 1946

On Java and Sumatra, the Dutch found military success in cities and major towns, but they were unable to subdue the villages and countryside. On the outer islands (including Bali), Republican sentiment was not as strong, at least among the elite. They were consequently occupied by the Dutch with comparative ease, and autonomous states were set up by the Dutch. The largest, the State of East Indonesia (NIT), encompassed most of eastern Indonesia, and was established in December 1946, with its administrative capital in Makassar.

=== Diplomacy and major military engagements (1946–1949) ===
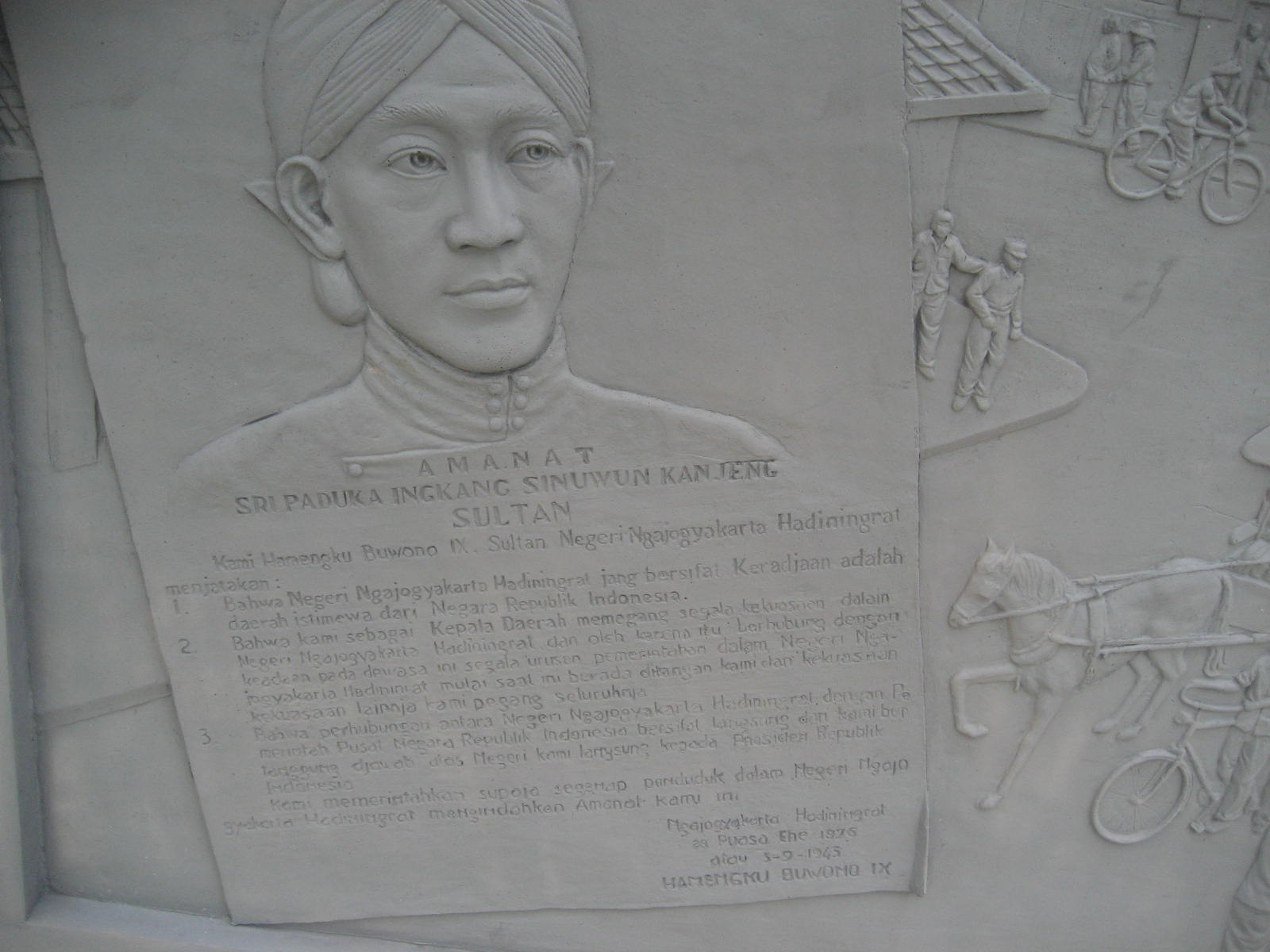
Inscription of King HB IX's mandate regarding Indonesian independence in the front wall of Yogya Kembali Monument

==== Linggardjati Agreement ====
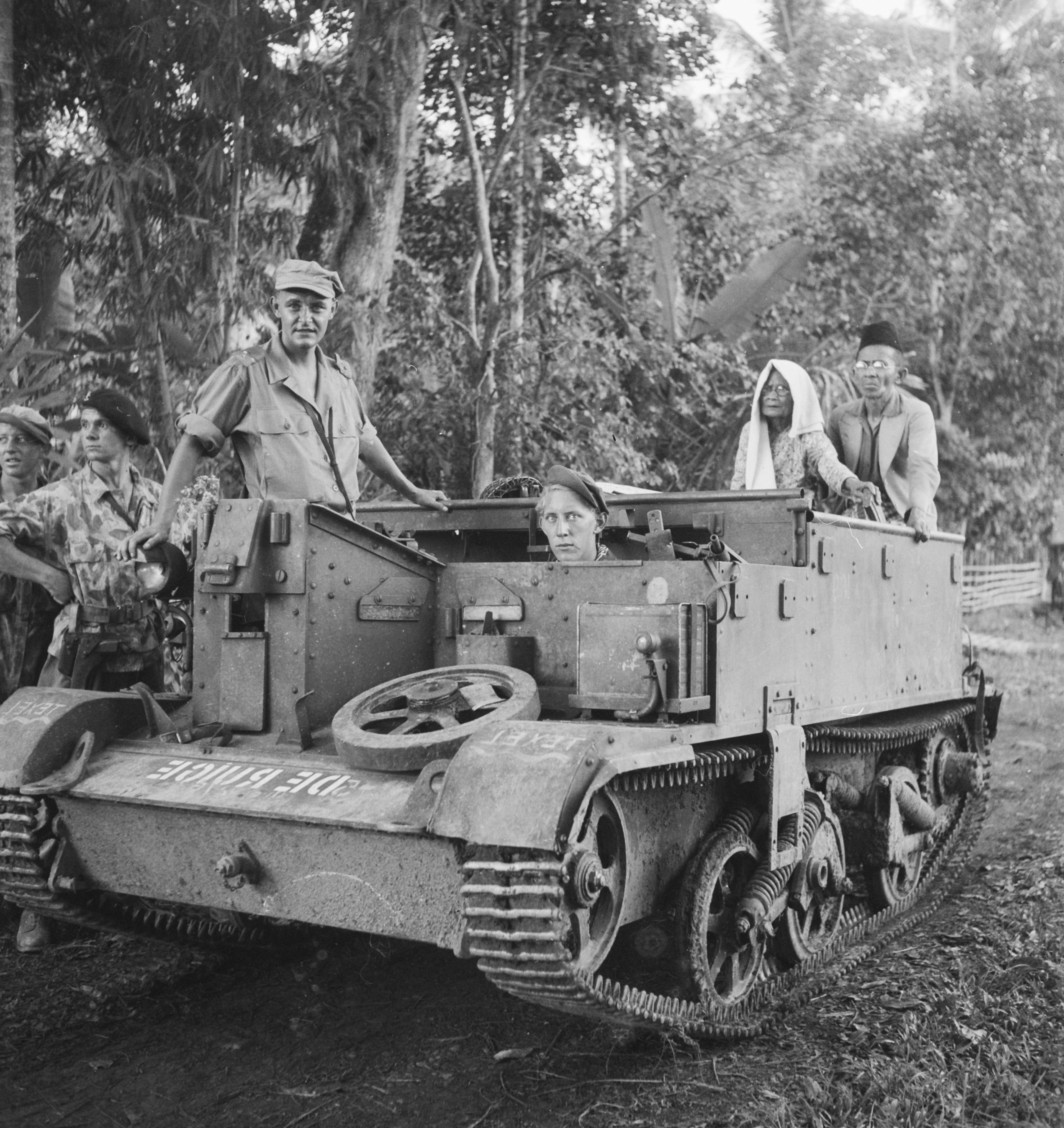
An old Indonesian couple with Dutch soldiers in a Bren Carrier

The Linggadjati Agreement or Linggardjati Agreement, brokered by the British and concluded in November 1946, saw the Netherlands recognise the Republic as the de facto authority over Java, Madura, and Sumatra. Both parties agreed to the formation of the United States of Indonesia by 1 January 1949, a semi-autonomous federal state with the monarch of the Netherlands at its head. The Republican-controlled Java and Sumatra would be one of its states, alongside areas that were generally under stronger Dutch influence, including southern Kalimantan, and the "Great East", which consisted of Sulawesi, Maluku, the Lesser Sunda Islands, and Western New Guinea. The Central National Committee of Indonesia (KNIP) did not ratify the agreement until February 1947, and neither the Republic nor the Dutch were satisfied with it. On 25 March 1947 the Lower House of the Dutch parliament ratified a stripped-down version of the treaty, which was not accepted by the Republic. Both sides soon accused the other of violating the agreement.

... [the Republic] became increasingly disorganised internally; party leaders fought with party leaders; governments were over thrown and replaced by others; armed groups acted on their own in local conflicts; certain parts of the Republic never had contact with the centre – they just drifted along in their own way.

The whole situation deteriorated to such an extent that the Dutch Government was obliged to decide that no progress could be made before law and order were restored sufficiently to make intercourse between the different parts of Indonesia possible, and to guarantee the safety of people of different political opinions.

— former East Indies Governor H. J. van Mook's justification for the first Dutch "police action"

==== Operation Product ====
At midnight on 20 July 1947, the Dutch launched a major military offensive called Operatie Product, with the aim of regaining control of economically lucrative areas in Java and Sumatra and deep ports in Java, thus covering the cost of the ~120,000-strong Dutch military presence. Claiming violations of the Linggajati Agreement, the Dutch euphemistically described the campaign as "police actions" to restore law and order. In the offensive, Dutch forces drove Republican troops out of parts of Sumatra, and East and West Java. The Republicans were confined to the Yogyakarta region of Java.

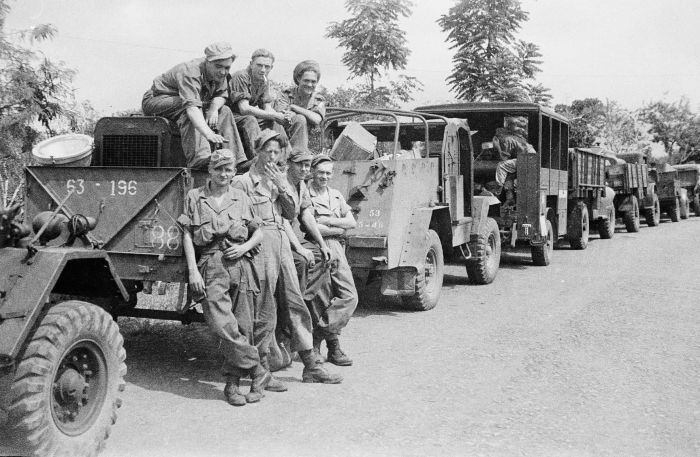
A Dutch military column during Operation Product

International reaction to the Dutch actions was negative. Neighbouring Australia and newly independent India were particularly active in supporting the Republic's cause in the UN, as were the Soviet Union and, most significantly, the United States. Dutch ships continued to be boycotted from loading and unloading by Australian waterside workers, a blockade that began in September 1945. The United Nations Security Council became directly involved in the conflict, establishing a Committee of Good Office (CGO, known in Indonesia as Komite Tiga Negara, KTN, but not confused with Unilateral Committee.) to sponsor further negotiations, making the Dutch diplomatic position particularly difficult. A ceasefire, called for by UNSC resolution 27, was ordered by the Dutch and Sukarno on 4 August 1947.

==== Renville Agreement & Subsequent Ceasefire ====
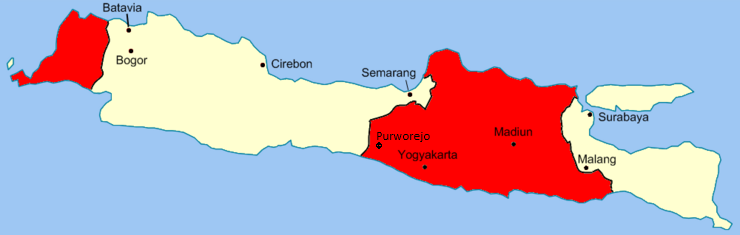
The Van Mook line in Java. Areas in red were under Republican control.

The United Nations Security Council brokered the Renville Agreement in an attempt to rectify the collapsed Linggadjati Agreement. The agreement was ratified in January 1948 and recognised a cease-fire along the so-called 'Van Mook line' or 'Renville line'; an artificial line which connected the most advanced Dutch tanks' positions. Many Republican positions, however, were still intact behind the Dutch lines. Many pro-Republican militias & supporters, particularly laborers, peasants, and student troops, were unable to relocate, and were forced to remain behind the Renville Line. The agreement also required referendums to be held on the political future of the Dutch-held areas. The apparent reasonableness of Republicans garnered much important American goodwill.

The Indonesian Republic faced economic hardship due to losing economically productive areas and the continued naval blockade and newly-erected land blockades on the Renville line which led to insufficient availability of not only arms, but also food, clothing, medicine, mail, books, magazines and material to service and repair transportation, as well as overpopulation due to people fleeing from Dutch advances in Operation Product. This economic hardship was paired with a political crisis spurred by accepting the terms of the Renville Agreement, as well as internal conflicts between Republicans and other Indonesian nationalists, which fed fuel to what would later become the Madiun Affair, and Darul Islam Rebellion.

Diplomatic efforts between the Netherlands and the Republic continued throughout 1948 and 1949. Political pressures, both domestic and international, hindered Dutch attempts to decide upon objectives. Similarly, Republican leaders faced great difficulty in persuading their people to accept diplomatic concessions. By July 1948 negotiations were in deadlock and the Netherlands pushed unilaterally towards Van Mook's federal Indonesia concept. The new federal states of South Sumatra and East Java were created, although neither had a viable support base. The Netherlands set up the Bijeenkomst voor Federaal Overleg (BFO) (or Federal Consultative Assembly), a body comprising the leadership of the federal states, and charged with the formation of a United States of Indonesia and an interim government by the end of 1948. The Dutch plans, however, had no place for the Republic unless it accepted a minor role already defined for it. Later plans included Java and Sumatra but dropped all mention of the Republic. The main sticking point in the negotiations was the balance of power between the Netherlands High Representative (successor to office of Governor-General) and the Republican forces.

Mutual distrust between the Netherlands and the Republic hindered negotiations. Indonesia feared another major Dutch offensive. Meanwhile, the Dutch objected to continued pro-Republican activities on the Dutch side of the Renville line.

In February 1948, the Siliwangi Battalion of the Republican Army, led by Abdul Harris Nasution, marched from Central Java to West Java; the relocation was intended to ease internal Republican tensions involving the Battalion in the Surakarta area. The Battalion, however, clashed with Dutch troops while crossing Mount Slamet, and the Dutch believed it was part of a systematic troop movement across the Van Mook Line. The fear of such incursions actually succeeding, along with apparent Republican undermining of the Dutch-established Pasundan state and negative reports, led to the Dutch leadership increasingly seeing itself as losing control.

==== Operation Kraai and General Offensive (Serangan Oemoem) ====
We have been attacked .... The Dutch government have betrayed the cease-fire agreement. All the Armed Forces will carry out the plans which have been decided on to confront the Dutch attack

— General Sudirman, broadcast from his sickbed

Frustrated at negotiations with the Republic and believing it weakened by both the Darul Islam and Madiun insurgencies, the Dutch launched a military offensive on 19 December 1948 which it termed 'Operatie Kraai' (Operation Crow). By the following day it had conquered the city of Yogyakarta, the location of the temporary Republican capital. By the end of December, all major Republican held cities in Java and Sumatra were in Dutch hands. The Republican president, vice-president, and all but six Republic of Indonesia ministers were captured by Dutch troops and exiled on Bangka Island off the east coast of Sumatra. In areas surrounding Yogyakarta and Surakarta, Republican forces refused to surrender and continued to wage a guerrilla war under the leadership of Republican military chief of staff General Sudirman, who had escaped the Dutch offensives. An emergency Republican government, the Pemerintahan Darurat Republik Indonesia (PDRI), was established in West Sumatra. In Yogyakarta, Dutch scoured the archives of Indonesian republican government and its leaders, seizing many documents, subsequently known as the Djogdja Documenten, which were returned to Indonesia from the 1970s to the 1990s.

Although Dutch forces conquered the towns and cities in Republican heartlands on Java and Sumatra, they could not control villages and the countryside. Republican troops and militia led by Lt. Colonel (later President) Suharto attacked Dutch positions in Yogyakarta at dawn on 1 March 1949. The Dutch were expelled from the city for six hours but reinforcements were brought in from the nearby cities of Ambarawa and Semarang that afternoon. Indonesian fighters retreated at 12:00 pm and the Dutch re-entered the city. The Indonesian attack, later known in Indonesia as Serangan Oemoem (new spelling: Serangan Umum '1 March General Offensive'), is commemorated by a large monument in Yogyakarta. A large-scale attack against Dutch troops in Surakarta on 10 August the same year resulted in republican forces holding the city for two days.

Once again, international opinion of the Dutch military campaigns was one of outrage, significantly in both the United Nations and the United States. U.S. Secretary of State George C. Marshall threatened to stop all of the economic aid program to the Netherlands unless they immediately withdrew from Indonesia and transferred all of the sovereignty to Indonesia. In January 1949, the United Nations Security Council passed a resolution demanding the reinstatement of the Republican government. United States aid specifically earmarked for Dutch Indonesia was immediately cancelled and pressure mounted within the US Congress for all United States aid to be cut off. This included Marshall Plan funds vital for Dutch post-World War II rebuilding that had so far totalled $US 1 billion. The Netherlands Government had spent an amount equivalent to almost half of this funding their campaigns in Indonesia. That United States aid could be used to fund "a senile and ineffectual imperialism" encouraged many key voices in the United States – including those amongst the US Republican Party and from within American churches and NGOs – to speak out in support of Indonesian independence. In protest, the Pasundan cabinet, along with the cabinet of the largest federal state, the State of East Indonesia, resigned, to the embarrassment of the Dutch, who had planned a conference to discuss the form of the federal Indonesian state.

==== Indian role ====
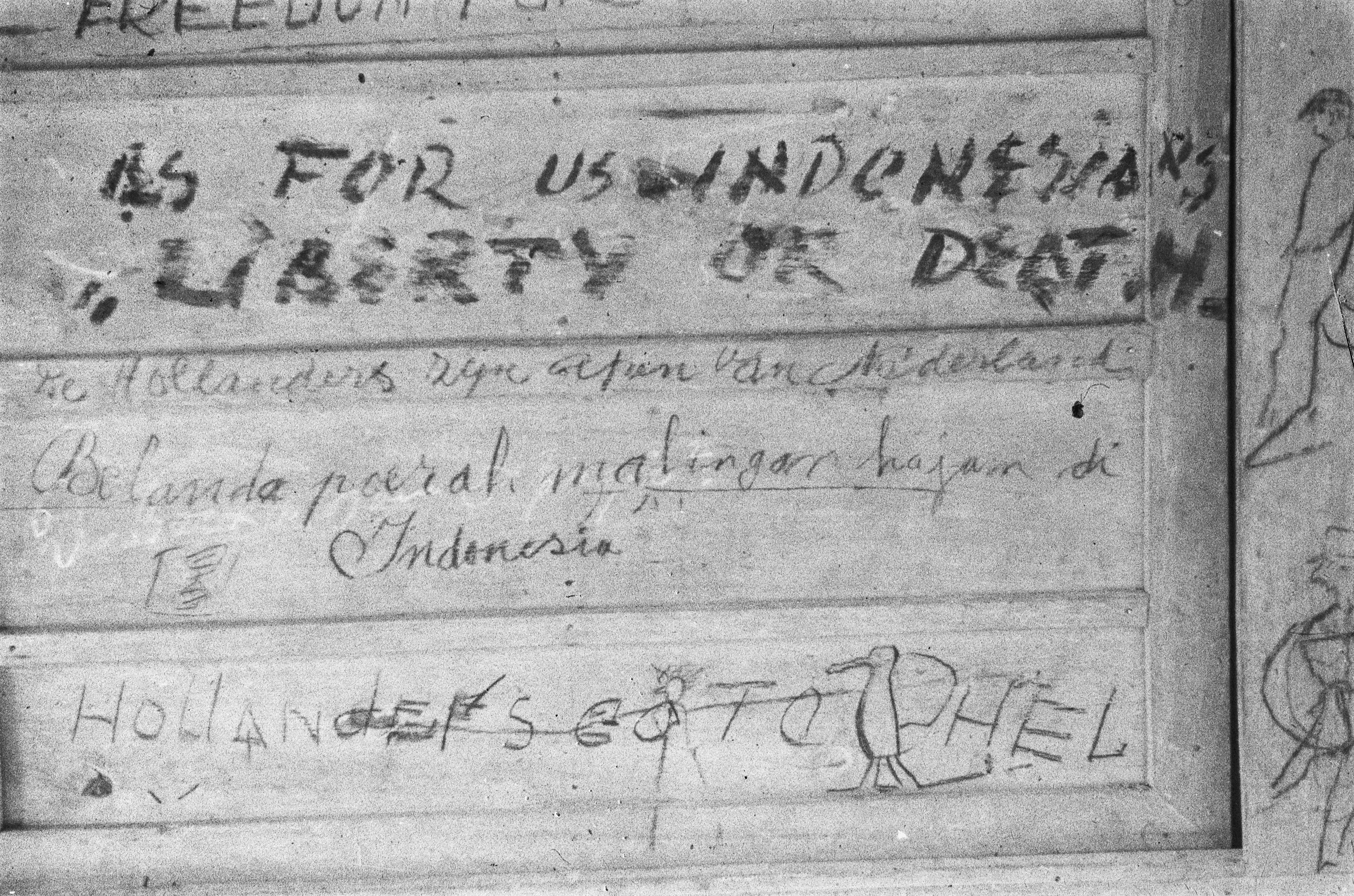
Graffiti in Java, 1948: "Freedom is for us Indonesians", "Liberty or Death", "Hollanders go to Hel"

Indonesia had engaged with many members of the Indian Freedom struggle, with Sukarno and Hatta writing special articles in The Hindu and the National Herald to advocate their cause. The British Empire had assisted the Dutch early in the conflict however, it departed from the war by November 1946. Following a transfer of power from British hands to an Interim government in September 1946, India issued orders to call back forces that had been deployed by Britain to quell the uprising. About 600 Muslims in the newly formed Indian Army decided to fight in favor of Indonesian fighters. The Indian Public was outraged when the Dutch shot down an Indian DC-3 plane carrying Red Cross supplies from Singapore to Jakarta killing nine people aboard. All India Radio also started broadcasting in Bahasa Indonesia. This also continued past Indian Independence in August 1947, with the Indian Armed forces extending their support to this corps.

The Indian Air Force and multiple Indian-owned civilian planes defied the air blockade over Indonesia, imposed by the Dutch, during 1947 to 1949 and provided supplies and military equipment to the Indonesian freedom fighters. India also stopped the Dutch from using their air space after July 1947. Indian Leader Jawaharlal Nehru ordered a covert operation on 24th July 1947 which involved Indian forces rescuing prime minister Sutan Syahrir and Sukarno out of Indonesia at the beginning of Operation Product .His aides Biju Patnaik and Gyanwati Patnaik carried out this task. In 1948, India invited Indonesians to form a government-in-exile in India if needed. India also started raising the matter at the United Nations.In 1949, Nehru led international resistance by organising a fifteen nation conference, along with Australia, against the Dutch. It concluded the Dutch military action on Indonesia violated UN charter.

=== Internal turmoil ===
The internal turmoil happened was called as social revolutions and insurgencies of Communist and Islamist. It is argued there were common causes because of general similarity of these separated actions. The common causes are extreme polarization of pergerakan and aristocrat groups, the harshness of Japanese requirement for labour and rice; the vacuum of central authority; powerful Islamic sentiment for mass mobilization; and activity of minute semi-underground revolutionary cadres (commonly communist).

==== Social revolutions ====
The so-called 'social revolutions' following the independence proclamation were challenges to the Dutch-established Indonesian social order, and to some extent a result of the resentment against Japanese-imposed policies. Across the country, people rose up against traditional aristocrats and village heads and attempted to exert popular ownership of land and other resources. The majority of the social revolutions ended quickly; in most cases the challenges to the social order were quashed, although in East Sumatra, the sultanates were overthrown and there were mass killings of members of the aristocratic families.

Wealth inequality and few other reasons fueled long-held grudges of indigenous (pribumi} Indonesians toward local aristocrats, Dutch, and perceived outsiders. Those grudges turn into violence when opportunity arises. A culture of violence rooted in the deep conflicts that split the countryside during the revolution would repeatedly erupt throughout the whole second half of the 20th century. Violence was one of the many lessons learned during the Japanese occupation, and figures identified as 'feudal', including kings, regents, or simply the wealthy, were often attacked and sometimes beheaded. Rape became a weapon against 'feudal' women. In the coastal sultanates of Eastern Sumatra, for example, sultans and others whose authority had been shored up by the Dutch, were attacked in March 1946, shortly after the Japanese left. Many pro-Dutch ulèebalang (secular local lords & aristocratic administrators of Aceh), who had been the foundation of Dutch rule, were driven out captured, and few were executed during local civil war, and its place was taken over by pro-Republican religious leaders. (ulama). Meanwhile, monarchical officials in Surakarta was kidnapped by anti-monarchist movement which led to the freezing and abolition of the special region.

Many Indonesians lived in fear and uncertainty, particularly a significant proportion of the population who supported the Dutch or who remained under Dutch control. The popular revolutionary cry 'Freedom or Death' was often interpreted to justify killings under claimed Republican authority. Traders were often in particularly difficult positions. On the one hand, they were pressured by Republicans to boycott all sales to the Dutch; on the other hand, Dutch police could be merciless in their efforts to stamp out smugglers on which the Republican economy depended. In some areas, the term kedaulatan rakyat ('exercising the sovereignty of the people') – which is mentioned in the preamble of the Constitution and used by pemuda to demand pro-active policies from leaders – came to be used not only in the demanding of free goods, but also to justify extortion and robbery. Chinese merchants, in particular, were often forced to keep their goods at artificially low prices under threat of death.

==== Communist and Islamist insurgencies ====
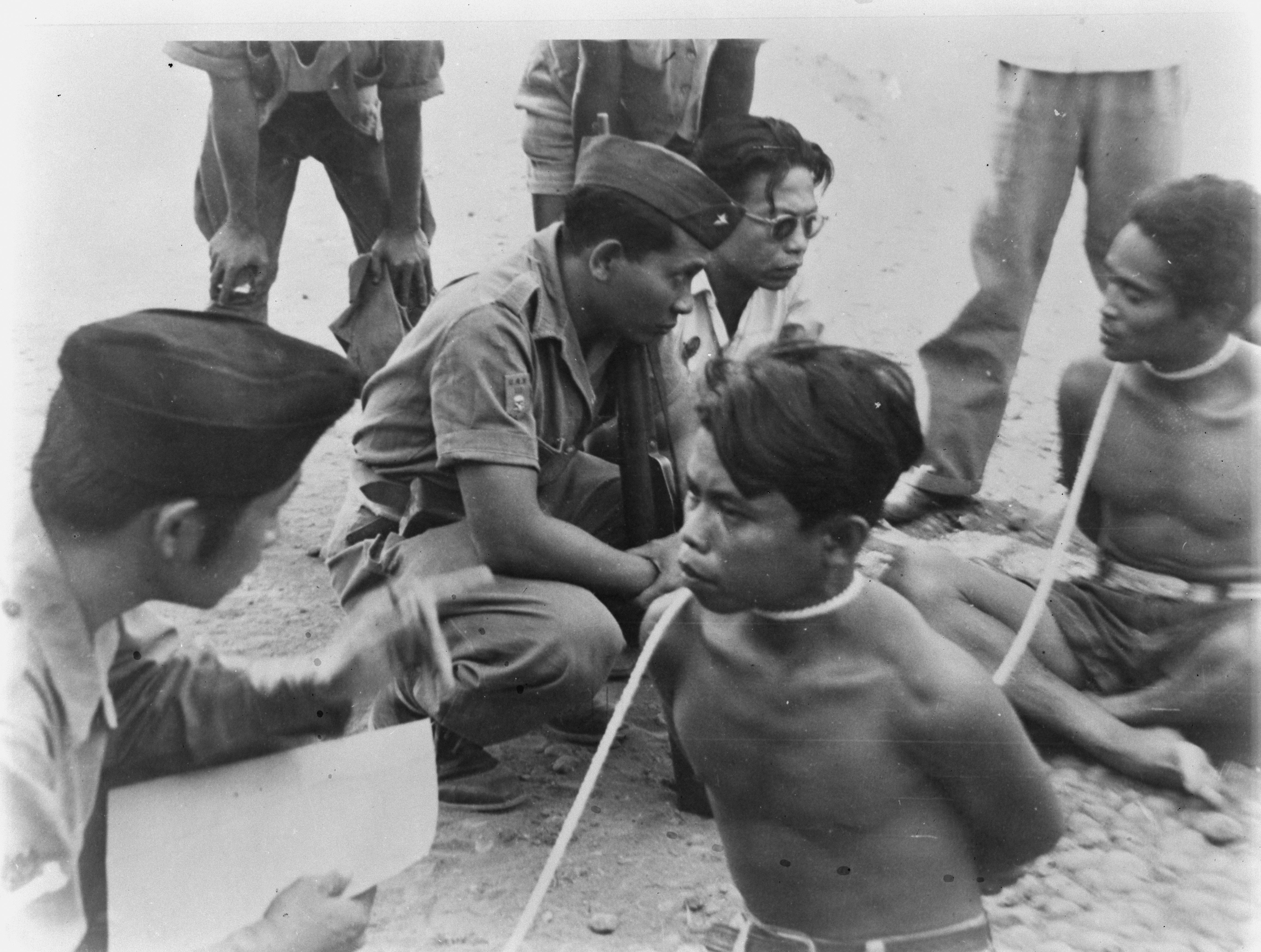
Two men with rope around their necks are handcuffed by TNI officers in September 1948 in Madiun, Indonesia.

On 18 September 1948, an 'Indonesian Soviet Republic' was declared in Madiun, east of Yogyakarta, by members of the PKI and the Indonesian Socialist Party (PSI). Judging the time right for a proletarian uprising, they intended it to be a rallying point for revolt against "Sukarno-Hatta, the slaves of the Japanese and America". Madiun however was won back by Republican forces within a few weeks and the insurgency leader, Musso, killed. Ario Soerjo, the governor of East Java, as well as several police officers and religious leaders, were killed by the rebels. This ended a distraction for the revolution, and it turned vague American sympathies based on anti-colonial sentiments into diplomatic support. Internationally, the Republic was now seen as being staunchly anti-communist and a potential ally in the emerging global Cold War between the American-led 'free world' and the Soviet-led bloc.

Members of the Republican Army who had come from Islamic militias Hizbullah and Sabilillah felt betrayed by the Indonesian Government for ratifying the Renville Agreement – therefore recognising many areas behind the van Mook Line as de jure Dutch. In May 1948, they declared a break-away regime, the Negara Islam Indonesia (Indonesian Islamic State), better known as Darul Islam. Led by an Islamic mystic, Sekarmadji Maridjan Kartosoewirjo, Darul Islam sought to establish Indonesia as an Islamic theocracy. At the time, the Republican Government did not respond, as they were focused on the threat from the Dutch. Some leaders of Masjumi sympathized with the rebellion. After the Republic regained all territories in 1950, the government took the Darul Islam threat seriously, especially after some provinces declared that they had joined Darul Islam. The last group of rebels was put down in 1962.

=== Transfer of sovereignty ===
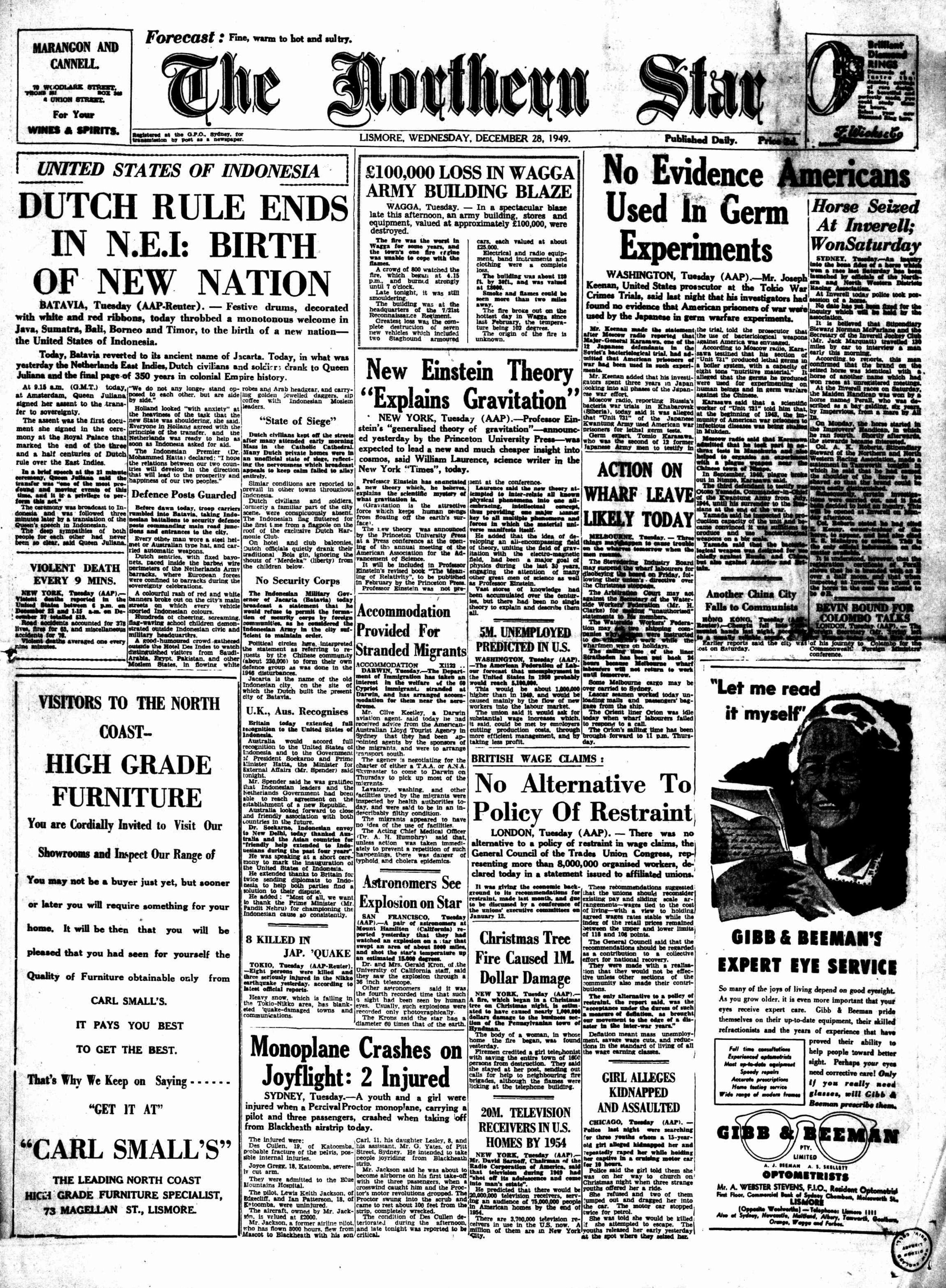
Australia's The Northern Star newspaper regarding the independence of Indonesia date 28 December 1949

Millions upon millions flooded the sidewalks, the roads. They were crying, cheering, screaming "... Long live Bung Karno ..." They clung to the sides of the car, the hood, the running boards. They grabbed at me to kiss my fingers.

Soldiers beat a path for me to the topmost step of the big white palace. There I raised both hands high. A stillness swept over the millions. "Alhamdulillah – Thank God," I cried. "We are free"

— Sukarno's recollections of independence achieved

The resilience of Indonesian Republican resistance and active international diplomacy set world opinion against the Dutch efforts to re-establish their colony. The second 'police action' was a diplomatic disaster for the Dutch cause. The newly appointed United States Secretary of State Dean Acheson pushed the Netherlands government into negotiations earlier recommended by the United Nations but until then defied by the Netherlands. The Dutch–Indonesian Round Table Conference was held in The Hague from 23 August 1949 to 2 November 1949 between the Republic, the Netherlands, and the Dutch-created federal states. The Netherlands agreed to recognise Indonesian sovereignty over a new federal state known as the 'United States of Indonesia' (RUSI). It would include all the territory of the former Dutch East Indies with the exception of Dutch New Guinea; sovereignty over which it was agreed would be retained by the Netherlands until further negotiations with Indonesia within a year of the transfer of sovereignty. The other issue on which Indonesia gave concessions was paying the Netherlands East Indies debt which amounted to 4.5 billion guilders. This amount would mean, Indonesia paid for the colonial government expenses of "Politionele acties". Sovereignty was formally transferred on 27 December 1949, and the new state was immediately recognised by the United States of America.

The United States of Indonesia, December 1949 – the Republic of Indonesia is shown in red

Republican-controlled Java and Sumatra together formed a single state in the seven-state, nine-territory RUSI federation, but accounted for almost half its population. The other fifteen 'federal' states and territories had been created by the Netherlands since 1945. These entities were dissolved into the Republic over the first half of 1950. An abortive anti-Republic coup in Bandung and Jakarta by Westerling's Legion of the Just Ruler (APRA) on 23 January 1950 resulted in the dissolution of the populous Pasundan state in West Java, thus quickening the dissolution of the federal structure. Colonial soldiers, who were largely Ambonese, clashed with Republican troops in Makassar during the Makassar Uprising in April 1950. The predominantly Christian Ambonese were from one of the few regions with pro-Dutch sentiments and they were suspicious of the Javanese Muslim-dominated Republic, whom they unfavourably regarded as leftists. On 25 April 1950, an independent Republic of South Maluku (RMS) was proclaimed in Ambon but this was suppressed by Republican troops during a campaign from July to November. With the state of East Sumatra now being the only federal state remaining, it too folded and fell in line with the unitary Republic. On 17 August 1950, the fifth anniversary of his declaration of Indonesian independence, Sukarno proclaimed the Republic of Indonesia as a unitary state.

== Impact and casualties ==
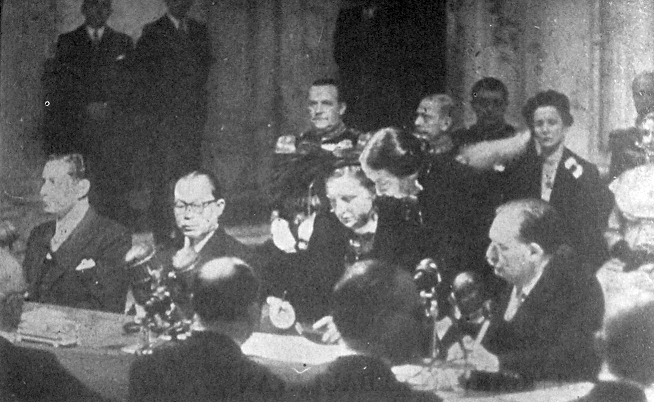
Indonesian Vice-president Hatta and Dutch Queen Juliana at the signing ceremony which took place at the Royal Palace of Amsterdam. With the treaty signed, the Dutch officially recognised Indonesian sovereignty.

Although there is no accurate account of how many Indonesians died, it was in far greater numbers than the Europeans. Estimates of Indonesian deaths in fighting and civilians range from 97,421 to 100,000. A total of 980 British soldiers were killed or went missing in Java and Sumatra in 1945 and 1946, most of them Indian soldiers. More than 4,000 Dutch soldiers lost their lives in Indonesia between 1945 and 1949. Many Japanese died; while it is unknown how many died, only about half of whom died in actual combat, the rest killed in rampages by Indonesians. Seven million people were displaced on Java and Sumatra. Based on demographic data, historian Pierre van der Eng estimated a demographic gap of around 2.4 million people in Indonesia during the entire 1940s, including the period of the Japanese occupation of the Dutch East Indies, and the Indonesian National Revolution. Van der Eng states that conflict led to significant ramifications for Indonesians outside of direct violence, such as widespread famine, disease and a lowered fertility rate. According to the official website of Indonesian veterans, there were 863,432 people who joined the struggle for Indonesian independence and this included those who were members of the militia, police, intelligence and auxiliary and as of 2023, there are still 25,676 Indonesian National Revolution veterans alive. According to the official Netherlands veterans website, there are around 5,000 veterans who were deployed to the Dutch East Indies still alive, which also includes former KNIL members.

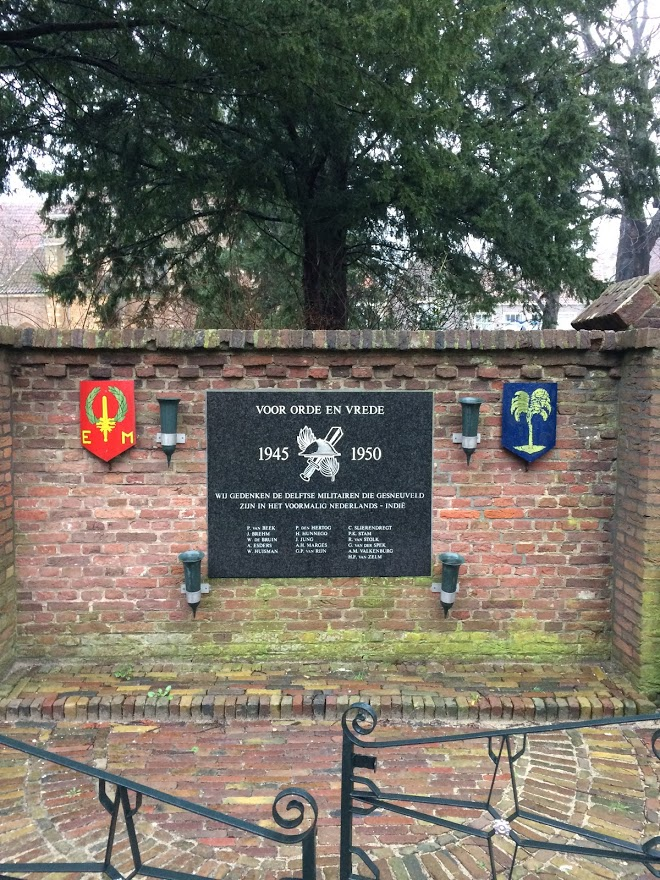
Memorial to Dutch losses in the war at the Prinsenhof in Delft

The revolution had direct effects on economic conditions; shortages were common, particularly food, clothing and fuel. There were in effect two economies – the Dutch and the Republican – both of which had to simultaneously rebuild after World War II and survive the disruptions of the revolution. The Republic had to set up all necessities of life, ranging from 'postage stamps, army badges, and train tickets' whilst subject to Dutch trade blockades. Confusion and ruinous inflationary surges resulted from competing currencies; Japanese, new Dutch money, and Republican currencies were all used, often concurrently. The Indonesian government was saddled with significant debt, slowing development, with last remaining payment for Dutch–Indonesian Round Table Conference was made in the form of annual payment, with 1% annual interest rate since 1973, was made in 2002. It also meant that while Dutch government enjoyed rebuilding loans under Marshall plans, ironically the Indonesian people have to pay for the crimes committed by the Dutch against the Indonesians

Indonesian independence was secured through a blend of both diplomacy and force. Despite their ill-discipline raising the prospect of anarchy, without pemuda confronting foreign and Indonesian colonial forces, Republican diplomatic efforts would have been futile. The revolution is the turning point of modern Indonesian history, and it has provided the reference point and validation for the country's major political trends that continue to the present day. It gave impetus to communism in the country, to militant nationalism, to Sukarno's 'guided democracy', to political Islam, the origins of the Indonesian army and its role in Indonesian power, the country's constitutional arrangements, and the centralism of power in Indonesia.

The revolution destroyed a colonial administration ruled from the other side of the world, and dismantled with it the raja, seen by many as obsolete and powerless. Also, it relaxed the rigid racial and social categorisations of colonial Indonesia. Tremendous energies and aspirations were created amongst Indonesians; a new creative surge was seen in writing and art, as was a great demand for education and modernisation. It did not, however, significantly improve the economic or political fortune of the population's poverty-stricken peasant majority; only a few Indonesians were able to gain a larger role in commerce, and hopes for democracy were dashed within a decade.

== Foreign responses to the Indonesian revolution ==
=== Empire of Japan ===
On 7 September 1944, Japanese prime minister Kuniaki Koiso proclaimed that the Japanese government "would give independence to the East Indies in the near future." Following Kuniaki's statement, Indonesia's national movement for independence grew more popular. Facing defeat by Allied forces (World War II), Japan "moved toward" awarding Indonesia its independence; in reality, the government had no interest in supporting the movement.

Following the end of the Japanese occupation of the Dutch East Indies, many Japanese remained in Indonesia—some joining Indonesian military and paramilitary organisations, directly refusing the orders of the Imperial Japanese Army. Though they did not support Indonesian independence under Japan's colonial administration, Japanese authorities in Jakarta supported Sukarno's rise to leadership, their way of belligerently opposing the Allies.

=== United States ===
Coverage of the Indonesian declaration of independence and subsequent national revolution was scarce in the United States; many outlets only focused on the countries where U.S. soldiers saw fighting. The New York Times relied on the United Press International and Associated Press for its reporting—the Times incorrectly referred to Sutan Sjahrir as "Sultan Charir," and to Sukarno with names such as "Mr. Achmed Soekarno," "Mr. So Ekarno," and "Mr. So Ekardo."

== Dutch apologies ==
In 2013, the Netherlands government apologised for the violence used against the Indonesian people. In 2016, Dutch Foreign Minister Bert Koenders apologized for a massacre by Dutch troops of 400 Indonesian villagers in 1947. During a state visit to Indonesia in March 2020, King Willem-Alexander made a surprise apology for "excessive violence" by Dutch troops. In 2022, Mark Rutte, the prime minister of the Netherlands made an apology for violence committed against the Indonesians.

On 17 February 2022, a major Dutch historical review was released, titled Independence, Decolonization, Violence and War in Indonesia, 1945–1950. The research was done by three institutions: Royal Netherlands Institute of Southeast Asian and Caribbean Studies (KITLV), Netherlands Institute for Military History (NIMH) and NIOD Institute for War, Holocaust and Genocide Studies. The review concluded that the Netherlands had used systematic and excessive violence during the war. According to the review, "The use of extreme violence by the Dutch armed forces was not only widespread, but often deliberate, too" and "was condoned at every level: political, military and legal." On the same day, the Dutch Prime Minister Mark Rutte apologized for the atrocities committed by the Dutch during the war and also for the failure of past Dutch governments to acknowledge it.

== Battles of the revolution ==
- Dayak Desa War (1945–1948)
- Kalimantan Physical Revolution (1945–1950)
- Battle of Maguwo (2 October 1945)
- Battle of Kotabaru (7 October 1945)
- Battle of Medan (13 October 1945 – April 1946)
- Battle of Semarang (15–19 October 1945)
- Kali Bekasi incident (19 October 1945)
- Battle of Ambarawa (20 October – 16 December 1945)
- Battle of Surabaya (27 October – 2 December 1945)
- Battle of Padang Area (17 November 1945 – September 1946)
- Kolaka incident (19 November 1945)
- Burning of Bekasi (29 November – 13 December 1945)
- Cumbok affair (2 December 1945 – 16 January 1946)
- Battle of Bojong Kokosan (9–12 December 1945)
- Battle of Kumai (14 January 1946)
- Lengkong incident (25 January 1946)
- Battle of Petaling (14 February 1946)
- Bandung Sea of Fire (23–24 March 1946)
- Battle of Bali Strait (5 April 1946)
- Battle of Margarana (20 November 1946)
- South Sulawesi campaign of 1946–1947
- Battle of Palembang (1947) (1–5 January 1947)
- 3 March affair (3 March 1947)
- Police Actions (Indonesia) (21 July 1947 – 5 January 1949)
  - Operation Product (21 July – 5 August 1947)
  - Operation Kraai (19 December 1948 – 5 January 1949)
- Air raids on Semarang–Salatiga–Ambarawa (29 July 1947)
- Battle of Karangresik (7 August 1947)
- Madiun Affair (18 September – 19 December 1948)
- Battle of Ciseupan (5 February 1949)
- General Offensive of 1 March 1949 (1 March 1949)
- Darul Islam rebellion (7 August 1949)
- Siege of Surakarta (7–10 August 1949)

== See also ==
- Independence Day (Indonesia)
- List of high-ranking commanders of the Indonesian National Revolution
- Timeline of the Indonesian National Revolution
- United Nations Commission for Indonesia
- Netherlands-Indonesia Union
- Revolusi

== Bibliography ==
- Agung, Ide Anak Agung Gde (1973). Twenty Years Indonesian Foreign Policy: 1945–1965. Mouton & Co. ISBN 979-8139-06-2.
- Ashton, Nigel John; Hellema, Duco (2001). Unspoken Allies: Anglo-Dutch Relations Since 1780. Amsterdam University Press. ISBN 978-90-485-0585-2.
- Bidien, Charles (5 December 1945). "Independence the Issue". Far Eastern Survey. 14 (24): 345–348. doi:10.2307/3023219. JSTOR 3023219.
- Bussemaker, H.Th. (2005). Bersiap! Opstand in het paradijs (in Dutch). Zutphen: Walburg Pers. ISBN 90-5730-366-3.
- Colombijn, Freek; Linblad, J. Thomas, eds. (2002). Roots of Violence in Indonesia: Contemporary Violence in Historical Perspective. Koninklijk Instituut Voor de Tropen. ISBN 90-6718-188-9.
- Cribb, Robert (1986). "A revolution delayed: the Indonesian Republic and the Netherlands Indies, August–November 1945". Australian Journal of Politics and History. 32 (1). The Australian National University: 72–85. doi:10.1111/j.1467-8497.1986.tb00342.x. Archived from the original on 21 December 2019.
- Fenton-Huie, Shirley h. (2005). The Forgotten Ones: Women and Children Under Nippon. Sydney: Angus and Robertson. ISBN 978-0207170775.
- Frederick, Willam H. (1989). Visions and Heat: The Making of the Indonesian Revolution. Athens, Ohio: Ohio University Press. ISBN 0-8214-0906-9.
- Frederick, William H.; Worden, Robert L., eds. (1993). "The National Revolution, 1945–50". Country Studies, Indonesia. GPO for the Library of Congress.
- Friend, Theodore (1988). Blue Eyed Enemy: Japan against the West in Java and Luzon, 1942–1945. Princeton University Press. ISBN 978-0-691-05524-4.
- Friend, Theodore (2003). Indonesian Destinies. The Belknap Press of Harvard University Press. ISBN 0-674-01834-6.
- Heren, Patrick (November 2010). "The Death Knell of the British Empire". Standpoint. Archived from the original on 4 November 2011.
- Jessup, John E. (1989). A Chronology of Conflict and Resolution, 1945–1985. New York: Greenwood Press. ISBN 0-313-24308-5.
- Kahin, George McTurnan (1952). Nationalism and Revolution in Indonesia. Ithaca, NY: Cornell University Press. ISBN 0-8014-9108-8.
- Kahin, George McTurnan (1980). "In Memoriam: Mohammad Hatta (1902–1980)" (PDF). Indonesia. 30 (30). Southeast Asia Program Publications at Cornell University: 113–120. doi:10.2307/3350997. hdl:1813/53609. JSTOR 3350997.
- Kahin, George McTurnan (2000). "Sukarno's Proclamation of Indonesian Independence" (PDF). Indonesia. 69 (69). Ithaca, NY: Cornell Modern Indonesia Project: 1–4. doi:10.2307/3351273. hdl:1813/54189. JSTOR 3351273.
- Kahin, George McTurnan; Audrey Kahin (2003). Southeast Asia: A Testament. London: Routledge Curzon. ISBN 0-415-29975-6.
- Kirby, Woodburn S (1969). War Against Japan, Volume 5: The Surrender of Japan. HMSO. p. 258.
- Kodam VI/Siliwang (1968). Siliwangi dari masa kemasa (in Indonesian). Fakta Mahjuma.
- McMillan, Richard (2005). The British Occupation of Indonesia 1945–1946. Melbourne: Routledge. ISBN 0-415-35551-6.
- Lockwood, Rupert (1975). Black Armada: Australia and the Struggle for Indonesian Independence 1942–49. Australasian Book Society.
- van Mook, H. J. (July 1949). "Indonesia". International Affairs. 25 (3). Royal Institute of International Affairs: 278. doi:10.2307/3016666. JSTOR 3016666.
- Parrott, J. G. A. (October 1975). "Who Killed Brigadier Mallaby?" (PDF). Indonesia. 20 (20). Cornell Modern Indonesia Project: 87–111. doi:10.2307/3350997. hdl:1813/53609. JSTOR 3350997.
- Pendit, Nyoman S. (1988) [1954]. Bali Berjuang (2nd ed.). Jakarta: Gunung Agung. ISBN 978-9799954114.
- Piccigallo, Philip R. (1979). The Japanese On Trial: Allied War Crimes Operations in the East, 1945–1951. University of Texas Press. ISBN 978-0-292-78033-0.
- Pramoedya Anwar Toer; Koesalah Soebagyo Toer; Ediati Kamil (2005). Kronik Revolusi Indonesia Vol I (1945) (in Indonesian). Kepustakaan Populer Gramedia. ISBN 978-9799023292.
- Pramoedya Anwar Toer; Koesalah Soebagyo Toer; Ediati Kamil (2005). Kronik Revolusi Indonesia Vol II (1946) (in Indonesian). Kepustakaan Populer Gramedia. ISBN 978-9799023308.
- Pramoedya Anwar Toer; Koesalah Soebagyo Toer; Ediati Kamil (2005). Kronik Revolusi Indonesia Vol III (1947) (in Indonesian). Kepustakaan Populer Gramedia. ISBN 978-9799023469.
- Pramoedya Anwar Toer; Koesalah Soebagyo Toer; Ediati Kamil (2014). Kronik Revolusi Indonesia Vol IV (1948) (in Indonesian). Kepustakaan Populer Gramedia. ISBN 978-9799106896.
- Reid, Anthony (1974). The Indonesian National Revolution 1945–1950. Melbourne: Longman. ISBN 0-582-71046-4.
- Reid, Anthony (1981). "Indonesia: revolution without socialism". In Jeffrey, Robin (ed.). Asia: the Winning of Independence. Macmillan. pp. 113–162. ISBN 978-0333278574.
- Ricklefs, M.C. (1991). A History of Modern Indonesia Since c. 1300. San Francisco: Stanford University Press. ISBN 1349227005.
- Said, H. Mohammed (1973). "What was the Social Revolution of 1946" in East Sumatra?" (PDF). Indonesia. 15 (April 1973). Ithaca, NY: Cornell Modern Indonesia Project: 145–186. doi:10.2307/3350795. hdl:1813/53556. JSTOR 3350795. Archived from the original (PDF) on 30 October 2018.
- "Stichting 1945–1950 Ubachsberg". 1945–1950ubachsberg.nl. Archived from the original on 10 November 2013.
- Stoler, Ann (1985). Capitalism and Confrontation in Sumatra's Plantation Belt, 1870–1979. New Haven: Yale University Press. ISBN 978-0472082193.
- Sukarno; Adams, Cindy (1965). Sukarno: An Autobiography. Bobbs-Merrill.
- Taylor, Jean Gelman (2003). Indonesia: Peoples and History. Yale University Press. p. 325. ISBN 0-300-10518-5.
- Tjandraningsih, Christine T. (19 August 2011). "Indonesians to get book on Japanese freedom fighter". Japan Times. Archived from the original on 18 January 2020.
- Van Reybrouck, David (2024). Revolusi: Indonesia and the Birth of the Modern World. New York, NY: W. W. Norton & Company. ISBN 9781324073697.
- Vandenbosch, Amry (1931). "Nationalism in Netherlands East India". Pacific Affairs. 4 (12). Pacific Affairs, University of British Columbia: 1051–1069. doi:10.2307/2750579. JSTOR 2750579.
- Vickers, Adrian (2005). A History of Modern Indonesia. New York: Cambridge University Press. pp. 85–112. ISBN 0-521-54262-6.
- Wild, Colin; Carey, Peter, eds. (1988). Born in Fire: The Indonesian Struggle for Independence. Ohio University Press. ISBN 0-8214-0881-X.
