= Battle of Palembang (1947) =

Indonesian National Revolution battle

- Part of Indonesian National Revolution
Date	1–5 January 1947 (4 days)
Location	Palembang, Indonesia
Result	Ceasefire

Belligerents
Indonesia	Netherlands

Commanders and leaders
(Indonesia) Col. Maludin Simbolon (Indonesia) Lt. Co. Bambang Utoyo (Indonesia) Maj. Rasyad Nawawi (Indonesia) Capt. Alamsyah	(Netherlands) Gen. Simon Spoor (Netherlands) Lt. Col. Mollinger

Strength
Unknown	Unknown

Casualties and losses
80 militants killed	4 militants killed

Battle of Palembang (Indonesian: Pertempuran Palembang) or Battle of the Five Days Five Night (Indonesian: Pertempuran Lima Hari Lima Malam) was an incident of resistance by the Indonesian army against attacks by Dutch army troops NICA which occurred in Palembang for five consecutive days from 1 to 5 January 1947.

The Dutch attempted to regain control of Indonesia in three ways, namely military action, establishing a Puppet state, and keeping Indonesia under their control.

== Background ==
After the Second World War subsided, the Allied army expanded into various former Japanese colonies in Indonesia, including Palembang, which was successfully achieved on October 12 1945 under the command of Lieutenant General Carmichael together with Dutch soldiers. These allied troops also protected the arrival of the Dutch army, whose number of troops increased day by day, especially when the allies left Palembang in March 1946, they handed over their position in Palembang City to the Dutch army. Palembang is one of Indonesia's strategic areas which the Dutch aimed to regain control of because of its natural riches and Palembang's potential as a center of government, military power and political and economic activities in South Sumatra. Meanwhile, for the people of Palembang, this battle became a momentum for their struggle to defend their land so that colonialism would not happen again after the proclamation of Indonesian independence. The initial conflict occurred when the Dutch wanted the city of Palembang to be vacated immediately, but this request was rejected by all the people of Palembang, ending in a shootout on January 1 1947 in Palembang Ilir and attacking the headquarters of the Barisan Rebel Republik Indonesia (BPRI) on Jalan Tengkuruk. Several important figures who led the battle from the Indonesian army and fighters included Colonel Maludin Simbolon, Lieutenant Colonel Bambang Utoyo, Major Rasyad Nawawi, Captain Alamsyah.

== Battle line ==
The strongest Dutch defense centers were at Kuto Besak Fort, Charitas Hospital and Bagus Kuning (Plaju), while the strength of Palembang fighters was spread evenly in every Dutch defense place. On the first day after the shooting incident on Jalan Tengkuruk, Palembang fighters attacked and surrounded the Dutch troops who were defending in all sectors they had previously controlled. The battle ended at five in the afternoon, but towards evening the Dutch troops attacked again using armored weapons which resulted in several strategic places being controlled by the Dutch, such as the telegraph office, resident's office, mayor's office and post office.

Following on the second and third days, the Dutch again attacked the army defense center and fighters in the Palembang Grand Mosque area, but were repelled by the Geni Battalion troops along with a number of community leaders. Meanwhile, from the direction of Talang Betutu, Dutch reinforcements who were about to join the Grand Mosque were ambushed by Palembang fighters led by First Lieutenant Wahid Luddien. The fighting continued, leaving much of Palembang City destroyed. On the fourth day reinforcements for Palembang fighters arrived from Lampung under the command of Major Noerdin Pandji and from Lahat led by Lt. Gen. Harun Sohar.

== End of battle ==
Towards the fifth day of fighting, after shortages of logistical supplies and ammunition, both sides held a meeting between their civilian and military leaders who decided to call a ceasefire. Indonesia sent Dr. Adnan Kapau Gani as a representative from the central government to hold negotiations with the Dutch. The results of the negotiations agreed that on the Indonesian side, TRI troops and other fighters would withdraw 20 km from the city center, leaving only the ALRI, police and civil government to remain in Palembang City. Meanwhile, on the Dutch side, their outposts could only be set up 14 km from the city center. The ceasefire came into effect on January 6, 1947.
