= Battle of Karangresik =

1947 Battle in Tasikmalaya, West Java

Battle of Karangresik (1947)
- Part of Indonesian National Revolution
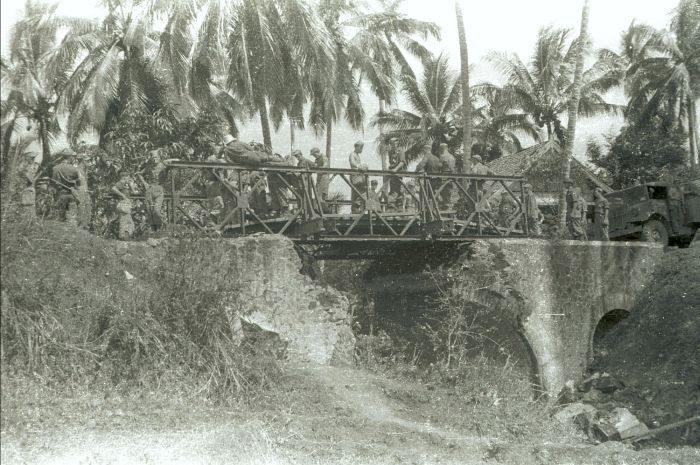
- Karang Resik Bridge
Date	7 August 1947
Location	Karang Resik, Tasikmalaya, West Java
Result	Indonesian victory; The bridge was destroyed, and the blockade of Dutch forces

Belligerents
Indonesia	Netherlands

Commanders and leaders
Unknown	Unknown

Strength
One division	One battalion with armored vehicles and heavy weapons

Casualties and losses
Heavy Casualties	Hundreds were killed, Many weapons and trucks were captured

The Battle of Karang Resik was a battle in Karang Resik, Tasikmalaya, West Java that took place in 1947. It cost many lives, ending in an Indonesian victory, despite Indonesia's far weaker military.

== Background ==
On 10 August 1947, Dutch forces launched an attack on West Java. The Dutch used the strategic and vital bridge in Tasikmalaya to gain access to the town of Ciamis. At the time, the Dutch were struggling to regain control over Indonesia after the Proclamation of Indonesian Independence in August, 1947. The bridge provided a perfect opportunity, as it was located in a strategically beneficial location connecting Ciamis to Tasikmalaya, which allowed the movement of troops and supplies.

== Battle ==
At 9 A.M, Dutch forces arrived from Ciamis. Once in Tasikmalaya supported by heavy weapons and armored vehicles, the Dutch moved to strike at the Karang Resik Bridge.

By the time the Dutch forces arrived, however, the bridge was destroyed by the Indonesian military. The Indonesian fighters then proceeded to ambush the Dutch, when they came out from the truck the Indonesian forces bombarding and ambushed them with mortar fire and rifles.

The Dutch convoy could not move past the attackers and suffered many casualties. Thereafter Dutch forces retreated with many of them killed or traumatized by the ambush.

Despite the Indonesians' far less advanced weapons, with no tanks or armored vehicles, they forced the Dutch to retreat into Sindangkasih.

=== Bombing of Tasikmalaya ===
The next day the Dutch bombarded Tasikmalaya using P-51 Mustang aircraft, to force the Indonesian forces to retreat into another regency. The airstrike caused extensive destruction including the Siliwangi Headquarter and civilian casualties, with the Siliwangi Headquarter in Tasikmalaya also getting destroyed.

== See also ==
- List of wars involving Indonesia
- Proclamation of Indonesian Independence
- Indonesian National Revolution
