= Battle of Kumai =

Dutch military conflict against Indonesia

- Part of the Indonesian National Revolution
Date	14 January 1946
Location	Kumai, Central Kalimantan
Result	Indonesian victory

Belligerents
Netherlands	Indonesia

Strength
250	Unknown

Casualties and losses
51 killed	21 killed

The Battle of Kumai (Indonesian: Pertempuran Kumai) or also known locally as the Battle of 14 January (Indonesian: Pertempuran 14 Januari) was a clash between Netherlands Indies Civil Administration and Royal Netherlands East Indies Army against Indonesian militias in town of Kumai, Central Kalimantan. Indonesian militias, consisted of mostly pemuda (youths), newly formed Indonesian Army, and armed Islamic cleric militia; known as Barisan Ulama (Ulema Front) or Barisan Berjenggot (Bearded Front), confronted Dutch armed convoys that tried to land in the port.

The convoy with strength of around 250, was shot from harbour by militias before made a landing, preventing them to do so. As the result, 50 Dutch soldiers died while 21 recorded also died from Republican side, and the convoy was diverted away from the town.

The battle was reported by delegation of Indonesian nationalist from Borneo in militia commander meeting in Yogyakarta, 21 February 1946. From those delegations are from Laskar Kalimantan (lit: Kalimantan Troops) and also from Barisan Ulema.

== Legacy ==
The battle is commemorated every year by local government and locals from the town. A road in the town is named Jalan Gerilya, means "Guerilla Street", commemorating the battle. A monument, named Monumen Merah Putih (Red and White Monument) was built in the town with mural depicting soldiers on walls surrounding it.
