= Railway Youth Force =

- Angkatan Muda Kereta Api
- Leader: Sachjani
- Dates active: September-December 1945
- Country: Indonesia
- Wars: Indonesian National Revolution

The Railway Youth Force (Indonesian: Angkatan Muda Kereta Api (AMKA)) was an Islamic youth group that engaged in guerrilla warfare in late 1945 to seize Central Java's railroads during the Indonesian National Revolution.

== History ==
=== Foundation ===
The group was founded in September 1945 to secure the Republic of Indonesia Railway Department (DKRI) from being taken over by the Allied Powers. The group was based in Pekalongan. In early September 1945, the group kidnapped many local leaders to compel active support of the Indonesian National Revolution.

=== Occupation of Tegal ===
The group was headquartered in Talang (Central Java) where its leader, Sachjani (popularly known as Kutil), had firmly entrenched himself as the most powerful person in the area. To expand his influence, Sachjani attacked Tegal in early November with thousands of followers shouting Allahu akbar (Allah is Great), and La ilaha illallah (There is no God but Allah) in their northward march. They occupied the major part of the town, including the strategic railway station, and they forced the local Indonesian Army onto the defensive. Uprisings occurred in the regencies of Brebes, Tegal and Pemalang. By early December, the AMKA' also entered Pekalongan.

=== End of organization ===
By mid December, Indonesian troops struck back and re-occupied Pekalongan, arresting some AMKA's members. Kutil was sentenced to death in October 1946, and executed in 1951. During its existence, AMKA broke Japanese control over Indonesia's railways while helping to repatriate Japanese people in Indonesia.
