= Battle of Kotabaru =

1945 Indonesian National Revolution battle

- Part of the Indonesian National Revolution
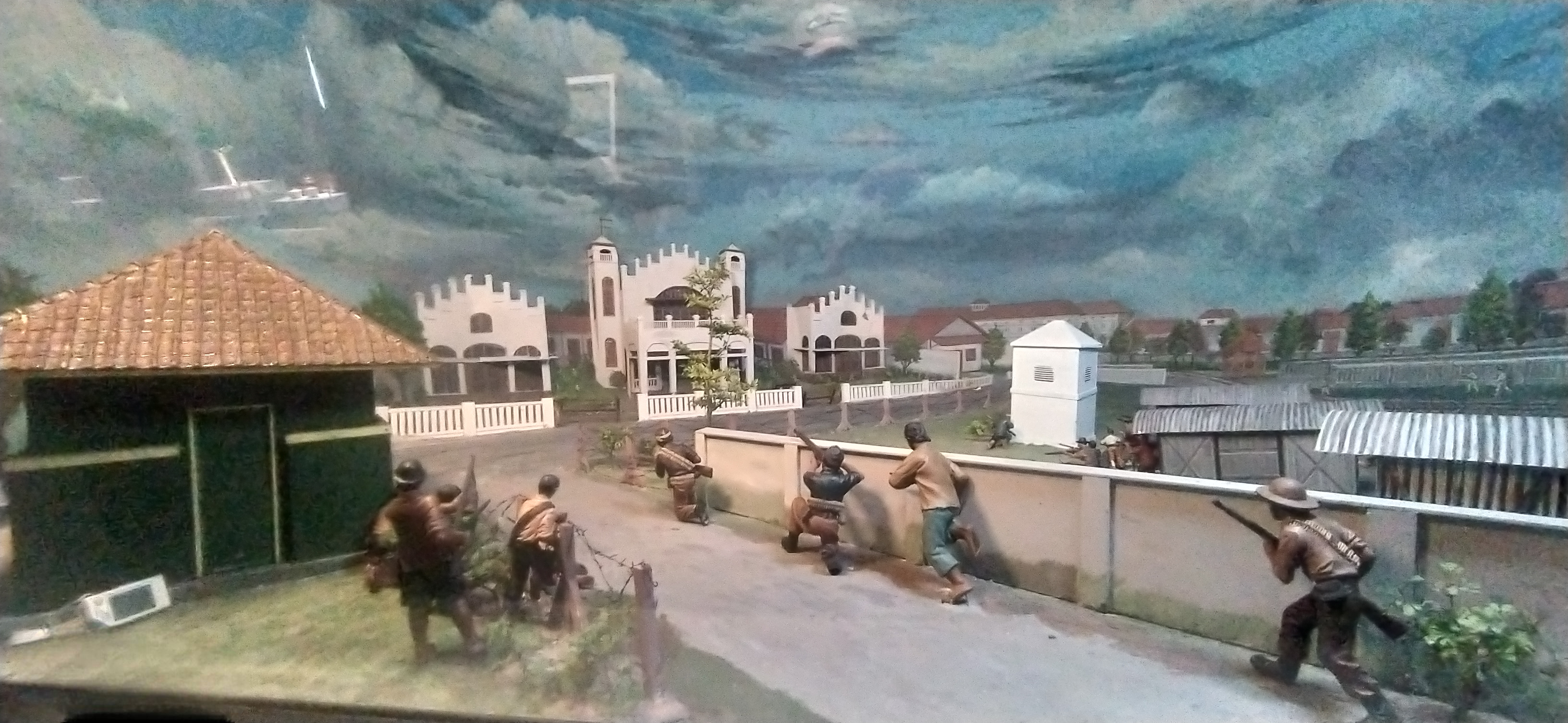
- Diorama depicting the Battle of Kotabaru
Date	7 October 1945
Location	Kotabaru, Yogyakarta
Result	Indonesian victory

Belligerents
Indonesia	Japan

Commanders and leaders
(Indonesia) Hamengkubuwono IX (Indonesia) Suharto	(Japan) Maj. Otzuka (surrendered)

Strength
~1,000	~370

Casualties and losses
21 dead 32 wounded	9 dead 20 wounded 360 surrendered

The Battle of Kotabaru (Indonesian: Pertempuran Kotabaru) was a clash between Indonesian nationalists and a Japanese garrison in Yogyakarta on 7 October 1945. The Indonesians launched an attack on the Japanese garrison with the intent of acquiring weapons for use in the war of independence.

== Background ==
Shortly after the proclamation of Indonesian independence on 17 August 1945, nationalist youths (pemuda) began seizing power and administrative authority from the Japanese garrison stationed there. In Central Java, they had largely seized civil powers by late September, and negotiations began with Japanese troops for the garrisoned units to surrender their arms to the Indonesians. In some cases, negotiations went favorably for Indonesians, and Japanese commanders surrendered their weapons and relocated outside the major cities, such as in Surakarta.

In Yogyakarta, former members of PETA (a Japanese-established volunteer unit) banded together to form part of the Yogyakarta branch of the People's Security Agency (BKR, later People's Security Army/TKR). Among the Indonesian soldiers' leaders in the branch was Suharto, who would later become President of Indonesia. After its establishment, the unit began seeking arms from Japanese units. On 5 October, Sultan of Yogyakarta Hamengkubuwono IX declared his affiliation to the declared Republic of Indonesia, and the Japanese resident of the city was apprehended by the pemuda.

== Battle ==
On 6 October, local pemuda negotiated with the city's Kempeitai commander based in the Kotabaru area of Yogyakarta, one major Otzuka, for the surrender of weapons, but the commander refused. The negotiations went on through the night, and Otzuka offered to hand over the weapons if provided with orders from his superior officer, but the Indonesians refused this, and clashes began around 4 AM on 7 October. The clashes lasted for around six hours, during which 21 Indonesians were killed and 32 were wounded, while 9 Japanese soldiers were killed and 20 were wounded.

In the heat of the fighting, the Indonesian negotiators returned inside the garrison and again offered an opportunity to surrender - which was accepted by Otzuka, provided the weapons were handed over to the Sultan. Fighting ended at around 10:30, and around 360 Japanese were taken prisoner.

== Aftermath ==
Following the surrender, the Japanese commander visited Hamengkubuwono IX, formally surrendering the garrison's weapons which was handed over to the newly formed People's Security Army. A monument was later erected to commemorate the battle and the 21 Indonesians killed in the fighting, whose names were used as street names in the Kotabaru area.
