= Battle of Petaling =

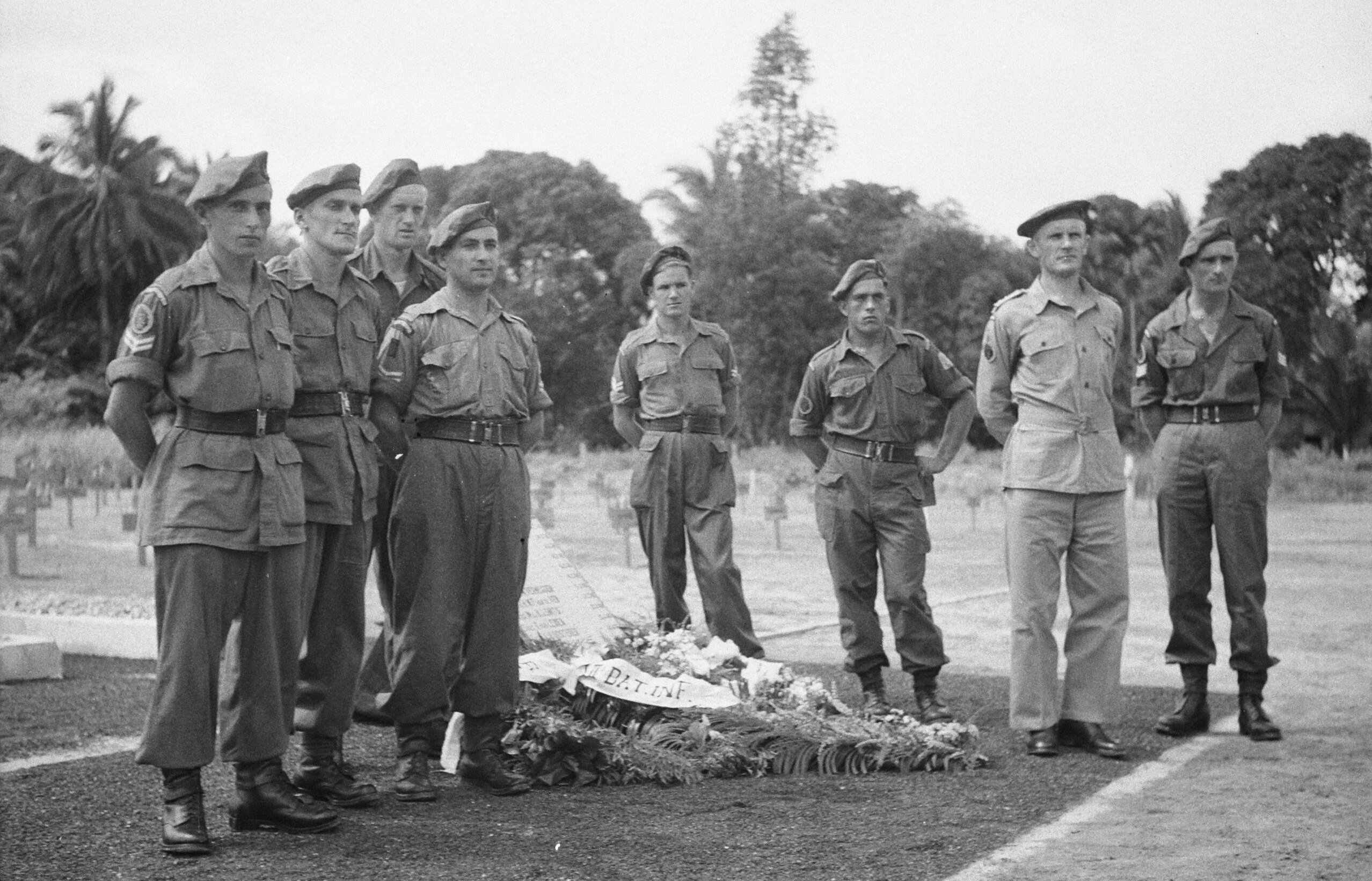
- Dutch troops in Bangka commemorating their losses in the battle
Date	14 February 1946
Location	Petaling, Bangka 2°7′S 106°1′E
Result	Dutch victory

Belligerents
Netherlands	Indonesia

Units involved
NICA	People's Security Army

Casualties and losses
6 killed	12 or 30 killed

The Battle of Petaling took part on 14 February 1946 between forces of the Netherlands Indies Civil Administration (NICA) and local units of the Indonesian People's Security Army (TKR) near the villages of Petaling and Cengkong Abang on the island of Bangka. In the battle, TKR units unsuccessfully attempted to stop NICA forces from entering Pangkalpinang, although they managed to inflict some casualties before they were forced to withdraw, allowing NICA forces to secure the city.

== Background ==
After the proclamation of Indonesian independence on 17 August 1945, nationalists in Bangka Island organized local government and units of the People's Security Army (Tentara Keamanan Rakyat/TKR) throughout October 1945. The local TKR unit was arranged as a regiment, divided into three battalions: one based in Muntok, one in Pangkalpinang, and one slated for neighboring Belitung. The returning Dutch under the Netherlands Indies Civil Administration (NICA), on the other hand, landed soldiers in Belitung in November 1945, and on 11 February 1946 they landed around 3,000 soldiers aboard the British troop transport HMS Rocksand in Muntok, ostensibly to disarm Japanese soldiers, but also to secure tin mining facilities in Bangka. The landed Dutch forces, contained, among others, elements of the Stoottroepen Regiment.

== Events ==
The TKR unit from Muntok retreated towards Pangkalpinang, meeting up with the other battalions, and they opted to establish two defensive positions: one 16 km away from Pangkalpinang, and a second position 12–13 km away, located near the village of Petaling in the Muntok-Pangkalpinang road respectively. NICA forces also left for Pangkalpinang on 13 February. At the 16 km roadblock the following day, the NICA force engaged in a firefight with TKR forces, but suffered no casualties and TKR units withdrew to the second position. The second position, located at a hill known as the Maandil hill between Petaling and the neighboring village of Cengkong Abang, was considerably better-fortified.

Fighting began at the second position around noon, and the fighting was much fiercer, with six Dutch soldiers killed including a chaplain and a soldier-medic in addition to several wounded. On the Indonesian side, at least twelve soldiers were killed – six from the Muntok battalion and six from the Pangkalpinang battalion – and were buried by their comrades in a mass grave, though a Dutch account remarked that thirty were killed including a Japanese man. The TKR units eventually withdrew, allowing the NICA forces to reach Pangkalpinang by 2 PM that day, finding the city heavily damaged by retreating Indonesian forces and by local looters.

== Aftermath ==
NICA forces continued to secure the island, capturing the southern town of Toboali by 19 February and largely securing the island by the end of the month. Remaining local TKR units, outnumbered and outgunned, left the island for Palembang in order to join the TKR units there and they were reorganized as a company.

A monument was erected at the site of the battle commemorating the 12 Indonesian dead – whose bodies were relocated to a cemetery in Sungailiat in 1971. A number of local roads and bridges, along with an academy in Sungailiat, are named after them, referred to as the "12 Heroes" (Pahlawan 12). At least two Bronze Crosses were awarded posthumously to Dutch soldiers killed in the action.
