= Battle of Ambarawa =

Battle of the Indonesian Revolution (1945-1949)

Semarang offensive
- Part of the Indonesian National Revolution
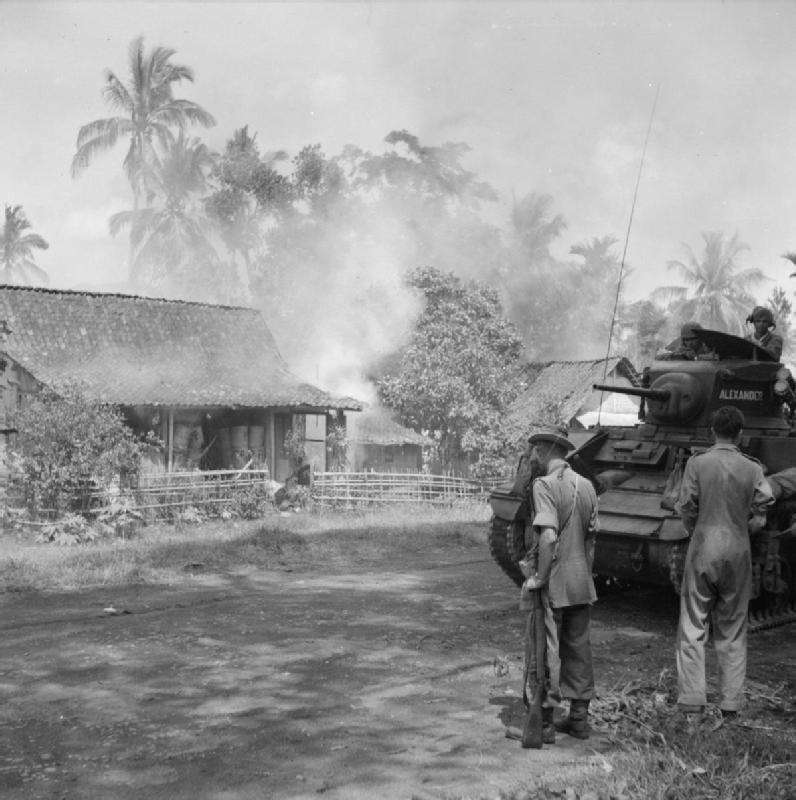
- British forces in Ambarawa set a village ablaze in retaliation for harboring Indonesian nationalists, 1945.
Date	20 October - 16 December 1945 (1 month, 3 weeks and 5 days)
Location	Semarang and Magelang, Indonesia
Result	Indonesian victory; Withdrawal of all British troops from Magelang, and Ambarawa.
Territorial changes	Ambarawa and Magelang was recaptured by Indonesian forces; Semarang stayed under British control.

Belligerents
Indonesia	United Kingdom; Netherlands; Japan

Commanders and leaders
Col. Soedirman (Leader of People's Security Army, Division V/Banyumas); Lt. Col. Isdiman †; Lt. Col. Gatot Subroto (Division V/Purwokerto); Lt. Col. M. Sarbini (Central Kedu Regiment); Maj. Sarjono (Battalion VIII Division III/Surabaya); Maj. Soeharto (Battalion X Division IX/Yogyakarta)	Brigadier R. G. Bethell

Units involved
Indonesian Army; 5th Division (Banyumas); Civilian Militias (Laskar-laskar Rakyat)	British Army; 23rd Infantry Division (India); 23rd Artillery Brigade; (Netherlands) NICA (Japan) Japanese POWs

Strength
10,000+ (Ambarawa)	Unknown

Casualties and losses
2,000 killed	100 killed (Ambarawa)

The Semarang offensive is composite of the Battle of Ambarawa (20 October–15 December 1945; 55 days), Magelang offensive (26 October–15 December 1945; 49 days), Battle of Ungaran or Ungaran offensive, and Semarang offensive proper (Indonesian: Palagan Ambarawa). This major battle took place between the recently created Indonesian Army and the British Army with the Dutch forces that occurred between 20 October 1945 and 2 March 1946 in Semarang city, Semarang Regency, and Magelang Regency in Central Java, Indonesia. Perhaps the most successful Indonesian offensive of the Indonesian Revolution, this offensive tightened British and Dutch control from the Magelang and Semarang metropolitan areas to only Semarang city. In modern times, 15 December is celebrated as the Indonesian National Infantry Day.

== Prelude ==
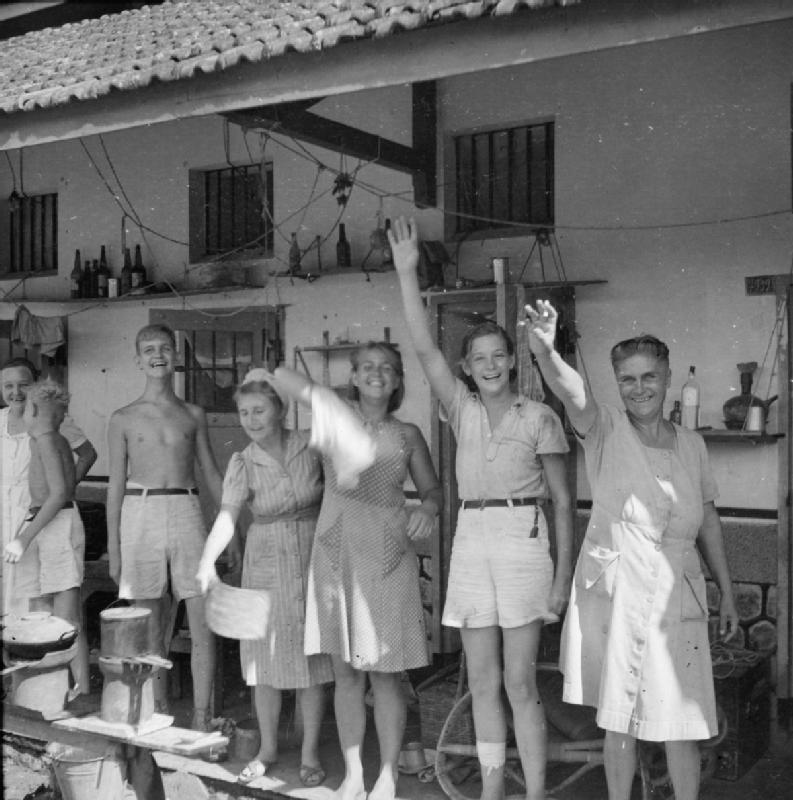
Dutch civilians welcome the arrival of the 49th Indian Brigade at Bangjoebiroe Camp interned by Indonesian nationalists.

On 19 October 1945, Allied troops under the command of Lieutenant-Colonel Edwardes landed in Semarang to disarm Japanese troops and liberate POWs still detained in camps in Central Java. Initially, the troops were welcomed by the Indonesians because their presence halted the attacks on them by Japanese troops in revenge for the massacre of around 200 imprisoned Japanese civilians by Indonesian "extremists" in nearby Semarang. The troops were under orders to remain neutral in "political matters". At a meeting with Central Java governor Wongsonegoro, agreement was reached that the Indonesian police would be allowed to keep their weapons, but that civilians would be disarmed. In return agreed to provide foodstuffs and other necessities for the smooth running of the Allied task, while the Allies promised not to interfere with the sovereignty of the current government.

=== Battle of Magelang ===
In late October 1945, the British-Indian forces marched towards Ambarawa and then Magelang. However, when Dutch POWs were freed by the British-Indian forces in Ambarawa and Magelang, many locals were angered. After the first Battle of Surabaya commenced, local Indonesian forces felt compelled to attack the British-Indian forces in Magelang, including a regiment under the command of Lieutenant Colonel M. Sarbini which began besieging Allied troops stationed in Magelang. In this assault, the Indonesian forces managed to split the local British-Indian garrison, and to counter this, the British called in air support. A joint British-Japanese company-sized force from Semarang was also despatched by the British to Magelang. The battle ended in a ceasefire after Indonesian president Sukarno intervened in the situation to calm tensions.

== Battle ==
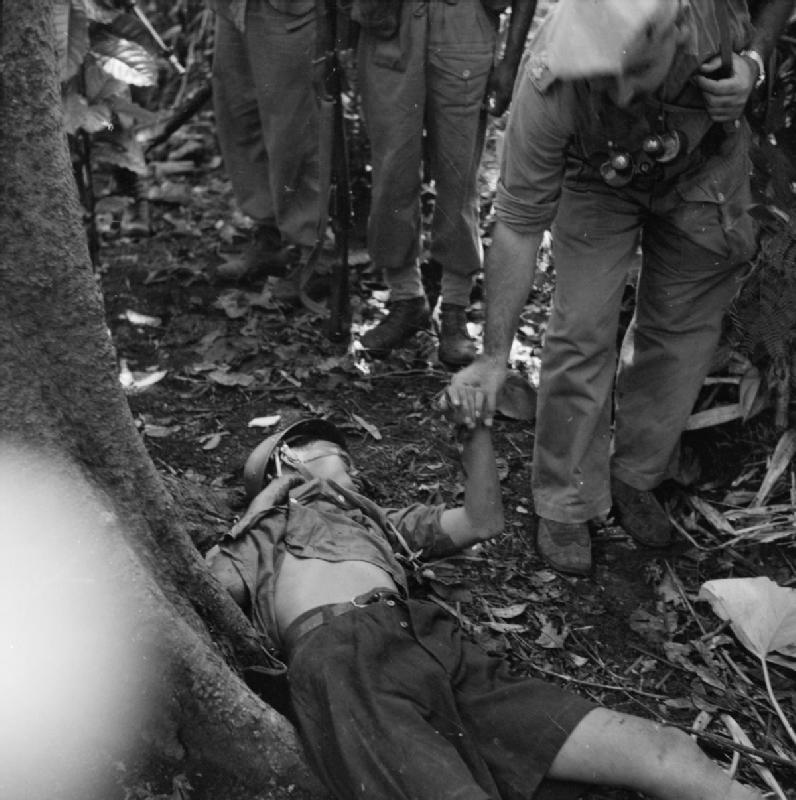
A young Indonesian nationalist ("Pemuda") killed whilst operating a captured British 2-pounder anti-tank gun, inspected by a British Indian soldier

After the middle of October, Allied forces withdrew from Magelang to Ambarawa. Sarbini's regiment followed the Allies in pursuit, and was later joined by other Indonesian troops from Ambarawa, Suruh, and Surakarta. The retreat of the Allied troops was halted at Jambu Village because it was blocked by the Oni Sastrodihardjo's youth forces. Allied troops were later driven out of the nearby village of Jambu by the Indonesian forces.

At the village of Ngipik, Allied troops were again intercepted by Soerjosoempeno's 1st Battalion at Ngipikand were forced to retreat again by the Indonesian Army, after attempting to establish control over two villages around Ambarawa. Indonesian troops under the command of Lieutenant Colonel Isdiman tried to free the two villages, but Isdiman was killed in action before reinforcements arrived. Since the death of Lt. Col. Isdiman, the Commander of the 5th Banyumas Division, Col. Soedirman felt the loss of one of his best officers and he immediately took to the field to lead the battle. Colonel Soedirman, vowed to avenge Isdiman's death and called in reinforcements to besiege Allied positions in Central Java. Unknown to his servicemen, he had been elected Commander of the Armed Forces on 12 November in absentia, as he was still with his division.

At the village of Ngipik, Allied troops were again intercepted by Soerjosoempeno's 1st Battalion at Ngipik and were forced to retreat again by the Indonesians, after attempting to establish control over two villages around Ambarawa. Indonesian troops under the command of Lieutenant Colonel Isdiman tried to free the two villages, but Isdiman was killed in action before reinforcements arrived. Since the death of Lt. Col. Isdiman, the Commander of the 5th Banyumas Division, Col. Soedirman felt the loss of one of his best officers and he immediately took to the field to lead the battle. Colonel Soedirman, vowed to avenge Isdiman's death and called in reinforcements to besiege Allied positions in Central Java. Unknown to his servicemen, he had been elected Commander of the Armed Forces on 12 November in absentia, as he was still with his division.

On the morning of 23 November 1945, Indonesian troops began firing on Allied troops stationed in Ambarawa. A counterattack by the Allies forced the Indonesian Army to retreat to the village of Bedono.

On 11 December 1945, Soedirman held a meeting with various commanders of the Indonesian Army. The next day at 4:30 AM, the Indonesian Army launched an assault on the Allies in Ambarawa. Indonesian artillery pounded Allied positions, which were later overrun by infantry. When the Semarang-Ambarawa highway was captured by Indonesian troops, Soedirman immediately ordered his forces to cut off the supply routes of the remaining Allied troops by using a pincer maneuver. Col Soedirman's presence breathed new life into the Indonesian troops. Coordination was held between sector commands and the siege against the enemy tightened. The tactic applied was an impromptu attack simultaneously in all sectors. Reinforcements continued to pour in from Yogyakarta, Surakarta, Salatiga, Purwokerto, Magelang, Semarang, etc. The battle ended four days later on 15 December 1945, when Indonesia succeeded in regaining control over Ambarawa and the Allies retreated to Semarang.

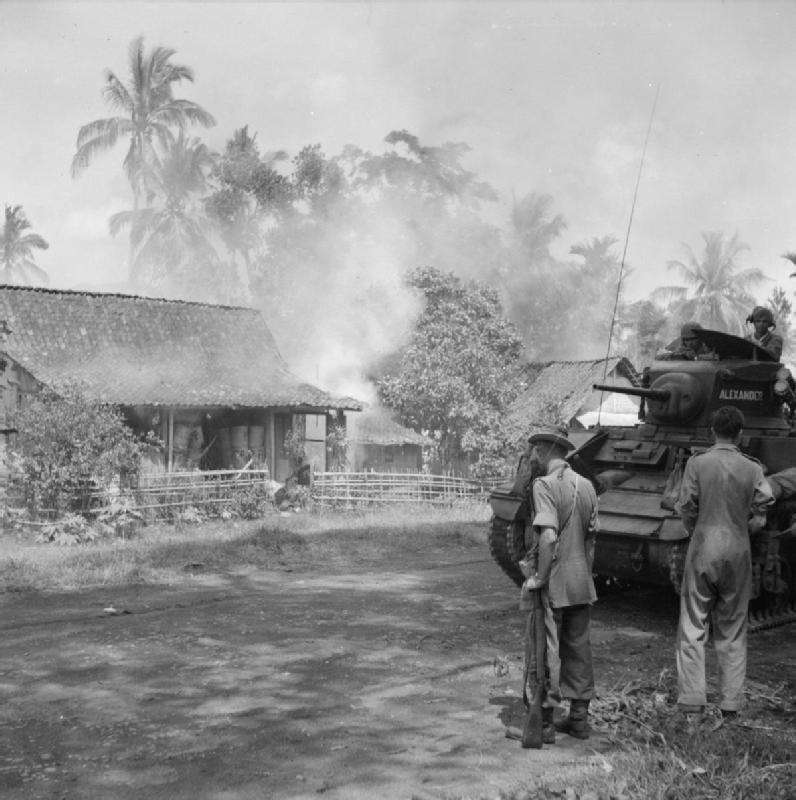
British forces in Ambarawa set a village ablaze in retaliation for harboring Indonesian nationalists, 1945.

=== Battle of Ungaran ===
On 1945 the Indonesian forces led by Major Soeyoto launched an ambush on an allied convoy in Ungaran, Semarang Regency. The convoy was backed by a P-51 Mustang and then the companies led by Second Lieutenant Suwarno attacked the Allied convoy, where Major Soeyoto also joined. The Indonesian forces succeeded in inflicting heavy casualties onto the Allies and many of the Allied supplies were destroyed, unfortunately, Suwarno and Soeyoto were killed after a duel with the British Gurkha's and Japanese POW's.

=== Siege on Fort Williem ===
After the British retreated and had suffered counter-attacks by the Indonesian forces, the British companies in Ambarawa also experienced an encirclement and blockade in Fort Williem, Ambarawa, at this blockade, the British were trapped for four days and four nights, and they suffered from a lack of food and supplies.

== Aftermath ==
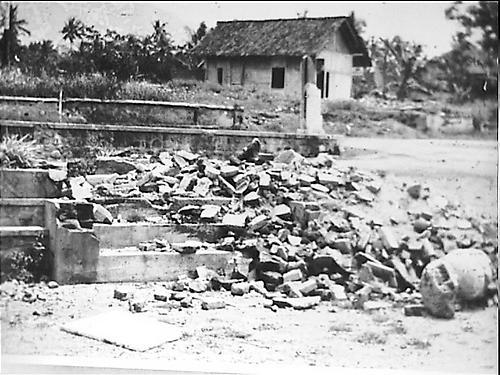
At a cost of 16,000 rupiahs, the TNI initially erected a memorial in Ambarawa to commemorate the British retreat. Destroyed after a Dutch scout car accidentally crashed into it.

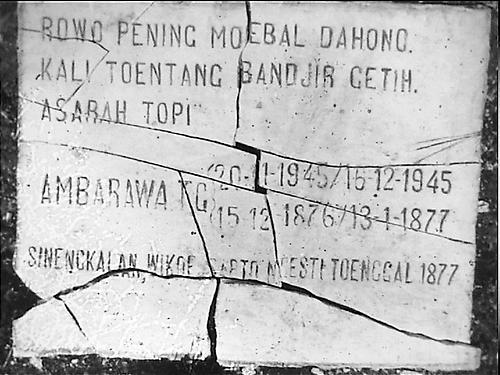
Original Monument's Plaque:
"Rawa Pening's gift. The Toentang river is flooded with blood, taking the bamboo hats with it. Nature's will and it will come to pass."

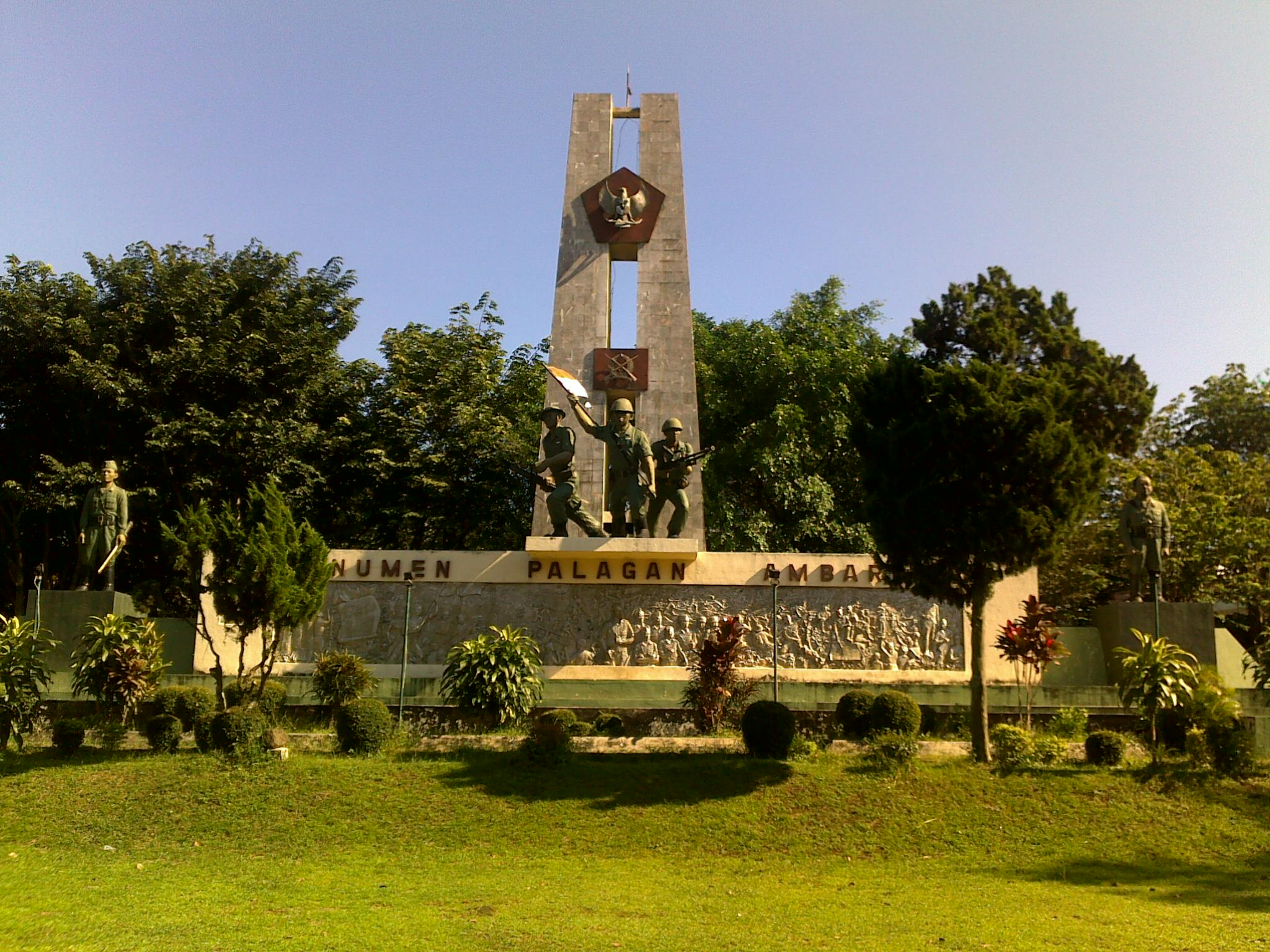
Palagan Ambarawa Monument

Just three days after the victory, Soedirman was promoted to major general and his election as Commander of the Armed Forces, retroactive to 12 November, was confirmed, succeeding Oerip Soemohardjo, the ad interim chief for the forces, who was appointed chief of staff.

The Palagan Ambarawa Monument in Ambarawa was erected in memory of the battle. The battle's anniversary is also celebrated nationwide as Indonesian Army Day (Hari Juang Kartika TNI Angkatan Darat), a day of celebration of the first ever victory of the young army in the Indonesian National Revolution.

== Bibliography ==
- Anderson, Benedict R. O'G (1972). Java in a time of revolution: occupation and resistance,1944-1946. Ithaca, N.Y.: Cornell University Press.
- McMillan, Richard (2006). The British Occupation of Indonesia 1945-1946: Britain, The Netherlands and the Indonesian Revolution. New York: Routledge. ISBN 0-415-35551-6.
- G., Dwipayana (1989). Soeharto : Pikiran, Ucapan dan Tindakan Saya. Jakarta: Citra Kharisma Bunda. ISBN 979-8085-01-9.
