= 1945 PETA revolt in Blitar =

Uprising against Japanese occupation by local armies in Indonesia

The Great Revolt Indonesia
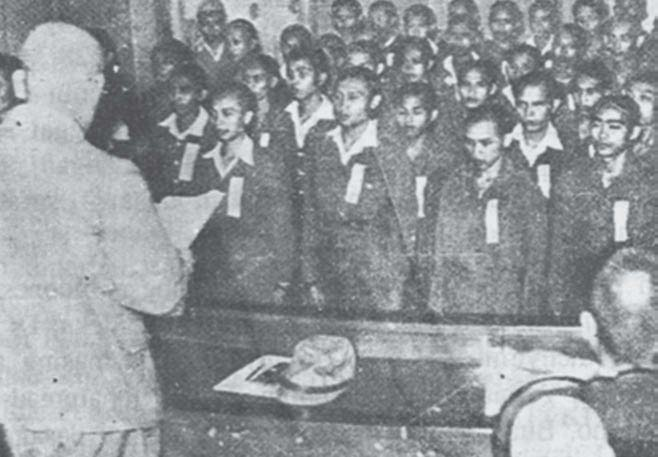
- Reading of the verdict by the Japanese military court against PETA members who took part in the Blitar Daidan rebellion.
Date	14 February 1945
Location	Blitar, Japanese-occupied Dutch East Indies
Result	Japanese victory; uprising suppressed

Belligerents
PETA	Japan

Commanders and leaders
Supriyadi (MIA)	(Empire of Japan) Miyamoto Shizuo

Casualties and losses
78 captured	

The PETA revolt in Blitar (Indonesian: Pemberontakan PETA di Blitar) was an anti-occupation revolt in present-day Indonesia, which took place on 14 February 1945 by the PETA daidan (battalion) in Blitar. This revolt was widely known as the first major uprising of local armies in Indonesia during the Japanese occupation. The revolt ended unsuccessfully; most of the rebels abandoned the attack, or were captured or killed by the Japanese. Nevertheless, the government of Indonesia acknowledged the revolt as a meaningful revolution.

The rebels were led by Supriyadi, who disappeared after the revolt. In 1975, President Suharto issued Presidential Decree no.63 of 1975 officially acknowledging Supriyadi as a national hero of Indonesia.

== Background ==
=== Arrival of the Japanese in Indonesia ===
Upon occupation by Nazi Germany, the Dutch had to hand over the Dutch East Indies, its colony, to Imperial Japan, only months after the first German attack. The arrival of the Japanese occupiers in March 1942 was celebrated by Indonesians who had suffered under the colonial Dutch. To many Indonesians Japan was a savior which would chase the Western colonials away, and bring independence for the Indonesian people.

Unlike its Dutch predecessors, or other Western colonials in South East Asia, the Japanese tried to encourage, if not boost, national sentiments of the local people from the very beginning of its arrival, so that they would support the Japanese occupation of Indonesia. The Japanese military forces did not suppress nor restrain the Indonesian people's desire for sovereignty. Instead, the national anthem Indonesia Raya was allowed to be played in the middle of city streets, and ‘Sang Merah Putih’, the national flag of Indonesia could be displayed everywhere.

Japanese propaganda painted imperial Japan as a friend which came to liberate Indonesia, rather than an enemy intent on exploiting the resources of the Archipelago. Numerous prominent figures of Indonesian politics who had taken a firm stand against the Dutch, such as Sukarno and Hatta, agreed to collaborate with the Japanese military in order to promote the independence of the nation and defend it from a return by Dutch colonizers.

=== Formation of PETA ===
The kindness of Japan to Indonesia was not free of cost. Japan tried to conscript the young generation of Indonesia to supplement its own military forces. Adding more personnel was very critical for the Japanese military. However, Gatot Mangkupradja, a pro-Japanese nationalist figure, opposed Japan's idea of conscription. Instead, he proposed a volunteer-based military battalion to be known as the Volunteer Army of Homeland Defenders, or Tentara Sukarela Pembela Tanah Air in Indonesian, called PETA. Gatot argued that Indonesian men should have the right to freely choose whether to fight, and also take the consequences of their choice. It is said that Gatot wrote the petition with his blood; thus the heart of the Japanese commandant who received it was greatly touched.

The response from Indonesian youth was impressive. Thousands applied to join PETA, and the Japanese military forces felt satisfied as well. The spirit of voluntarism made many Indonesian believe that PETA was an indigenous army that was created to liberate the nation of Indonesia. In addition, most of the officers who voluntarily joined PETA were from the high strata of Indonesian society. This helped to obscure the fact that PETA was formed to serve the military purposes of colonial Japan, not to fight for independence. PETA's role was to protect the homeland from external threats such as the Dutch and the Allied Forces, but Japan was not seen as one of those threats. Later, many former PETA officers became the leaders of Indonesian military forces after independence, for instance, Sudirman and Soeharto.

=== Continuous suffering ===
Indonesia's huge population was not the only resource that imperial Japan coveted. Indonesia was a country with the largest territory and richest natural resources, valuable for imperial Japan, which was in the middle of the fierce struggles of World War II. Japan's policy in Indonesia, therefore, was very economically oriented as well.

Japan used Java as its operational base for all of South East Asia, thus Java was one of the most oppressed places in Indonesia during the occupation. Javanese farmers were forced to plant rice and sell it only to the Japanese government at a very low price. In consequence, the farmers had little to eat no matter how great the harvest. They also could not buy some foods in the market, because of shortage of supply, since all farmers had to sell their rice to the Japanese only, and lack of money, for the farmers received little in exchange for their crops. By the end of 1944, more than 2.4 million Javanese had died of starvation. Nobody was safe from Japanese cruelty. Almost every able-bodied man and woman was forced to become rōmusha (the Japanese word for Indonesian forced labourers). Many died from overwork and illness without proper food or medication. Many Indonesian women were also deceived and sent away from their homes, eventually ending up as comfort women for Japanese forces all over South East Asia.

Injustice also took place within the PETA itself. Japan behaved unfairly and discriminated against Indonesian civilians and PETA soldiers. PETA officers had to be respectful to every Japanese soldier, no matter what rank they held. Cultural differences also played a major role in disputes between Indonesians and the Japanese within the PETA. While a slap to men under his command is a common way for a Japanese officer to tighten and maintain discipline, in Indonesia merely touching the head of another, no matter what your rank, is regarded as rude, abusive, and offensive. So when Japanese officers used their hands in their accustomed way, most Indonesian military personnel felt insulted.

Seeing the miserable condition of their people, the PETA battalion personnel started to lose hope for an independent Indonesia with a bright future. They came to feel that neither the Dutch nor the Japanese had any right to keep Indonesian people suffering. In summary, the three main reasons of Supriyadi, the instigator of the rebellion, to revolt were “the plight of civilians and rōmusha, Japanese arrogance, and the need for real independence.”

== Chronology of the revolt ==
It is a bit unclear who precisely proposed the revolt first. However, Supriyadi, who was less than 22 years old at the time, started to gather some trusted members, and held secret meetings to plan the action starting in September 1944, which continued until the sixth meeting on 13 February 1945. In their last meeting, the rebels decided to attack the city divided into four groups. The following day, the rebels attacked two buildings that were usually occupied by the Japanese military forces, intending to kill every Japanese they encountered. However, the attack had been anticipated by Japanese military command, and the buildings had been abandoned before the attack began.

After their attack failed, the rebels quickly left the city to regroup and plan a new attack. However, there were two main problems faced by the rebels in carrying out their plans. First, Japan used other Indonesian personnel under Japanese command to oppose the rebels. This tactic was quite successful, as the rebels were reluctant to attack other Indonesian PETA soldiers who were forced by the Japanese to confront their revolt. Second, the Japanese military forces succeeded in isolating the Blitar battalion completely. The separation of the military command structure of PETA worked effectively; thus not many units of Indonesian soldiers even in the same region would even hear about the revolt in Blitar. The rebel forces were scattered, and many of them were persuaded to go back to Blitar, or chose to surrender to the Japanese. A few of the groups successfully killed some Japanese, but all of them were eventually killed.

Finally, fifty-five captured rebels were tried in a military court and six among them were sentenced to death, while Supriyadi disappeared without a trace.

== Significance ==
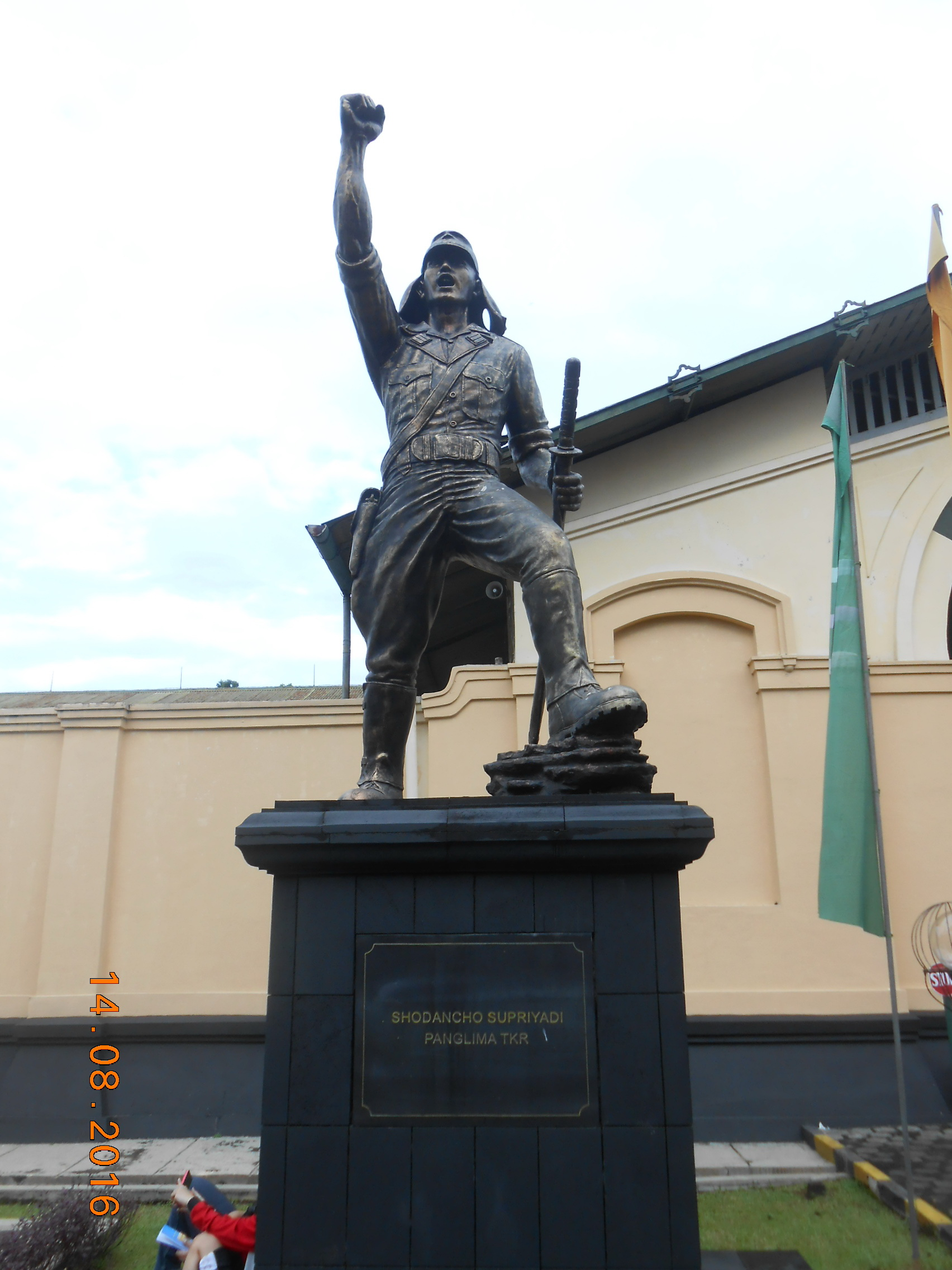
Statue of Supriyadi at the PETA Museum, dedicated to the revolt

Although the revolt was by no means successful, it had a significant influence on both Japan and Indonesia. The 1945 PETA revolt in Blitar was an important event that signaled a change in Indonesia's attitude toward Japan. Benedict Anderson, an influential academic on Southeast Asia and an expert on Indonesia, argues that while the Blitar revolt may not have instilled great fear in colonial Japan, it successfully created an atmosphere of anxiety among Japanese forces, making them wary of the changing situation in Java. Anderson provides evidence supporting his argument, noting, for instance, that the Japanese military attempted to avoid directly condemning the revolt by involving prominent Indonesian leaders in the judicial process. The Japanese court also issued relatively lenient sentences for the rebels. Overall, the revolt was the most serious attack on Japanese military forces during their occupation of Indonesia, marking the beginning of a new revolutionary period for the country.

Meanwhile, for Indonesian people, the revolt of the PETA battalion in Blitar was seen as a strong message to the Japanese forces which had behaved unfairly to the Indonesian people. Although the PETA rebellion in Blitar was very short and unsuccessful, it played a vital role in Indonesian independence by transmitting “the revolutionary energy” (p. 153) to PETA soldiers in other areas of Indonesia. Lebra Joyce, an American historian of Japan and India, in her book “Japanese-trained Armies in Southeast Asia”, exposes how the battalion in Rengasdengklok was later influenced by the Blitar revolt, kidnapping Sukarno and Hatta to proclaim the independence of Indonesia on the night of 16 August 1945. Lebra, therefore, concludes that 1945 PETA revolt in Blitar did not completely fail in achieving its ultimate goal: Indonesian independence.

== Controversies and alternative perspectives ==
Historical reality, after all, need not be embellished or hidden in order for Indonesians to be proud of their history - Sato -

Nugroho Notosusanto, an Indonesian military historian, comprehensively presents the motives, process, and termination of the Blitar revolt in his famous article “The Revolt of a PETA-Battalion in Blitar.” Though some Indonesian historians wrote about the revolt of PETA in Blitar before him, Notosusanto is the first Indonesian historian writing in English. Thus, Notosusanto's contribution in promoting the history of Blitar revolt is enormous. Without his works, the story of the Blitar revolt would be less well-known nor widely distributed among academics. His effort to conduct numerous interviews with many people who were concerned with the revolt is a praiseworthy deed. To this day, his work is the most cited academic literature relating to the 1945 PETA revolt in Blitar among scholars.

However, some also offer sharp criticism of Notosusanto's belief that 1945 PETA revolt in Blitar was a rebellion exclusively based on the strong nationalism of PETA leaders and soldiers. Shigeru Sato, an expert in Japanese occupation in Southeast Asia during World War II, disputes every aspect of Notosusanto's narrative regarding the 1945 PETA revolt. Sato might be the first academic criticizing Notosusanto's work since it was published in 1969. Sato introduces another important view on the revolt in Blitar: Japan's perspective. Sato does not completely reject nationalism as the driving force in the rebellion; however, he puts less value on Indonesian nationalism in both the revolt and its leader, Supriyadi. Sato argues that the uprising was “an isolated case caused by specific problems” rather than a case of nationalism based on rebellion against Japan. He argues that there is a possibility that Supriyadi, the leader of the rebels, was impelled to revolt not because of his nationalism or hatred of Japan, but over a small dispute over some Indonesian girls. Also, Supriyadi is held in high regard as a national hero by Indonesia, and he was even inaugurated as in absentia Minister of the People's Security in Indonesia's first cabinet formed in 1945. However, Sato refers to the interviews of Japanese officers at the time who gave less credit to Supriyadi as a great leader, because at the end of the revolt, Supriyadi allegedly ran away, deserting his supporters, and never appeared again. Sato relates the cynical interpretation of the Japanese forces on the Blitar revolt. Sato criticizes Notosusanto, and other historians following him, for attributing the cause of the rebellion too deeply to nationalism.

This alternative argument is based on the background of Notosusanto as a historian as well as the chaotic political situation in Indonesia when his works were published. In his young days, Notosusanto dreamed of being a military officer, but this was opposed by his father. In 1964, Notosusanto was a history lecturer at University of Indonesia when General Nasution of Indonesian Army Forces asked him to write an army-centered version of Indonesian independence history. After that, Notosusanto became an official historian of New Order who supported the ideology of “anti-communism, militarism, and developmentalism” held by Soeharto's regime. In other words, Notosusanto intentionally writes history that emphasizes the critical role of Indonesia's army, including PETA, during the independence struggle of Indonesia, to justify Indonesian army forces’ intervention in politics, social, and defense areas under Soeharto. It is not surprising that Katherine McGregor, a historian of Indonesia at the University of Melbourne, calls Notosusanto a “a central propagandist of the New Regime” of Indonesia. Sato warns that history can be misused as a tool of ideology in authoritarian government, and calls Notosusanto a good example of this.

Some scholars also make alternative arguments regarding the motives behind the rebellion of the PETA battalion in Blitar. However, unlike Sato, these scholars do not confront or refute Notosusanto's mainstream perspective. Rather, they suggest other factors that might have contributed to the outbreak of the rebellion. George M. Kahin, an American historian who is also an expert on Southeast Asia, discusses the possibility of PKI's influence in the Blitar revolt. In his book, “Nationalism and Revolution in Indonesia,” Kahin argues that the anti-Japanese movement led by Syarifuddin and other members of PKI (Indonesian Communist Party) since early 1943 contributed to the outbreak of PETA revolt in Blitar in February 1945. Another interesting perspective is argued by Yu Byung-sun, an editorial writer of a Korean journal, in his article “Anti-Japanese Struggle of Korean Civilian Workers Attached to the Japanese Military in Indonesia in the late Stages of Japanese Imperialism.” In examining the Ambara incident, which was an anti-Japanese armed resistance by Korean civilian workers in Indonesia which happened only forty days before the Blitar revolt, Yu argues that the Ambara incident indirectly inspired the outbreak of the Blitar revolt.

== Recommended reading ==
Anderson, Benedict. Some aspects of Indonesian politics under the Japanese occupation, 1944–1945. (Ithaca, NY: Cornell University, 1961).
Kahin, George M. Nationalism and Revolution in Indonesia. (Ithaca, NY: Cornell University, 2003).
Lebra, Joyce. C. Japanese-trained Armies in Southeast Asia. (Singapore: Institute of Southeast Asian Studies, 2010).

McGregor, Katharine E. History in Uniform: Military Ideology and the Construction of Indonesia's Past. Singapore: NUS Press, 2007a.

Notosusanto, Nugroho. “The Revolt of a PETA-Battalion in Blitar.” Asian Studies 1969; 7(1): 111–123.

Notosusanto, Nugroho. The Revolt against the Japanese of a PETA-Battalion in Blitar, February 14, 1945. (Jakarta: Dept. of Defence and Security, Centre for Armed Forces History, 1974)

Notosusanto, Nugroho. “The PETA Army in Indonesia.” in Japan in Asia, 1942-1945 (eds. William H. N), (Singapore: Singapore University Press, 1981).

Sato, Shigeru. “Gatot Mangkupraja, PETA, and the origins of the Indonesian National Army.” Bijdragen tot de Taal-, Lan-en Volenkunde 2010; 166(2/3): 189–217.

Yu, Byung-sun. “Anti-Japanese Struggle of Korean Civilian Workers Attached to the Japanese Military in Indonesia in the late Stages of Japanese Imperialism.” Journal of Korean Independence Movement Studies 2013; 44:207-245
