= Sajid Basoeki Sastrohartojo =

Indonesian diplomat (1926–1987)

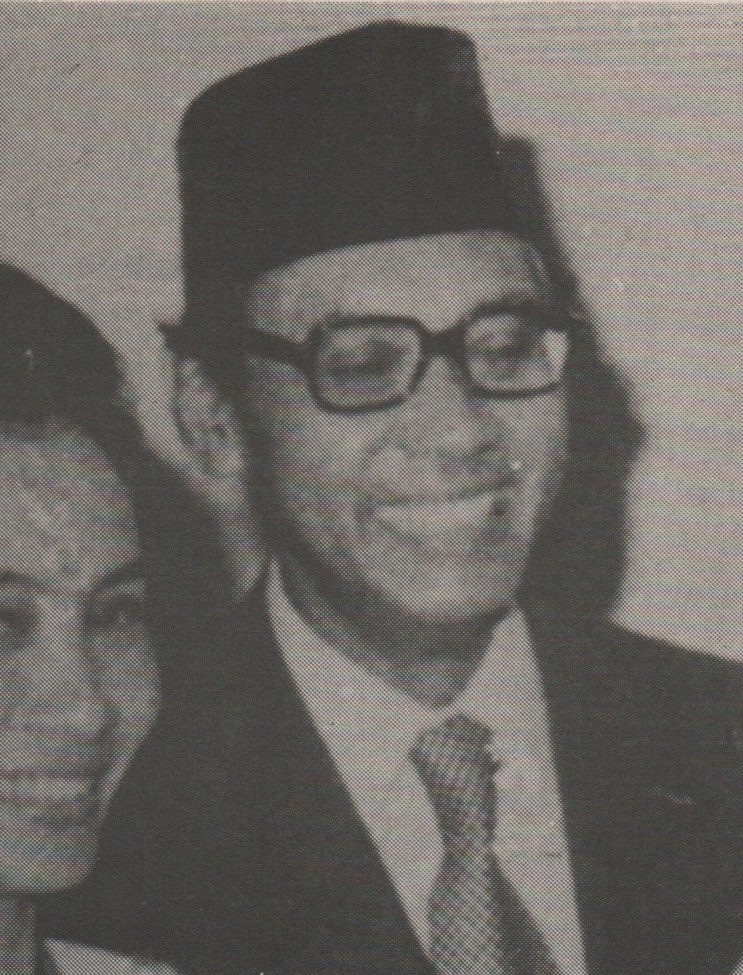

Ambassador of Indonesia to Bulgaria
- In office 18 June 1986 – 18 March 1987
- President: Suharto
- Preceded by: Akosah
- Succeeded by: Abdul Kobir Sasradipoera

Ambassador of Indonesia to Bangladesh
- In office 6 October 1979 – 12 December 1982
- President: Suharto
- Preceded by: Effendi Noor
- Succeeded by: Rachmat Sukartiko

Personal details
- Born: 6 February 1926 Surakarta, Dutch East Indies
- Died: 18 March 1987 (aged 61)
- Spouse: Simarni
- Children: 3
- Education: Foreign Service Academy

Sajid Basoeki Sastrohartojo (6 February 1926 – 18 March 1987) was an Indonesian career diplomat. He served as ambassador to Bangladesh from 1979 to 1982 and to Bulgaria from 1986 until his death in 1987.

== Diplomatic career ==
Born on 6 February 1926 in Surakarta, Sajid entered the Foreign Service Academy in 1949. He passed his propadeutics in 1951 and graduated in 1953. His first overseas posting was at the consulate general in Singapore, where he served as vice consul from 1954 to 1957. Following a domestic stint at the foreign ministry, from 1961 to 1968 he was posted at the embassy in Iraq. He was then appointed as consul general in Paramaribo, Netherlands Suriname, in March 1971, and served until June 1975. Early in his tenure in Suriname, in 1971 Sajid recruited an Indonesian Dance Academy graduate to promote Indonesian dance to the Suriname populace.

After a brief posting in Paris from 1978 to 1979, on 6 October 1979 Sajid was installed as ambassador to Bangladesh. Following a meeting with the parliament chairperson Daryatmo five days after his swearing in, Basuki departed for his new posting. In early 1981, shortly before the assassination of president Ziaur Rahman, Suharto called upon Sajid and instructed him to improve bilateral relations between Indonesia and Bangladesh. Sajid's ambassadorial term ended on 12 December 1982, and he returned to become the chief of personnel bureau of the foreign department. He was installed as ambassador to Bulgaria on 16 June 1986 and served until his death on 18 March 1987. He was buried at the Tanah Kusir public cemetery.

== Personal life ==
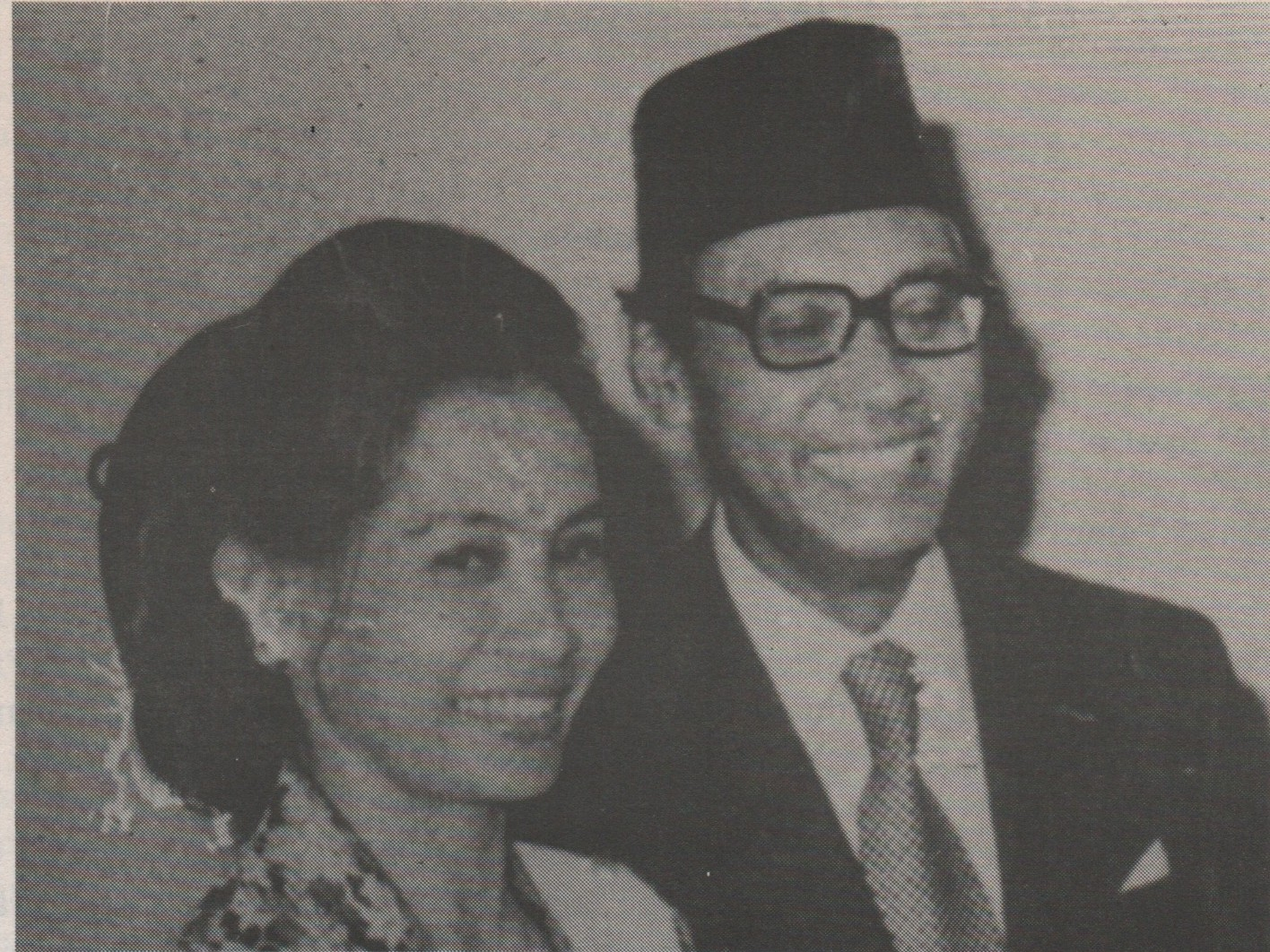
Sajid Basoeki Sastrohartojo and wife

Sajid was married to Simarni and has three children: Hadiati, Dajanti, and Afianto.
