= Sulyoadikusumo =

Indonesian judge, soldier, politician (1903–after 1946)

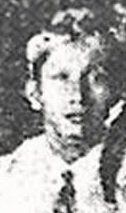
- Sulyoadikusumo in 1932

Minister of People's Security Ad interim
- In office 20 October 1945 – 14 November 1945
- Preceded by: Supriyadi
- Succeeded by: Amir Sjarifuddin

Personal details
- Born: 18 April 1903 Magetan, Dutch East Indies

Raden Mas Imam Muhammad Sulyoadikusumo (Note: Variously spelled as Suliyoadikusumo, Suljoadikusumo, Suliyo Hadikusumo, etc.) (18 April 1903 – after 3 July 1946) was an Indonesian judge and military officer. He briefly served as ad interim defense minister in the country's first cabinet between October and November 1945. He had worked as a court officer and later a judge during the colonial period, and became a battalion commander in the Defenders of the Homeland militia.

== Early life ==
Sulyoadikusumo was born on 18 April 1903 in Magetan, in present-day East Java. He studied at a Volks School (People's School), and later at a Hollandsch-Inlandsche School where he graduated in 1920. He continued his studies at a Dutch middle school (MULO), then studied law at a law school where he graduated in 1927.

== Career ==
After completing his studies, he began to work at the Yogyakarta landraad (district court) as an assistant in the court, before moving to Malang in 1929 to become a court's treasurer. He also filled this position in the Bondowoso court. He was further active in nationalist organizations, joining the Jong Islamieten Bond (Islamic Youth Association) and becoming its vice-chair in 1929, along with the Islamic Study Club (Islam Studieclub). He became a good friend of Mohammad Roem in this period. Sulyoadikusumo was also part of the leadership of the Indonesian Islamic Union Party.

He remained in Malang until the Japanese invasion of the Dutch East Indies in 1942, and during the Japanese occupation period he became judge at the Malang court. When the Defenders of the Homeland (PETA) militia was formed as auxiliary troops, he was appointed a battalion commander (daidancho) for the PETA battalion in Lumajang.

Upon the proclamation of Indonesian independence and the start of the Indonesian National Revolution, Sulyoadikusumo was appointed by the Republican government as vice resident of Malang and as deputy minister of defense (termed "People's Security") under the missing Supriyadi. Sulyoadikusumo's was elevated to ad interim minister following the outbreak of the Battle of Semarang, where he was flown in as an envoy of the Republican government in talks with Allied forces. He then visited Surabaya, but was arrested and detained there by local military leader Moestopo, who proceeded to claim Sulyoadikusumo's defense minister office (later dropping the claim).

On 12 November 1945, a meeting was held between key military leaders of the People's Security Army to select the new military leadership. According to Roem, Sulyoadikusumo who was present as a representative of the civilian government lost control of the meeting, and the military commanders elected Yogyakarta Sultan Hamengkubuwono IX as defense minister and Sudirman as armed forces commander. Newly appointed Prime Minister Sutan Sjahrir instead chose Amir Sjarifuddin as defense minister to replace Sulyoadikusumo.

== Later career ==
After his removal as minister, Sulyoadikusumo was involved in the trials and the handling of a coup attempt in July 1946. He largely disappeared from historical records afterwards, with a 1988 magazine article noting that the office of defense minister Benny Moerdani lacked Sulyoadikusumo's picture as they were unable to find one.
