= Mohamad Mangundiprojo =

Indonesian soldier and civil servant

Personal details
- Born: 5 January 1905 Sragen, Dutch East Indies
- Died: 13 December 1988 (aged 83) Bandar Lampung, Indonesia
- Occupation: Civil servant, Prosecutor
- Awards: National Hero of Indonesia

Military service
- Allegiance: Indonesia
- Branch/service: People's Security Forces
- Years of service: 1944–1949
- Rank: Major General
- Battles/wars: Second World War; Indonesian National Revolution; Battle of Surabaya

Major General Mohamad Mangundiprojo was an Indonesian military officer, revolutionary, and civil servant. Born in the Sragen Regency on the island of Java, Mangundiprojo joined a nationalist group during the Second World War. He later fought in the Indonesian National Revolution against the return of Dutch colonial authority to Indonesia, and later went on to become a politician.

== Early life ==
Mohamad Mangundiprojo was born on 5 January 1905 in the Javanese province (which are referred to as regencies) of Sragen. At the time, Java and many other provinces constituted the Dutch East Indies, a colonial possession ruled by the Netherlands. Mangoendiprodjo's family had a history of fighting against the Dutch; his great grandfather had served the Sultanate of Demak and had fought alongside Diponegoro, a 19th-century Javanese noble who had opposed Dutch rule in the Java War.

During his formative years, Mangundiprojo chose to pursue a career of becoming a civil servant in the Dutch colonial government. In 1926, he graduated from a Dutch-operated university on Java and planned to join the Municipal Police. However, he instead became a prosecutor in the Jombang Regency.

== Japanese occupation ==
During World War II, the Japanese army invaded and occupied Java in 1942. The Japanese dismantled much of the island's colonial infrastructure and chose to support nationalist movements which would oppose the return of Dutch authorities. On such effort was PETA, a volunteer army unit which Mangundiprojo joined in 1944. Before being deployed, he received a military education Surabaya; he was then given command of a unit in the Sidoarjo Regency in East Java. When the war ended in 1945, many of the PETA units were disarmed. However, many soldiers and officers, including Mangundiprojo, maintained their military training and discipline.

== Indonesian National Revolution ==
=== Battle of Surabaya ===
With the world war II over, the Dutch government sought to regain control over its former colony in Indonesia, which had declared itself independent from the Netherlands on 17 August 1945.

On 26 October, British soldiers and men from the Netherlands Indies Civil Administration landed in Surabaya to occupy the city, which had recently been evacuated by the Japanese garrison. This act caused tensions to flair between the British and the local Indonesians, many of whom now considered themselves to be citizens of an independent Indonesia. Violence soon began, and soon former members of PETA, including Mangundiprojo, formed units to fight against the British forces.

A ceasefire was called on 29 October, Chief of Staff Indonesian armed forces, Oerip Soemohardjo, and local military leader Moestopo, selected Mangundiprojo to work with the British to ensure the ceasefire was maintained. In 30 October, While touring the Surabaya city with British brigadier general Aubertin Walter Sothern Mallaby, the British officer attempted to secure the safe return of a group of Anglo-Indian soldiers whom had been surrounded by a crowd of independence supporters. However, the situation escalated when Mangundiprojo was captured by the Anglo-Indian soldiers, and in the confusion, Mallaby was killed by members of the crowd while the brigadier sheltered in his car. His death provoked a reprisal by the British, starting the Battle of Surabaya.

Later, Mangundiprojo fought during the battle against the British. During the later Indonesian war of Independence, Mangundiprojo played a role in seizing a large sum of money that the Dutch colonial authorities were keeping in a bank.

== Post-Independence ==
After the war of Independence, Mangundiprojo joined the Indonesian civil service. He served as the Regent of Ponorogo from 1951 to 1955.

== Death ==
Mangundiprojo died in Bandar Lampung in 1988. In 2014, he was posthumously named as a National Hero of Indonesia.
