= Isdiman Suryokusumo =

Personal details
- Born: July 12, 1913 Pontianak, West Kalimantan
- Died: November 26, 1945 (aged 32) Ambarawa, Central Java

Military service
- Allegiance: Indonesia
- Years of service: 5 October 1945 – 26 November 1945
- Rank: Colonel (Posthumously)
- Battles/wars: Indonesian National Revolution; Battle of Ambarawa † (DOW)
- His final rank was Lieutenant-Colonel, But because he fell short in the task, he was given "Kenaikan Pangkat Luar Biasa ( Extraordinary Ranks ), becoming Colonel (Posthumously).

Isdiman Suryokusumo was an officer of the Tentara Keamanan Rakyat (People's Security Army), and former commander of the Banyumas Regiment of the People's Security Army as well as a middle officer in the Indonesian military system. He was one of the heroes who were killed in action during the conflict that took place in Ambarawa, Semarang, Jawa Tengah.

== Background ==
Lt. Col. Isdiman was born in Pontianak on July 12, 1913. He had attended Bojonegoro Junior High School. Isdiman's childhood was spent in Cianjur. He was best known for playing a major role in the Ambarawa conflict during the Indonesian National Revolution. He was a confidant of Colonel Soedirman who was responsible for organizing the battle in Ambarawa. He led the fighters in the war in Ambarawa against the Allies.

Indonesian forces led by Lt. Col. Isdiman tried to liberate the two villages that the Allies wanted to control. However, Lt. Col. Isdiman was instead seriously wounded by the air attack and taken to Magelang, but Lt. Col. Isdiman was killed on his way there. After the incident, the Central Kedu Regiment under the leadership of Letkol. M. Sarbini immediately set up a pursuit against them.

Lt. Col. Isdiman is remembered as a hero, with great spirit, pumping the fighting blood of young guerrillas. His name is immortalized in the name of a street in Purwakarta, Overste Isdiman Street, or Ovis Road.
