= M. Sarbini =

Indonesian military officer

General TNI (Posthumously) Mas Sarbini Martodihardjo
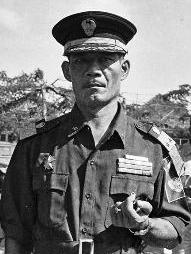
- M. Sarbini with the rank of Major General, 1966

2nd Chairman of the National Quartermaster of the Scout Movement
- In office 27 November 1974 – 21 August 1977
- President: Suharto
- Preceded by: Hamengkubuwana IX
- Succeeded by: Mashudi

5th Indonesian Minister of Transmigration and Cooperatives
- In office 17 October 1967 – 11 September 1971
- President: Seharto
- Preceded by: Sujono Suparto
- Succeeded by: Radius Prawiro

12th Coordinating Minister of Defense and Security of Indonesia
- In office 24 February 1966 – 28 August 1966
- President: Sukarno
- Preceded by: A. H. Nasution
- Succeeded by: Suharto

5th Indonesian Minister of Veterans and Demobilization
- In office 27 August 1964 – 22 February 1966
- President: Sukarno
- Preceded by: Sambas Atmadinata
- Succeeded by: Basuki Rahmat
- In office 31 March 1966 – 11 October 1967
- President: Sukarno; Suharto
- Preceded by: Basuki Rahmat
- Succeeded by: Departments are diverted

Personal details
- Born: June 10, 1914 Indrosari, Buluspesantren, Kebumen, Central Java, Dutch East Indies
- Died: August 21, 1977 (aged 63) Jakarta, Indonesia
- Party: Independent (1942–1977)
- Spouse: Ny. Salami binti R. Sastrowihardjo
- Children: Saryanto Sarbini, Ny. Suripto Sarbini, Ny. Dwi Sarbini
- Parents: M. Martoredjo (father); Sukinah (mother)
- Education: Military Academy
- Occupation: TNI
- Religion: Islam
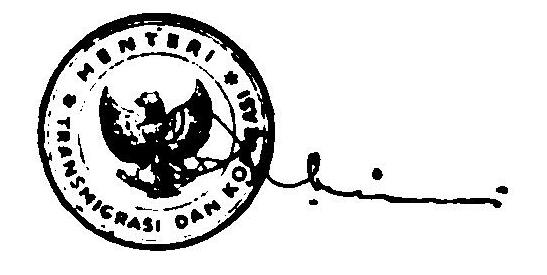
- Signature

Military service
- Allegiance: Japan (1942–45); Indonesia (1945–71)
- Branch/service: PETA; TNI
- Years of service: 1942–1971
- Rank: General TNI (Posthumously)
- Unit: Infantry
- Battles/wars: Indonesian National Revolution

Mas Sarbini Martodihardjo was a General Purnawirawan.

== Early life ==
He was born in Indrosari Indonesia.

== Military career ==
He served during the struggle both in the military and government of the Republic of Indonesia. On 20 October 1945, as a Lieutenant-Colonel, he led the forces of the People's Security Army (TKR) of the Central Kedu Regiment and surrounded the Allied and NICA armies in Jambu, Ambarawa which later became known as the Battle of Ambarawa.

During the reign of Sukarno, as a Major General Sarbini served as Minister of Defence of the Republic of Indonesia in the Dwikora II cabinet in 1966. He was later replaced by Army Lieutenant General Suharto.

His military career began from an option education PETA (Chudanco) in Bogor. He finished his education in 1942 and in 1945 was appointed as Chudanco Saidan II PETA in Gombong, Kebumen. After Japan lost in World War II and PETA disbanded, Sarbini returned to his hometown where he formed the People's Security Barrier (BKR) Kebumen branch and served as chairman in September 1945. Shortly thereafter, he was appointed Commander of the Kedu I Regiment of the TKR II Division stationed in Magelang with the rank of Lieutenant Colonel. When Madiun Affair happened, he was diligent in cleaning up the remnants of the TDR (PKI). When Politionele acties happen, as Commander of STC WK II, he led the guerrilla in the area of Magelang to Banyumas.

== Family ==
He married on August 24, 1944, to Salami daughter of R. Sastrowihardjo in Kutoarjo, Purworejo.

== Department History ==
- Commander of Kedu Regiment I Division II TKR based in Magelang
- Commander of STC Division III Diponegoro in Magelang (1945)
- Commander STC/WK II (1945)
- XI Brigade Commander of IV Diponegoro Division in Pekalongan (1949–1950)
- R Brigade Commander in Pati (1950)
- Brigade Commander O Mangkubumi/XIII Regiment IV Diponegoro Division (1951)
- Minister of Veterans Affairs and Demobilization (1964)

== Legacy ==
Sarbini was widely known as the father of Indonesian veterans and the Veteran building in Semanggi, Central Jakarta is named for him. In memory of his services, the SMK General M. Sarbini school was eastablshed in his birthplace.

Sarbini died on 21 August 1977 and was buried in the Main National Hero Cemetery Park of Kalibata.
