= Pembela Tanah Air Museum =

Museum in Bogor, Indonesia

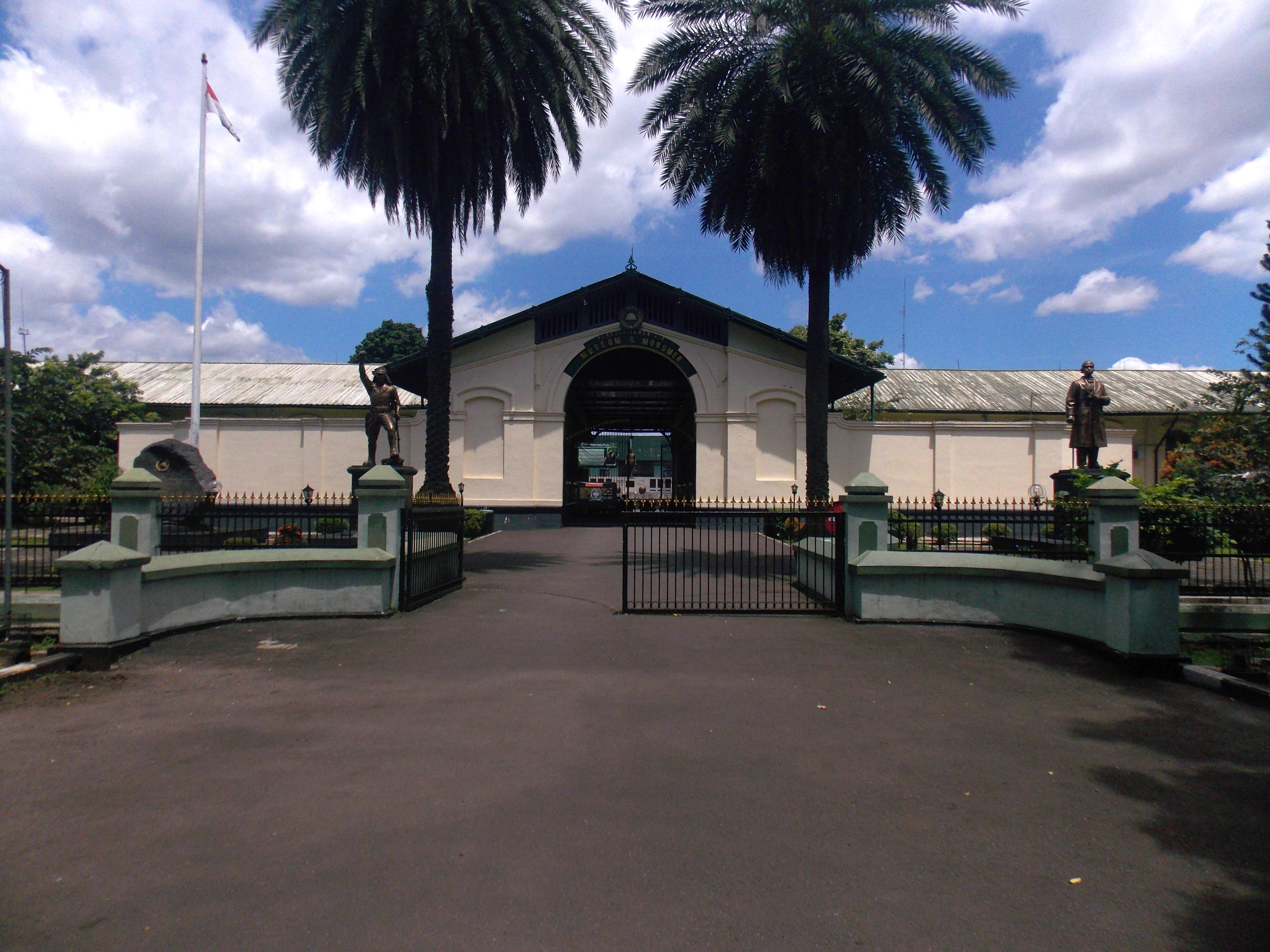
Entrance gate

Pembela Tanah Air Museum (PETA Museum) is museum in Bogor, Indonesia. It was established to provide a tribute to former soldiers (PETA) for their contributions in establishing the nation. The museum also gives an overview of Indonesia's independence struggle and preparation to fulfil its independence.

== History ==
The original building housing the museum was built in 1745 by colonial army soldiers in a European (British) style. In 1943, the building was used as an army training centre (still under the control of Japan). Development of the PETA Museum began on 14 November 1993 with the laying of the first stone by Vice President Umar Wirahadikusumah. The development took approximately two years and was inaugurated by President Suharto on December 18, 1995.

== See also ==
- List of museums and cultural institutions in Indonesia
- Defenders of the Homeland
