= Gatot Mangkoepradja =

Indonesian national hero

Gatot Mangkoepradja, also spelled Gatot Mangkupraja, (25 December 1898 – 4 October 1968) was an Indonesian national hero, activist and politician, who suggested the formation of the Pembela Tanah Air (PETA) militia during the Japanese occupation of the Dutch East Indies.

== Biography ==
Gatot was born in Sumedang, West Java, on 15 December 1898. His father was a distinguished physician who also engaged in the management of various enterprises.

In 1913, Gatot enrolled at the Sekolah Dokter Djawa, which that same year was renamed STOVIA. Inspired by the rise of Budi Utomo, he and several fellow students established the Paguyuban Pasundan (Pasundan Association). Gatot, however, did not complete his studies at the institution. Later he enrolled at Hoogere Burger School (HBS, public high school) in Bandung, but once again, he did not complete his studies there.

He worked for national railway company in Bandung from 1922 until 1926. Gatot joined Algemeene Studieclub (General Study Club), an organization endorsed by Cipto Mangunkusumo, sometime after its foundation. There he met Sukarno.

In 1927, Gatot, together with Sukarno, helped establish the Perserikatan Nasional Indonesia (PNI, Indonesian Nationalist Union), which later became the Partai Nasional Indonesia (PNI, Indonesian National Party). Sukarno was elected chairman, while Gatot served as secretary. In December 1929, both were arrested by the Dutch authorities during a PNI congress in Yogyakarta. Gatot received a two-year prison sentence, while Sukarno was sentenced to four years. They were confined in Banceuy Prison near Bandung and were released in 1931.

In 1933, Gatot joined a commercial and cultural visit to Japan organized by journalist Parada Harahap. During the trip, he also attended the Pan-Asian Congress in Tokyo as one of the Indonesian delegates, where he met prominent Japanese figures as well as Asian nationalist leaders, including Subhas Chandra Bose from India and Emilio Aguinaldo from the Philippines. Two years later, in 1935, he undertook another journey to Japan with the covert purpose of strengthening political ties and holding discussions with members of the Japanese military regarding preparations for war and strategies to achieve Indonesian independence. Colonial authorities, aware of his growing connections with Japanese circles in Java, subsequently began monitoring his activities closely. Under Japanese occupation, Gatot and Sukarno collaborated with the Japanese.

== Works cited ==
- Lubis, Nina H., ed. (2003). Gatot Mangkoepradja, 1898–1968 (in Indonesian). Bandung: Unpad Press.
- Sato, Shigeru (2010). "Gatot Mangkupraja, PETA, and the origins of the Indonesian National Army". Bijdragen tot de Taal-, Land- en Volkenkunde. 166 (2–3). Brill: 189–217. doi:10.1163/22134379-90003663.
