= Supriyadi =

Indonesian WWII national hero (born 1923)

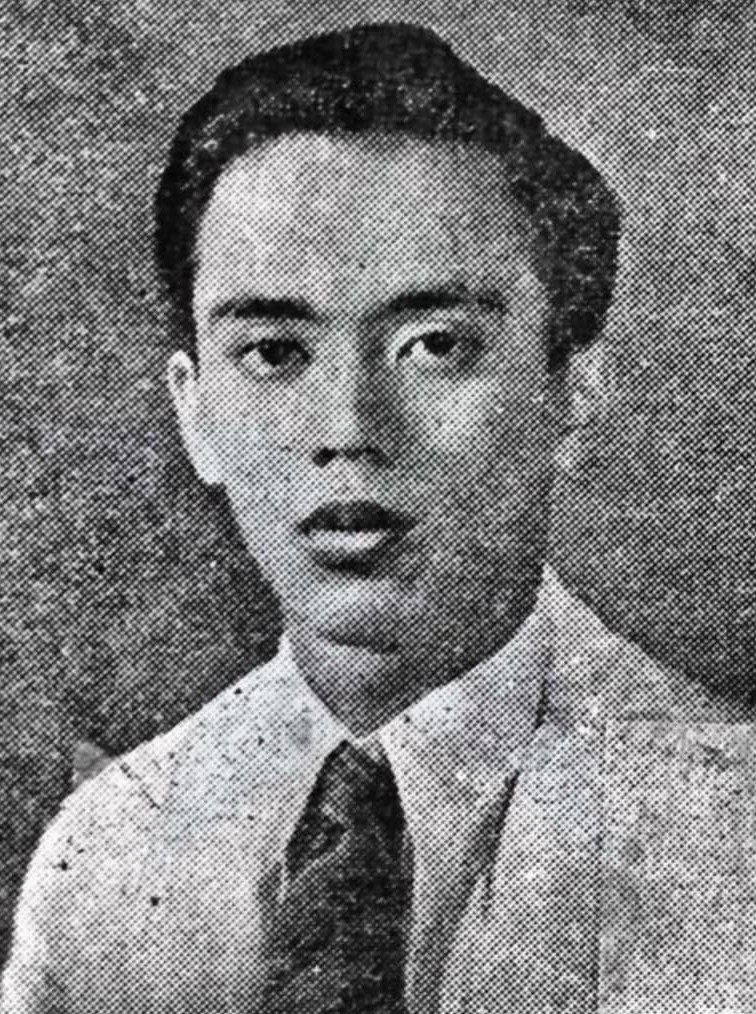
- Portrait of Supriyadi, c. 1940

1st Minister of People's Security
- Designate (Note: Office never taken)
- In office 19 August 1945 – 20 October 1945
- President: Sukarno
- Preceded by: Office established
- Succeeded by: Sulyoadikusumo (acting); Amir Sjarifuddin

Commander of the People's Security Forces
- Designate
- In office 5 October 1945 – 12 November 1945
- President: Sukarno
- Preceded by: Office established
- Succeeded by: Lt. Gen. Sudirman

Personal details
- Born: 13 April 1923 Trenggalek, Oost-Java, Dutch East Indies

Military service
- Allegiance: Empire of Japan; Indonesia
- Branch/service: Defenders of the Homeland
- Years of service: 1943–1945
- Rank: Platoon commander
- Commands: PETA platoon, Blitar; Indonesian Armed Forces (formally; never taken)
- Battles/wars: World War II; Blitar PETA revolt
- Awards: National Hero of Indonesia (posthumous, 1975)
- Disappeared: 14 February 1945 (aged 21); Blitar, Japanese East Indies
- Status: Declared dead in absentia 9 August 1975

Fransiskus Xaverius Soeprijadi, also known as Supriyadi or Soeprijadi (born 13 April 1923 – disappeared 14 February 1945, declared dead 9 August 1975), was an Indonesian national hero who rebelled against the occupying Japanese in 1945.

== Early life ==
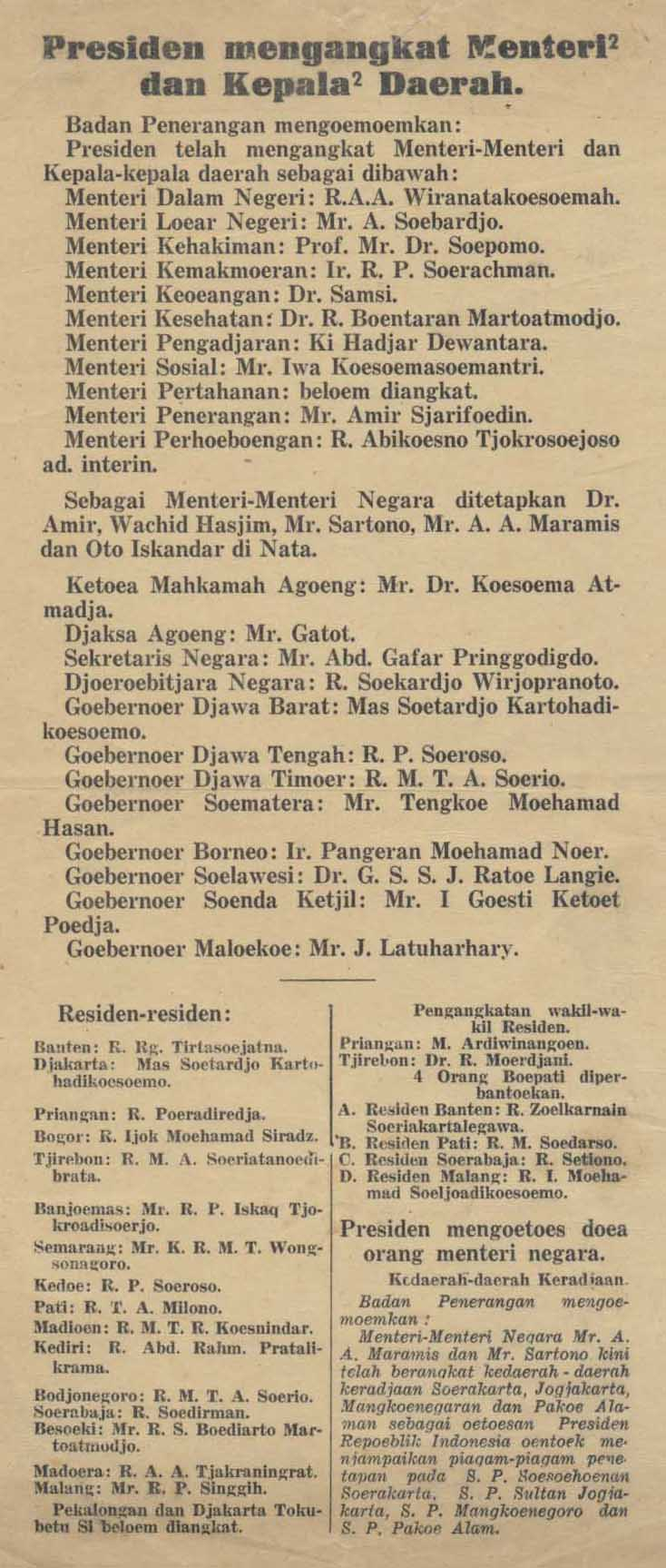
In this 1945 newspaper report, Minister of Defense (Menteri Pertahanan) is listed as "not yet appointed" (beloem diangkat). This is due to uncertainties about Supriyadi's fate.

Supriyadi was born in Trenggalek on 13 April 1923. He attended junior high school, then a training school for civil service in Magelang. However, the Japanese invaded Indonesia before he graduated. He then switched to high school and underwent youth training (Seimendoyo) in Tangerang, West Java.

== Involvement with PETA ==
In October 1943, the Japanese established a militia, PETA (Indonesian: Pembela Tanah Air, lit. 'Defenders of the Homeland') to assist Japanese forces against the Allies. Supriyadi joined PETA, and after training was posted to Blitar. He was tasked with overseeing the work of the Romusha forced laborers. The plight of these workers inspired him to rebel against the Japanese. When Supriyadi joined PETA, he was given the rank of shodancho or platoon commander.

== Blitar revolt ==
When nationalist leader Sukarno visited his parents in Blitar, PETA officers told him that they had begun to plan a rebellion and asked for Sukarno's opinion. He told them to consider the consequences, but Supriyadi, leader of the rebels, was convinced the uprising would succeed.

In the early hours of 14 February 1945, rebels attacked Japanese troops, causing heavy casualties. However, the Japanese defeated the rebellion and put the ringleaders on trial. Six (or eight) people were sentenced to death and the rest were given jail sentences ranging from three years to life. However, Supriyadi reportedly was not executed. Some said Supriyadi escaped and hid from the Japanese. He was not seen again after the failure of the rebellion.

== Disappearance ==
On 19 August 1945, in a government decree issued by the newly independent Indonesia, Supriyadi was named Minister for Public Security in the Presidential Cabinet. However, he failed to appear, and was replaced on 20 October by acting minister Muhammad Suliyoadikusumo. To this day his fate remains unknown.

Numerous sightings before his disappearance had been reported. Ronomejo a kamituwo of Ngliman village in Nganjuk reportedly accompanied Supriyadi to his hiding place in a cave near Sedudo waterfall. However, when Supriyadi's father, Damardi visited the place he already left. According to M. Nakajima, director of Taisei International Corporation, Supriyadi and his two companions stayed for a day in his place in Salatiga around February and March 1945, but then left before Kenpeitai from Semarang arrived.

If he was alive during his appointment and took the office, he would have been aged 22 and became the youngest ever minister in the nation's history. He was officially bestowed the title of National Hero on 9 August 1975, thus legally declaring him dead as the title is only given posthumously.

== See also ==
- List of people who disappeared mysteriously: 1910–1990

== Bibliography ==
- Album Pahlawan Bangsa [Album of National Heroes]. Jakarta: Mutiara Sumber Widya. 1999.
- M. C. Ricklefs (1982). A History of Modern Indonesia. Macmillan Southeast Asian reprint. ISBN 0-333-24380-3.
- P. N. H. Simanjuntak (2003). Kabinet-Kabinet Republik Indonesia: Dari Awal Kemerdekaan Sampai Reformasi [Cabinets of the Republic of Indonesia: From the Start of Independence to the Reform Era]. Jakarta: Djambatan. ISBN 9789794284995.
- Sudarmanto, Y.B. (1996). Jejak-Jejak Pahlawan dari Sultan Agung hingga Syekh Yusuf [The Footsteps of Heroes from Sultan Agung to Syekh Yusuf]. Jakarta: Grasindo. ISBN 979-553-111-5.
- Mr.Soediharjo (1970). Riwajat Pahlawan Indonesia [Biography of Indonesian Heroes]. Medan.
- Cribb, Robert (2008). Gangsters and Revolutionaries: The Jakarta People's Militia and the Indonesian Revolution, 1945-1949. Equinox. ISBN 9789793780719.
