= G. M. Soeparmin =

Indonesian military officer and member of parliament

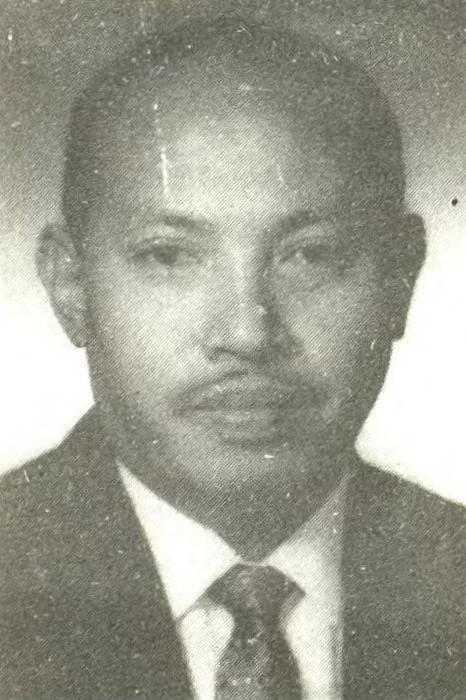

Member of the People's Representative Council
- In office 28 October 1971 – 1 October 1977
- President: Suharto
- Parliamentary group: Armed Forces

Personal details
- Born: 15 October 1921 Malang, Dutch East Indies
- Died: 25 February 1983 (aged 61) Jakarta, Indonesia

Military service
- Allegiance: Indonesia
- Branch/service: Army
- Years of service: 1945–1977
- Rank: Brigadier General
- Commands: 521st Infantry Battalion

G. M. Soeparmin (15 October 1921 – 25 February 1983) was an Indonesian military officer who became a member of the People's Representative Council from 1971 until 1977.

== Early life ==
Soeparmin was born on 15 October 1921 in the city of Malang. He began his education at the Hollands Inlandsche School (Dutch school for indigenous Indonesians) and finished in 1935. He then continued to the Meer Uitgebried Lager Onderwijs (Junior High School) and graduated in 1939.

== Military career ==
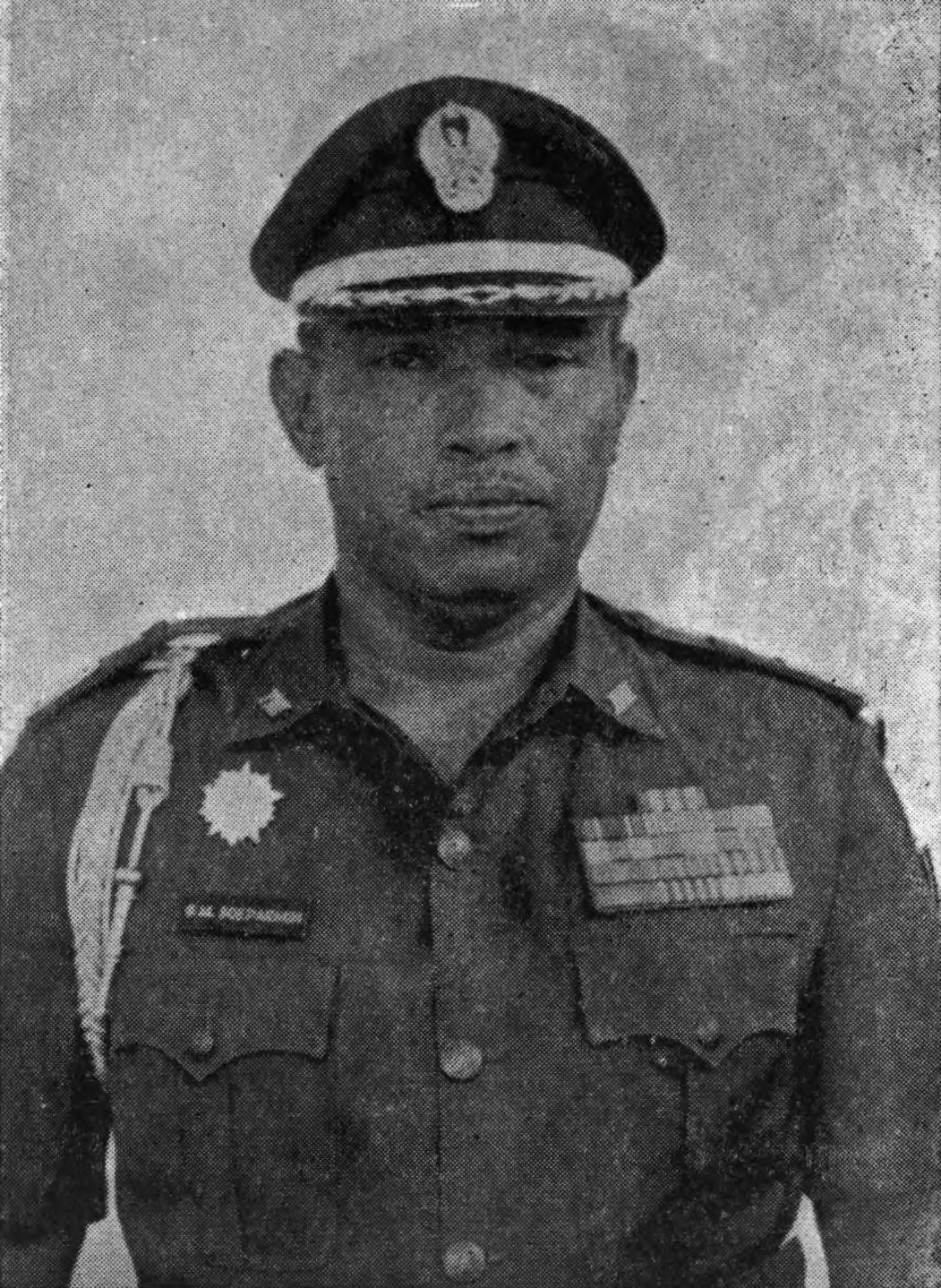
Soeparmin as the Deputy Head of the Indonesian Army History Center

Soeparmin entered the military during the Japanese occupation of the Dutch East Indies and served in the Japanese-sponsored Defenders of the Homeland. After Indonesia proclaimed its independence in 1945, Soeparmin joined the newly formed Indonesian Army and served as a company commander from 1951. He was promoted afterward and commanded several battalions from 1951 until 1957.

After commanding various military units, Soeparmin was rotated to the army headquarters and became a subaltern officer without any position. He was appointed as the chief of staff of the Udayana Regional Military Command two years later and served from 1959 until 1964.

He was instructed by his superior to attend military courses at the Indonesian Army Command and General Staff College for several months in 1965. He was made the Deputy Head of the Army Information Bureau shortly after finishing the courses and obtained the permit for wearing the Command and Staff Insignia in December 1965.

Soeparmin was rotated again after serving as deputy head for about four years. On 12 September 1969, he became the Deputy Head of the Indonesian Army History Center. His brief stint in the military history center ended in October 1971 after his appointment as a member of the People's Representative Council from the armed forces group.

During his tenure as a member of parliament, Soeparmin was promoted from colonel to brigadier general. Seven months before the end of his term in October 1977, Soeparmin went to Singapore as a part of a parliamentary delegation.

== Later life and death ==
After his retirement from the parliament and military, Soeparmin became a Manggala (lecturer) at the BP-7 (Center for Socialization and Internalization of the State Ideology Pancasila). Soeparmin was also active at the Jakarta Retired Soldiers' Association as the organization's deputy chairman. He died on 25 February 1983 in Jakarta.

== Religious life ==
Soeparmin was a Roman Catholic.
