= Amir Machmud =

Indonesian military general (1923-1995)

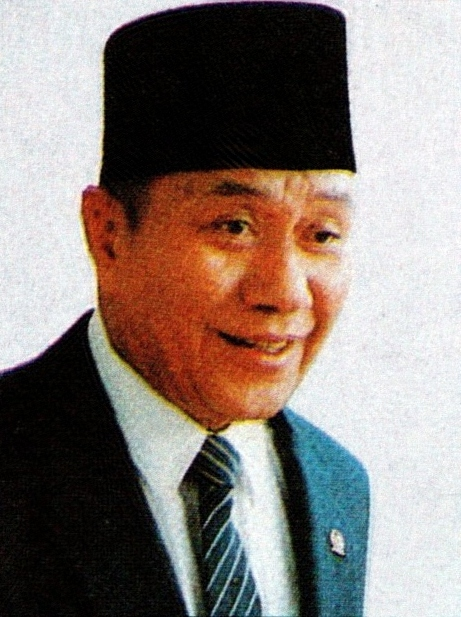
- Official portrait, 1985

6th Speaker of the People's Consultative Assembly
- In office 1 October 1982 – 30 September 1987
- Preceded by: Daryatmo
- Succeeded by: Kharis Suhud

9th Speaker of the House of Representatives
- In office 1 October 1982 – 30 September 1987
- Preceded by: Daryatmo
- Succeeded by: Kharis Suhud

17th Minister of Home Affairs
- In office 9 January 1969 – 19 March 1983
- President: Suharto
- Preceded by: Basuki Rahmat
- Succeeded by: Soepardjo Rustam

Personal details
- Born: 21 February 1923 Cimahi, Dutch East Indies
- Died: 21 April 1995 (aged 72) Cimahi, Indonesia
- Education: Indonesian Military Academy
- Occupation: Politician; army officer

Military service
- Allegiance: Empire of Japan; Indonesia
- Branch/service: Defenders of the Homeland; Indonesian Army
- Years of service: 1943–1978
- Rank: General
- Unit: Infantry
- Battles/wars: Indonesian National Revolution
- Service no.: 11646

General (Ret.) Amir Machmud (21 February 1923 – 21 April 1995) was an Indonesian military general who was an eyewitness to the signing of the Supersemar document transferring power from President Sukarno to General Suharto.

== Early life ==
Amir Machmud was born on 21 February 1923 in Cimahi, West Java. He was the second of five siblings and his father worked for a public company under the Dutch Colonial Government. He was educated at the "Ardjoena" Hollandsch-Inlandsche School in Bandung, graduating in 1938. He continued his education at a technical school for a further two years, and then in 1941 he took a topography course.

== Military career ==
=== Japanese occupation ===
In 1942, the Dutch colonial government was defeated by the Japanese Imperial Army and Indonesia came under the occupation of the Japanese Empire. By 1943, with the tide of the war beginning to turn against them, the Japanese established Defenders of the Homeland (PETA), an auxiliary force made up of Indonesians designed to bolster the number of troops for the Japanese and assist them in fighting a possible Allied invasion of Java. Amir Machmud joined PETA in 1943 and remained a member until 1945.

=== Career in the Sukarno era ===
On 17 August 1945, nationalist leaders Sukarno and Mohammad Hatta proclaimed Indonesia's Independence. Days later, the Preparatory Committee for Indonesian Independence (PPKI) announced the establishment of the People's Security Body (BKR). were formed and Amir Machmud headed a unit in Lembang, West Java.

In 1946, after the People's Security Army (TKR) had been established, the Lembang BKR was integrated into the Siliwangi Division, a military regional command responsible for the security of West Java.

The Siliwangi Division was then forced to leave West Java in 1948 after the signing of the Renville Agreement. Under this agreement, the Indonesian government was forced to recognize territories that had been taken under Dutch Control including West Java. Under the command of Colonel Abdul Haris Nasution, the division was relocated to Central Java.

After the end of the War of Independence, the military was reorganized into seven "Territories and Armies" (Teritorium dan Tentara). Amir Machmud remained with the Siliwangi T&T until 1960, ending his time in command of troops in Bandung. He studied at the Army Staff College (Seskoad) Here, he learned about politics and economics, important subjects for a soldier in an army increasingly involved in the running of the Government. He also became acquainted with Suharto during his time at Seskoad.

Once he had completed his Seskoad course, Amir Machmud was appointed Caduad Deputy Chief of Staff of the Army General Reserve (Caduad), who would go on to become Kostrad, which was a strategic force that was designed to be on standby at all times so that it could easily be summoned during any national emergency. Caduad was commanded by Suharto.

Amir Machmud would now have his first stint as a Regional Commander. On 5 September 1962, he was appointed Commander of KODAM X/Lambung Mangkurat, which was responsible for the security of South Kalimantan. He held the post until 1965.

On 1 October 1965, the 30 September Movement made a coup attempt in Jakarta. The movement announced the formation of a Revolutionary Council which included Amir Machmud as a member. Like many other anti-Communist Generals who were on the list, he was quick to deny membership. The day would finish with Suharto taking back control of the situation in Jakarta and the PKI being accused of being behind the coup attempt.

=== Transition to New Order ===
In December 1965, Amir Machmud was appointed Commander of KODAM V/Jaya and he was now responsible for the security of Jakarta and its surrounding areas.

There was a duality to Amir Machmud's stance at this point. Politically, he was with Suharto, the Army, and the anti-Sukarno protesters. At the same time, however, he felt a professional responsibility to prevent Jakarta from being reduced to chaos by all the protests and demonstrations. In February, Amir Machmud banned protests in Jakarta.

It was dusk when the decree that would become the Supersemar was finally prepared and awaiting Sukarno's signature. Sukarno had some last-minute doubts but Amir Machmud, the other two generals, and members of Sukarno's inner circle in the cabinet who had also made the trip to Bogor encouraged him to sign. Sukarno finally signed and handed the Supersemar to Basuki to be passed on to Suharto. On the way back to Jakarta, Amir Machmud asked to read the document and seemed shocked to find out that it was a handover of power to Suharto.

== Political career ==
=== Minister of Home Affairs ===
As Suharto removed Sukarno from power and replaced him as president in 1967, Amir Machmud continued as Commander of Kodam V/Jaya. In early 1969, Basuki, who became the Minister of Home Affairs died suddenly. Amir Machmud was then transferred from his position as Commander to Kodam V/Jaya to take Basuki's place as Minister of Home Affairs, a position he held until his resignation in October 1982.

During his tenure as Minister of Home Affairs, Amir Machmud developed a reputation of being tough on government opponents and dissidents. This earned him the nickname of "The Bulldozer".

Amir Machmud also helped strengthen Suharto's control over Indonesia. In 1969, he banned civil servants from being involved in politics but would encourage them to vote to Golkar in Legislative Elections as a sign of loyalty to the government.

=== Chairman of the MPR and DPR ===
In October 1982, Amir Machmud was elected as the chairman of the People's Consultative Assembly (MPR) and speaker of the concurrently speaker of the People's Representative Council (DPR).

== Retired life and death ==
Amir Machmud served as the Chairman of MPR/Head of DPR until 1987. This was to be his last post before retirement. He died on 21 April 1995 leaving a wife, two children and ten grandchildren.

== Notes ==
Political offices
Preceded by Daryatmo	Speaker of the People's Consultative Assembly; Speaker of the House of Representatives; 1982–1987	Succeeded by Kharis Suhud
