= Moestopo =

Indonesian general

- Moestopo in the 1940s

Personal details
- Born: 13 July 1913 Kediri, Dutch East Indies
- Died: 29 September 1986 (aged 73) Bandung, Indonesia
- Occupation: Dentist, founder of Moestopo University
- Awards: National Hero of Indonesia

Military service
- Allegiance: Indonesia
- Branch/service: People's Security Forces
- Years of service: 1943–1949
- Rank: Major General
- Battles/wars: Indonesian National Revolution; Battle of Surabaya

Major General Moestopo (13 July 1913 – 29 September 1986) was an Indonesian military officer, revolutionary and educator, and military figure in the Indonesian War of Independence.

Born in Kediri, East Java, Moestopo moved to Surabaya to attend the School of Dentistry there. His work as a dentist was interrupted in 1942 when the Japanese occupied Indonesia and Moestopo was arrested by the Kempeitai for looking suspicious. Upon his release, he became a dentist for the Japanese but eventually decided to train as an army officer. After graduating with honours, Moestopo was given command of PETA (Pembela Tanah Air) troops in Sidoarjo; he was later promoted to commander of the troops in Gresik.

While in Surabaya, during the Indonesian National Revolution, Moestopo conducted negotiations with British expeditionary forces led by Brigadier Aubertin Walter Sothern Mallaby. When relations broke down and President Sukarno was called to Surabaya to mend them, Moestopo was offered a job as an adviser but declined. During the war he held several other positions, including leading a squadron of regular soldiers, pickpockets, and prostitutes to spread confusion in the ranks of the enemy Dutch forces. After the war, Moestopo continued to work as a dentist, and in 1961 he founded Moestopo University. He died in Bandung in 1986 and was posthumously declared a National Hero of Indonesia on 10 November 2007.

== Early life and dentistry ==
Moestopo was born in Ngadiluwih, Kediri, East Java, Dutch East Indies on 13 June 1913. He was the sixth of eight children born to Raden Koesoemowinoto. After his primary schooling, Moestopo went to the School of Dentistry (STOVIT) in Surabaya. His education initially paid for by his elder siblings, Moestopo later took to selling rice to earn his way through university. Taking further education in the field in Surabaya and Yogyakarta, in 1937 he became an assistant orthodontist in Surabaya. From 1941 to 1942, he became the assistant director of STOVIT.

== Japanese occupation ==
After the Japanese occupied Indonesia in 1942 Moestopo was arrested by the Kempeitai as a suspected Indo (a person of mixed European and Indonesian heritage); this suspicion was based on Moestopo's large frame. However, he was soon released and, after serving as an army dentist for the Japanese, received military training in Bogor. Along with future generals Sudirman and Gatot Soebroto, he finished at the top of his class. During his training he wrote a paper on the military applications of bamboo spears tipped with horse feces, for which he received high marks.

Upon graduation, Moestopo was given the command of troops command of PETA troops in Sidoarjo. Soon afterwards, he was promoted to commander of the native forces protecting Gresik and Surabaya; he was one of only five Indonesians to receive such a promotion. While in Surabaya, he worked at relieving the rising unemployment rate by establishing workshops to produce soap and toothbrushes and reportedly pushed for his men to put horse manure on their bamboo spears to spread tetanus and eat cats for better night vision – the remains of eaten cats are said to have been buried in their own heroes' cemetery.

== Indonesian National Revolution ==
After the end of World War II, on 17 August 1945 Indonesia proclaimed its independence; Moestopo maintained control of the nascent military forces in Surabaya and forcibly disarmed the Japanese forces while armed with bamboo spears. In October of that year he arrested interim Minister of Defence Sulyoadikusumo who went to Surabaya on a visit, and Moestopo claimed his office although he would later relent. On 25 October of that year, the 49th Indian Infantry Brigade under the command of Brigadier general Aubertin Walter Sothern Mallaby, arrived in the city; Mallaby sent his intelligence officer Captain Macdonald to meet with Moestopo. According to Macdonald's report, Moestopo was opposed to the arrival of British forces.

=== Battle of Surabaya ===
When the British then went to Governor of East Java, Ario Soerjo, seeking a more friendly reception, Moestopo reportedly wanted the envoys, Macdonald and a naval officer, shot upon arrival. Soeryo, however, proved amenable to the British declaration that they came in peace; he only refused to meet Mallaby on HMS Waveney after Moestopo rebuffed British requests that he come aboard to negotiate. The British landed in Surabaya that afternoon, after which Moestopo met with Colonel Pugh; Pugh emphasized that the British were not intending to reinstate Dutch rule, and Moestopo agreed to meet with Mallaby the following morning.

At the meeting with Mallaby, Moestopo reluctantly agreed to disarm the Indonesian forces in the city. However, relations soured almost immediately. That afternoon, Moestopo was possible pressured to assist Mallaby in rescuing Dutch captain Huijer, and on 27 October a Douglas C-47 Skytrain from the capital in Batavia (modern day Jakarta) dropped a series of pamphlets signed by General Douglas Hawthorn demanding that the Indonesians surrender their weapons within 48 hours or be treated as hostiles. As this was against his agreement with Mallaby, Moestopo and his allies took offense to the list of demands and refused to entertain British diplomatic overtures.

The Battle of Surabaya begin, fighting between the forces took place from 28 to 30 October after Moestopo told his troops that the British would attempt to forcibly disarm them; intense fighting broke out after Mallaby's death in confused circumstances. When the British requested President Sukarno to intervene, the president took Moestopo as an adviser and told the Indonesian forces to stop fighting. Moestopo, unwilling to relinquish his command, chose to go to his headquarter instead at Gresik. Thus, when the Battle of Surabaya continued, Moestopo was no longer in command.

=== Terate Troops ===
By February 1946, when Dutch troops had already returned to Java, he went to Yogyakarta to work as a military educator, teaching for a time at the military academy there. In mid-1946 Moestopo was sent to Subang, where he led the Terate Troops. Aside from regular military forces, members of the Terate Troops under Moestopo's commanded also included legions of pickpockets and prostitutes who were tasked with spreading confusion in and procuring supplies from behind the Dutch lines. Moestopo also served as the political educator for military forces in Subang. In May 1947, after serving a period as head of the Struggle Bureau in Jakarta, he was transferred to East Java after being wounded in a skirmish with Dutch forces.

== Post-Independence ==
After the war, Moestopo moved to Jakarta, where he took office as Section Head for Jaw Surgery at the Army Hospital (now Gatot Subroto Military Hospital). In 1952, Moestopo began training other dentists in his off time from his home, giving basic training in hygiene, nutrition, and anatomy. Meanwhile, he came under consideration for position of Minister of Defence for the Wilopo Cabinet, but was ultimately not chosen; instead, he led a series of demonstrations against the parliamentary system.

Moestopo formalized his home dentistry course in 1957, and in 1958 – after training in the United States – he established the Dr. Moestopo Dental College, which he continued to develop it until it became a university on 15 February 1961. That same year, he received his doctorate from the University of Indonesia.

== Death ==
Moestopo died on 29 September 1986 and was buried in Cikutra Cemetery, Bandung.

== Accolades ==
On 9 November 2007, President Susilo Bambang Yudhoyono gave Moestopo the title National Hero of Indonesia; Moestopo received the title along with Adnan Kapau Gani, Ida Anak Agung Gde Agung, and Ignatius Slamet Riyadi based on Presidential Decree Number 66 / TK of 2007. That same year he was awarded the Bintang Mahaputera Adipradana.
