= Defenders of the Homeland =

Indonesian volunteer army created by the Empire of Japan during World War II

- 郷土防衛義勇軍 (Tentara Sukarela) Pembela Tanah Air
- Colour used by PETA battalions
- Active: 3 October 1943 – 15 August 1945
- Country: Dutch East Indies and British Malaya
- Allegiance: (Empire of Japan) Imperial Japanese Army
- Type: Infantry
- Role: Defending the Japanese-occupied Dutch East Indies and British Malaya from Allied invasion
- Size: 66 Battalions in Java, 3 Battalions in Bali, c. 20,000 men in Sumatra, c. 2,000 men in Malaya
- Nickname: PETA
- Colours: Purple, Green, Red, & White
- March: "Mars Tentara Pembela"
- Engagements: 1945 PETA revolt in Blitar

The Defenders of the Homeland (Japanese: 郷土防衛義勇軍, romanized: Kyōdo Bōei Giyūgun; Indonesian: (Tentara Sukarela) Pembela Tanah Air, PETA) was a volunteer army established on 3 October 1943 in the Dutch East Indies (present-day Indonesia) by the occupying Japanese. The Japanese intended PETA to assist their forces in opposing a possible invasion by the Allies. By the end of World War II, there were a total of 69 battalions (daidan) in Java, Madura, and Bali (around 37,000 men) and Sumatra (approximately 20,000 men). On 17 August 1945, the day after the Proclamation of Indonesian Independence, the Japanese ordered the PETA daidan to surrender and hand over their weapons, which most of them did. Indonesia's inaugural President, Sukarno, supported the dissolution rather than turning the organisation into a national army as he feared allegations of collaboration had he allowed a Japanese-created militia to continue to exist.

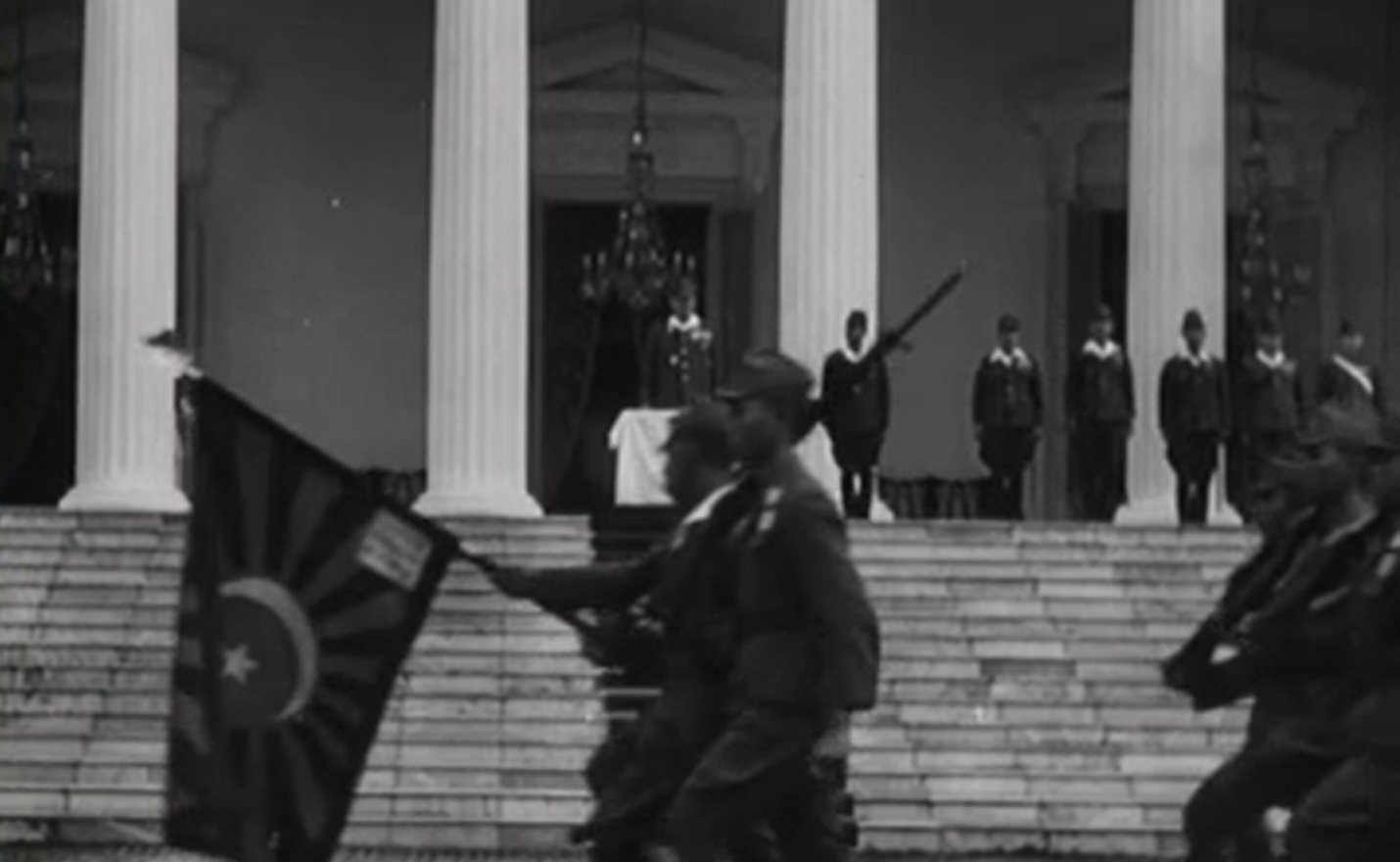
PETA soldiers marching with their flag, 1944

During the Indonesian War of Independence, former PETA officers and troops, such as Suharto and Sudirman, formed the core of the fledgling Indonesian National Armed Forces.

== PETA units in Java and Bali ==
Battalion	Battalion commander (daidancho)	Notes	Officers of other ranks (chūdanchō, shōdanchó)
I Labuan, Banten	Tubagus Ahmad Chatib al-Bantani	Muslim cleric	Suhadisastra
II Malingping, Banten	E. Ojong Temaja	Muslim cleric	M.B. Sutman
III Serang, Banten	Syam'un	Muslim cleric	Zainul Falah
IV Pandeglang, Banten	Uding Sujatmadja		Mustaram
I Harmoni, Djakarta	Kasman Singodimedjo	Graduate of RHS; Former leader of JIB and MIAI	Moeffreni Moe'min; Latief Hendraningrat
II Purwakarta, Djakarta	Surjodipuro		Mursid
I Djampang Kulon, Bogor	Abdullah bin Nuh	Muslim cleric	Husen Aleksah
II Pelabuan Ratu, Bogor	M. Basuni	Muslim cleric	Mulja
III Sukabumi, Bogor	Kafrawi		Machmud
IV Tjibeber, Tjiandjur, Bogor	R. Gunawan Resmiputro		Ishak Djuarsa
I Tasikmalaja, Priangan	K.H. Sutalaksana	Muslim cleric	Abdullah Saleh
II Pangandaran, Priangan	K.H. Pardjaman	Muslim cleric	K. Hamid
III Bandung, Priangan	Iljas Sasmita		Permana; Umar Wirahadikusumah
IV Tjimahi, Priangan	Arudji Kartawinata	Graduate of MULO; Former executive of PSII	Soeparjadi; Poniman; Supardi (Indonesia)
V Garut, Priangan	R. Sofjan Iskandar		Katamsi Sutisna
I Tjirebon	Abdulgani Surjokusumo		Rukman
II Madjalengka, Tjirebon	R. Zaenal Asikin Judibrata		Suarman
I Pekalongan	Iskandar Idris	Muslim cleric	Ajub
II Tegal, Pekalongan	K.H. Durjatman	Muslim cleric	Sumardjono
I Tjilatjap, Banjumas	R. Sutirto		R. Hartojo
II Sumpiuh, Banjumas	Susalit Joyoadiningrat		Zaelan Asikin
III Kroja, Banjumas	Sudirman	Graduate of Muhammadiyah teachers' training school Muhammadiyah schoolteacher	Supardjo Rustam
IV Banjumas	Isdiman Suryokusumo; Gatot Subroto		Sarengat
I Gombong, Kedu	Abdul Kadir (born 1906); Bambang Sugeng		R. Sutrisno
II Magelang, Kedu	Muhammad Susman		Sugiardjo; Supangkat
III Gombong, Kedu	Djoko Kusumo		Slamet; Ahmad Yani; Sarwo Edhie Wibowo
IV Purworedjo, Kedu	Mukahar Ronohadikusumo		Tjiptoroso
I Mrican, Semarang	R. Usman; Sutrisno Sudomo		Sujadi
II Weleri, Kendal, Semarang	R. Sudijono Taruno Kusumo		Suparman Sumahamidjaja
I Pati	Kusmoro Hadidewo		
II Rembang, Pati	Holan Iskandar		Sukardi
III Djepara, Pati	Prawiro Atmodjo		Sukardji
I Wates, Jogjakarta	D. Martojomeno		Sudjiono
II Bantul, Jogjakarta	Mohammed Saleh	Graduate of higher teachers' training school Muhammadiyah schoolteacher	Sugiono
III Pingit, Jogjakarta	Sundjojo Purbokusumo		Daryatmo; Suharto
IV Wonosari, Jogjakarta	Muridan Noto		Nudi
I Manahan, Surakarta	R.M. Muljadi Djojomartono	Muslim cleric	Suprapto Sukawati; Djatikoesoemo
II Wonogiri, Surakarta	K.H. Idris	Muslim cleric	Budiman
I Babat, Bodjonegoro	K.H. Masjkur; Sudirman	Muslim cleric	Utojo Utomo
II Bodjonegoro	Masri		R. Rachmat
III Tuban-Bodjonegoro	Sumadi Sastroatmodjo		Sumardjo
I Madiun	Agus Tojib		Mumardjo
II Patjitan, Madiun	Akub Gulangge		R. Subagijo
III Ponorogo, Madiun	M. Sudjono		Sudijat
I Tulungagung, Kediri	Sudiro		Tulus
II Blitar, Kediri	Surachmad		Sukandar; Suprijadi
III Kediri	A. Judodiprodjo; Sujoto Djojopurnomo		Mashudi Sudjono
I Gunung Sari, Surabaja	Mustopo	Graduate of STOVIT; Dentist	Masduki Abudardja
II Sidoardjo, Surabaja	R. Muhammad Mangundiprodjo		Bambang Juwono
III Modjokerto, Surabaja	Katamhadi		Usman
IV Gresik, Surabaja	K.H. Cholik Hasjim	Muslim cleric	Jondat Modjo
I Gondanglegi, Malang	K. Iskandar Sulaeman	Muslim cleric	Sumarto
II Lumadjang, Malang	M. Sujo Adikusumo		S. Hardjo Hudojo
III Pasuruan, Malang	Arsjid Kromodihardjo		Slamet
IV Malang	Imam Sudja'i		Sukardani
V Probolinggo, Malang	Sudarsono		Sumitro
I Kentjong, Djember, Besuki	Suwito; Sudiro		Sukarto
II Bondowoso, Besuki	K.H. Tahirruddin Tjokro Atmodjo	Muslim cleric	Rosadi
III Bentjuluk, Banjuwangi, Besuki	Sukotjo		Imam Sukarto
IV Rambipundji, Djember-Besuki	Surodjo; Astiklah		Subandi
V Sukowidi, Banjuwangi, Besuki	R. Usman Sumodinoto		Sudarmin
I Pamekasan, Madura	K.H. R. Amin Dja'far	Muslim cleric	R. Mohammad Saleh
II Bangkalan, Madura	Ruslan Tjakraningrat		Hafiludin
III Batang-batang, Madura	Abdul Madjid		Achmad Basuni
IV Ambunten, Sumenep, Madura	Abdul Hamid Mudhari	Muslim cleric	Suroso
V Ketapang, Madura	Trunodjojo		Mochamad Sabirin
I Negara, Bali	I Made Putu		I Wayan Mudana
II Tabanan, Bali	I Gusti Ngurah Gede Pugeng		Ida Bagus Tongka
III Klungkung, Bali	Anak Agung Made Agung		I Made Geria

== Malayan Volunteer Army ==
Flag of the Malayan Volunteer Army

By April 1944, a Malayan Defenders of the Homeland Association (Ikatan Pembela Tanah Ayer Malaya), formally the Malayan Volunteer Army (Japanese: マライ義勇軍, romanized: Marai Giyūgun), was stationed in Johor Bahru in Japanese-occupied Malaya. It was staffed by some 2,000 Malays and Indians and modeled on the organization of the Indonesian PETA, intending to create a local pro-Japanese reserve force for the defense of Malaya and Singapore. It was reinforced by the part-time Malayan Volunteer Corps (Japanese: マライ義勇隊, romanized: Marai Giyūtai) and recruitment of local Heiho started in January 1945.

The commander of the Malayan PETA was Ibrahim Yaacob, who had been the founder and leader of the pro-independence Young Malays Union, which the Japanese had shut down over its ties to the Communist Party of Malaya (CPM) and Malayan Peoples' Anti-Japanese Army. In his post-war autobiography, Yaacob claimed to have secretly continued communications with the CPM during the Japanese occupation.

After the surrender of Japan on 15 August 1945, the Malayan Volunteer Army began marching towards Kuala Lumpur before disbanding in northern Johor.

== Notable members ==
- R. Bintoro
- Daryatmo
- Djatikoesoemo
- Muljadi Djojomartono
- Djamin Ginting
- Daan Jahja
- Arudji Kartawinata
- Soetardjo Kartohadikusumo
- Zulkifli Lubis
- Amir Machmud
- Gatot Mangkoepradja
- Muhammad Mangundiprojo
- Masjkur
- Moestopo
- Daan Mogot
- Imam Munandar
- Maraden Panggabean
- Basuki Rahmat
- Soekotjo Sastrodinoto
- Kasman Singodimedjo
- Gatot Soebroto
- Bambang Soegeng
- Widjojo Soejono
- G. M. Soeparmin
- Soetran
- Sudirman
- Suharto
- Sumitro
- Supriyadi
- Syam'un
- Tjokropranolo
- Wahono
- Sarwo Edhie Wibowo
- Umar Wirahadikusumah
- Ibrahim Yaacob
- Ahmad Yani

== See also ==
- Collaboration with the Empire of Japan
- Japanese occupation of the Dutch East Indies
- 1945 PETA revolt in Blitar
- Pembela Tanah Air Museum
