= Bulu prison massacre =

1945 Indonesian killing of Japanese WWII POWs

The Bulu prison massacre was an incident that took place in Bulu prison, Semarang, Central Java, occurring late in World War II in which over one hundred Japanese POWs were killed by Indonesian forces.

== Background ==
In 1942, the Japanese invaded the Dutch East Indies, occupying it for the next three and a half years. In September 1944, with the war going badly, the Japanese promised independence, but following the bombings of Hiroshima and Nagasaki, the Japanese surrendered. Under the terms of the surrender, the Japanese forces still in the archipelago were responsible for maintaining order prior to the arrival of Allied forces under British Admiral Earl Louis Mountbatten, the Supreme Allied Commander, South East Asia Command.

Two days after the surrender, on 17 August 1945, Indonesian nationalist leader Sukarno proclaimed independence for Indonesia. The Allies learned of this three weeks later from the commander of the Japanese forces, and because there were still at least 70,000 Allied prisoners of war in Indonesia, Recovery of Allied Prisoners of War and Internees (RAPWI) was sent on a mission by the Allies to "try to contact the responsible Japanese authorities, alleviate conditions in the prison camps and arrange the evacuation of the prisoners and internees."

However, Indonesian nationalists, known as pemuda (youths), demanded the Japanese hand over all arms and ammunition. RAPWI "strongly objected to such actions and demanded that the Japanese continue to protect the [Allied POW] camps". However, many officers, including Major General Nakamura Junji, ignored RAPWI's request and turned over their weapons. Not all Japanese officers, such as Major Kido Shinichirou, agreed to surrender their weapons. Instead, on 15 October, he ordered his men to take control of the city of Semarang.

== Massacre ==
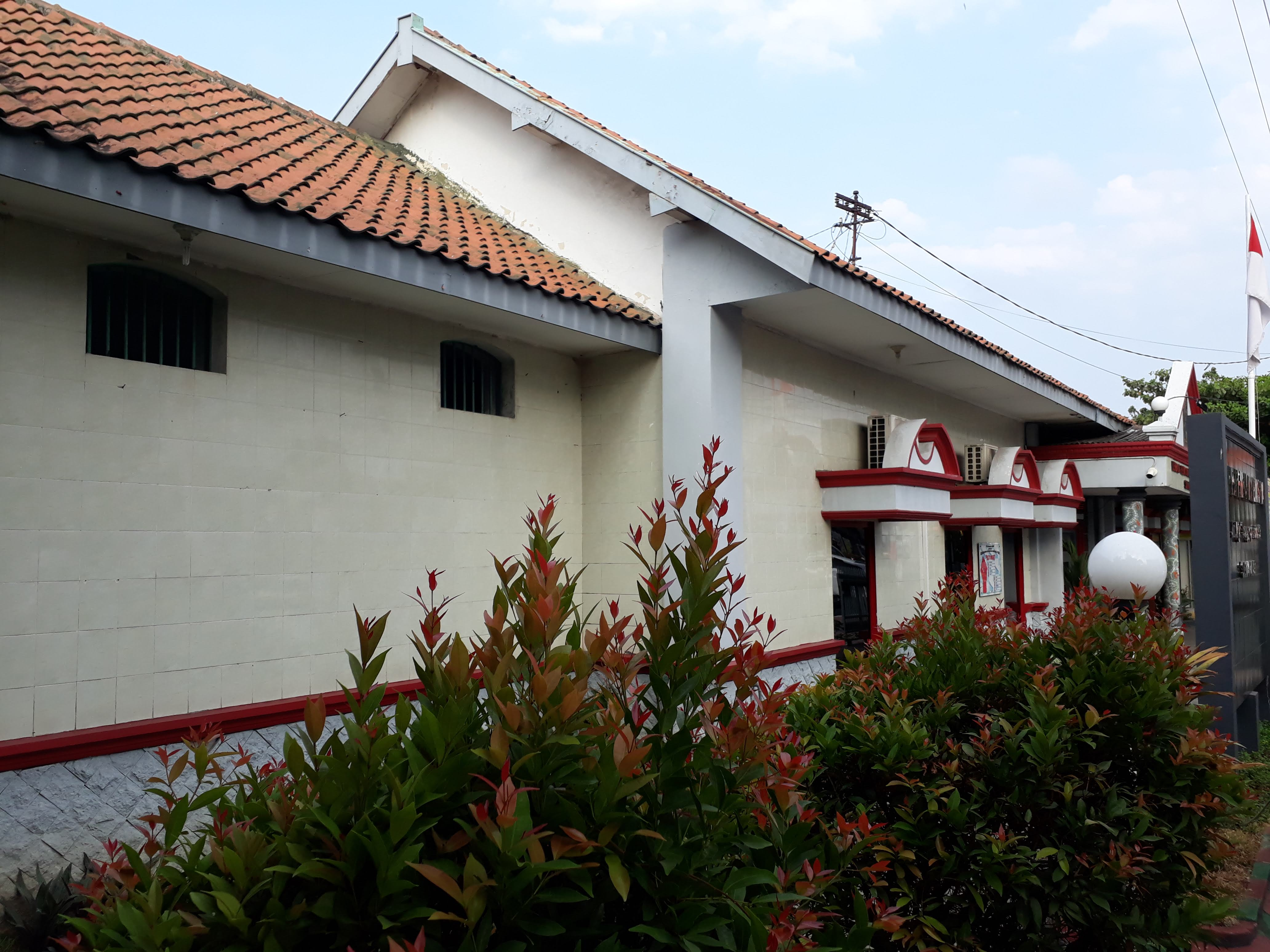
The former Bulu Prison, now Semarang Women's Penitentiary

In response to Major Shinichiro’s military actions, Indonesian nationalists locked around 80 Japanese Army workers in a small cell in Bulu Jail without food or water. A day later, those still alive were shot dead, along with another 130 Japanese detained at the same prison, whose bodies were mutilated. Some dying prisoners wrote final messages on the cell walls in their own blood.

When the Japanese forces reached and took control of the prison and discovered the massacre, they were infuriated and began to kill Indonesians in revenge. They were joined in this by Japanese civilians, who were given weapons seized from the Indonesians. All together, the Japanese killed over 2,000 Indonesians as revenge for the Bulu Prison Massacre, while a further 500 Indonesians also died. The killing stopped when British Gurkha troops arrived on 19 October, and after an initial misunderstanding and exchange of fire, the Japanese agreed to cooperate with them.
