= Banceuy Prison =

Prison in Bandung, West Java, Indonesia

Coordinates: 6.9147°S 107.6100°E

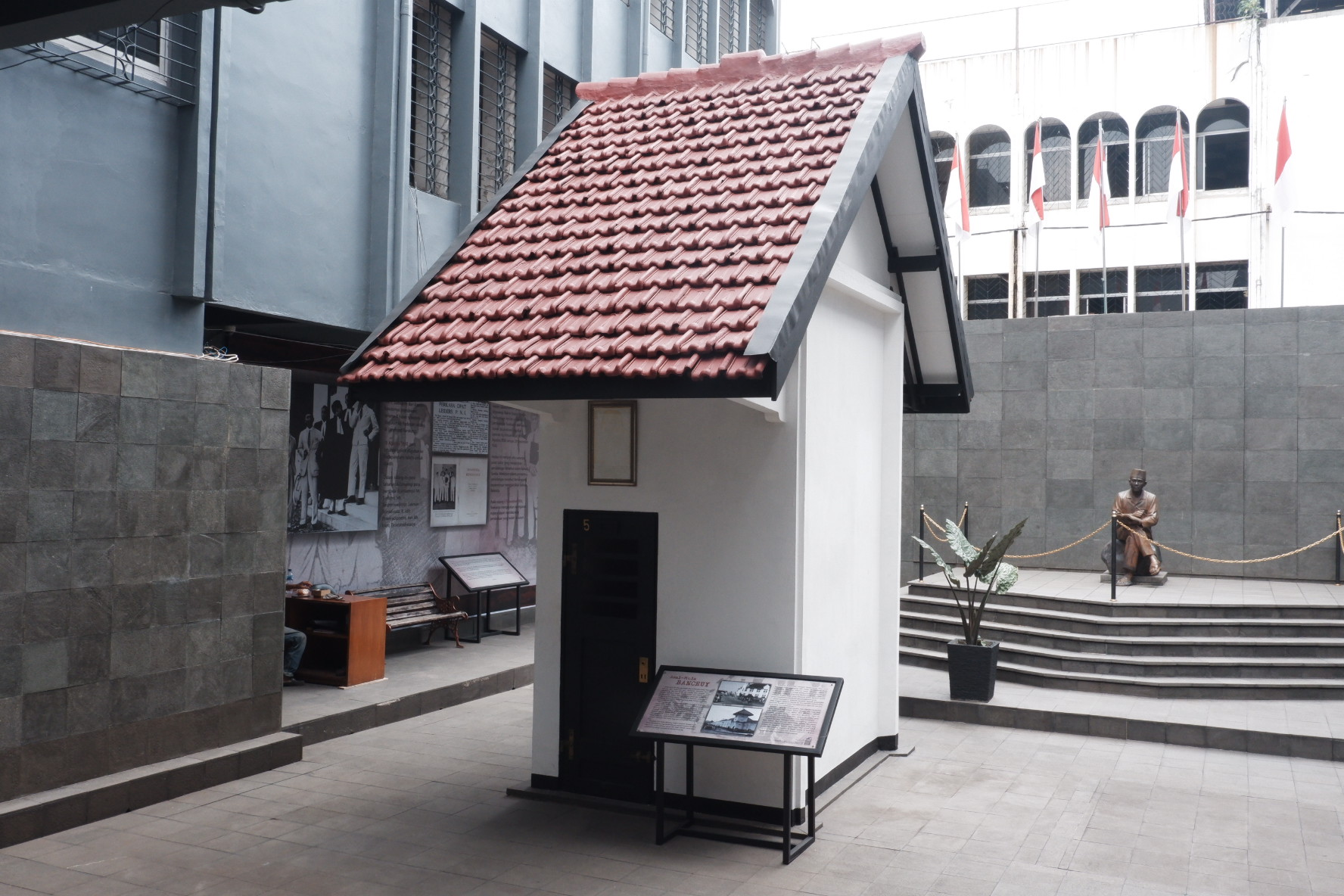
Banceuy Prison gatehouse

Banceuy Prison (Indonesian: Penjara Banceuy) was a prison located in Bandung, West Java, Indonesia.

Banceuy Prison was built in 1877 by the Dutch colonial government. It is located in Banceuy Street, 500 meters to the west of the Merdeka Building-Asian-African Conference Museum complex.

Banecuy Prison was a prison that held President Surkano (Soekarno in Dutch) in December 1930.
