= Daryatmo =

Indonesian military figure

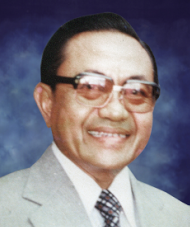
- Official portrait, 1978

5th Speaker of the People's Consultative Assembly
- In office 23 March 1978 – 30 September 1982
- Preceded by: Adam Malik
- Succeeded by: Amir Machmud

8th Speaker of the House of Representatives
- In office 23 March 1978 – 30 September 1982
- Preceded by: Adam Malik
- Succeeded by: Amir Machmud

7th Commander of Kodam I/Bukit Barisan
- In office 1 August 1963 – 29 October 1965
- President: Suharto
- Preceded by: Colonel A. Thalib
- Succeeded by: Brig. Gen. Sobiran

Personal details
- Born: 18 June 1925 Surakarta, Midden-Java, Dutch East Indies
- Died: 6 December 1992 (aged 67) Jakarta, Indonesia
- Resting place: Kalibata Heroes' Cemetery
- Education: Indonesian Army Command and General Staff College; United States Army Command and General Staff College
- Occupation: Politician; army officer

Military service
- Allegiance: Indonesia
- Branch/service: Indonesian Army
- Years of service: 1945–1980
- Rank: General
- Unit: Infantry
- Commands: Kodam I/Bukit Barisan
- Service no.: 10903

Daryatmo, also spelled Darjatmo (18 June 1925 – 6 December 1992) was an Indonesian military figure and served as Speaker of the People's Representative Council and Speaker of the People's Consultative Assembly from 1978–1982.

Daryatmo received military education at Army Command and Staff College, and then further military education abroad at the Command and General Staff College, Fort Leavenworth, United States, and education at Suslapa, Seskoad in Bandung.

As Chief of Staff for Operations on 17 August, Daryatmo led the suppression of the PRRI rebellion in Sumatra under General Ahmad Yani. In 1978, Daryatmo became Speaker of the People's Representative Council and People's Consultative Assembly replacing Adam Malik, who became Vice President. He was the first ABRI member to serve as Speaker of the DPR/MPR. Together with Prof. Sarbini Sumawinata, Daryatmo also led an Army seminar in Bandung, which gave birth to the Tri Ubaya Sakti Army Doctrine.

The various military positions he had held were People's Security Agency Company Commander, Head of the People's Security Agency Strategy, Commander of Battalion 4 Regiment 22, Commander of Battalion 7 Regiment 21 in Yogyakarta, Chief of Staff Regiment Intantri/Subter 12, Commander of Infantry Regiment/Subter 13 in TT-IV, Chief of Staff Operations Staff August 17 in Sumatra (1958–1959), Dir-Hub TNI AD (1959–1963), Kodam I/Bukit Barisan (1963–1965), 6th Assistant to the Menpangad and Special Deputy to the Menpangad (1965–1968), Kaskar Hankam (1969). Daryatmo entered a period of preparation for retirement in 1980 with the rank of full general. He died in Jakarta on 6 December 1992, at the age of 67 and was buried in the Kalibata Heroes' Cemetery (TMPNU), South Jakarta.

Political offices
Preceded by Adam Malik	Speaker of the People's Consultative Assembly; Speaker of the House of Representatives; 1978–1982	Succeeded by Amir Machmud
