= Gatot Soebroto =

Indonesian general (1907–1962)

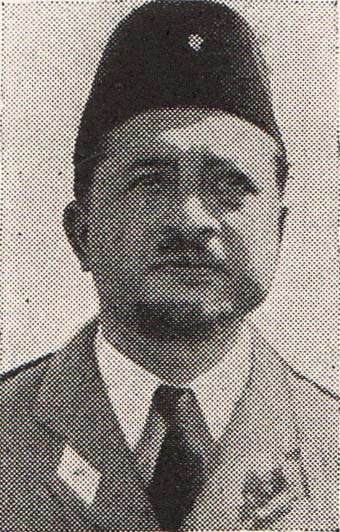
- Col Soebroto in 1950
- Born: 10 October 1907; Purwokerto, Dutch East Indies
- Died: 11 June 1962 (aged 54); Jakarta, Indonesia
- Burial place: Ungaran, Semarang Regency, Central Java, Indonesia
- Children: 7, including Bob Hasan (adopted)
- Military career
- Allegiance: Dutch East Indies (1923–1942); Empire of Japan (1943–1945); Indonesia (1945–1962)
- Branch: Royal Netherlands Indies Army (KNIL); Defenders of the Homeland (PETA); Indonesian Army
- Service years: 1923–1942, 1943–1945, 1945–1962
- Conflicts: Indonesian National Revolution
- Awards: National Hero of Indonesia

Gatot Soebroto (Enhanced Spelling: Gatot Subroto, 10 October 1907 – 11 June 1962) was an Indonesian general who began his military career with the Royal Dutch East Indies Army (KNIL) and rose to be deputy Army chief-of-staff.

== Early life ==
Soebroto was born in Purwokerto, Central Java. He began his education at a Europeesche Lagere School, an elementary school for the children of Europeans, but was expelled for fighting with the Dutch children. He then moved to a Hollandsch-Inlandsche School for Indonesians. He did not continue his education after graduating from this elementary school but instead found a job. However, he was dissatisfied and decided on a military career.

== Pre-independence military career ==
In 1923, Gatot enrolled in a military school in Magelang. After graduating, he joined the Royal Dutch East Indies Army (KNIL) and rose to the rank of sergeant. In 1942, the Japanese invaded the Dutch East Indies, and Gatot joined the Pembela Tanah Air (PETA), a volunteer army set up by the Japanese in case of invasion by the Allies. He received training in Bogor, and was appointed commander of a company in Banyumas, then a battalion commander.

Gatot was one of the group of ex-KNIL NCOs, which included future president Soeharto and future army chief of staff Ahmad Yani who joined the BKR (People's Security Agency), the forerunner of the Indonesian Army as soon as it was set up after the Indonesian Declaration of Independence on 17 August 1945. On 5 October 1946, he was appointed commander of the II/Gunung Jati Division in Central Java. On 31 May 1948, he became commander of the Military Police and later that year Military Governor of the Surakarta-Semarang-Pati-Madiun region. He was involved in the suppression of the 1948 Madiun Revolt. In July 1949, he went to Yogyakarta shortly after Army commander Soedirman's return to the city, which at the time was the capital. There he was sick and had to be treated at the Panti Rapih Hospital.

On 3 August 1949, President Sukarno announced a ceasefire with the Dutch, and Nasution, commander of the Java Military District, decided a reorganization of divisions was needed to face the threat of a possible third Dutch "police action". Central Java's III and IV divisions were merged, and Gatot Soebroto was appointed commander, although he was still in hospital then. He was officially inaugurated on 20 November as commander of the renamed III/Diponegoro Division, which became the IV/Diponegoro Military Region in December. In this capacity, he warned one of his brigade commanders, Suharto, about establishing transport enterprise using Army vehicles, which the future president had set up to provide jobs for veterans.

In March 1952, Gatot moved to Makassar to take over command of the VII/Wirabuana Military Region, which covered all of Indonesia east of Java and Kalimantan. However, on 16 November he was arrested and displaced by his chief of staff, Lt. Col. J. F. Warouw. This was one of a series of small-scale coups against officers blamed for their involvement in the 17 October 1952 incident where troops demonstrated in front of the Presidential Palace in Jakarta calling for the dissolution of the legislature. Although Gatot supported the demonstration, he was not present in Jakarta at the time. He was subsequently either placed on non-active status as a result of the incident or resigned from the military.

== Political career ==
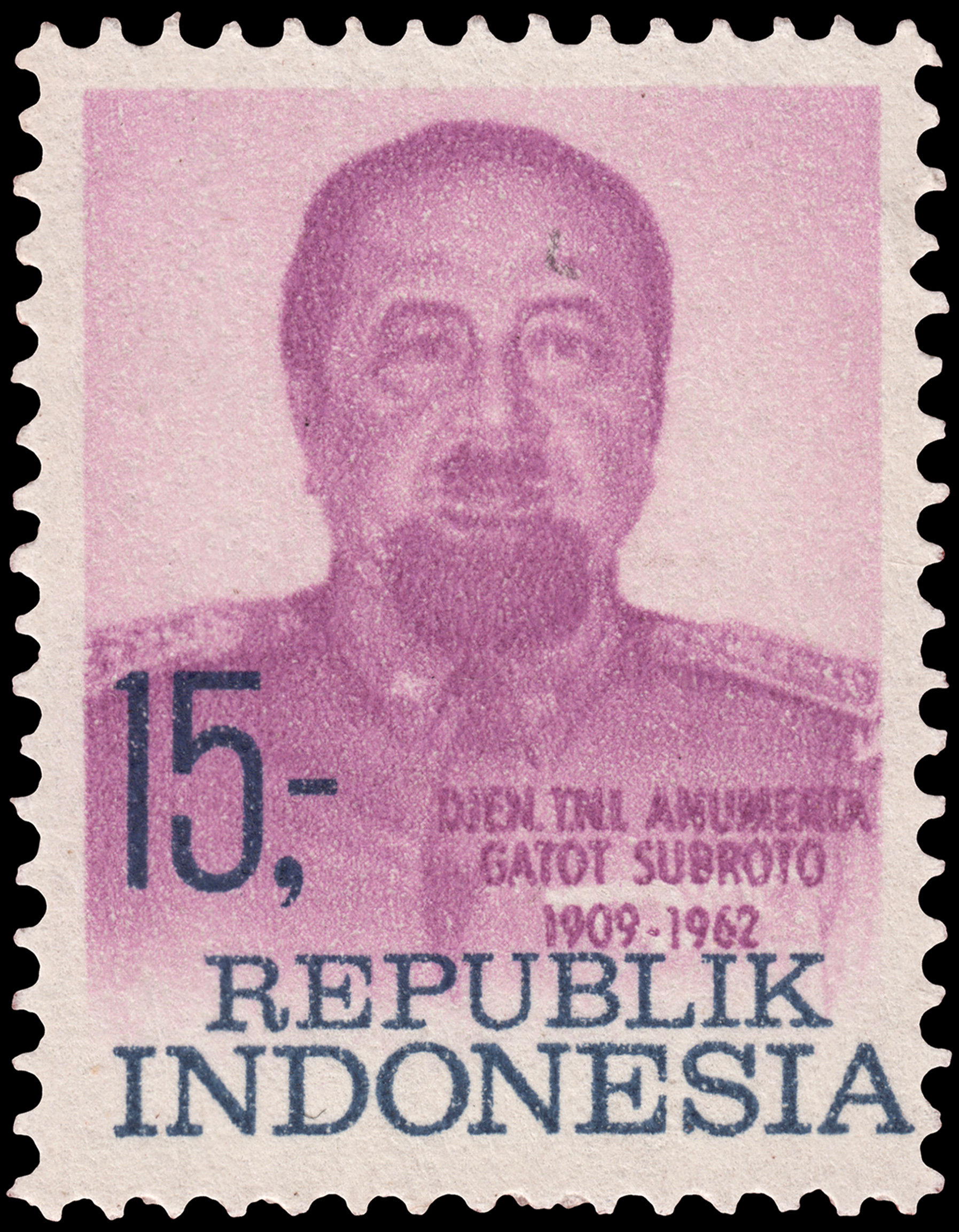
Soebroto on a 1969 stamp

On 20 May 1953, he attended a meeting led by Nasution (also inactive) in Tugu, West Java at which it was decided to establish a political party to "fight for the return to the spirit of the 1945 Constitution. The party was called the League of Supporters of Indonesian Independence (IPKI). The party won four seats in the 1955 election, and Gatot Soebroto became a member of the Indonesian legislature representing Central Java.

== Return to the military ==
Soon after the elections, the cabinet and the Army began the process of appointing an Army chief of staff to replace the acting head Colonel Lubis, who had not officially been installed. Gatot Soebroto emerged as a "compromise candidate", but turned down the job as he was worried about being manipulated by other officers. He told the cabinet that if they wanted a high-quality officer, they should recall Nasution to the post. Nasution was officially re-appointed on 7 November 1955. The following year, Gatot Soebroto was appointed deputy chief-of-staff, a position he held until his death.

In 1959, together with Nasution, he called a special meeting of the major political parties at the time to persuade them to support the proposal to return to the 1945 Constitution, which had been abrogated in favor of the Provisional Constitution of 1950 nine years before. All parties eventually agreed, and on 5 October 1959, the 1945 Constitution was reimposed by presidential decree.

Later that year, Nasution and Gatot Soebroto decided against taking further action against Soeharto after his dismissal from the command of the Diponegoro Division following revelations of involvement in smuggling.

Gatot Soebroto died suddenly in Jakarta on 11 June 1962 and was buried in a Buddhist funeral ceremony in the village of Kalirejo Ungaran near Semarang. A week later, he was declared a National Hero of Indonesia via Presidential Decision No.222/1962.
