= Sudirman =

First commander-in-chief of the Indonesian armed forces

Grand General (Ret.); Raden; Sudirman
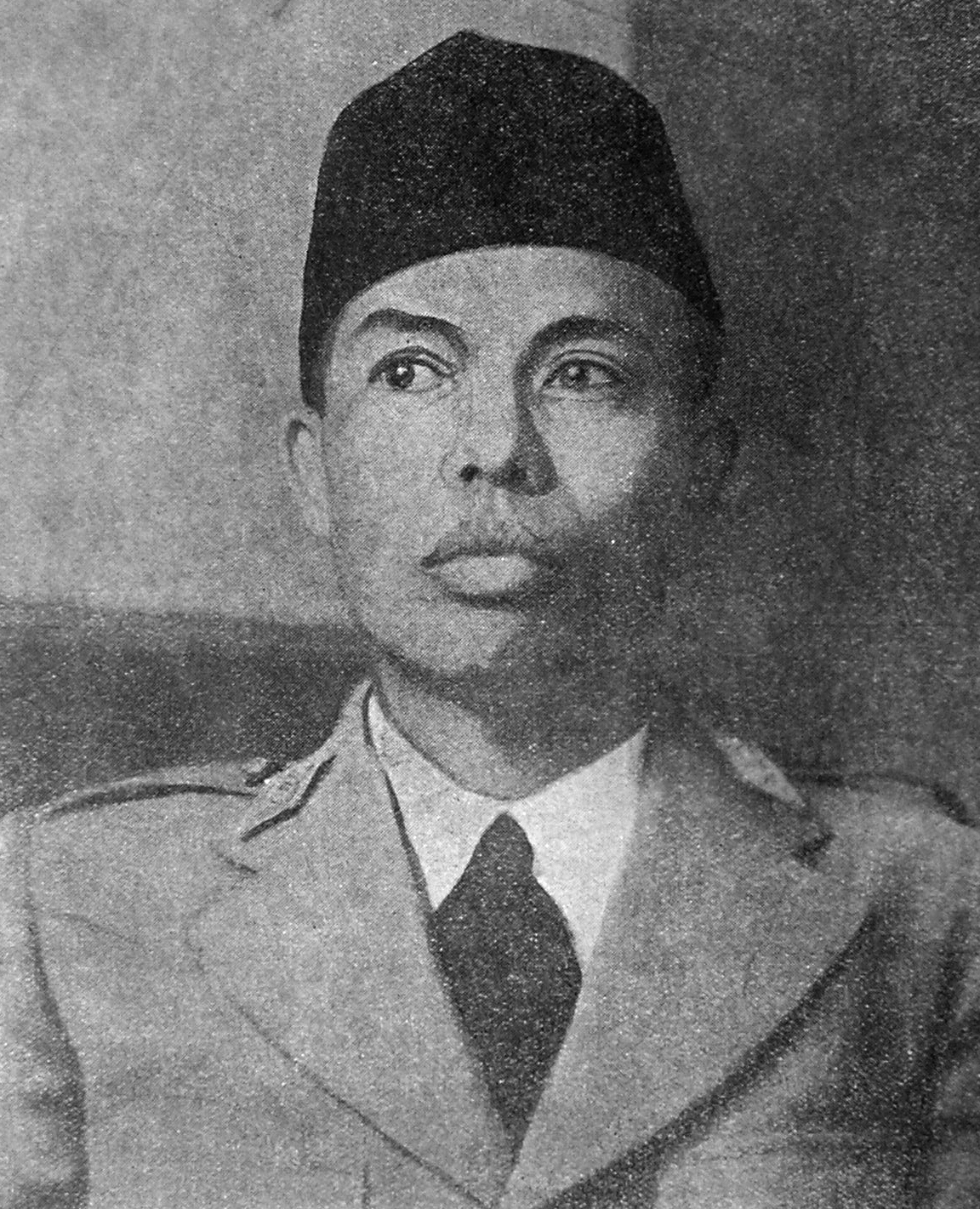
- Portrait of Sudirman, 1950

Commander of the Indonesian National Armed Forces
- In office 12 November 1945 – 29 January 1950
- President: Sukarno
- Preceded by: Supriyadi (never took office); Oerip Soemohardjo (acting)
- Succeeded by: Tahi Bonar Simatupang

Personal details
- Born: 24 January 1916 (Note: 24 January 1916 is the date recognised by the Indonesian government. The actual date may be different (Adi 2011, pp. 1–2). The historian Solichin Salam, for example, gives 7 February 1912 as Sudirman's date of birth, while fellow historian Yusuf Puar gives 7 September 1912 (quoted in Said 1991, p. 80).) Poerbalingga, Midden-Java, Dutch East Indies
- Died: 29 January 1950 (aged 34) Magelang, Indonesia
- Resting place: Semaki Heroes' Cemetery
- Spouse: Siti Alfiah (m. 1936)

Military service
- Allegiance: Empire of Japan; Indonesia
- Branch/service: Defenders of the Homeland; Indonesian Army
- Years of service: 1944–1950
- Rank: Lieutenant general (at death); General (posthumous); Grand general (1997); [[Colonel{at Battle of Ambara}
- Commands: PETA battalion, Banyumas; TKR Division V, Banyumas; Indonesian Armed Forces
- Battles/wars: World War II; Indonesian National Revolution; Battle of Ambarawa; Operation Product; Operation Kraai; General Offensive of 1 March 1949; Madiun Affair; Darul Islam rebellion
- Awards: National Hero of Indonesia (posthumous, 1964)

Sudirman (Old Spelling: Soedirman; 24 January 1916 – 29 January 1950) was an Indonesian military officer and revolutionary during the Indonesian National Revolution and the first commander of the Indonesian National Armed Forces.

Born in Purbalingga, Dutch East Indies, Sudirman moved to Cilacap in 1916 and was raised by his uncle. A diligent student at a Muhammadiyah-run school, he became respected within the community for his devotion to Islam. After dropping out of teacher's college, in 1936 he began working as a teacher, and later headmaster, at a Muhammadiyah-run elementary school. After the Japanese occupied the Indies in 1942, Sudirman continued to teach, before joining the Japanese-sponsored Defenders of the Homeland (PETA) as a battalion commander in Banyumas in 1944. In this position he put down a rebellion by his fellow soldiers, but was later interned in Bogor. After Indonesia proclaimed its independence on 17 August 1945, Sudirman led a break-out then went to Jakarta to meet President Sukarno. Tasked with overseeing the surrender of Japanese soldiers in Banyumas, he established a Division of the People's Safety Body there. On 12 November 1945, at an election to decide the military's commander-in-chief in Yogyakarta, Sudirman was chosen over Oerip Soemohardjo in a Close vote. While waiting to be confirmed, Sudirman ordered an assault on British and Dutch forces in Ambarawa. The ensuing battle and British withdrawal strengthened Sudirman's popular support, and he was ultimately confirmed on 18 December.

During the following three years Sudirman saw negotiations with the returning Dutch colonial forces fail, first after the Linggadjati Agreement – which Sudirman participated in drafting – and then the Renville Agreement; he was also faced with internal dissent, including a 1948 coup attempt. He later blamed these issues for his tuberculosis, which led to his right lung collapsing in November 1948. On 19 December 1948, several days after Sudirman's release from the hospital, the Dutch launched an assault on the capital. Sudirman and a small contingent escaped Dutch forces and left the city, making their headquarters at Sobo, near Mount Lawu. There Sudirman commanded military activities throughout Java, including a show of force in Yogyakarta on 1 March 1949. When the Dutch began withdrawing, in July 1949 Sudirman was recalled to Yogyakarta and forbidden to fight further. In late 1949 Sudirman's tuberculosis relapsed, and he retired to Magelang, where he died slightly more than a month after the Dutch recognised Indonesia's independence. He is buried at Semaki Heroes' Cemetery in Yogyakarta.

Sudirman's death was mourned throughout Indonesia, with flags flown at half-mast and thousands gathering to see his funeral convoy and procession. He continues to be highly respected in Indonesia. His guerrilla campaign has been credited with developing the army's esprit de corps, and the 100-kilometre (62 mi) long route he took must be followed by Indonesian cadets before graduation. Sudirman featured prominently on the 1968 series of rupiah banknotes, and has numerous streets, museums, and monuments named after him. On 10 December 1964, he was declared a National Hero of Indonesia.

== Early life ==
Sudirman was born to Karsid Kartawiraji (father) and Siyem while they lived with Siyem's sister Tarsem, one of three women married to the sub-district head Raden Cokrosunaryo, in Rembang, Bodas Karangjati, Purbalingga, Dutch East Indies. (Note: Karsid and his wife had moved to Rembang in 1915, after Karsid left his job on a Dutch-owned sugarcane plantation in Purbalingga (Sardiman 2008, p. 8); other sources suggest he was fired (Adi 2011, pp. 1–2). The journey was 145 kilometres (90 mi) by land, which Siyem made while pregnant (Sardiman 2008, p. 8).) (Note: Cokrosunaryo had no children (Imran 1980, p. 2).) According to the family's records, Sudirman – named by his uncle – was born on a pon Sunday in the month of Maulud in the Javanese calendar; the Indonesian government later established 24 January 1916 as Sudirman's birthday. As Cokrosunaryo was in a better financial situation, he adopted Sudirman and gave him the title Raden, reserved for Javanese nobility; however, Sudirman was not told that Cokrosunaryo was not his birth father until he was eighteen. When Cokrosunaryo retired from his position as chief in late 1916, Sudirman went with the family to Manggisan, Cilacap, where he was raised. In Cilacap Karsid and Siyem had another son, Muhammad Samingan. Karsid died when Sudirman was six, at which time Siyem left the boys with her brother-in-law and went back to her village at Parakan Onje, Ajibarang.

Sudirman was raised with stories of heroic deeds and taught the etiquette and ways of the priyayi, or noble caste, as well as the work ethic and simplicity of the wong cilik, or commoners. For his religious education, he studied Islam under Kyai Hajji Qahar with his brother; Sudirman was a religious child, and always prayed on time. He was soon entrusted with performing both the adhan and iqama, or calls to prayer. When he was seven years old, Sudirman was enrolled at a school for natives (hollandsch inlandsche school), where he was an average student. The family, although it had enough to live by, was not rich. During his tenure as sub-district head, Cokrosunaryo had not accumulated much wealth, and in Cilacap he became a distributor of Singer sewing machines.

In his fifth year of school, Sudirman asked to leave his studies, concerned with the ridicule he faced at the government-run school; (Note: Adi (2011, p. 3) writes that Sudirman was teased for his background, as most of his classmates would have been from old noble families or ones which had strong ties to the Dutch.) this request was at first refused, but Sudirman was transferred to a junior high school run by Taman Siswa in his seventh year of school. In his eighth year, Sudirman transferred to Wirotomo Junior High School (Note: Wirotomo literally translates as "main gate" (Sardiman 2008, p. 19).) after the Taman Siswa School was found to be unregistered and closed under the Wild School Ordinance. Many of Soedirman's teachers at Wirotomo were Indonesian nationalists, which influenced his views of the Dutch colonists. Sudirman studied diligently at school; his teacher Suwarjo Tirtosupono later recalled that Sudirman would already be studying second-term lessons while the class was still in term one. Although he performed poorly in Javanese calligraphy, Soedirman was strong in mathematics, science, and writing in both Dutch and Indonesian. Sudirman also became more religious under the guidance of his teacher Raden Mohamad Kholil; his classmates named him "hajji" because of his devotion to his prayers, and Sudirman took up preaching to other students. Aside from his studies and religious activities, Sudirman also served in the school's musical troupe and on the football team, on which he was a defender. Although Cokrosunaryo's death in 1934 left the family poor, Sudirman was allowed to continue his studies without paying until he graduated later that year; after his step-father's death, Sudirman also devoted more time to studying the Sunnah and prayer. By age 19, Sudirman had become a pupil teacher at Wirotomo.

=== Muhammadiyah ===
While at Wirotomo, Sudirman was a member of the Wirotomo Student Union, drama club, and band. He helped establish a branch of the Hizboel Wathan, an organisation similar to the Boy Scouts, which was run by the Islamic establishment Muhammadiyah. Sudirman became the leader of the Cilacap division after graduating from Wirotomo; he was tasked with deciding and planning his groups' activities. He emphasised the need for religious studies, insisting that the contingents from Cilacap attend Muhammadiyah conferences throughout Java. He taught the younger members (Note: Hizboel Wathan was open to children as young as seven (Sardiman 2008, p. 37).) about the history of Islam and the importance of morality, while with older members he enforced near-military discipline.

== Teaching ==
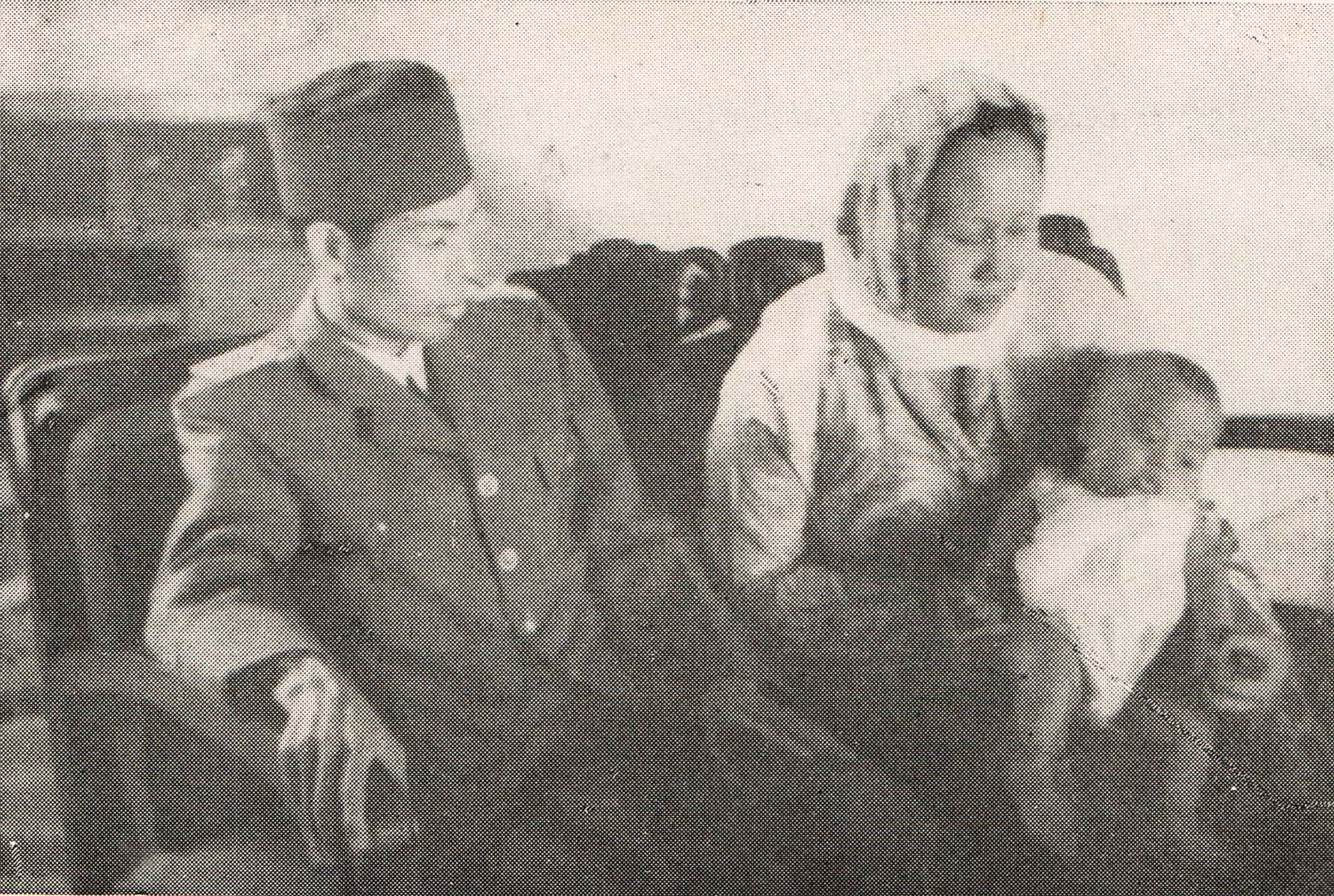
Sudirman and his wife Alfiah with their youngest son, 1949

After graduating from Wirotomo, Sudirman spent a year at a Muhammadiyah-run teacher's college in Surakarta, but later dropped out owing to a lack of funds. In 1936 he returned to Cilacap to teach at a Muhammadiyah-run elementary school, having been trained by his teachers at Wirotomo; that year he married Alfiah, a former schoolmate and the daughter of the rich batik merchant Raden Sastroatmojo. After the marriage Sudirman lived at his father-in-law's house in Cilacap so he could save money for his own home. The couple went on to have three sons, Ahmad Tidarwono, Muhammad Teguh Bambang Tjahjadi, and Taufik Effendi, and four daughters, Didi Praptiastuti, Didi Sutjiati, Didi Pudjiati, and Titi Wahjuti Satyaningrum.

As a teacher, Sudirman taught his students lessons on morality using examples from the lives of the prophets and traditional wayang stories. One of his students later recalled that Sudirman was an even-handed and patient teacher who would mix humour and nationalism in his lessons; this made him popular with the students. A hard-working teacher despite poor pay, within several years Sudirman had become headmaster despite not having a teacher's certificate. As a result, his monthly wages quadrupled from three gulden to twelve and a half. As headmaster, Sudirman worked on numerous administrative duties, including finding middle ground between feuding teachers. A coworker later recalled that Sudirman was a moderate, democratic leader. He was also active in fundraising, both for the needs of his school and the construction of others.

During this time Sudirman also continued to serve as a member of the Muhammadiyah Youth Group. Within the group he was known as a keen negotiator and mediator, working to resolve issues between members; he also preached at the local mosque. He was elected as Chair of the Banyumas District of the Muhammadiyah Youth Group at the end of 1937. In this role he enacted policies facilitating members' studies and activities, both religious and secular. He was later put in charge of Youth Group activities throughout Central Java and spent much of his free time travelling and preaching Islam, putting an emphasis on self-awareness. Alfiah was also active in Muhammadiyah-sponsored activities through the group's branch for women, Nasyiatul Aisyiyah.

== Japanese occupation ==
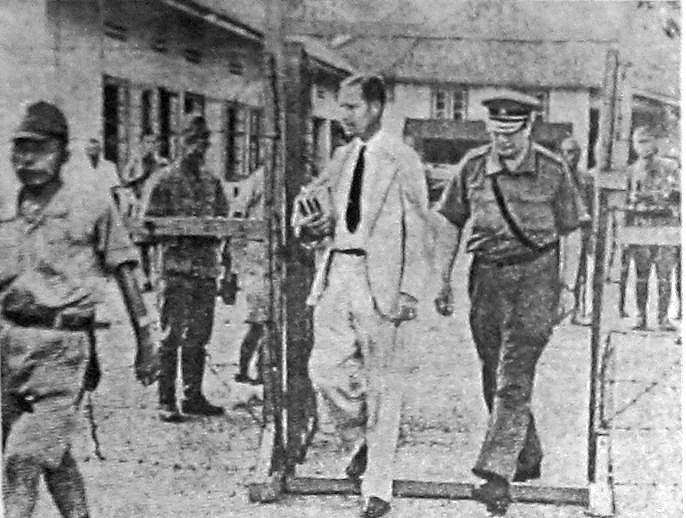
Governor-General Tjarda van Starkenborgh Stachouwer and General Hein ter Poorten, brought into an internment camp; the two capitulated to invading Japanese forces on 9 March 1942, leading to a three-year long occupation.

When World War II broke out in Europe, it was expected that the Japanese, who had already made aggressive moves against mainland China, would try to invade the Indies. In response, the Dutch colonial government – which had previously limited military training for native Indonesians – began teaching the populace how to deal with air raids. To co-ordinate the preparations, the Dutch formed Air Raid Preparation teams. Sudirman, respected in the community, was asked to lead the Cilacap chapter. Aside from teaching local citizens the safety procedures for dealing with an air raid, Sudirman established watchposts throughout the area. He and the Dutch would also have passing aircraft drop materials to simulate a bombing run; this was intended to improve response time.

After the Japanese began occupying the Indies in early 1942, winning several battles against Dutch and Dutch-trained forces of the Royal Netherlands East Indies Army (Koninklijk Nederlands Indisch Leger, or KNIL), on 9 March 1942 Governor-General Tjarda van Starkenborgh Stachouwer and head of the KNIL General Hein ter Poorten capitulated. This brought drastic changes in the governance of the archipelago and reduced the quality of life for non-Japanese in the Indies, many of whom suffered from widespread human rights violations at the hands of the Japanese. In Cilacap, Sudirman's school had been closed and turned into a military outpost; this was part of a widespread effort to close private schools. (Note: Sources differ on who closed the school, either the Dutch (Sardiman 2008, p. 108) or the Japanese (Imran 1980, p. 17).) After Sudirman convinced the Japanese to reopen the school, he and the other teachers were forced to use substandard supplies. Sudirman was also involved in several social and humanitarian organisations during this period, including as chair of the Indonesian People's Cooperative. This brought him greater recognition among the people of Cilacap.

=== Pembela Tanah Air ===
In early 1944, after a year as a representative at the Japanese-run regency council board (Syu Sangikai), Sudirman was asked to join the Defenders of the Homeland (PETA; Pembela Tanah Air); the Japanese occupation government had established PETA in October 1943 to help repel any Allied invasion, and were focused on recruiting younger men, those who had "not yet been 'contaminated'" by Dutch rule. After a few days of hesitance, caused in part by a knee injury he had occurred as a youth, Sudirman agreed to begin training in Bogor. Owing to his standing in the community, Sudirman was made a commander (daidanco) and trained with other persons of that rank. Trained by Japanese officers and soldiers, the cadets were armed with confiscated Dutch equipment. After four months of training Sudirman was put in charge of the battalion stationed at Kroya, Banyumas, Central Java, not far from Cilacap. (Note: The rank of an officer was based on his standing in society. The lowest-level officers, platoon leaders known as shodanco, were recent graduates. Company commanders, known as cudanco, were established members of society. The battalion commanders were drawn from respected members of society (Sardiman 2008, p. 109). Said (1991, p. 56) writes that the daidanco served mainly as father figures and motivators, and as such received little military training. Sudirman would continue to serve as a father figure throughout the revolution.)

Sudirman's time as a PETA commander passed uneventfully until 21 April 1945, when PETA troops under the command of Kusaeri began to rebel against the Japanese. Ordered to stop the rebellion, Sudirman agreed to do so only if the PETA rebels would not be harmed, and places harbouring them not razed; this condition was accepted by the Japanese commander, and Sudirman and his troops began searching for the rebels.

Although Kusaeri's men initially shot at the commander, after Sudirman used a loudspeaker to tell them they would not be harmed, they backed down. Kusaeri surrendered on 25 April. (Note: For his role in the rebellion Kusaeri was sentenced to death by the Japanese military court. However, owing to pressures against the Japanese home islands by Allied forces he was not executed (Adi 2011, p. 32).) This garnered support for Sudirman within the occupation forces, although several high-ranking Japanese officers expressed concern over Sudirman's support for Indonesian independence. Sudirman and his men were soon sent to a camp in Bogor, ostensibly for training; however, they were tasked with hard labour as a way to prevent a further uprising, and rumours circulated that the PETA officers would be killed.

== National revolution ==
=== Commander of the Armed Forces ===
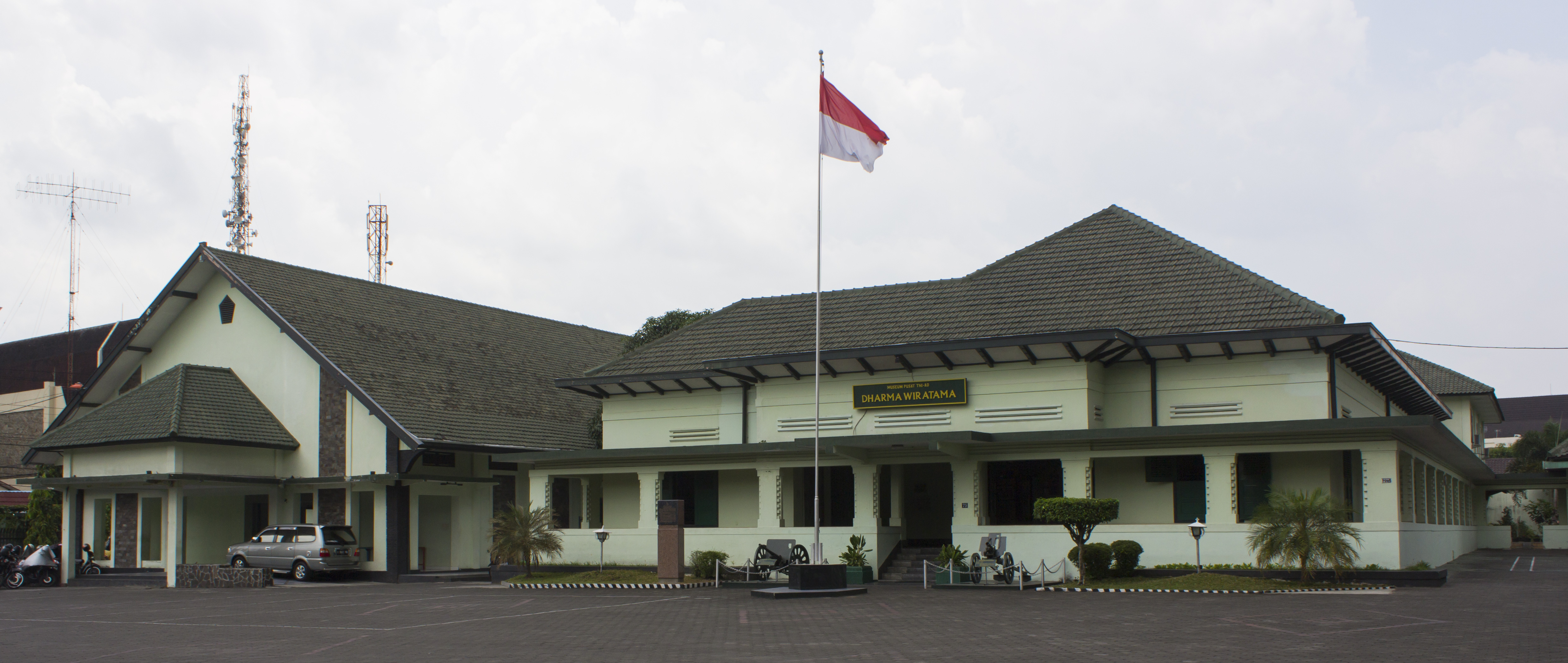
The first dedicated TKR headquarters, located in Gondokusuman, Yogyakarta; it is now the Dharma Wiratama Museum.

After news of the atomic bombings of Hiroshima and Nagasaki reached the Indies in early August 1945, followed by the proclamation of Indonesian independence on 17 August, it was evident that Japanese control was weakening. Sudirman led a break out from the camp in Bogor. Although his fellow internees wanted to attack the Japanese soldiers, Sudirman convinced them against it. After ordering the others to their hometowns, Sudirman made his way to Jakarta and met with President Sukarno, who asked him to lead resistance against Japanese forces in the city. Unfamiliar with Jakarta, Sudirman refused, instead offering to lead forces in Kroya. He left for his former command on 19 August 1945. At the same time, Allied forces were in the process of retaking the Indonesian archipelago for the Netherlands. (Note: Australian and United States forces, for example, had fought extensive campaigns in New Guinea and Borneo through 1945 (Coates 2006, pp. 278–280, 282), and the British retook Singapore in September 1945 (Bayly & Harper 2007, p. 194).) The first British forces arrived on 8 September 1945.

In late August, (Note: Said (1991, p. 23) gives the date as 22 August, while Anderson (2005, pp. 103–106) gives the date as 23 August.) Sukarno established the People's Safety Bureau (Badan Keamanan Rakjat, or BKR), which united troops from the former PETA, Heiho, and KNIL. The BKR served mostly as a police organisation, partly because the political leadership were intent on using diplomacy to garner international recognition of the new country and partly to avoid appearing overly aggressive to the Japanese forces still in the archipelago. Sudirman and several of his fellow PETA soldiers formed a BKR branch in Banyumas in late August, after stopping at Kroya and discovering that his battalion had been disbanded. In a meeting with the Japanese commander for the region, Saburo Tamura, and the resident of Banyumas, Iwashige, Sudirman and Iskaq Tjokrohadisurjo forced the Japanese to surrender and hand over their weapons while a crowd of armed Indonesians encircled the Japanese camp. Many of these weapons were later used by Sudirman's BKR unit, making it one of the best equipped in the country; surplus weapons were distributed to other battalions.

As the newly independent nation did not yet have a professional military, on 5 October 1945 Sukarno passed a decree establishing the People's Security Army (Tentara Keamaanan Rakjat or TKR, now known as the Tentara Nasional Indonesia). Most officers were former KNIL officers, while rank-and-file soldiers were mostly PETA and Heiho personnel. As the decreed Commander of the Armed Forces, Soeprijadi, failed to come forward, (Note: Soeprijadi, a PETA soldier who had led an uprising against Japanese forces in Blitar in February 1945, was thought dead. The historian Amrin Imran suggests that Soeprijadi's appointment may have been a way to see if he was still alive; it may have been thought that he would have certainly contacted the government in Jakarta to take over this post if he were (Imran 1983, pp. 71–72). Meanwhile, Said (1991, p. 28) suggests that Soeprijadi's selection was an indication of Sukarno's hesitancy to establish an army.) chief of staff Lieutenant General Oerip Soemohardjo served as an interim leader. That October British-led forces, tasked with disarming Japanese troops and repatriating Dutch prisoners of war, arrived in Semarang, then made their way south to Magelang. When the British began rearming repatriated Dutch prisoners and seemed to be preparing a military base in Magelang, Sudirman – now a colonel – sent some of his troops under Lieutenant Colonel Isdiman to drive them away; the mission was successful, and the European soldiers withdrew to Ambarawa, midway between Magelang and Semarang. On 20 October Sudirman was put in command of the Fifth Division, (Note: The Fifth Division covered the Kedu and Banyumas areas. It was one of ten divisions established by Oerip (Sardiman 2008, pp. 126–127).) after Oerip began dividing Java into different military commands.

On 12 November 1945, at the first general meeting of Army leadership, Sudirman was elected Commander of the Armed Forces (Panglima Besar) following two deadlocked votes. In the third round, Oerip had 21 votes to Sudirman's 22; the division commanders from Sumatra voted unanimously for Sudirman and swayed the ballot in his favour. (Note: Said (1991, p. 3) writes that the lack of political guidance while Oerip was commander-in-chief had led to the military choosing its own leader, rather than have one appointed. This meeting also saw the selection of Hamengkubuwana IX as minister of defence; his selection was not recognised by the government, which chose Amir Sjarifuddin (Said 1991, p. 41).) Sudirman, aged 29 at the time, was surprised at his selection and offered to relinquish the leadership position to Oerip, but the meeting did not allow it. Oerip himself, who had lost control of the meeting prior to the vote, was glad to no longer be in charge of the entire Army. Sudirman kept Oerip to serve as chief of staff under him. In accordance with his new role, Sudirman was promoted to general. After the meeting, Sudirman returned to Banyumas to await confirmation as leader of the TKR and began developing strategies on how repel Allied advances. The Indonesians feared that the Dutch, through the Netherlands Indies Civil Administration (Nederlandsch Indië Civil Administratie, or NICA), would attempt to retake the archipelago; soldiers of the Dutch-British alliance had landed in Java in September, and a large battle had occurred in Surabaya during late October and early November. This instability, as well as Sukarno's uncertainty about Sudirman's qualifications, (Note: Sudirman at the time had but two years military experience (Adi 2011, p. 50) The other leading candidate, Oerip, had been a military officer since before Sudirman was born (Imran 1983, p. 27).) led to a delay in Sudirman's confirmation.

While waiting for his appointment to be confirmed, in late November Sudirman ordered the Fifth Division to attack Allied forces stationed in Ambarawa, once again with Isdiman in charge; the city was considered strategically important owing to its military barracks and training facilities dating from the colonial period. This assault was countered by an air strike and the use of tanks, which forced the division to retreat; Isdiman died in the battle, killed by a strafing P-51 Mustang Sudirman then led the Division in another assault against Allied forces; the Indonesian troops were armed with a variety of weapons, ranging from bamboo spears and confiscated katanas to rifles, while the British were armed with modern equipment. Sudirman led from the front, wielding a katana. The Allies, whose air support had been cut off when guerrilla soldiers attacked Kalibenteng Airfield in Semarang, were forced onto the defensive and holed up in Willem Fortress. On 12 December Sudirman led a four-day siege, which resulted in the Allied force withdrawing to Semarang. (Note: The historian Richard McMillan, writing in 2005, suggests the withdrawal was not in response to the attack, but as the British mandate to repatriate prisoners of war had been completed (quoted in Setiadi & Yuliawati 2012, p. 22).)

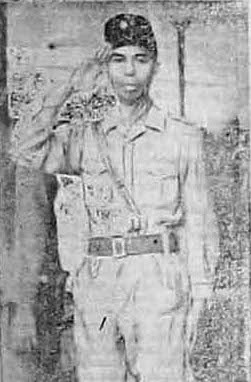
Sudirman, early 1946

The Battle of Ambarawa brought Sudirman greater attention at a national level, and generally silenced whispers that he was unfit for military command because of his lack of military experience and previous employment as a schoolteacher. Ultimately, Sudirman was chosen as his loyalty was undoubted, while Oerip's former pledge of loyalty to the Dutch led to him being viewed with suspicion. Sudirman was confirmed as commander of the Armed Forces on 18 December 1945. He was replaced as head of the Fifth Division by Colonel Sutiro, and began to focus on strategic problems. This was done partly by establishing a board of advisors, which gave the general advice on both political and military issues. (Note: Said (1991, pp. 59–61) notes that numerous Indonesian government and military leaders from after the war have stated that they served on this board.) Oerip handled many of the military matters.

Together, Sudirman and Oerip were able to reduce the differences and mistrust between former KNIL and PETA troops, although some troops were reluctant to be subordinated to a central command, instead choosing to follow their popularly selected battalion commanders. The government renamed the Army twice in January 1946, first to the Peoples' Salvation Armed Forces (Tentara Keselamatan Rakjat), then to the Republic of Indonesia Military Forces (Tentara Repoeblik Indonesia, or TRI/RIMF). This was followed by the formal establishment of a navy and air force in early 1946. In the meantime, the Indonesian government had moved from Jakarta – now under Dutch control – to Yogyakarta in January; delegates led by Prime Minister Sutan Sjahrir spent much of April and May unsuccessfully negotiating for Dutch recognition of Indonesian sovereignty. On 25 May Sudirman was reconfirmed as commander of the expanded military, after its reorganisation. At the ceremony, Sudirman swore to protect the republic "until he shed his last drop of blood." (Note: Original: "... sampai titi' darah jang penghabisan.")

The leftist Minister of Defence Amir Sjarifuddin, who had received greater power in the reorganisation, began collecting socialist and communist troops under his direct control, as well as leftist paramilitary units (laskar) that were funded by and loyal to the various political parties. (Note: The Socialist Party of Indonesia, for example, had Pesindo, while the Masyumi Party had Hisbollah (Said 1991, p. 24).) The minister instituted political education programmes in the army, which were meant to spread leftist ideology. This use of the military for political manoeverings disappointed both Sudirman and Oerip, who were at the time busy ensuring equal treatment for soldiers from different military backgrounds. However, rumours among the populace had spread that Sudirman was preparing for a coup d'état; although an attempt did occur in early July 1946, Sudirman's role, if any, is not certain. (Note: Prime Minister Sjahrir and several other government ministers were kidnapped on 27 June 1946 but released shortly afterwards. On 3 July Major General Sudarsono Reksoprodjo arrived at the presidential palace in Yogyakarta with a note, purportedly from Sudirman, that Sudirman was now president and had dismissed the cabinet. Sudarsono and his followers, many of whom were known to support the communist Tan Malaka, were arrested. Sudirman denied any involvement, telling Sukarno that his orders were always handwritten (Said 1991, pp. 63–65).) In July Sudirman addressed these rumours through a speech broadcast on Radio Republik Indonesia (RRI), stating that he, like all Indonesians, was a servant of the State, and that, if he were offered the presidency, he would refuse it. In his later career he stated that the military had no place in politics, and vice versa.

=== Negotiations with the Dutch ===
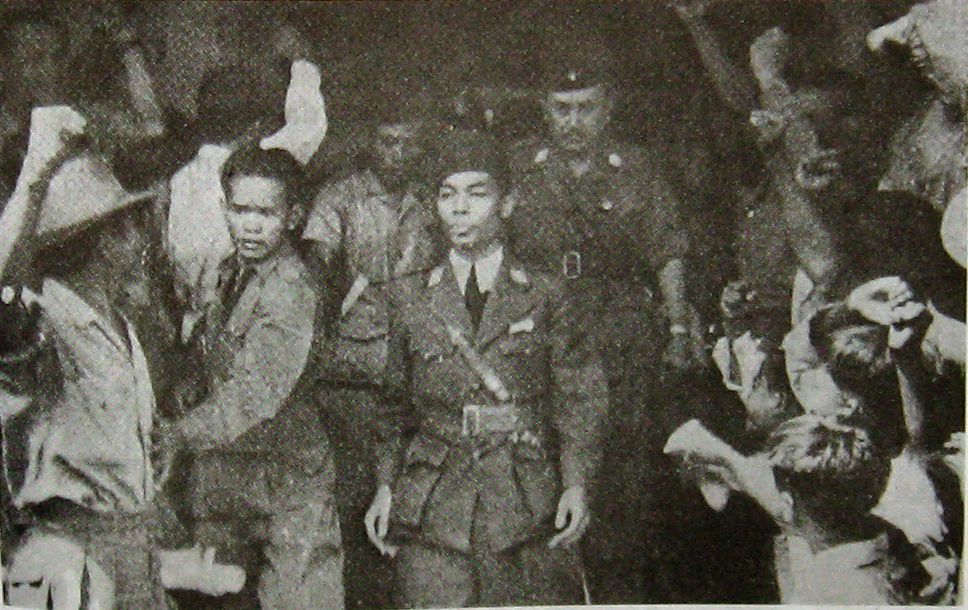
Sudirman arriving in Jakarta on 1 November 1946

Meanwhile, Sjahrir continued to work on negotiations with the Allied forces. On 7 October 1946, Sjahrir and the former Dutch Prime Minister, Wim Schermerhorn, agreed to work towards a ceasefire. The discussions were to be moderated by the British diplomat Lord Killearn and involved Sudirman. He took a specially commissioned train to Jakarta, departing on 20 October. However, he ordered it to return to Yogyakarta when Dutch troops refused to allow him and his men to enter the city with their weapons, feeling that such an order violated his sense of honour; the Dutch apologised, construing the events as a misunderstanding. Sudirman took another train in late October, arriving at Gambir Station in Jakarta on 1 November, where he was greeted by large crowds. The discussions in Jakarta resulted in the drafting of the Linggadjati Agreement on 15 November; the agreement was ratified on 25 March 1947, despite heavy opposition from Indonesian nationalists. Sudirman was vocally against the agreement, which he found to be detrimental to Indonesian interests, but considered himself obliged to follow his orders.

In early 1947, with the Linggadjati Agreement granting relative peace, Sudirman began work on consolidating the TKR with various laskar. As part of a committee, Sudirman began reorganising the military; they reached an agreement in May 1947, and on 3 June 1947 the Indonesian National Armed Forces (Tentara Nasional Indonesia, or TNI) was formalised; it consisted of TKR forces and various laskar groups, which Sudirman had included only after realising the extent of their manipulation by the political parties. However, the ceasefire obtained through the Linggadjati Agreement was not long lasting. On 21 July 1947 the Dutch forces – which had occupied areas left by the British during their withdrawal – launched Operation Product, and quickly gained control of large swaths of Java and Sumatra; the national government in Yogyakarta remained untouched. Sudirman called the army to fight, using the code "Ibu Pertiwi is calling! Ibu Pertiwi is calling!", (Note: Original: "Iboe Pertiwi memanggil! Iboe Pertiwi memanggil!" Ibu Pertiwi is a personification of the country.) and later delivered several speeches over RRI in an attempt to encourage soldiers to fight against the Dutch. However, the Indonesian soldiers were unprepared and their lines crumbled quickly.

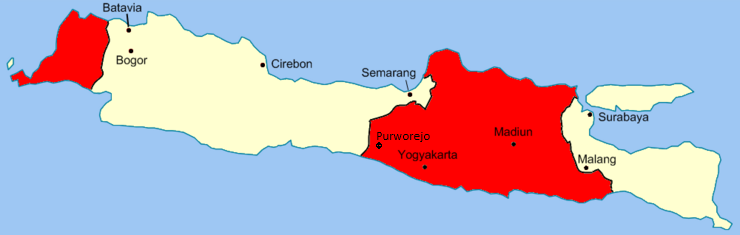
The Van Mook Line, with areas under Indonesian control in red; in 1947 Sudirman was forced to recall over 35,000 troops from Dutch-held areas.

Pressured by the United Nations, which had looked at the situation in the former East Indies with disdain, on 29 August 1947 the Dutch established the Van Mook Line, which divided Dutch and Indonesian-controlled areas. Along this line a ceasefire was called. Sudirman recalled the Indonesian guerrillas hiding in Dutch-held lands, ordering them to return to Indonesian-held areas. To keep their spirits up, he referred to the withdrawal as a hijrah, reminiscent of Muhammad's migration to Medina in 622 AD, implying that they would return. Over 35,000 troops left western Java at this order, travelling to Yogyakarta by train and ship. This boundary was formalised by the Renville Agreement on 17 January 1948; among the signatories was Amir Sjarifuddin, by then also serving as prime minister. Meanwhile, Sjarifuddin began rationalising the army, cutting back on the number of troops. At the time the regular army consisted of 350,000 men, with a further 470,000 in the laskar.

In this programme, by presidential decree Sudirman was no longer commander-in-chief of the military starting on 2 January 1948. He was demoted to lieutenant general, while Chief of the Air Force Soerjadi Soerjadarma was intended to be commander-in-chief. Shortly afterwards, Sjarifuddin was ousted in a vote of no confidence for his involvement in the Renville Agreement, and the new prime minister, Mohammad Hatta, worked to implement the rationalisation programme. This led to a several months-long debate between pro- and anti-rationalisation groups. Sudirman served as a rallying point and driving force for soldiers, including numerous older commanders, who were against the programme. Sudirman was formally reinstated on 1 June 1946, upon which he effectively rescinded the command to rationalise. He chose Colonel Abdul Haris Nasution as his deputy, but remained a lieutenant general.

As the rationalisation programme was winding down, Sjarifuddin began gathering soldiers from the Socialist Party, Communist Party, and members of the All Indonesia Centre of Labour Organizations for a would-be proletarian revolution in Madiun, East Java, which occurred on 18 September 1948. Sudirman, ill at the time, sent Nasution to deal with the revolution; Sudirman also sent two other officers as peace feelers before the attacks. Although the revolutionary leader Muso was amenable to peace, Nasution and his soldiers had quashed the uprising by 30 September. (Note: This led to a purge against leftists over several months. Sjarifuddin was among those executed for their involvement in the rebellion (Adi 2011, pp. 82–84).) Sudirman visited Madiun not long after the battle, later telling his wife that he had been unable to sleep there for all the bloodshed.

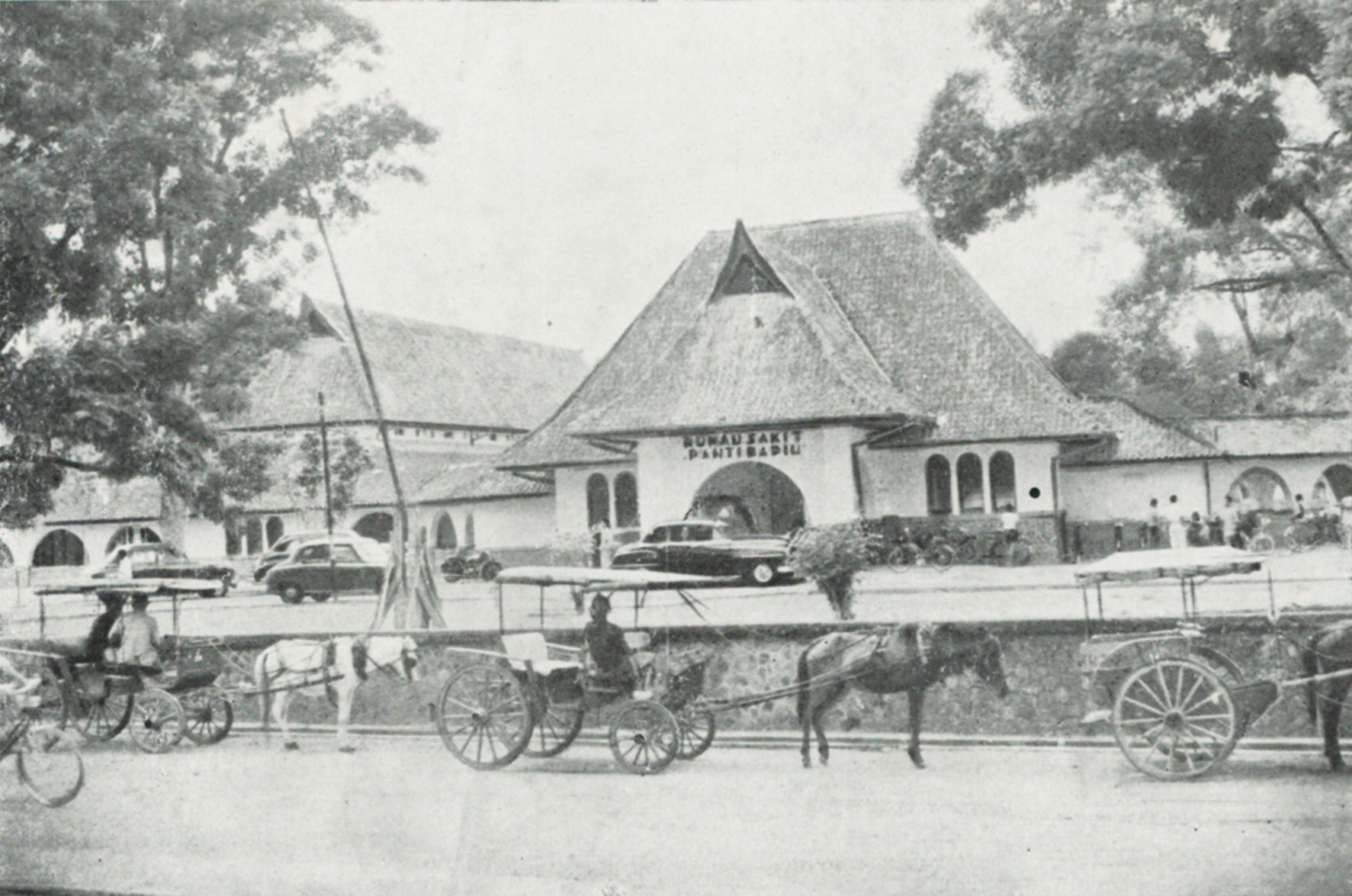
Panti Rapih Hospital (pictured c. 1956), where Sudirman was treated for tuberculosis

This rebellion, and ongoing political instability, sapped Sudirman of much of his remaining strength. On 5 October 1948, after celebrations of the military's third anniversary, Sudirman collapsed. After being examined by numerous doctors, he was diagnosed with tuberculosis. At the end of the month he was brought to Panti Rapih Hospital and had his right lung collapsed, in hope that it would stop the spread of the disease. During his time at the hospital, he delegated most of his duties to Nasution. However, the two continued to discuss plans for the war against the Dutch, and Sudirman continued to receive status reports. They agreed that guerrilla warfare, which had been applied on raids into Dutch-held territory since May, would be best suited for their needs; towards this goal, Sudirman issued a general order on 11 November, with Nasution handling most of the preparations. (Note: In the event the central government was captured, this plan allowed for the creation of a military-dominated government in Java that was led by the central headquarters. This plan was ultimately put in motion after Operation Kraai (Said 1991, pp. 102–105).) Sudirman was released from the hospital on 28 November 1948.

Although he continued to issue orders, Sudirman only returned to active duty on 17 December; in light of the growing tension between the Dutch and Indonesian forces, he ordered the TNI soldiers to maintain an increased level of awareness; he also ordered large-scale military exercises as a in an unsuccessful attempt to convince the Dutch that the TNI was too strong to be attacked. Two days later, after a nighttime announcement that they were no longer bound by the Renville Agreement, on 19 December the Dutch launched Operation Kraai, an attempt to capture the capital at Yogyakarta. By 07:10 local time (UTC+7), the airfield at Maguwo had been taken by paratroopers under the command of Captain Eekhout. Sudirman, upon becoming aware of the attack, had an order read over RRI which stated that soldiers should fight as they had been trained – as guerrillas.

Tactical Order
No. 1/PB/D/48

1. We have been attacked.
2. On 19 December 1948 the Dutch Military attacked the city of Yogyakarta and the Maguwo airfield.
3. The Dutch government has negated the Ceasefire.
4. All soldiers are to deal with the Dutch attack as previously agreed. (Note: Original: Perintah Kilat No. 1/PB/D/48: 1. Kita telah diserang.; 2. Pada tanggal 19 Desember 1948 Angkatan Perang Belanda menjerang kota Jogjakarta dan lapangan terbang Magoewo.; 3. Pemerintah Belanda telah membatalkan persetoedjoean Gentjatan Sendjata.; 4. Semoea Angkatan Perang mendjalankan rentjana jang telah ditetapkan oentoek menghadapi serangan Belanda.)

— Sudirman's radio address, from Imran (1980, p. 55)

He then went to the Presidential Palace in central Yogyakarta, where the government leaders were discussing an ultimatum which stated that the city would be stormed unless the leadership accepted colonial rule. Sudirman urged that the president and vice-president leave the city and fight as guerrillas, actions they had previously promised, but this suggestion was rejected. Although his doctors forbade it, Sudirman received permission from Sukarno to join his men. The central government evacuated to the Kraton Ngayogyakarta Hadiningrat at the urging of Sultan Hamengkubuwana IX, but were captured and exiled.

=== Guerrilla warfare ===
Sudirman first went to his official home and gathered sensitive documents, which he burned to prevent them falling into Dutch hands. His convoy, consisting of Sudirman, a small group of soldiers, and his personal doctor, then made their way south, towards Kretek, Parangtritis, Bantul. There they were received by the district head at 18:00. After several days in Kretek, during which time Sudirman sent undercover troops into the Dutch-occupied city for reconnaissance and to ask his wife for jewellery to sell and help fund the guerrilla movement, he and his group travelled east along the south coast to Wonogiri. Before the Dutch attack it had already been decided that Sudirman would be able to better control the guerrillas from eastern Java, where there were still several bases. Meanwhile, Alfiah and the children were ordered to stay in the Kraton. Aware that he was being pursued by the Dutch, on 23 December Sudirman ordered his troops to continue to Ponorogo, where they stopped at the home of Mahfuz, a kyai and Islamic religious leader; Mahfuz gave the general a cane to help him walk, although Sudirman was, and continued to be, carried on a litter. They then continued east.

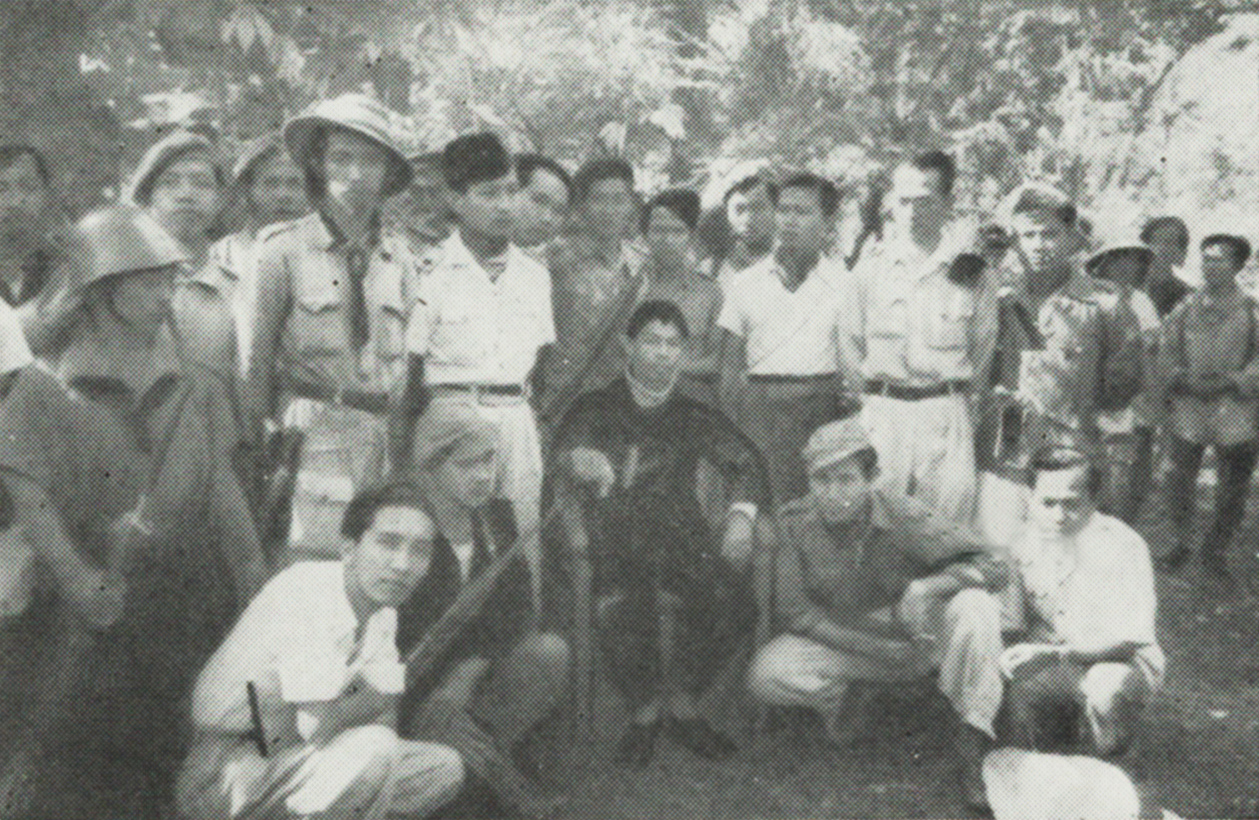
Sudirman, surrounded by his guerrillas during their campaign

Outside of Trenggalek, Sudirman and his group were stopped by TNI soldiers belonging to 102 Battalion. These soldiers, who were told that Sudirman – who was in civilian clothes and unrecognised by the troops holding them – had been taken prisoner, refused to allow the group to pass; they were suspicious as Sudirman's convoy carried maps and notes on Indonesian military movements, things which may have belonged to spies. When the group's commander, Major Zainal Fanani, came to check the situation, he realised that Sudirman was with them and apologised. Told that his men were right to guard their areas diligently, Fanani called a post in Kediri and ordered that a car be sent to pick up the general and his troops. After a time in Kediri, they continued further east; as they left the city on 24 December, Dutch planes attacked Kediri.

The constant Dutch attacks led Sudirman, perhaps at the suggestion of one of his men, to change his clothes and give his old outfit to one of his soldiers, Second Lieutenant Heru Kesser – who bore a resemblance to Sudirman. Kesser was ordered to head south with a large company of soldiers, remove the clothes, and furtively return north, while Sudirman waited in Karangnongko. The diversion was successful, and on 27 December Sudirman and his men made their way to Jambu Village. Arriving on 9 January 1949, Sudirman met with several government ministers who had not been present during the Dutch attack on Yogyakarta: Supeno, Susanto Tirtoprojo, and Susilowati. With the politicians, Sudirman made his way to Banyutuwo, ordering some of his soldiers to linger back and hold off Dutch ground troops. In Banyutuwo, they held for over a week. However, on 21 January, when Dutch forces approached the village, Sudirman and his entourage were forced to leave, fighting their way out in heavy rain.

Sudirman and his troops continued to make their way through the jungles and forests, eventually arriving at Sobo, near Mount Lawu, on 18 February. During the journey, Sudirman used a radio set to convey orders to local TNI troops if he believed that the region was secure. Feeling weaker because of the physical hardships he had faced, including malnutrition, and believing the area to be safe, Sudirman decided that Sobo would serve as his guerrilla headquarters. The local commander, Lieutenant Colonel Wiliater Hutagalung, served as his go-between with the other TNI leaders. Aware that international opinion, which was beginning to condemn Dutch actions in Indonesia, could bring Indonesia greater recognition, Sudirman and Hutagalung discussed possible terms of action before agreeing on a large-scale assault. Meanwhile, the Dutch began to spread propaganda claiming that they had captured Sudirman; this claim was intended to break the morale of the guerrillas.

Sudirman ordered Hutagalung to begin planning a full-scale assault, in which TNI soldiers – in uniform – would attack the Dutch and show their strength in front of foreign reporters and United Nations investigative teams. Hutagalung, together with officers under his commander Colonel Bambang Sugeng and government officials under Governor Wongsonegoro, spent several days discussing ways to ensure the attack could be successful. The discussion may have resulted in the General Offensive of 1 March 1949, which saw TNI soldiers attack Dutch outposts throughout central Java. Troops under Lieutenant Colonel Suharto retook Yogyakarta for six hours before withdrawing, a successful show of force which caused the Dutch to lose face internationally; they had previously declared the TNI eradicated. However, who truly ordered the offensive remains uncertain: Suharto and Hamengkubuwana IX claimed responsibility, while Bambang Sugeng's brother reportedly overheard him ordering the assault.

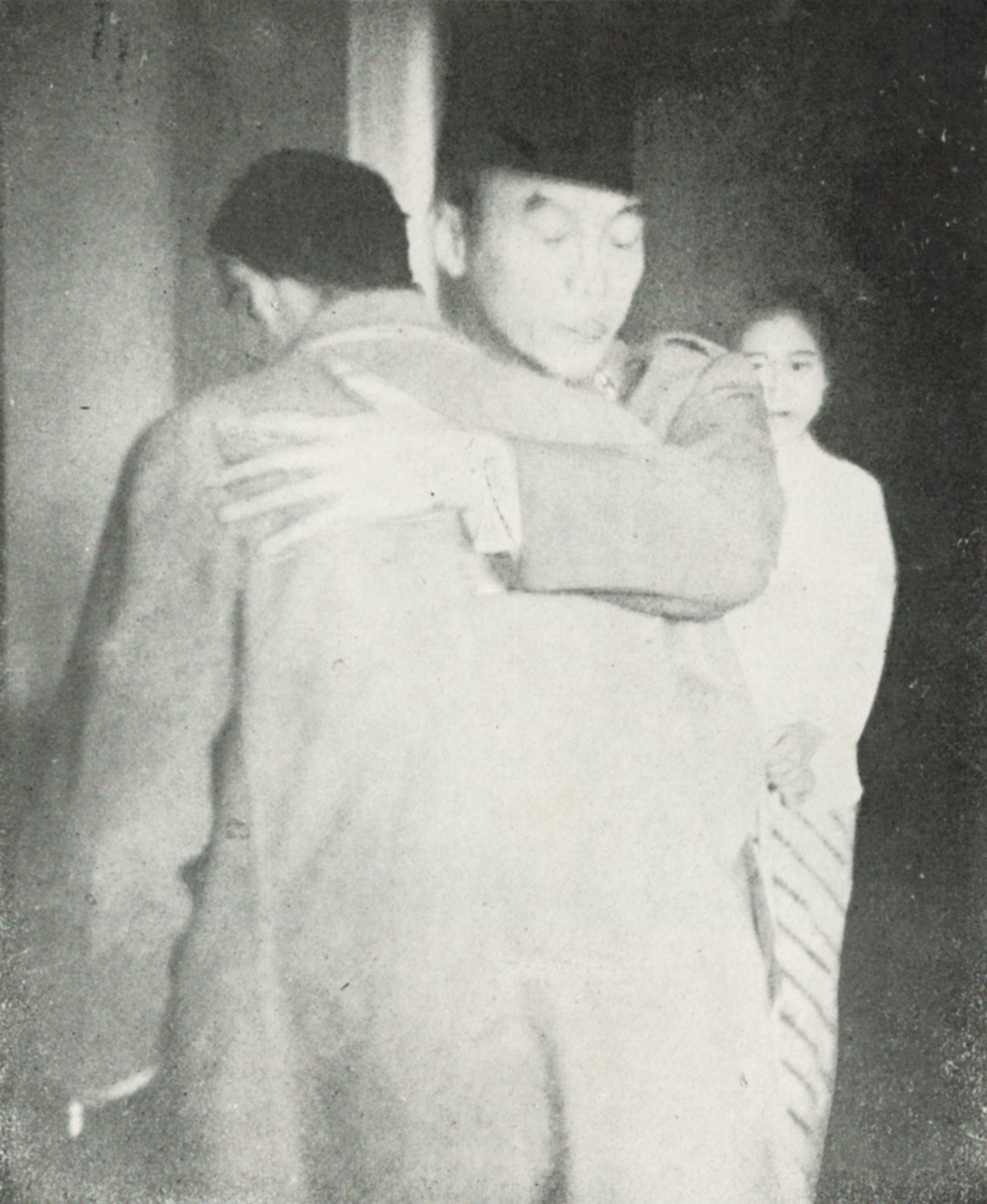
Sudirman (left) being embraced by President Sukarno upon his return to Yogyakarta.

Under increased pressure from the United Nations, on 7 May 1949 Dutch–Indonesian negotiations resulted in the Roem–Van Roijen Agreement, a controversial measure which guaranteed Dutch withdrawal from Yogyakarta, among other points; (Note: This agreement was initially opposed by both the Dutch and Indonesian militaries but ultimately passed (Said 1991, pp. 116–118).) The Dutch withdrawal commenced in late June, and the Indonesian leadership began returning to Yogyakarta from exile in early July. Sukarno ordered Sudirman to return to Yogyakarta as well, but Sudirman refused to let the Dutch withdraw without a fight; he considered the TNI to now be strong enough to defeat the dispirited Dutch. Although he was promised medicine and support in Yogyakarta, Sudirman refused to return to the political leadership, whom he considered acquiescent to the Dutch. He only agreed to return after receiving a letter, although sources disagree on its sender. (Note: Said (1991, p. 119) writes that the letter was sent by Hamengkubuwana IX and delivered by Suharto, while Imran (1980, pp. 75–80) credits a letter from Sudirman's subordinate and close friend, Colonel Gatot Soebroto.) On 10 July, Sudirman and his group returned to Yogyakarta, where they were greeted by thousands of civilians and warmly received by the political elite there. The reporter Rosihan Anwar, who was present when the letter was delivered, wrote in 1973 that "Sudirman had to return to Yogyakarta to avoid any perceptions of a rift among the republic's top leaders".

== Post-war and death ==
In early August Sudirman approached Sukarno and asked him to continue the guerrilla war; Sudirman did not expect the Dutch to abide by the Roem-Royen Agreement, based on the failings of the previous agreements. Sukarno disagreed, which was a blow to Sudirman. When Sudirman threatened to resign his post, blaming the government's inconsistency for his tuberculosis and Oerip's death in November 1948, Sukarno threatened to do so as well. As he thought that such a resignation would have a destabilising effect, Sudirman stayed his hand, and a Java-wide cease fire came into effect on 11 August 1949.

Continuing to suffer from tuberculosis, Sudirman was checked into Panti Rapih hospital, where he stayed until October, when he was transferred to a sanatorium in nearby Pakem. As a result of his illness, Sudirman made few public appearances. Sudirman was transferred to a home in Magelang in December. In the meantime, the Indonesian and Dutch governments held a several-month-long conference which resulted in Dutch recognition of Indonesian sovereignty on 27 December 1949. Sudirman, despite his illness, was reconfirmed that day as commander-in-chief of the TNI, now serving the newly established Republic of the United States of Indonesia. On 28 December, Jakarta once again became the nation's capital.

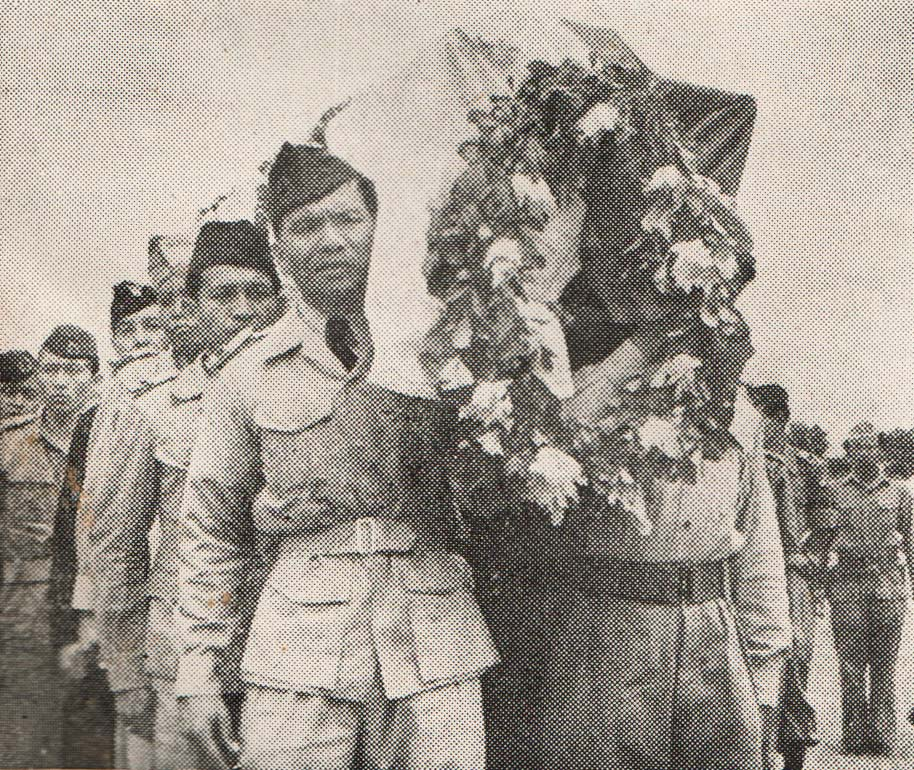
Sudirman's casket being carried by soldiers

Sudirman died in Magelang at 18:30 on 29 January 1950; this was reported in a special broadcast over RRI. Upon receiving news of his death, the Sudirman family home received numerous visitors, including the entirety of the 9th Brigade, which was stationed nearby. The following morning Sudirman's body was brought to Yogyakarta. As the funeral convoy passed, led by four tanks and consisting of eighty motor vehicles, thousands of mourners stood at the sides of the streets. The convoy was organised by members of the 9th Brigade.

The viewing, held at the Great Mosque of Yogyakarta in the afternoon, was attended by numerous political and military elite from both Indonesia and foreign countries; this included Prime Minister Abdul Halim, Minister of Defence Hamengkubuwana IX, Minister of Health Johannes Leimena, Minister of Justice Abdoel Gaffar Pringgodigdo, Minister of Information Arnold Mononutu, Chief of the Air Force Soerjadi Soerjadarma, Colonel Paku Alam VIII, and Suharto. The viewing was closed with a 24-gun salute. Sudirman's body was brought to Semaki Heroes' Cemetery on foot, with a crowd of mourners 2 kilometres (1.2 mi) long trailing behind. He was interred next to Oerip, after another gun salute. His wife filled in the first scoop of dirt, followed by the government ministers. The national government ordered flags to be flown at half-mast throughout the country, and Sudirman was promoted to full general. Major General Tahi Bonar Simatupang was selected as the new leader of the armed forces. Sudirman's memoirs were published later that year; a series of his speeches were also published in 1970.

An obituary in the Yogyakarta-based daily Kedaulatan Rakjat wrote that Indonesia had lost a "brave and true hero". (Note: Original: "... seorang pahlawan jang djudjur dan berani") Colonel Paku Alam VIII, in charge of the Yogyakarta area, told the national news agency Antara that all Indonesians, especially the armed forces, had "lost a father figure who did uncountable deeds for his country". (Note: Original: "... seluruh rakjat Indonesia umumnja dan angkatan perang chususnja, kehilangan seorang bapak jg tidak ternilai djasa2nja kepada tanah air ...") The Indonesian Muslim leader Haji Abdul Malik Karim Amrullah, writing soon after Sudirman's death, described the general as a "symbol of the strength of spirit shown by Indonesian heroes," (Note: Original: " ... lambang dari kebangunan djiwa pahlawan Indonesia.") while the Muslim politician Muhammad Isa Anshary described Sudirman as a "son of the revolution, as he was born in the revolution, and raised by the revolution." (Note: Original: "Putera revolusi, karena dia lahir dalam revolusi, dan dibesarkan oleh revolusi.") In a radio speech, Hatta described Sudirman as impossible to control and hard-headed, but ultimately intent on doing what was right for the country; Hatta noted that, although Sudirman often did not like the government's position, he would generally obey his orders.

Modern opinions in Indonesia tend to be laudatory. Sardiman, a professor of history at Yogyakarta State University, writes that Sudirman was as lively a speaker as Sukarno, who was known for his fiery speeches, and a devoted, incorruptible leader. The Indonesian historian and former Minister of Education and Culture Nugroho Notosusanto described Sudirman as "his only idol", citing the general's guerrilla period as the origin of the army's esprit de corps. The general's guerrilla campaign is emphasised in biographies of him because, during that period, the army had a greater role than the exiled political leadership; beginning in the 1970s, all military cadets had to retrace the 100-kilometre (62 mi) long route prior to graduation, a "pilgrimage" meant to instill a sense of struggle. Sudirman's grave is also a pilgrimage destination, both for the military and general public. According to Katharine McGregor of the University of Melbourne, the Indonesian military has elevated Sudirman to a saint-like status.

Sudirman received numerous awards from the national government posthumously, including the Bintang Sakti, Bintang Gerilya, Bintang Mahaputera Adipurna, Bintang Mahaputera Pratama, Bintang Republik Indonesia Adipurna, and Bintang Republik Indonesia Adipradana. (Note: The Bintang Sakti is a high-level military award for showing bravery above and beyond the call of duty (UU No. 20/2009, pp. 4, 10, 23). The Bintang Mahaputera is a high-level award for persons who have aided Indonesia's development, become experts in a certain field, or are widely recognised for their sacrifices for the country (UU No. 20/2009, pp. 4, 9, 23). The Bintang Republik Indonesia is the highest award available for civilians (Saragih 2012, SBY bestows honors).) On 10 December 1964 Sudirman was declared a National Hero of Indonesia by Presidential Decree 314 of 1964. Oerip was declared a National Hero by the same decree. He was posthumously promoted to General of the Army in 1997.

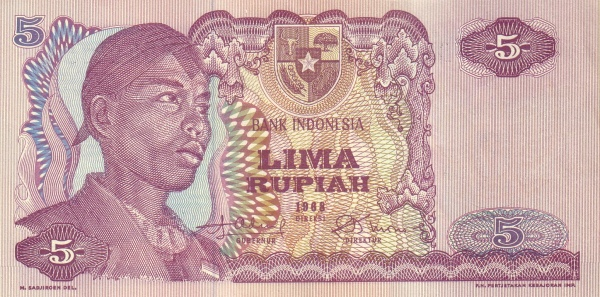
Sudirman on a 5 rupiah banknote, issued in 1968

According to McGregor, the military increasingly used Sudirman's image as a symbol of leadership as it gained more political power. An image of Sudirman was featured on every denomination of the 1968 series of rupiah. (Note: This included the 1, 2.5, 5, 10, 25, 50, 100, 500, and 1000 rupiah bills (Cuhaj 2012, pp. 501–502).) He featured as a major character in several war films, including Janur Kuning (Yellow Coconut Leaf; 1979) and Serangan Fajar (Dawn Attack; 1982).

Numerous museums have been dedicated to Sudirman. His childhood home in Purbalingga is now the Sudirman Museum, while his official home in Yogyakarta is now the Sasmitaloka Museum to General Sudirman. The house in Magelang where he died is also now the Sudirman Museum, established on 18 May 1967 and containing artefacts belonging to the general. Other museums, including the Monument Yogya Kembali in Yogyakarta and the Satriamandala Museum in Jakarta have rooms dedicated to him. Numerous streets are named after Sudirman, including a major street in Jakarta; McGregor states that nearly every city in the country has a General Sudirman Street. Statues and monuments to him are spread throughout the archipelago, most of which were built after 1970. Jenderal Sudirman University in Banyumas, established in 1963, is named after him. On 14 January 2011, the Japanese Ministry of Defense in Tokyo officially decided to place a statue of Sudirman in the back garden of the office.

== Notes ==
Military offices
New command Indonesian independence	Commander of the Indonesian War Forces; 1945–1950	Succeeded by Tahi Bonar Simatupang as Chief of Staff of the War Forces
