= Army general =

Four-star general military rank

Army general or General of the army is the highest ranked general officer in many countries that use the French Revolutionary System. Army general is normally the highest rank used in peacetime.

In countries that adopt the general officer four-rank system, it is the rank of a general commanding a field army. However, in some countries such as Brazil, Ecuador and Peru, which have adopted the three-rank system, the rank of army general is immediately above that of divisional general. As such, it is the rank of commander of an army corps or larger formations. The equivalent position in the Commonwealth, U.S., and several other countries is simply general, four-star rank, or informally "full general".

== Country specific ==
=== Army general ranks by country ===
- Army general (France)
- Army general (East Germany)
- Army general (Russia)
  - Army general (Soviet Union)
- Army general (Vietnam)
- Army general (Kingdom of Yugoslavia)
- General (United States)

=== Army generals' army insignia ===
Général d'armée
Arabic: فريق أول, romanized: Fariq 'awal
(Algerian Land Forces)

General de exército
(Angolan Army)

Բանակի գեներալ
Banaki general
(Armenian Ground Forces)

Ordu generalı
(Azerbaijani Armed Forces)

General de ejército
(Bolivian Army)

General de exército
(Brazilian Army)

Général d'armée
(Burkina Faso Army)

Général d'armée
(Cameroon Ground Forces)

Général d'armée
(Central African Ground Forces)

Général d'armée
(Chadian Ground Forces)

General de ejército
(Chilean Army)

Général d'armée
(Land Forces of the DR Congo)

Général d'armée
(Ground Forces of Côte d'Ivoire)

General de ejército
(Cuban Ground Forces)

Armádní generál
(Army of the Czech Republic)

General de ejercito
(Ecuadorian Army)

Général d'armée
(French Army)

Général d'armée
(Guinea Ground Forces)

Jenderal Besar
Grand General
(Indonesian National Armed Forces)

Армия генералы
Armiya generally
(Kazakh Ground Forces)

Général d'armée
(Malagasy Ground Forces)

Général d'armée
(Malian Army)

Général d'armée
Arabic: Fariq harb
(Royal Moroccan Army)

General de ejército
(Nicaraguan Army)

General de ejército
(Paraguayan Army)

General de ejército
(Peruvian Army)

Генера́л а́рмии
General armii
(Russian Ground Forces)

General de ejército
(Spanish Army)

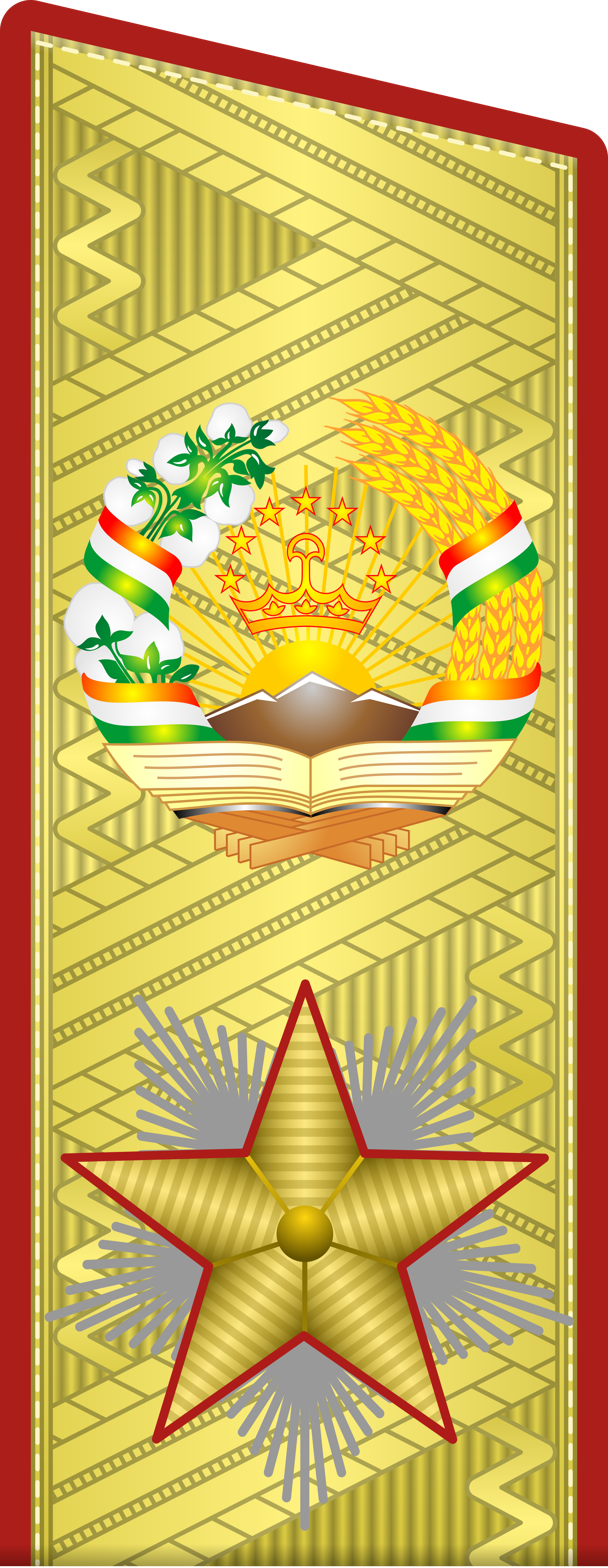
Генерали артиш
Generali artiş
(Tajik Ground Forces)

General of the Army
(United States Army)

Armiya generali
(Uzbek Ground Forces)

Goşun generally
(Turkmen Ground Forces)

=== Army generals' air force insignia ===
Բանակի գեներալ
Banaki general
(Armenian Air Force)

Général d'armée
(Air Force of Burkina Faso)

Général d'armée aérienne
(Cameroon Air Force)

Général d'armée
(Air Force of the DR Congo)

Général d'armée
(Ivory Coast Air Force)

General de ejército
(Cuban Air and Air Defense Force)

Armádní generál
(Czech Air Force)

Général d'armée aérienne
(French Air and Space Force)

Général d'armée
(Gabonese Air Force)

Армия Генералы
Armiya generally
(Kazakh Air Defense Forces)

Général d'armée
(Malagasy Air force)

Général d'armée aerienne
(Royal Moroccan Air Force)

General de ejército
(Nicaraguan Air Force)

Армиски Генерал
Armiski general
(North Macedonia Air Brigade)

генера́л а́рмии
General armii
(Russian Aerospace Forces)
