= Kusumanegara Heroes' Cemetery =

Cemetery in Indonesia

Kusumanegara Heroes' Cemetery Taman Makam Pahlawan Kusumanegara
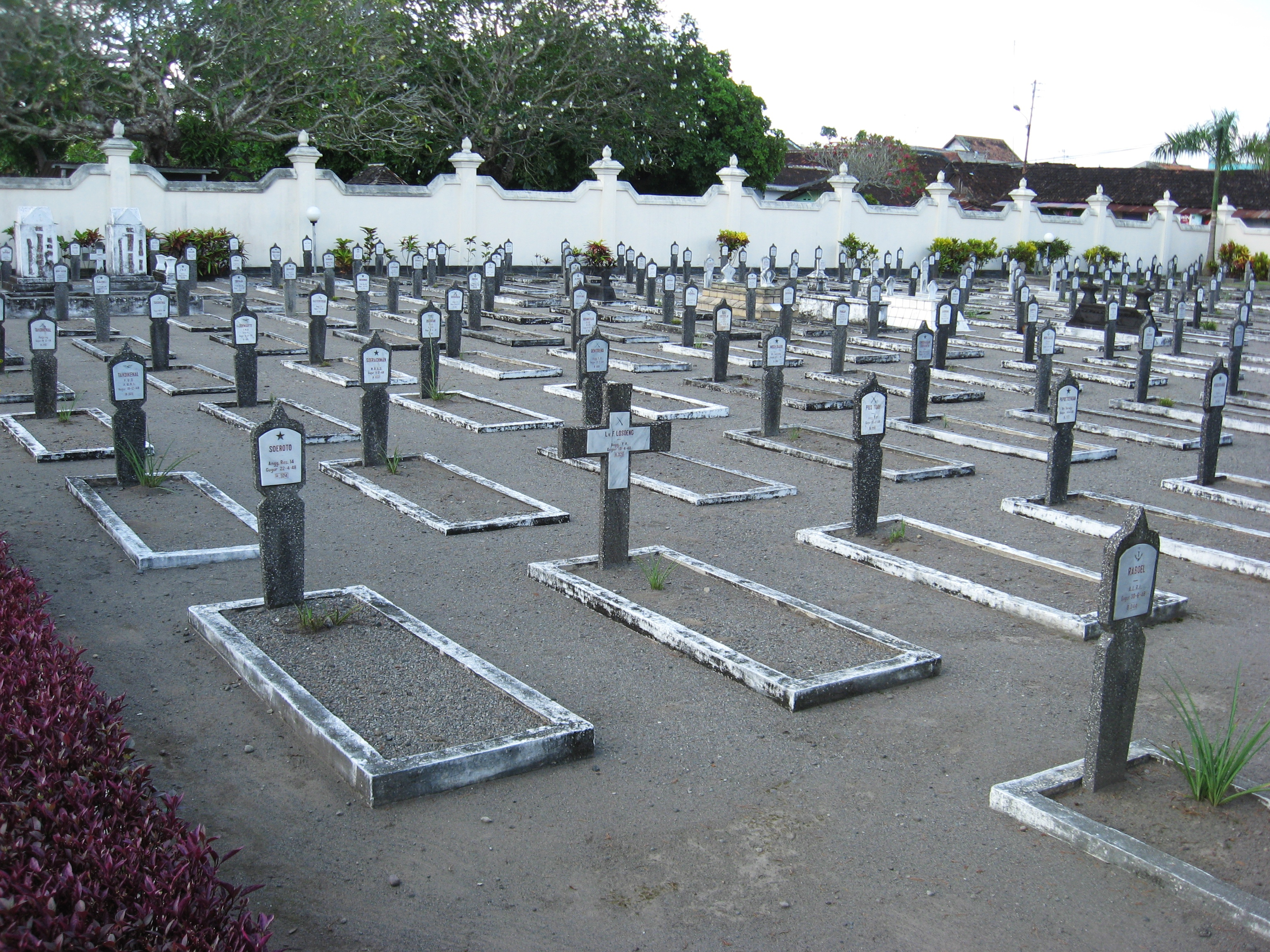
- Graves in the cemetery

Details
- Established: 7 October 1945
- Location: Kusumanegara Street, Yogyakarta
- Country: Indonesia
- Coordinates: 7°48′9.71″S 110°23′1.07″E
- Owned by: Indonesian National Government
- Size: 2.87 hectares (0.0287 km^{2}; 0.0111 sq mi)
- No. of graves: 1,914

Kusumanegara Heroes' Cemetery (Indonesian: Taman Makam Pahlawan Kusumanegara, Javanese: ꦠꦩꦤ꧀ꦩꦏꦩ꧀ꦥꦃꦭꦮꦤ꧀ꦏꦸꦱꦸꦩꦤꦼꦒꦫ, also spelled Kusuma Negara; also known as Semaki Heroes' Cemetery) is a cemetery located in Yogyakarta, Indonesia. It is the final resting place of five National Heroes of Indonesia.

== Description ==
The cemetery is located on Kusumanegara Street in Semaki, Umbulharjo, Yogyakarta. It covers 2.87 hectares (0.0287 km^{2}; 0.0111 sq mi) and is surrounded by both a concrete wall and iron fence. Aside from the graves, there is a central monument, meeting hall, and flag pole. A statue of General Sudirman, interred at the cemetery, stands at the front of the cemetery facing Kusumanegara Street.

As of July 2011, the cemetery held 1,914 graves. In November of that year it consisted of 1,065 persons from the Army, 156 from the Air Force, 56 from the Navy, 79 from the National Police, 404 civilians, and 131 unknown soldiers. Five of the interments are National Heroes of Indonesia.

== History ==
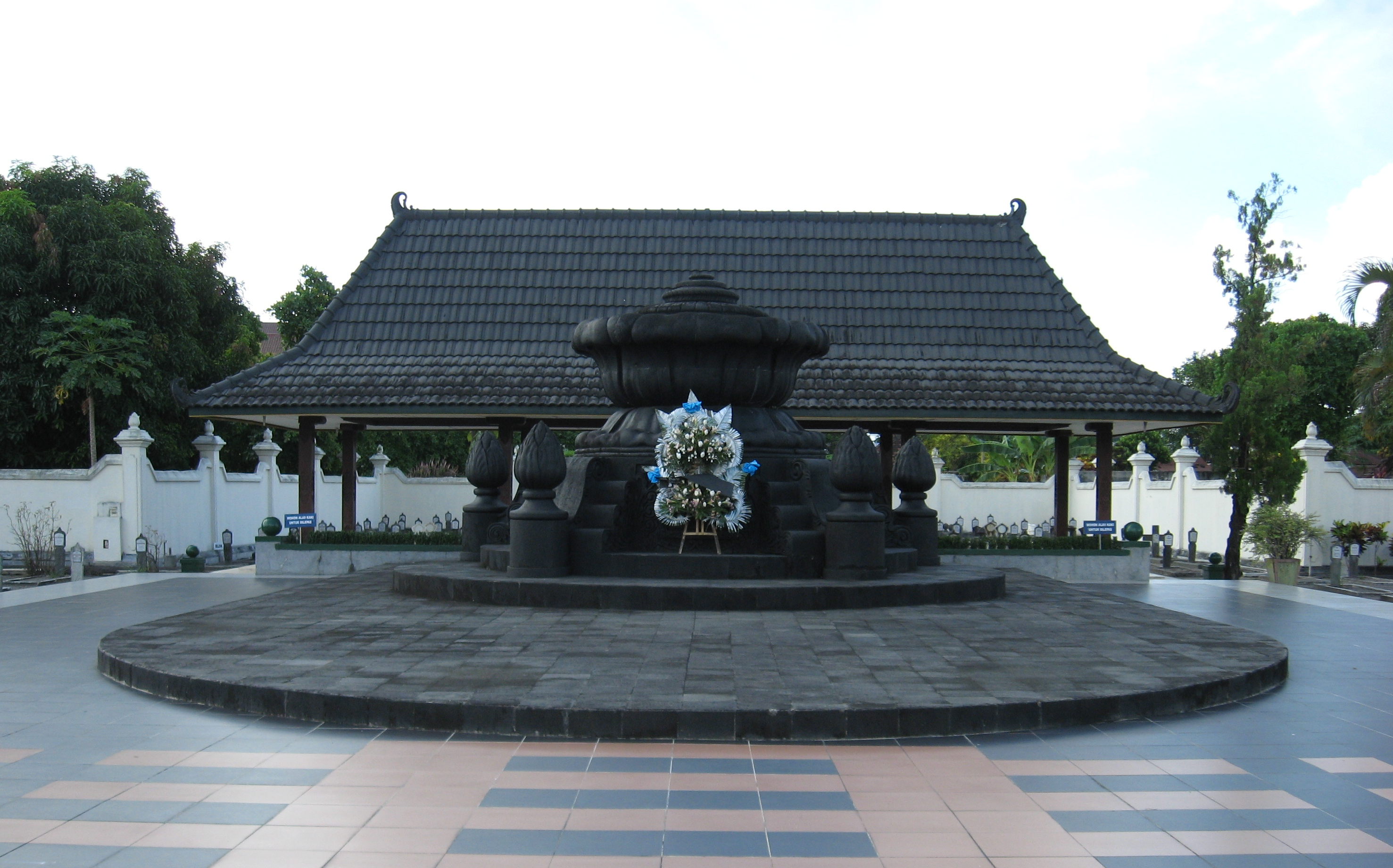
A central monument, before the graves of General Sudirman and his wife, as well as General Oerip Soemohardjo, and Soepeno

Kusumanegara was established on 7 October 1945. It was under the Indonesian Ministry of Defence, with day-to-day maintenance handled by Kodam IV/Diponegoro. In 1972, oversight was transferred to the Social Ministry per Decree of the Minister of Defence number Skep. B/33/V/1972. As Indonesia became increasingly decentralised, in 2004 maintenance and oversight was transferred to the Social Ministry of Yogyakarta.

In 2009, per Law number 20 of 2009, the cemetery's formal title became Kusumanegara National Heroes' Cemetery. In December 2011, Kusumanegara was maintained by seventeen people, mostly volunteers. Maintenance is funded by the Social Ministry (Dinas Sosial). It is open to the general public.

== Interments ==
=== Conditions ===
Kusumanegara accepts both military and non-military interments, assuming certain conditions. To be buried at the cemetery, civilians must have already died, been declared a National Hero of Indonesia, received orders, decorations, or medals allowing burial in a heroes' cemetery, or received presidential approval after going through the commander of Kodim 0734 and the Governor of Yogyakarta; this is based on Decision of the Social Minister 05 Huk/1996.

To be buried at the cemetery, military personnel must have either been declared a National Hero, died in the line of duty while actively protecting the Republic of Indonesia, or received at least one of ten decorations, (Note: Either the Bintang Republik Indonesia, Bintang Maha Putra, Bintang Sakti, Bintang Dharma, Bintang Gerilya, Bintang Yudha Dharma, Bintang Kartika Eka Paksi Utama or Pratama, Bintang Jalasena Utama or Pratama, Bintang Swa Bhuwana Paksa Utama or Pratama, or the Bintang Bayangkara Utama or Pratama; the latter four must be for deeds above and beyond the call of duty and not for seniority.) Civil servants in the Ministry of Defence, Armed Forces, or Police may be buried there if they have received at least one of six decorations. (Note: Either the Bintang Republik Indonesia, Bintang Maha Putra, Bintang Sakti, Bintang Dharma, Bintang Gerilya, Bintang Yudha Dharma)

=== Notable interments ===
- Cornel Simanjuntak, composer
- Katamso Darmokusumo, brigadier general killed during the 30 September Movement
- Oerip Soemohardjo, general and interim head of the Indonesian National Armed Forces
- Sardjito, first rector of Gadjah Mada University
- Sudirman, general and leader of the Indonesian National Armed Forces during the Indonesian National Revolution
- Sugiyono Mangunwiyoto, colonel killed during the 30 September Movement
- Supeno, government minister

== See also ==
- Kalibata Heroes' Cemetery
- Giri Tunggal Heroes' Cemetery
