= Oerip Soemohardjo =

Indonesian general (1893–1948)

General Raden Oerip Soemohardjo
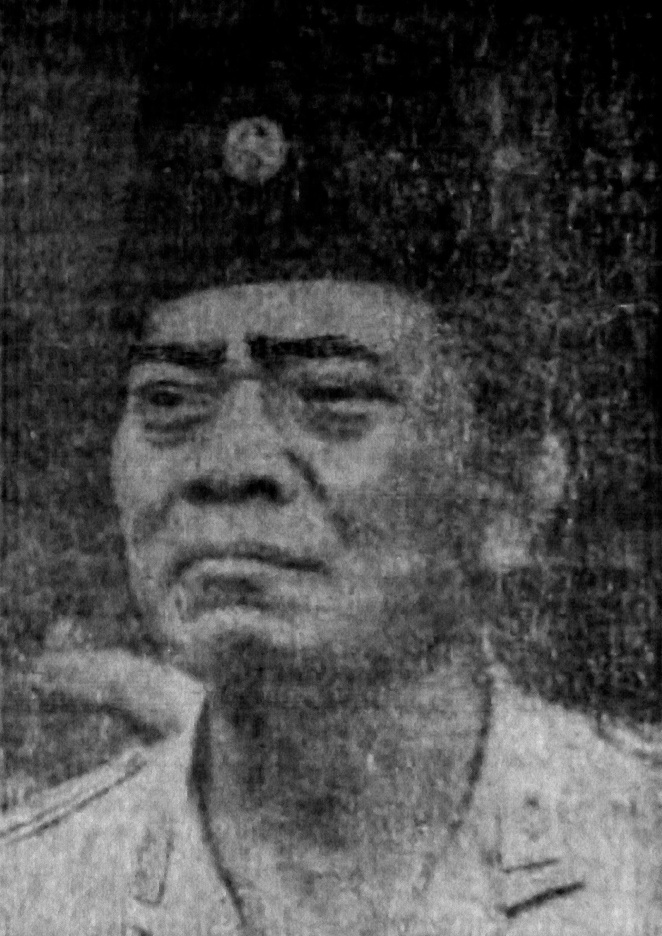
- Portrait of Oerip, c. 1947

Chief of General Staff of the Indonesian National Armed Forces
- In office 12 November 1945 – November 1948; Acting: 5 October – 12 November 1945
- President: Sukarno
- Preceded by: Office established
- Succeeded by: Lt. Gen. Sudirman

Personal details
- Born: Raden Moehammad Sidik; 22 February 1893 Purworejo, Dutch East Indies
- Died: 17 November 1948 (aged 55) Yogyakarta, Indonesia
- Resting place: Semaki Heroes' Cemetery
- Spouse: Rohmah Soebroto (m. 1926)

Military service
- Allegiance: Dutch East Indies; Indonesia
- Branch/service: Dutch East Indies Army; Indonesian Army
- Years of service: 1914–1939, 1942, 1945–1948
- Rank: Lieutenant general (at death)
- Commands: Indonesian Armed Forces (acting commander)
- Battles/wars: World War II; Indonesian National Revolution; Operation Product
- Awards: National Hero of Indonesia (posthumous, 1964)

General Raden Oerip Soemohardjo ([urɪp sumɔˈhardʒɔ]; Perfected Spelling: Urip Sumoharjo; 22 February 1893 – 17 November 1948) was an Indonesian general, the first chief of general staff of the Indonesian National Armed Forces, and acting Commander of the Indonesian National Armed Forces. He received several awards from the Indonesian government, including the title National Hero of Indonesia in 1964.

Born Moehammad Sidik in Purworejo, Dutch East Indies, Oerip Soemohardjo exhibited leadership skills from an early age. As his parents wanted him to become a regent, after elementary school Oerip was sent to the School for Native Government Employees (id) in Magelang. His mother died during his second year at the school, and Oerip left to undertake military training Koninklijke Militaire Academie in Meester Cornelis, Batavia (modern-day Jatinegara, Jakarta). Upon graduating in 1914, he became a lieutenant in the Royal Netherlands East Indies Army; during almost 25 years of service he was stationed on three different islands and promoted several times, eventually becoming the highest-ranking Native officer in the country.

Oerip Soemohardjo resigned from his position in about 1938 after a disagreement with the regent of Purworejo, where he had been stationed. He and his wife Rohmah then moved to a village near Yogyakarta, where they established a large garden and villa. After Nazi Germany invaded the Netherlands in May 1940 Oerip was recalled to active duty. When the Empire of Japan occupied the Indies less than two years later, Oerip was arrested and detained in a prisoner-of-war camp for three and a half months. He spent the rest of the occupation at his villa.

On 14 October 1945, several months after Indonesia proclaimed its independence, Oerip was declared the chief of general staff and acting Commander of the Indonesian National Armed Forces. Working to build a united force from the fractured former military groups in the country, Oerip received little oversight owing to irregularities in the chain of command. On 12 November 1945, lieutenant general Sudirman was selected as Commander of the Indonesian National Armed Forces, while Oerip remained as chief of general staff. The two oversaw almost three years of development during the Indonesian National Revolution, until Oerip resigned in early 1948 because of the political leadership's lack of trust in the army. His health deteriorated; he was already suffering from a weak heart, and he died of a heart attack a few months later. He was posthumously promoted to full general.

== Early life ==
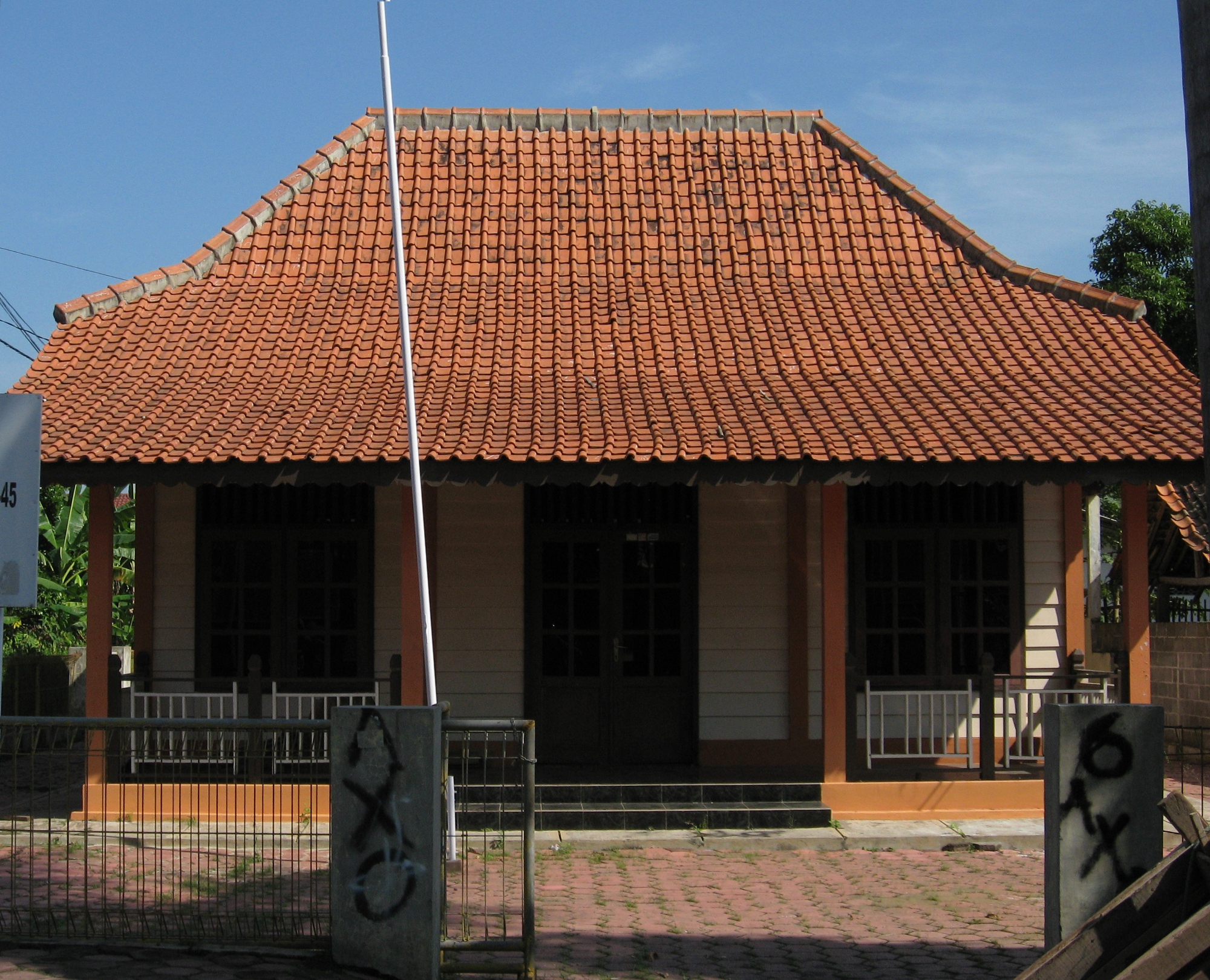
The Soemohardjo family home in Sindurjan

Oerip Soemohardjo was born Moehammad Sidik ("Little Muhammad") in his family's home in Purworejo, Dutch East Indies, on 22 February 1893. He was the first son born to Soemohardjo, a headmaster and son of a local Muslim leader, and his wife, (Note: Her name is not recorded.) the daughter of Raden Tumenggung Widjojokoesoemo, the regent of Trenggalek; the family later had two more sons, Iskandar and Soekirno, as well as three daughters. The boys were raised partly by servants, and at a young age Sidik began showing leadership qualities, commanding groups of neighbourhood children in fishing and games of football. The brothers attended the school for Javanese headed by their father, and as a result received special treatment; this led to them becoming complacent and frequently misbehaving.

In his second year of school, Sidik fell from a candlenut tree and lost consciousness. After he awoke, his mother sent a letter to Widjojokoesoemo, who decided that Sidik's name was the cause of his misbehaviour. (Note: The Javanese traditionally believed that a name that showed too high expectations could have negative effects on a child, generally making the child constantly ill. Brigadier General Slamet Rijadi had his name changed for the same reason when he was young.) In reply, Widjojokoesoemo wrote that Sidik should be renamed Oerip, which means "alive". When he recovered fully, his family decided that the newly renamed Oerip – who continued to misbehave – should study at the local Dutch School for Girls (Europese Lagere Meisjesschool); the schools for boys were full and they hoped that the girls' school would improve Oerip's skill in Dutch, the language of the regime, as well as his temperament. After a year in the girls' school, in which Oerip became calmer, he was sent to a Dutch-run school for boys. However, his academic results continued to be poor. Beginning in his final year of elementary school, he often visited his friend's father, an ex-soldier who had served in Aceh for twenty years, to listen to the old man's stories, which inspired Oerip to join the Royal Netherlands East Indies Army (Koninklijk Nederlands Indisch Leger, or KNIL).

After passing an exam for would-be state employees and several months of preparations, Oerip moved to Magelang in 1908 to attend the School for Native Government Employees (Opleidingsschool Voor Inlandse Ambtenaren, or OSVIA); his parents intended for him to become a regent like his grandfather. The following year his brothers joined him. After his mother died in 1909, Oerip sank into a months-long bout of depression and became withdrawn.

After finishing the year at OSVIA, he decided to enrol at Koninklijke Militaire Academie in Meester Cornelis, Batavia (modern-day Jatinegara, Jakarta). He went there directly from Magelang, and told his brothers to inform their father, who disapproved of his son's choice. Soemohardjo initially attempted to bribe his son with 1,000 gulden to return to OSVIA, but eventually agreed to pay for Oerip's tuition. After his training, during which he found military life enjoyable, Oerip graduated from the academy in October 1914 and became a second lieutenant in the KNIL.

== Royal Netherlands East Indies Army ==
After several days visiting his father in Purworejo, Oerip returned to Meester Cornelis where he took up a posting to Battalion XII. Even though he was the smallest man in the unit and the only native, he was placed in a position of leadership. A year and half later he was sent to Banjarmasin, Borneo. After a period patrolling the jungles outside Puruk Cahu and Muara Tewe, he was sent to Tanah Grogot, followed by Balikpapan. While stationed there Oerip was promoted to first lieutenant but faced discrimination as a native in the Dutch forces. In Banjarmasin he had convinced his commander to strike an ordinance forbidding non-Dutch officers from joining the football team, and by 1917 Oerip had received equal legal status with Dutch officers. After Balikpapan Oerip was further sent to Samarinda, Tarakan, and ultimately Malinau.

In Malinau, Oerip patrolled the border between the Dutch East Indies and the British-controlled Kingdom of Sarawak (part of modern-day Malaysia); he also worked to prevent conflicts and headhunting among Dayak tribes. One day, seven years after arriving in Borneo, Oerip returned from patrol to find his home had been burned down. Upon the recommendation of a passing doctor, Oerip went back to Java, via Tarakan and Surabaya, to Cimahi, where he spent several months in recovery from fatigue.

Fully recovered, in 1923 Oerip was stationed in his hometown, Purworejo. In September 1925 Oerip was transferred to Magelang to serve in the Maréchaussée te Voet (Foot Marshalry), a gendarmerie. Initially known to avoid women and under pressure to marry quickly, in Magelang Oerip became involved with Rohmah Soebroto, the daughter of his former Javanese and Malay language teacher Soebroto and a distant relative of female emancipation figure Kartini. The pair were engaged on 7 May 1926 and married on 30 June of the same year. Also in Magelang, Oerip took on his father's name, which he used as a family name for dealing with the Dutch. (Note: Family names were required by Dutch civil code for things such as land purchase.) Afterwards he began referring to himself by the full name of Oerip Soemohardjo, although others continued to call him Oerip.

The year after his marriage, Oerip and his wife were stationed in Ambarawa, where Oerip was tasked with rebuilding a previously disbanded unit. While training local recruits in place of the Dutch commander who had yet to arrive, Oerip was promoted to captain. After the Dutch commander arrived, in July 1928 Oerip was given a year's leave, which he used to travel throughout Europe on a sightseeing trip with his wife. Upon his return to the Indies, he was stationed at Meester Cornelis.

In Meester Cornelis, Oerip began running training exercises; while stationed in Batavia, his father died. In 1933, he was sent to Padang Panjang in Sumatra to deal with unrest that had already killed several Dutch officers. His time in Padang Panjang passed uneventfully, and in July 1935 he was given leave to go to Europe again. He was also promoted to major at that time, which made him the highest-ranking native officer in the KNIL. The following year, upon his return to the Indies, he was stationed in Purworejo. In mid-1938, after a disagreement with the local regent, (Note: The regent was refused entry to a gala celebrating the anniversary of Queen Wilhelmina's coronation.) Oerip was told to transfer to Gombong; he refused, then left the KNIL and moved to his parents-in-law's home in Yogyakarta.

== Civilian life and Japanese occupation ==
In Yogyakarta, the unemployed Oerip took up orchid gardening. Soon after arriving, he and his wife bought a villa in Gentan, north of the city. Although the villa was small, the couple used its 2 hectares (4.9 acres) of land to open a large flower garden, with their income subsidised by Oerip's pension from the KNIL. At his villa, named KEM (for Klaarheid en Moed, or "Purity and Bravery"), Oerip often received guests, both military and civilian, from whom he received information about current events and to whom he gave advice regarding military matters and politics. In 1940, the pair adopted a four-year-old Dutch girl named Abby from an orphanage in Semarang.

Shortly thereafter, on 10 May 1940, when Nazi Germany invaded the Netherlands, Oerip was recalled to active service. Three days after reporting to Colonel Pik in Magelang, he went to the KNIL headquarters in Bandung, where he was the first retired officer to report. Afterwards, he and his family – who had joined him – were transferred to Cimahi, where Oerip was tasked with establishing a new battalion depot. Several native officers were stationed in northern parts of the Indies during 1941 in preparation for an expected attack by the Empire of Japan, although Oerip stayed in Cimahi.

After the Japanese occupied the Indies in early 1942, Oerip was held in a mixed prisoner of war camp in Cimahi. Upon his release three and a half months later, Oerip refused an offer to form a new, Japanese-backed police force and returned to KEM, where he and his wife rented paddy fields to grow rice while continuing to operate their flower garden. To protect their land, they surrounded their property and home with a high bamboo fence. Although no longer active in the military, Oerip occasionally received former KNIL members, including Abdul Haris Nasution and Sunarmo, who brought news of events outside the village. The couple continued their work, harassed and surveilled by the Japanese and pro-Japanese Indonesians, until the bombings of Hiroshima and Nagasaki in early August 1945 signified that Japan would soon withdraw. It was during this period that Oerip began having heart problems.

== Indonesian National Revolution and death ==
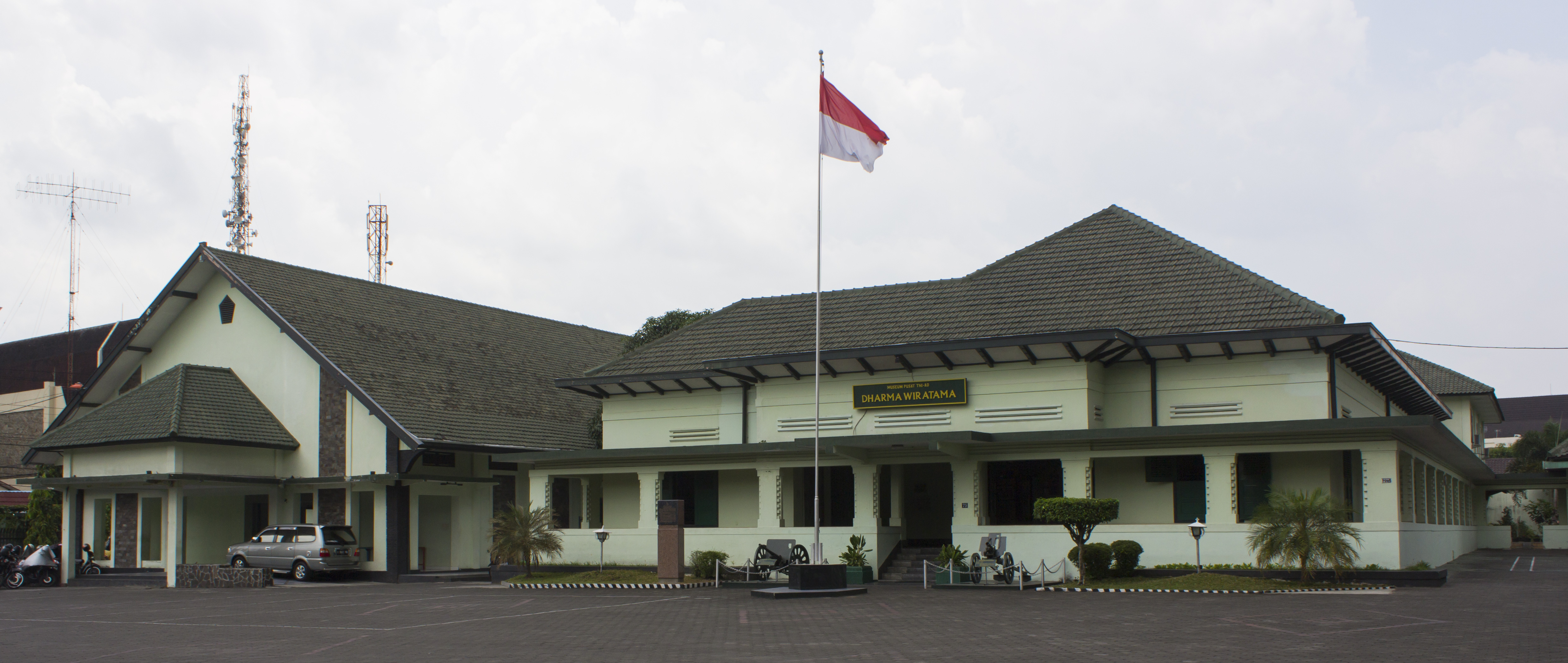
The first dedicated TKR headquarters, in Gondokusuman, Yogyakarta; it is now the Dharma Wiratama Museum.

After the Proclamation of Indonesian Independence on 17 August 1945, Oerip and his family left KEM for Rohma's parents' home in Yogyakarta. When the People's Safety Body (Badan Keamanan Rakjat, or BKR) was formed on 23 August, Oerip led a group of military commanders who petitioned for it to be set up as a national military formation; a separate group, led by politician Oto Iskandar di Nata, wanted the BKR to fulfil the functions of a police organisation. The political leadership, consisting of President Sukarno and Vice President Mohammad Hatta, agreed to a compromise: it became a police-style organisation, but most of its members had served in the military, either with the Defenders of the Homeland (PETA; Pembela Tanah Air) or the Heiho.

On 14 October 1945 – nine days after the Indonesian National Armed Forces was formally established – Oerip was declared its Chief of General Staff and left immediately for Jakarta. (Note: Batavia was renamed Jakarta after the Japanese invasion.) In a cabinet meeting the following day, he was ordered to build a national army, headquartered in Yogyakarta, (Note: Oerip had originally suggested using Purwokerto for his headquarters, but ultimately Yogyakarta was chosen as it had better facilities and guaranteed support from the local ruler.) in preparation for an expected assault by Dutch troops coming to reclaim the Indies. He departed for Yogyakarta on 16 October, and arrived the following day. He first established the headquarters in a room at Hotel Merdeka, which he used until the Sultan of Yogyakarta Hamengkubuwono IX donated land and a building for the army to use.

With the BKR scattered under independent leadership throughout the country, the newly formed People's Security Army (Tentara Keamaanan Rakjat or TKR, now known as the Tentara Nasional Indonesia) drew officers mainly from the native members of the former KNIL. However, these officers were poorly received by Indonesian nationalists, who viewed them as mercenaries for having served in the Dutch forces. Meanwhile, rank and file members of the TKR were drawn from numerous groups, including former PETA, current Pemuda (young Indonesian revolutionaries), and the BKR. Although Oerip set out a command structure, in reality the army's hierarchy was provisional and depended heavily on the strength of local units.

Following a government decree on 20 October Oerip became subordinate to both the acting Minister of Defence Soeljoadikoesoemo and Commander in Chief of the Armed Forces Soeprijadi. However, neither man showed up to assume his duties. Soeprijadi, a PETA soldier who had led an uprising against Japanese forces in Blitar in February 1945, was thought dead. (Note: The historian Amrin Imran suggests that Soeprijadi's appointment may have been a way to see if he was still alive; it may have been thought that he would have certainly contacted the government in Jakarta to take over this post if he were.) While Soeljohadikosomo's position remained unfilled, the guerrilla leader Moestopo declared himself Minister of Defence. As such, Oerip had little oversight and felt pressured to quickly establish a stable command structure. On 2 November, he appointed leaders for military operations in various parts of the country: Didi Kartasasmita for western Java, Soeratman for central Java, Mohammad for eastern Java, and Soehardjo Hardjowardojo for Sumatra; each of these sub-commanders was given the rank of major general. Oerip also began appropriating weapons to different TKR commands. He took confiscated Japanese weapons from well-equipped forces and distributed them as needed. However, the results were less successful than he had hoped. PETA had been organised locally during the Japanese occupation, and as such its members were unable to accept a centralised leadership.

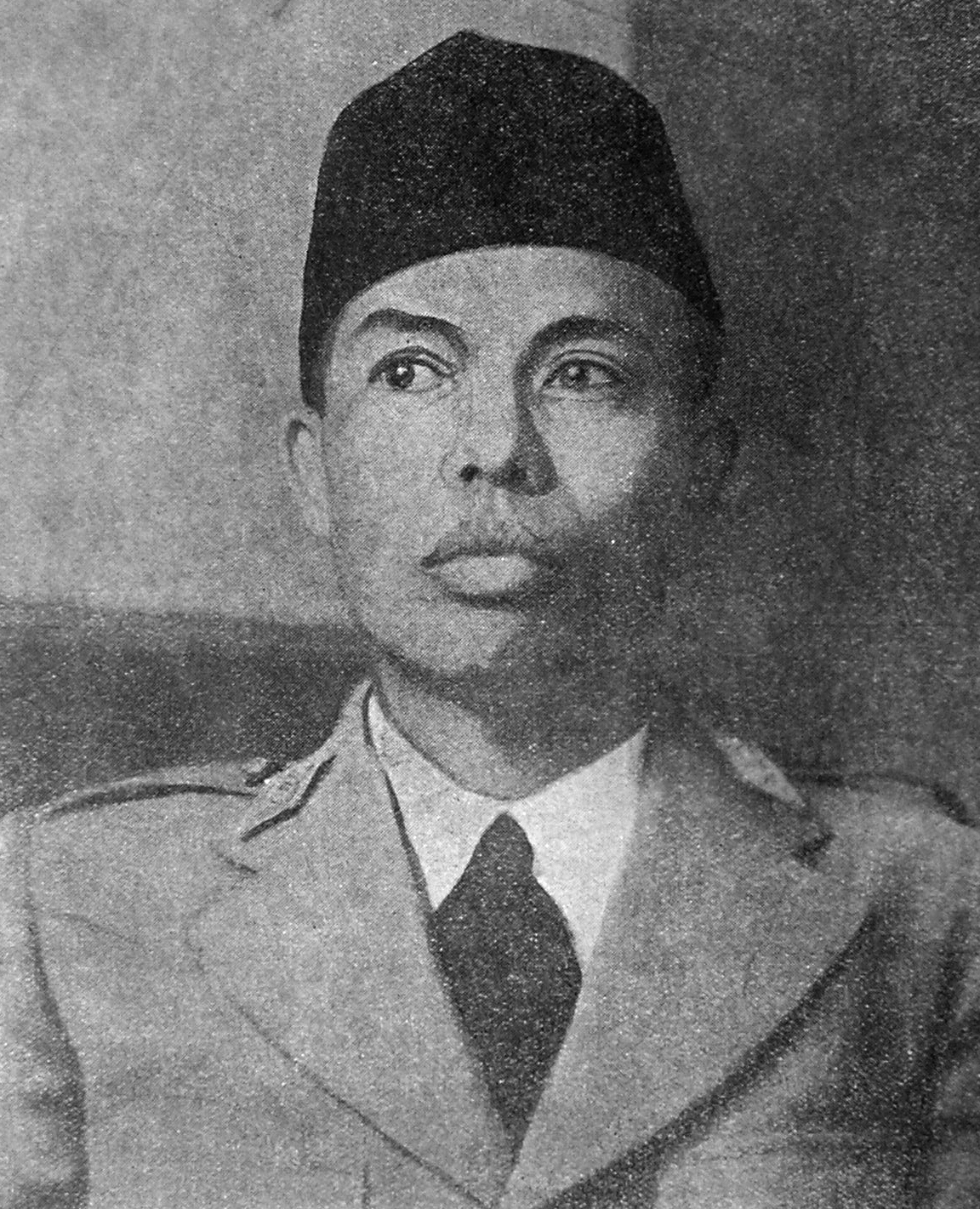
Lieutenant General Sudirman was elected as leader of the TKR on 12 November 1945. He kept Oerip as his chief of general staff.

On 12 November 1945, at the first general meeting of army leadership, Lieutenant General Sudirman – the leader of the Fifth Division in Purwokerto, who had two years military experience and was 23 years younger than Oerip – was elected leader of the army following two deadlocked votes. In the third round, Oerip had 21 votes to Sudirman's 22. Divisional commanders from Sumatra, who had voted unanimously, swayed the vote in Sudirman's favour; Oerip had lost votes because some of the division leaders distrusted his history with the KNIL and the oath he had taken to the Dutch motherland upon graduation. Although Sudirman was surprised at his selection and offered to surrender the leadership position to Oerip, the meeting did not allow it; Oerip himself was glad to no longer be in charge of the army. Sudirman kept Oerip, by then a lieutenant general, to serve as chief of general staff under him. While Sudirman remained unconfirmed, Oerip remained de jure leader; however, the Indonesian journalist Salim Said writes that Oerip's orders were at times unintelligible owing to the leader's poor command of Indonesian and often ignored unless approved by Sudirman. (Note: Oerip was fluent in Dutch and Javanese, but had a poor command of Indonesian, which had gained mainstream currency in the early 20th century.)

When Lieutenant General Sudirman was approved on 18 December, he began working to consolidate and unite the army. Meanwhile, Oerip handled day-to-day organisational and technical issues. Many of the details, such as company uniforms, he left to regional commanders. (Note: At the time, the Indonesian National Armed Forces did not have the resources to enforce a standard uniform nationwide.) However, to deal with more important issues, such as establishing a military police and preventing enemy paratroopers from landing, he passed edicts that applied nationally.

Together, Sudirman and Oerip were able to address many of the differences between former KNIL and PETA troops. The government also renamed the army twice in January 1946, first to the People's Safety Army (Tentara Keselamatan Rakjat), then to the Republic of Indonesia Military Forces(Tentara Repoeblik Indonesia, or TRI). On 23 February 1946, Oerip was appointed head of the 11-member Committee to Reorganise the Army (Panitia Besar Reorganisasi Tentara), formed by presidential decree. After four months of discussion, on 17 May the committee gave its recommendations to Sukarno. Oerip was set to handle day-to-day operations of a downsized army, while the Ministry of Defence was given greater bureaucratic power. Sudirman was kept as commander of the young armed forces.

As Minister of Defence Amir Sjarifuddin began establishing pro-leftist groups within the military, Oerip became distrustful of the political leadership and vehemently decried the government's attempts to use soldiers' political affiliations to control the military. Still, he and Sudirman continued to work to ensure that paramilitary troops (laskar), which had arisen from the general populace, were included in the military. This was realised on 3 June 1947, when the government declared the union of the laskar and TRI into a new military organisation, the Indonesian National Armed Forces (Tentara Nasional Indonesia, or TNI). Meanwhile, Oerip established a military academy in Yogyakarta.

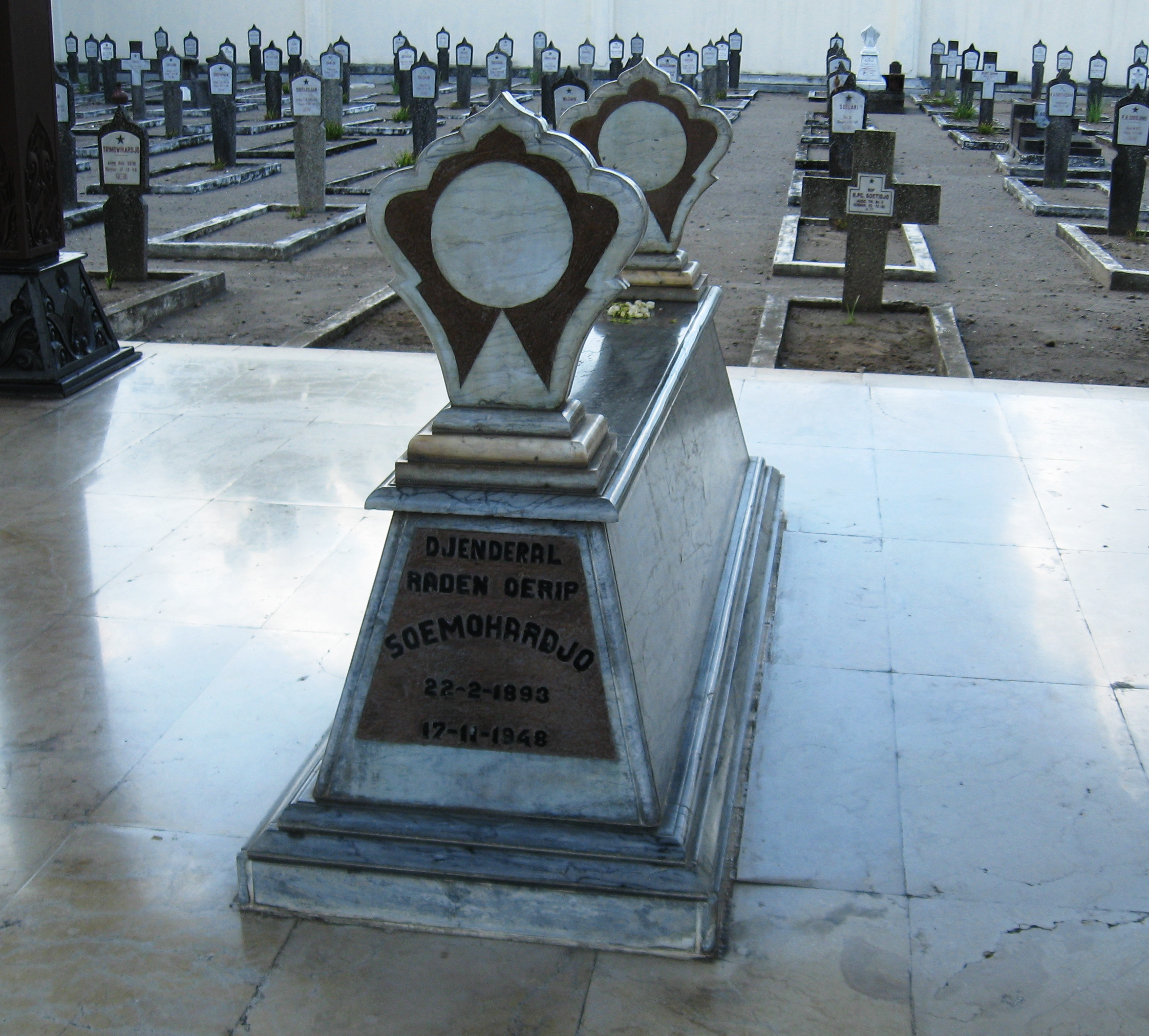
Oerip's grave in Yogyakarta

To meet the Dutch threat, Oerip intended to attack while the former colonists were still consolidating their forces, a plan that was quashed by the government's attempts at diplomacy. He preferred guerrilla tactics to formal military conflicts, once telling a subordinate that the best attack would be one with a hundred snipers hidden behind enemy lines. Oerip was strongly against the Renville Agreement, an ultimately unsuccessful treaty that led to the withdrawal of 35,000 troops from western Java and the formalisation of the Van Mook Line between Dutch and Indonesian forces. He saw the agreement, ratified on 17 January 1948, as a stalling tactic, giving the Dutch the chance to strengthen their forces. Meanwhile, Amir Sjarifuddin – by then also serving as prime minister – began culling the army, predominantly keeping leftist-leaning troops. Disgusted with what he perceived as the government's lack of trust in the military, Oerip tendered his resignation, although he continued to serve as an advisor to the Minister of Defence, Vice President Hatta. (Note: Sjariffudin had been forced to resign over general disapproval of the Renville Agreement.)

After several months of growing steadily weaker and undergoing treatment from Dr Sim Ki Ay, on the evening of 17 November 1948 Oerip collapsed and died from a heart attack in his room in Yogyakarta. After a night-long viewing he was buried the next day in Semaki Heroes' Cemetery and posthumously promoted to general. When Sudirman threatened to resign in 1949, he blamed Oerip's death – as well as his own tuberculosis – on the government's inconsistency during the revolution. Oerip was survived by his wife and adopted daughter. Abby died of malaria in January 1951, and Rohmah died on 29 October 1977 in Semarang; she was buried in Ungaran.

== Legacy ==
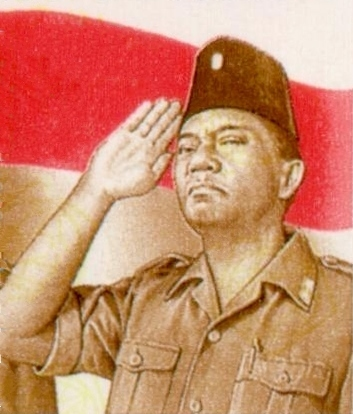
Oerip on a 1993 Indonesian stamp

Oerip received numerous awards from the national government posthumously, including the Bintang Sakti (1959), Bintang Mahaputera (1960), Bintang Republik Indonesia Adipurna (1967), and Bintang Kartika Eka Pakçi Utama (1968). (Note: The Bintang Sakti is a high-level military award for showing bravery above and beyond the call of duty. The Bintang Mahaputera is a high-level award for persons who have aided Indonesia's development, become experts in a certain field, or are widely recognised for their sacrifices for the country. The Bintang Republik Indonesia is the highest award available for civilians; only eight persons have received the Adipurna class. The Bintang Kartika Eka Pakçi Utama is a low-level military award for aiding the development of the army above and beyond the call of duty; Utama is the highest class.) On 10 December 1964 he was declared a National Hero of Indonesia through Presidential Decree 314 of 1964. Sudirman was also declared a National Hero by the same decree.

On 22 February 1964 the Indonesian military academy in Magelang dedicated a memorial to him, which described the military leader as "a son of Indonesia who valued work over words, who prioritised his Duty over his wants." (Note: Original: "seorang putra Indonesia yang mengagungkan karya daripada kata, yang mengutamakan Dharma daripada minta.") During Christmas 1964, Justinus Darmojuwono, who was the Military Ordinary of Indonesia and the Archbishop of Semarang at the time (later became the first Indonesian to be a Cardinal), returned from the Vatican. He brought a chalice dedicated for Oerip from Pope Paul VI inscribed "In memorium ducis militum, Benedicti Oerip Soemohardjo, Pro aede sacra, Academiae militaris, Indonesianae, D.D., Anno MCMLXIV". Since 1965, the chalice has been kept in the Catholic chapel of the Indonesian military academy in Magelang, which also includes a dedication to him prompted by a discussion between Rohmah (Oerip's wife) and a missionary friend of hers. Several streets are named after Oerip, including in his hometown of Purworejo, nearby Yogyakarta, and the capital at Jakarta.
