= Grand general (Indonesia) =

Grand general Jenderal Besar
- Shoulder insignia
- Country: Indonesia
- Service branch: Indonesian Army
- Rank group: General officer
- Rank: Five-star rank
- Formation: 1997
- Abolished: 2010
- Next lower rank: Jenderal
- Equivalent ranks: Laksamana besar (Navy); Marsekal besar (Air force)

Grand general (Indonesian: jenderal besar), was the highest rank of the Indonesian Army. It was the equivalent of grand admiral (laksamana besar) and grand marshal (marsekal besar) within the Indonesian Armed Forces ranking system. These ranks were honorary and did not confer additional authority or responsibility.

== History ==
The rank has been only awarded to three individuals, all in 1997, during the 52nd year anniversary of the Indonesian National Armed Forces.

- Sudirman, also styled Grand Commander (panglima besar), the 1st commander of the armed forces during the war of independence and a national hero. The rank was granted posthumously.
- Abdul Haris Nasution, a national hero, twice appointed chief of staff of the army, and a survivor of an assassination attempt in the 1965 coup attempt.
- Suharto, the second President of Indonesia. The rank was bestowed during his presidency.

As Government Regulation No. 32/1997, which established this rank, was revoked and replaced by Government Regulation No. 39/2010, which no longer includes the five-star rank. Consequently, the rank may not be awarded anymore.

In January 2014, General Moeldoko, then serving as Commander of the National Armed Forces, briefly suggested awarding the rank to outgoing President Susilo Bambang Yudhoyono due to the latter's efforts in modernizing the military. Former service members sitting in parliament firmly rejected the suggestion, citing the aforementioned regulation, and in any case, Yudhoyono himself, while appreciating Moeldoko's gesture, ultimately refused to take the award, with Minister of the State Secretariat Sudi Silalahi stating that the aforementioned efforts by Yudhoyono have since become a standard presidential duty.
