= Supeno =

Indonesian politician (1916–1949)

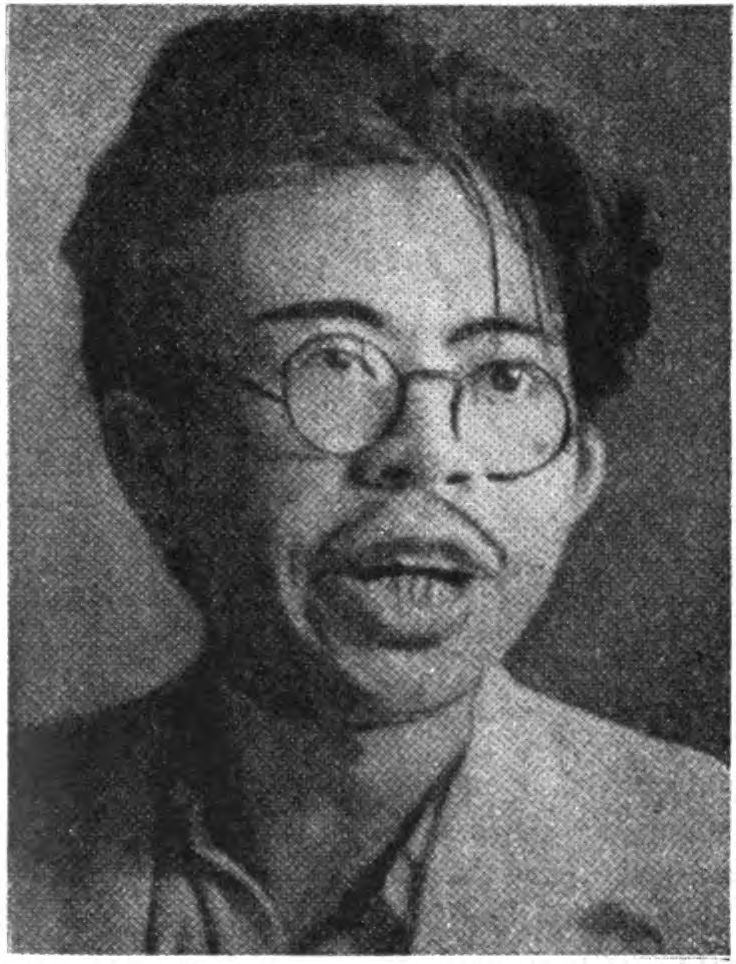
- Portrait, c. 1940s

2nd Minister of Development and Youth Affairs
- In office 29 January 1948 – 24 February 1949
- Prime Minister: Mohammad Hatta
- Preceded by: Wikana
- Succeeded by: Maladi

Chairman of the Central Indonesian National Committee
- In office 14 November 1945 – 28 February 1947
- Preceded by: Sutan Sjahrir
- Succeeded by: Assaat

Personal details
- Born: 12 June 1916 Pekalongan, Central Java, Dutch East Indies
- Died: 24 February 1949 (aged 32) Gander Village, Ngliman Village, Sawahan Sub-District, Nganjuk Regency, East Java, Indonesia

Supeno (12 June 1916 – 24 February 1949) was the Minister of Development/Youth in the First Hatta Cabinet of Indonesia. He died while still serving in the department as a result of the Dutch Military Aggression II. Supeno is now regarded as a National Hero of Indonesia.

== Life and career ==
Supeno was born in Pekalongan, Central Java, on 12 June 1916. He was the son of an officer of the Tegal Station Soemarno. Accessed After graduating from High school (AMS) in Semarang, she went to Technical High School (Technische Hogeschool) in Bandung. Only two years old, studying in school it's because he moved to the High School of Law (Recht Hogeschool) in Jakarta. In the city, staying in hostels Soepeno Assembly of Students Indonesia (RMIC) in Jalan Cikini Raya 71. Therefore, his colleagues, he was selected as the head of the hostel.

Supeno was appointed Minister of Youth and Sports in the First Hatta Cabinet.

== Death ==
When the Dutch invaded Indonesia on 19 December 1948, the Minister of Youth and Supeno RI Development. Supeno joined a guerrilla force, while the Dutch soldiers continue to track him down. Several months after joining the guerrilla, Supeno and his party were finally caught at Ganter Village, Nganjuk, when the Dutch invaded the territory on the 24 February 1949. After he was caught, the Dutch forced him to squat as they interrogated.

Supeno was then buried in Nganjuk. A year later, his tomb was transferred to TMP Semaki, Yogyakarta.

Preceded by Wikana	Indonesian Minister of Youth and Sports; 1948-1949	Succeeded by Maladi
