= Indonesian National Police =

National police force of Indonesia

Indonesian National Police Kepolisian Negara Republik Indonesia
- Insignia of the National Police

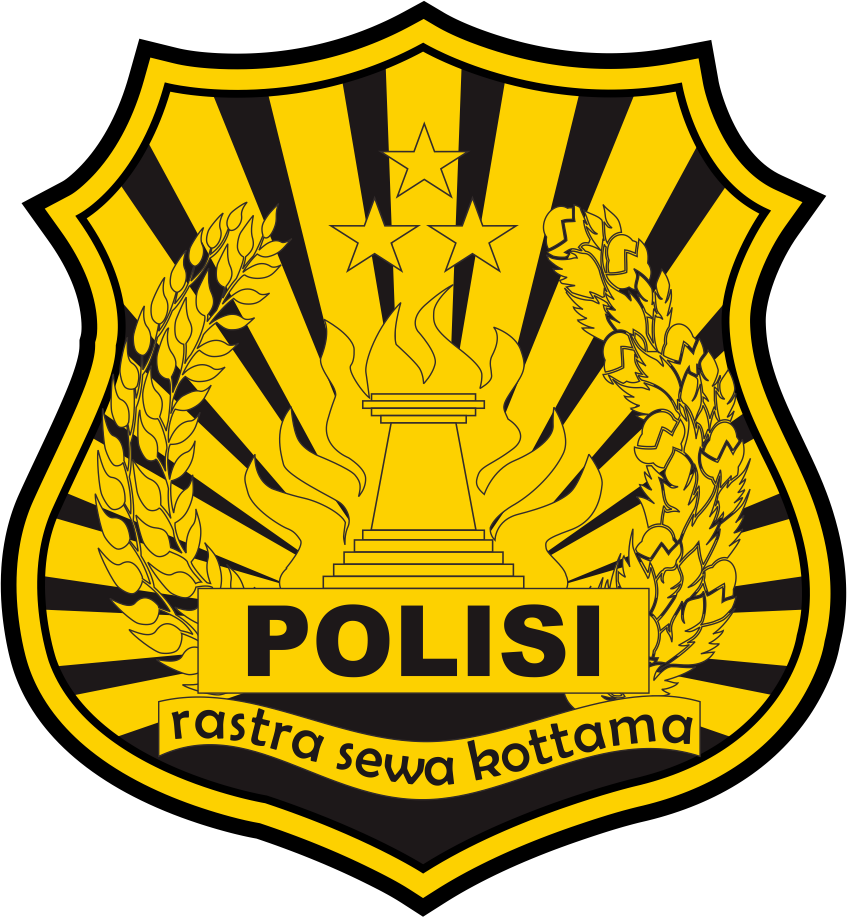
- National Police badge

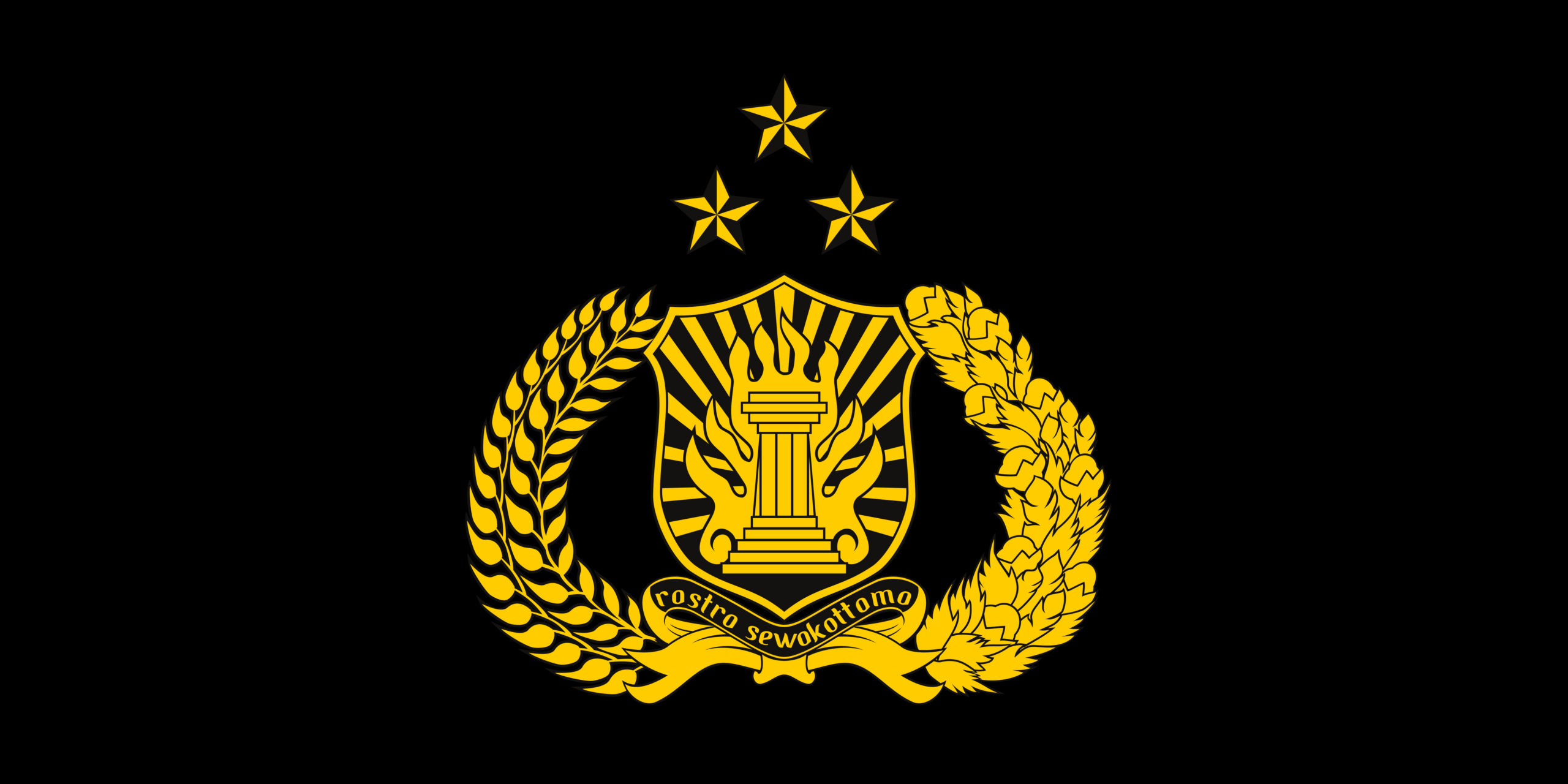
- Flag of the National Police
- Abbreviation: POLRI
- Motto: Rastra Sewakottama (Sanskrit); Serving the Nation

Agency overview
- Formed: 19 August 1945; 81 years ago (as State Police Agency); 1 July 1946; 80 years ago (official anniversary)
- Employees: 440,000 (2020)
- Legal personality: Police force

Jurisdictional structure
- National agency (Operations jurisdiction): Indonesia
- Operations jurisdiction: Indonesia
- Legal jurisdiction: National
- Constituting instrument: Act No. 2 of 2002 on the State Police of the Republic of Indonesia, as amended by the 2023 Omnibus Law on Job Creation
- General nature: Civilian police

Operational structure
- Headquarters: Kebayoran Baru, South Jakarta
- Agency executives: Pol. Gen. Suyudi Ario Seto, Chief of the Indonesian National Police; Pol. Com. Gen. Dedi Prasetyo, Deputy Chief of the Indonesian National Police

Notables
- Anniversary: 1 July

Website
- www.polri.go.id

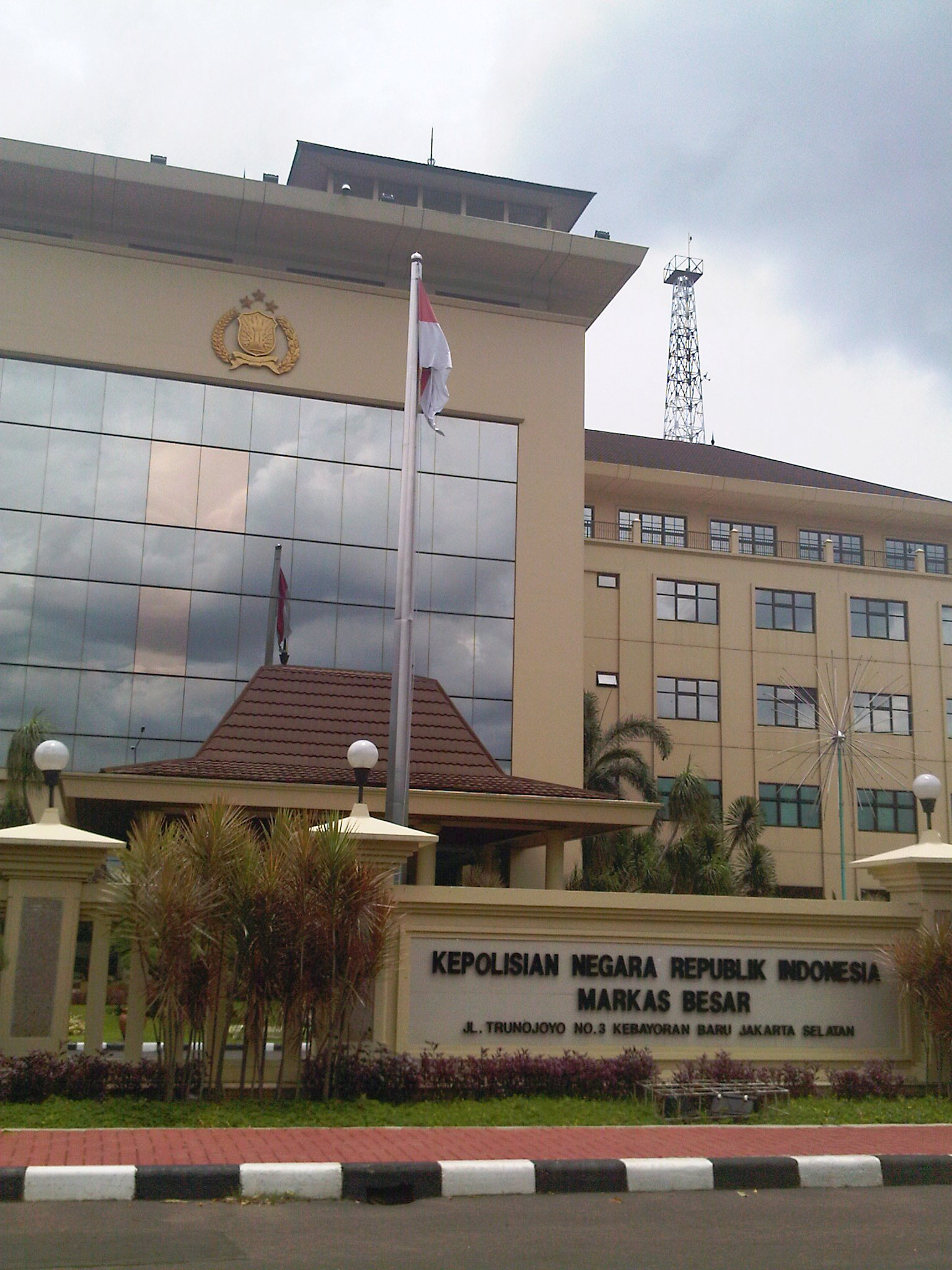
Indonesian National Police headquarters (Mabes Polri) in Kebayoran Baru, South Jakarta

The Indonesian National Police (Indonesian: Kepolisian Negara Republik Indonesia, lit. 'State Police of the Republic of Indonesia', abbreviated as POLRI) is the national law enforcement and police force of the Republic of Indonesia. Founded on 19 August 1945 and became an independent agency on 1 July 1946, it was formerly a branch of the country's military after 1962. The police were formally separated from the armed forces on 1 April 1999, in a process which was formally completed on 1 July 1999.

The total personnel that the Indonesian National Police possesses in 2020 is 440,000, and the number is increasing every year, it includes 34,000 Brimob personnel, with up-to 7,000 water and aviation police personnel. Polri is also assisted by an estimated 1,7 million members of Senkom Mitra Polri volunteers throughout the country which are civilians that assist the police. The headquarters of the Indonesian National Police is located in Kebayoran Baru, South Jakarta and the Indonesian National Police emergency number is 110 which serves all over Indonesia 24 hours. The Indonesian National Police also takes part in international United Nations missions, and, after special training, provided security for the UNAMID mission to protect internally-displaced people in Darfur.

The organization is under the direct auspices of the President of Indonesia. The Indonesian National Police is responsible for law enforcement and policing duties all over Indonesia. The organization has a history of corruption, violence, and incompetence.

== History ==
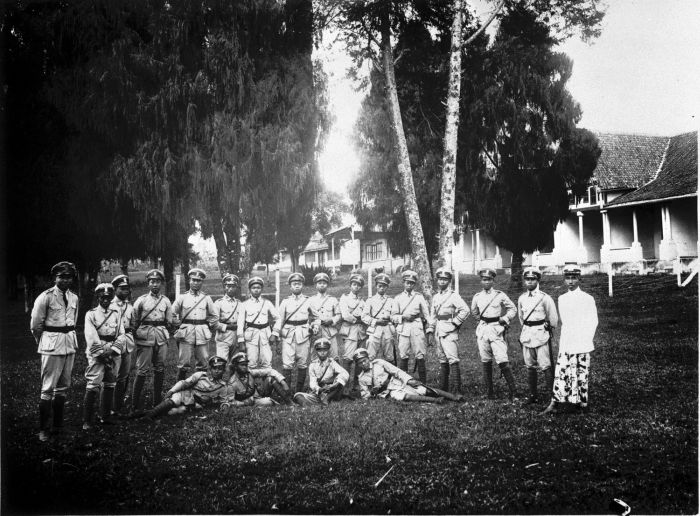
The Veldpolitie in Malang (c. 1930)

While Indonesia was under Dutch colonial rule, police duties were performed either by military establishments or the colonial police, known as the Veldpolitie or field police. Japanese occupation during World War II brought changes when the Japanese formed various armed organisations to support their war effort. This led to militarily-trained youths being armed with confiscated Dutch arms to perform police duties.

After the Japanese occupation, the national police became an armed organization. The Indonesian police was established on 19 August 1945 (under the title of the National Police Agency (Badan Kepolisian Negara)) and its units fought in the Indonesian National Revolution against the invading Dutch forces. The police would later be renamed the National Police Service (Djawatan Kepolisian Negara) under the Ministry of Home Affairs and on 1 June 1946, it became an independent agency under the prime minister. The police also participated in suppressing the 1948 communist revolt in Madiun. In 1962, the police was brought under the control of the Commander of the National Armed Forces and the Ministry of Defence, becoming the Indonesian Police Forces (Angkatan Kepolisian). Following the proclamation of independence, the police played a vital role when they actively supported the people's movement toa dismantle the Japanese army, and to strengthen the defence of the newly created Republic of Indonesia. The police were one of the non-combatants who were required to surrender their weapons to the Allied forces. During the Indonesian National Revolution, the police gradually formed into what is now known as Kepolisian Negara Republik Indonesia (Polri) or the Indonesian National Police. On 21 June 1962, the National Police was integrated under the Armed Forces (ABRI) and changed its name to Angkatan Kepolisian (Police Force), and its commander maintained the concurrent status of Minister of Defense and Security, reporting to the President, who is commander in chief. The commanding generals (later chiefs of staff) and the Chief of the National Police then all held ministerial status as members of the cabinet of the republic, while a number of higher-ranking officers were appointed to other cabinet posts. On 1 July 1969, the Police Force's name was reverted to "Polri". In April 1999, the police force officially regained its independence and since then has been a separate force from the armed forces proper.

1 July, which became National Police Day (Hari Bhayangkara), honours the anniversary of the 1946 Cabinet resolution placing the INP as a national agency subordinated directly to the government of the Republic and thus responsible to the President (formerly the Prime Minister).

== Duties and tasks ==
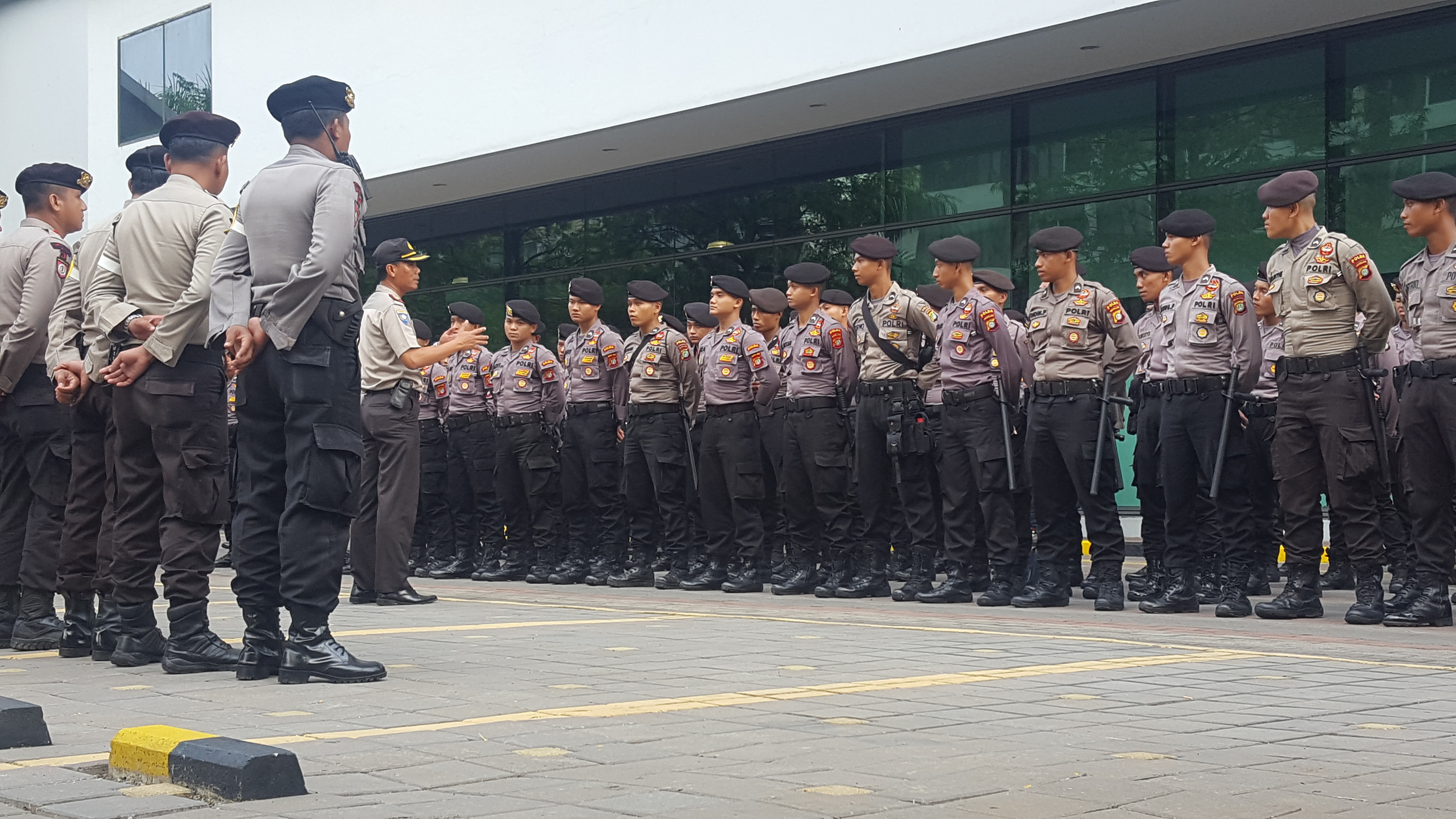
Indonesian police personnel in Jakarta

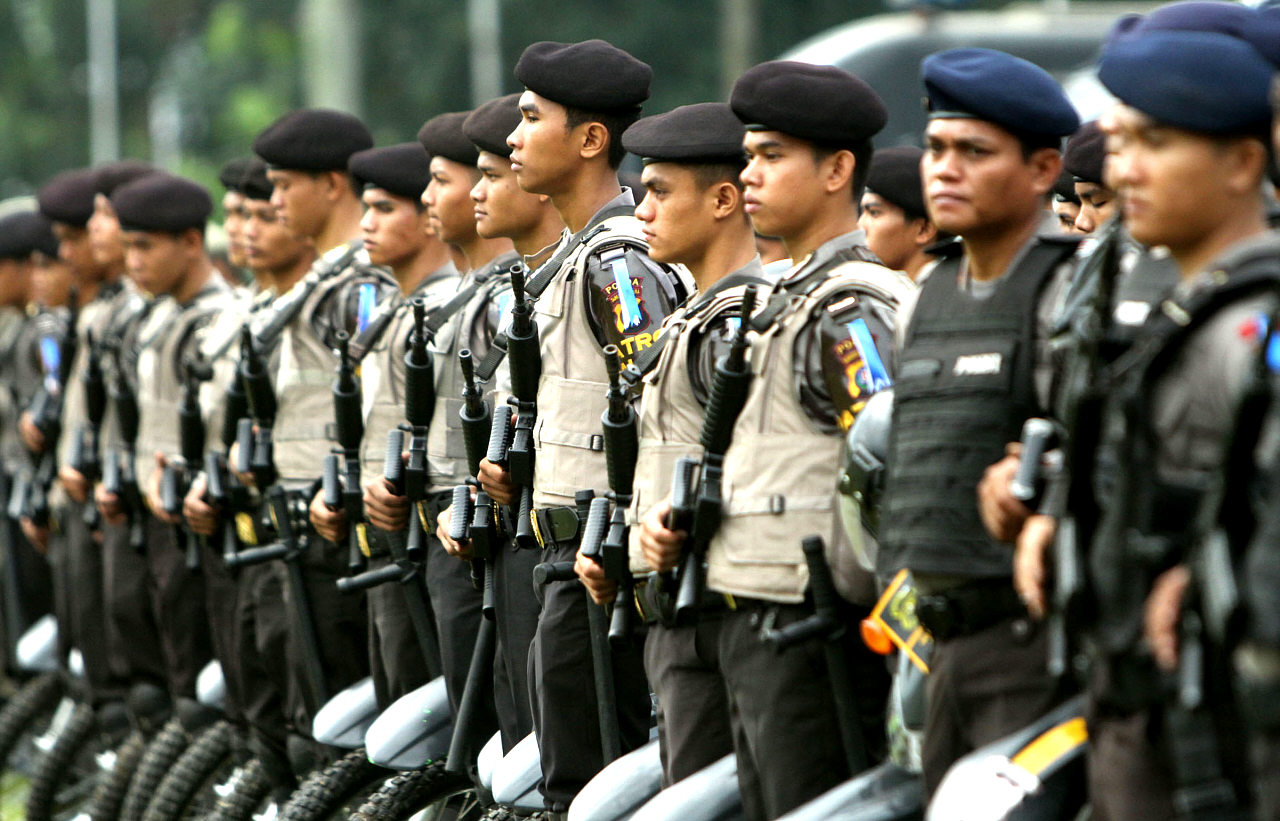
Armed Indonesian police officers and personnel line-up in Jakarta

The key tasks of the Indonesian National Police are to:

- maintain security and public order;
- enforce the law, and
- provide protection, and service to the community.

In carrying out these basic tasks, police are to:

- perform control, guard, escort and patrol of the community and government activities as needed;
- supply all activities to ensure the safety and smoothness of vehicular traffic on every kind of roadway,
- develop community awareness in the development of national law;
- implement order and ensure public safety;
- implement co-ordination, supervision, and technical guidance to the investigators, civil servants/authorities, and the forms of private security;
- implement the investigation against all criminal acts in accordance with the criminal procedure law and other legislation;
- implement identification such as police medical operations, psychology, and police forensic laboratory for the interests of the tasks set by the service,
- protect soul safety, property, society, and the environment from disturbances and/or disaster, including providing aid and relief to uphold human rights;
- serve interests of citizens for a while before it is handled by the agency and/or authorities;
- give services to the public in accordance with the interests of the police task environment;
- implement other duties in accordance with the Constitution and legislative acts, which in practice are regulated by Government Regulation;
- receive reports and/or complaints;
- perform crowd and public control;
- help resolve community disputes that may interfere with the public order;
- supervise the flow that can lead to the dismemberment or threaten the unity of the nation;
- publicise police regulations within the scope of police administrative authority;
- implement special examination as part of the police identification;
- respond first and rapid action to a scene;
- take the identity, fingerprints and photograph of a person for identification purposes;
- look for information and evidence;
- organise National Crime Information Centre;
- issue licence and / or certificate that is required to service the community;
- give security assistance in the trial and execution of court decisions, the activities of other agencies, as well as community activities; and
- receive, secure, and keep lost items located and found for a while until further identification

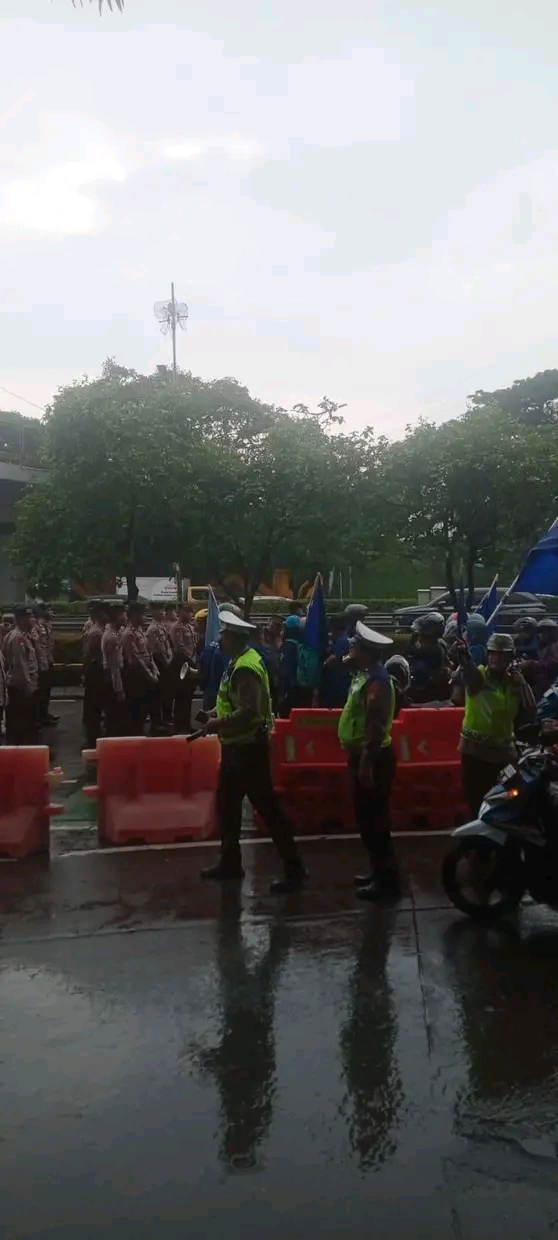
Indonesian National Police members overseeing demonstration in Senayan, Kebayoran Baru, South Jakarta

== Hierarchy ==
The organization of the Indonesian National Police is hierarchical, headed by the POLRI general headquarters in Kebayoran Baru. There is no differentiation between the central organization with its regional components.

- Regional Police Force (Kepolisian Daerah, Polda) which covers an entire province and is headed by a two-star police general (Police Inspector). It was formerly known as Police Commissariats (Kepolisian Komisariat) and Regional Police Commands (Komando Daerah Kepolisan, Komdak).
- Resort/Departmental Police Force (Kepolisian Resor, Polres) which covers a city or regency and is usually headed by a police officer holding the rank of Police Chief Commissioner for urban areas and a Police Deputy Chief Commissioner for rural areas. It was formerly known as Resort/Departmental Police Commands (Komando Resor Kepolisian).
- Sectoral Police Force (Kepolisian Sektor, Polsek) which covers a district and is usually headed by a police officer holding the rank of Police Commissioner for urban areas and a Police Deputy Commissioner for rural areas. Meanwhile, in Papua there are Polseks which are headed by officers with lesser ranks, such as Police Inspectors.
  - Community Police Officers (Bhayangkara Pembina Keamanan dan Ketertiban Masyarakat, abbreviated Bhabinkamtibmas, lit. 'Public Security and Order Supervising Officer') are senior NCOs/Sub-Inspectors of Police officers which are coordinated under the Sectoral Police office. They are tasked in mentoring, supervising, and maintaining law and order in a particular smaller community which usually covers an urban village and/or a rural village (desa). They are identified by their yellow brassard printed "BHABINKAMTIBMAS" and are tasked to monitor local community activities such as during elections and/or other community gathering occasions.

Until 2010, there was also a police force division called Territorial Police Force (Kepolisian Wilayah, Polwil, formerly Komando Wilayah Kepolisian, Komwik) positioned between Polda and Polres. Polwils' divisions were based on Dutch East Indian residencies. The legacy of Polwils remain on the vehicle code on Indonesian vehicle registration plates.

== Organization ==
=== Leadership ===
- Chief of the Indonesian National Police (Kepala Kepolisian Negara Republik Indonesia, abbreviated Kapolri). He is appointed by and answerable only to the President of Indonesia; and
- Deputy Chief of the Indonesian National Police (Wakil Kepala Kepolisian Negara Republik Indonesia, abbreviated Wakapolri), who assists the Chief in managing the administration of the Police, representing the Chief in official duties, as well as executing other orders by the Chief.

=== Support elements ===
Inspectorate

- General Inspectorate of the National Police (Inspektorat Pengawasan Umum), tasked with assisting the Chief in the implementation of supervision as well as conducting general inspection and treasury within the National Police including non-structural organizational units under the control of chief of national police.

Assistants to the Chief of Police

- Assistant to the Chief of Police for Operations (Asisten Kapolri Bidang Operasi), tasked with assisting the Chief of Police in the implementation of operational management functions within the police environment including external coordination and cooperation as well as community empowerment and other POLRI auxiliary elements.
- Assistant to the Chief of Police for General Planning and Budget (Asisten Kapolri Bidang Perencanaan Umum dan Anggaran), tasked to assist the Chief of Police in the implementation of general planning and budgetary functions, including the development of organizational and management systems and research and development within the Indonesian national police.
- Assistant to the Chief of Police for Human Resources (Asisten Kapolri Bidang Sumber Daya Manusia), tasked with assisting the Chief of Police in the implementation of human resources management functions, including efforts to maintain and improve the welfare of personnel within the Indonesian national police.
- Assistant to the Chief of Police for Law Enforcement Facilities and Infrastructure (Asisten Kapolri Bidang Sarana dan Prasarana), tasked with assisting the Chief of Police in the implementation of the function of facilities and infrastructure within the National Police.
- Assistant to the Chief of Police for Logistics (Asisten Kapolri Bidang Logistik) tasked with assisting the Chief of Police in the implementation of Police logistical efforts.

Divisions

- Professional and Security Division (Divisi Profesi dan Pengamanan) is the special staffing element in the field of professional accountability and internal security. This division acts as the internal affairs of the Police Force, in charge of enforcement of discipline and law and order of police personnel.
- Legal Division (Divisi Hukum) serves as the legal office for the Chief of Police, tasked with the provision of legal research, legal support, legal advices, legal development, legal guidance, and human rights support within the Police Force.
- Public Affairs and Press Division (Divisi Hubungan Masyarakat) tasked with maintaining the public image and relations of the Police Force, as well as providing publicly-accessible Police data, information, and documentations.
- International Relations Division (Divisi Hubungan Internasional) is an assistant element of international relations leadership that is under the Chief of Police. This section also oversees the Indonesian National Crime Bureau Interpol, to deal with transnational crimes.
- Police Information Technology Division (Divisi Teknologi Informasi Kepolisian), is a supporting element in the field of informatics which includes information technology and electronic communications.

Advisory Staff

The Advisory Staff to the Chief of Police (Staf Ahli Kapolri) advises the Chief of Police regarding strategic matters. The advisory staff consists of:

- Advisory Staff Coordinator (Koordinator Staf Ahli), which coordinates the advisory staff's workflow;
- Advisor to the Chief of Police for Socio-Cultural Affairs (Staf Ahli Bidang Sosial Budaya);
- Advisor to the Chief of Police for Political Affairs (Staf Ahli Bidang Politik);
- Advisor to the Chief of Police for Economic Affairs (Staf Ahli Bidang Ekonomi); and
- Advisor to the Chief of Police for Management (Staf Ahli Bidang Manajemen).

=== Headquarters elements ===
- Executive Personal Staff (Staf Pribadi Pimpinan) provides technical and administrative support and assistance to the Police Chief and Deputy Chief in executing their duties.
- General Secretariat (Sekretariat Umum) provides general secretarial and administrative support within the Police Headquarters.
- Headquarters Service (Pelayanan Markas) provides technical support and other services within the Police Headquarters, including Headquarters facility management and maintenance.

=== Central executive agencies ===
- Baintelkam, or the Intelligence and Security Agency (Badan Intelijen dan Keamanan) is responsible for fostering and performing intelligence functions in the field of security for the purpose of performing the operational and management duties of the national police as well as to support the implementation of government duties in order to realize domestic security.
- Bareskrim, or the Criminal Investigation Agency (Badan Reserse Kriminal) is responsible for fostering and conducting criminal investigation and investigation functions, including the function of forensic laboratory identification, in the context of law enforcement.
- Baharkam, or the Security Maintenance Agency (Badan Pemelihara Keamanan) is responsible for fostering and conducting security guidance functions that include the maintenance and efforts to improve the security and public order conditions in order to achieve domestic security.
- Korbrimob, Brimob, or the Mobile Brigade Corps (Korps Brigade Mobil) is in charge of performing security counseling functions particularly with regard to the handling of high-intensity security disturbances, in the framework of enforcement of internal security.
- Korlantas, or the Traffic Corps (Korps Lalu Lintas) is responsible for fostering and organizing traffic functions that include community education, law enforcement, traffic assessment, registration and identification of drivers and motor vehicles, and conducting road patrols.
- Densus 88, or the Detachment 88 Anti-Terror Special Unit (Detasemen Khusus 88 Antiteror) is responsible for carrying out intelligence, prevention, investigation, enforcement and operational support functions in the investigation and investigation of terrorism.

=== Supporting elements ===
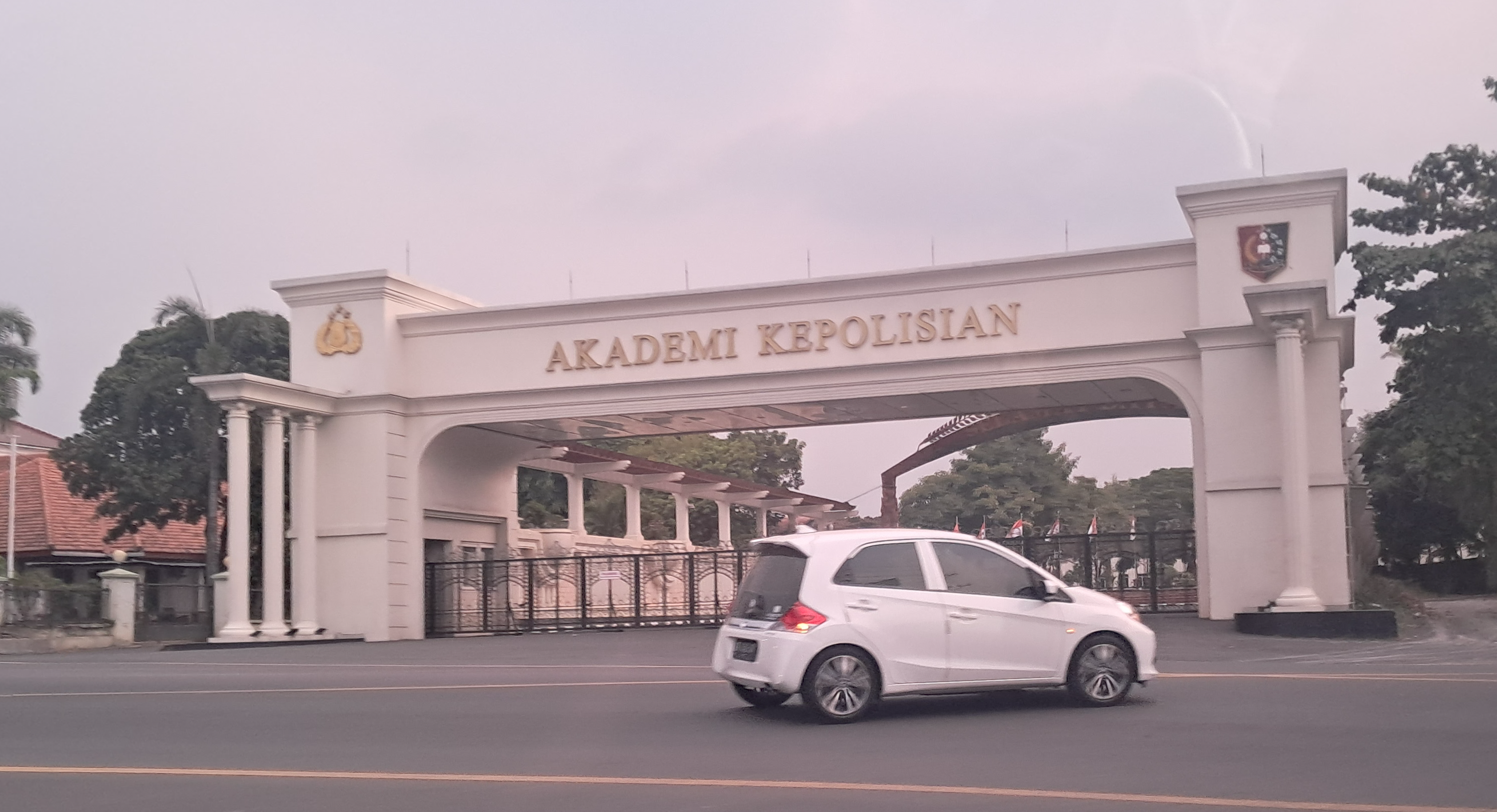
The Indonesian Police Academy, Semarang

- Police Education and Training Institute (Lembaga Pendidikan dan Pelatihan) or Lemdiklat for short, is in charge of planning, developing, and organizing the function of education and training in formation and development of and to the scope of the Indonesian National Police for ensuring education of recruits or personnel which are specializing in particular policing units which includes the maintaining of professionalism, managerial, academic, and vocational education. Lemdiklat is responsible for the operation of the following educational institutions:
  - National Police Staff College (Sekolah Staf dan Pimpinan) is the education implementing element and special staff educational institution related to the development of police management and administration within the officer corps. It consists of: (1) National Police Advanced Officers College (Sekolah Staf dan Pimpinan Pertama), (2) National Police Junior Staff College (Sekolah Staf dan Pimpinan Menengah), and (3) National Police Command and Staff College (Sekolah Staf dan Pimpinan Tinggi).
  - Police Academy (Akademi Kepolisian) provides training for police recruits.
  - Police Higher Education College (Sekolah Tinggi Ilmu Kepolisian) is an education and staffing element concerned with higher education and the development of police science.
  - Police Officers' Candidate School (Sekolah Pembentukan Perwira) is the element of education for the formation of Police Officers to become officer rank originating from enlisted or constable ranks of policemen and policewomen.
  - Police Baccalaureate Inspector School (Sekolah Inspektur Polisi Sumber Sarjana) is the element of education for the establishment of Police officer from graduates with bachelor's degree, rather than via the Police Academy or Police Officer's Candidate School.
  - Police Education and Training Centers (Pusat Pendidikan dan Pelatihan).
- Police Medical and Health Center (Pusat Kedokteran dan Kesehatan), including the Raden Said Soekanto National Police Central Hospital (Rumah Sakit Pusat Polri) in Jakarta, tasked with Police Force health administration, Police physical and psychological fitness, and Police healthcare.
- Police Finance Center (Pusat Keuangan) tasked with Police Force financial management and administration.
- Police Research and Development Center (Pusat Penelitian dan Pengembangan) tasked with Police Force research and development program management, research and development in public safety and order, research and development in public service, and other research and development functions.
- Police Historical and Heritage Center (Pusat Sejarah), tasked with researching, documenting, recording, managing, educating, and collecting Police Force's historical memories, objects, and events. It also manages the Police Force Headquarters museum and library.

=== Regional Police ===
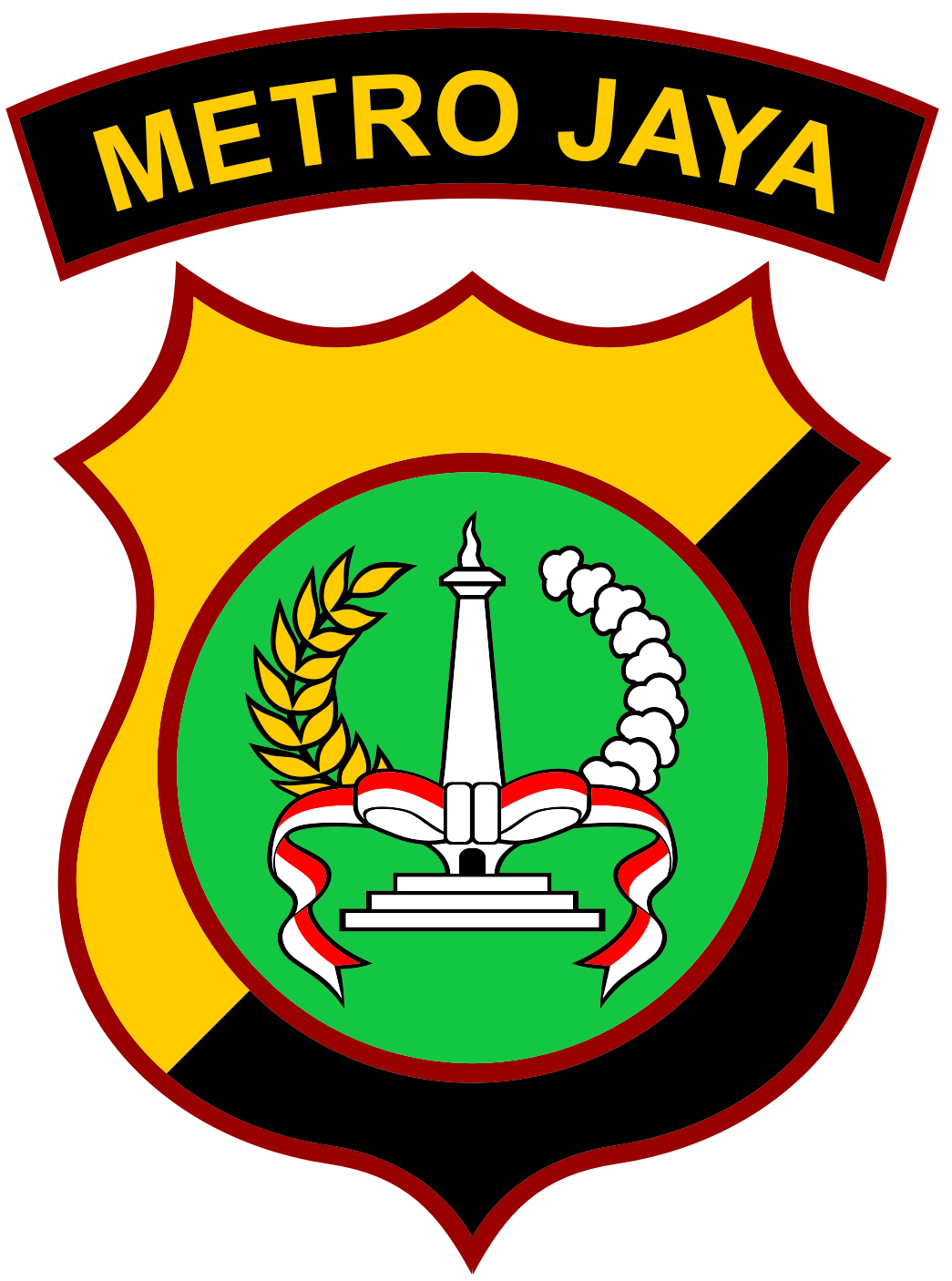
Emblem of the Metro Jaya Region

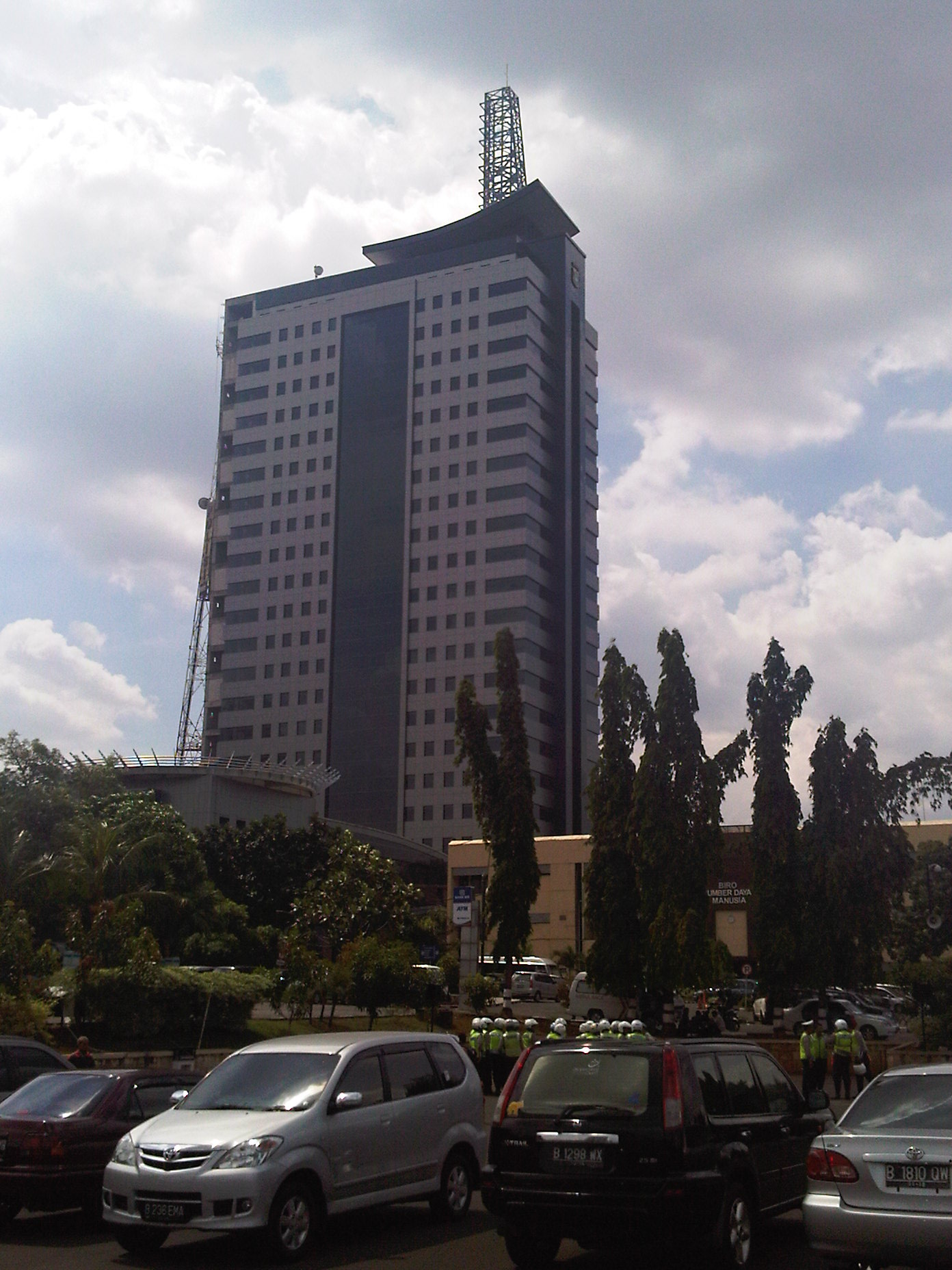
Polda Metro Jaya Headquarters

Polda Metro Jaya is the police headquarters of the Greater Jakarta Region covering the metropolitan area
- The Regional Police of the Republic of Indonesia (Polda) is the main implementing unit of territoriality under the Chief of Police. Polda is responsible for carrying out national police duties at province level. A "Polda" is headed by a Regional Chief of Police (Kapolda), which is responsible to the Chief of national Police (Kapolri) and holds the rank of either Inspector General or Brigadier General. Kapolda is assisted by Deputy Chief of Police (Wakapolda).
- The Regional Police (Polda) is responsible for the Departmental Police of the Republic of Indonesia (Polres) which covers a city or district/municipal level in that province. For big cities, Departamental Police (Polres) forces are called Metropolitan Police (Polrestabes), and for the urban type it is named only City Police (Polresta). The Polres has a complete police task force, like a Polda, and is led by a Police Chief Commissioner (Kombes) (for city police) or Police Superintendent (AKBP) for regency police.
- Sectoral Police (Polsek) are led by a Police Superintendent (AKBP) or Police Commissioner (Kompol) (for urban divisions), while in other Poldas, Polseks are led by officers of Police chief inspector (AKP) rank for Rural areas. In some areas which are remote like Papua, a Polsek may be led by a Police Inspector 2nd Class (Ipda).

Each Regional Police headquarters (Polda) which covers a province oversees the following directorates:

- Criminal Investigation Directorate
  - Sub-directorate of Criminal Affairs
  - Sub-Directorate for Crimes of Violence (Jatanras)
  - Sub-directorate for Teens, Children and Women affairs
  - Inafis Unit (Indonesia Automatic Finger Print Identification System) / Identification of TKP (Crime Scene)
- Directorate of Special Crimes Investigation
  - Sub-Directorate of Corruption
  - Sub-directorate of Land and building Property (Hardabangtah)
  - Sub-directorate of Cyber Crimes
- Directorate of Drug Investigation
  - Narcotics Subdivision
  - Psychotropic subdivision
- Directorate of Intelligence and Security
- Directorate of Traffic Security
  - Sub Directorate of Education and Conjecture (Dikyasa)
  - Sub Directorate of Registration and Identification (Regident)
  - Sub Directorate of Traffic Law Enforcement (Gakkum)
  - Sub Directorate of Road Security and Safety (Kamsel)
  - Sub Directorate of Road Escort and Patrol (Patwal)
  - Sub Directorate of Highway patrol (PJR)
- Animal Unit (Unit Satwa) - (mounted police and K9 dogs)
- Directorate of Community Guidance and Development (Bimmas, formerly Bina Mitra)
- Patrol Units (Sabhara) Directorate - ("Alert Unit")
- Directorate of VIP and Important Facility Protection (Pamobvit)
- Directorate of Water police and Aviation (Polairud)
- Directorate of Prisoners and Evidence Gathering (Tahti)
- Operations Bureau
- Human Resources Bureau
- Bureau of Infrastructure Facilities (Sarpras, formerly Logistic)
- Finance Office
- Bureau of internal Profession and Security (Propam) - (Internal affairs unit)
- Law Bureau
- Public Relations and Press Service
- Regional Police Medical Bureau

== Units ==
=== Special units ===
Units	Abbreviation	Explanation
Mobile Brigade Corps	Brimob	The Mobile Brigade Corps (Brimob) is the elite/special forces unit of the Indonesian National Police. As a paramilitary and SWAT force, it takes the duties to handle high-threat law enforcement operations under the command of the regional police office (Polda). Brimob is also responsible to carry out riot control duties during high-level civil unrest situations to back up the regular units (Sabhara). Personnel of this unit are identifiable by their dark blue berets and they usually wear black uniforms during operational duty, during low-intensity law enforcement operations they usually wear the greyish-brown uniform such as the regular police units (but worn un-tucked). As a paramilitary organization, its training and equipment is almost identical to the Indonesian Army's ("TNI"), and it conventionally operates under joint military command in conflict areas such as Papua and, until 2005, Aceh.
Gegana	-	Gegana is a unit within Brimob. It specializes in the field of counter-terrorism, bomb disposal, intelligence, anti-anarchist, and CBRN defence. It also conducts hostage rescue operations.
Detachment 88	Densus 88	Detasemen Khusus 88, Delta 88, or Densus 88 is the counter-terrorism squad of the Indonesian Police Force. Formed on 30 June 2003 after the 2002 Bali bombings, it is funded, equipped, and trained by the United States and Australia.

=== Public units ===
The following fall under department police headquarters (Polres) of cities and regencies:

Units	Abbreviation	Indonesian	Explanation
Centre of Integrated Police Services	SPKT	Sentra Pelayanan Kepolisian Terpadu	The SPKT is responsible for providing police services to the public, in the form of first receipt and handling of reports/complaints, police assistance services, and other related functions to carry out security and crime identification/prevention activities in accordance with applicable laws and regulations.
Intelligence and Security Unit	Sat-Intelkam	Satuan Intelijensi dan Keamanan	This unit is in charge of organizing / fostering the functions of Intelligence Security, including encryption, and service providers in the form of licenses / explanations concerning Foreigners, Firearms & Explosives, Sociopolitical Communities and Police Record Certificates (SKCK) to citizens in need and conduct supervision / security and its implementation.
Criminal Detective Unit	Sat-Reskrim	Satuan Reserse Kriminal	This unit is in charge of fostering Functions and conducting criminal investigation and detection activities, including the function of identification in the framework of law enforcement, coordination and supervision of operations and administration of investigation in accordance with applicable laws and regulations. Officers of this unit wear civilian attire on duty
Drug Detective Unit	Sat-Resnarkoba	Satuan Reserse Narkoba	This unit is responsible for conducting investigations of criminal acts of drug abuse, including counseling and guidance in the prevention and rehabilitation of drug abuse victims.
Community and Society Development Unit	Sat-Binmas	Satuan Bina Masyarakat	This unit is in charge to carry out community guidance, including community empowerment activities, public order and coordination activities with other forms of security, as well as cooperative activities in maintaining security and public order.
Patrol Unit	Sat-Sabhara	Satuan Samapta Bhayangkara	The Sabhara is the versatile "public alert unit" of the Indonesian police which has the tasks to supervise and maintain the public order and security of an area. It conducts patrolling and acts as first-responding law enforcement officers to calls and crime scenes. This unit is also tasked to assist security in public areas such as banks and sometimes assist the traffic police if needed. Under the command of the Regional Police (Polda), this unit is the first unit dispatched to secure and control protests and also perform riot control duties if necessary. Their patrol vehicles are colored grey and their personnel wear dark brown berets.
Traffic Unit	Sat-Lantas	Satuan Lalu Lintas	This unit is in charge for Traffic law enforcement, control, management, and patrolling affairs. Their patrol vehicles are colored white and blue and officers of this unit wear white peaked caps with reflective vests on duty.
Vital Object Protection Unit	Sat-Pamobvit	Satuan Pengamanan Obyek Vital	This unit serves the security activities of VIPs and important facilities, such as government officials, diplomatic missions, industrial complex and tourism areas. Their patrol vehicles are colored orange and officers of this unit wear neckties on their uniform.
Marine and Air Police Unit	Sat-Polairud	Satuan Polisi Perairan dan Udara	This unit is responsible for carrying out the functions of aquatic police, which include water patrols, waters law enforcement, coastal community development and other waters, as well as search and rescue accidents in marine areas (SAR). They also provide air support to local area operations or in support of national level INP units. They wear light blue berets and light blue service uniforms/flight suits.
Detainees and Evidence Unit	Sat-Tahti	Satuan Tahanan dan Barang Bukti	This internal unit is in charge to organize prisoners' care, including prisoners' health care, guardianship and the receiving, storing and securing of evidence and their administration within the regional police headquarters, reporting the number and condition of the detainees in accordance with provisions of the law.
Information Technology Unit	Si-Tipol	Seksi Teknologi Informasi Polri	This unit is responsible for computer and IT system management and development for policing duties
Internal Security and Profession Unit	Si-Propam	Seksi Profesi dan Pengamanan	This unit is responsible to carry out internal investigation towards police personnel suspected of misconduct and also to enforce discipline towards police personnel. Officers of this unit are identifiable by their light blue berets and wear white belts with aiguillettes.

== Rank structure ==
In the early years, the Indonesian Police used European style police ranks, like "Brigadier", "Inspector", and "Commissioner". When the police were amalgamated with the military structure during the 1960s, the armed forces' ranking system was brought in, using ranks such as "Captain", "Major", and "Colonel". In the year 2000, when the Indonesian Police transitioned into a fully independent force, they used British style ranks like "Constable" and "Superintendent", but returned to their original ranking system a year later, albeit with some Indonesianized elements to help bolster national pride.

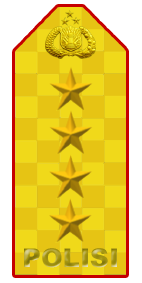
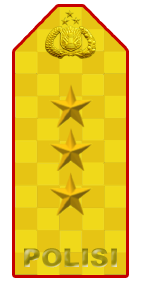
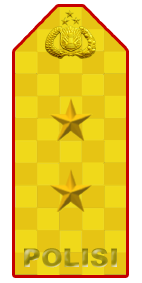
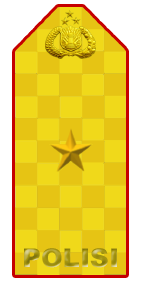
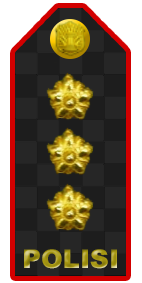
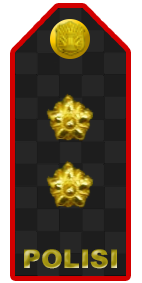
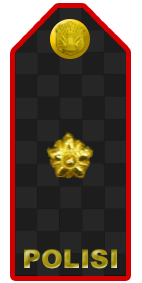
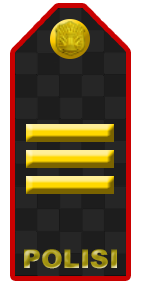
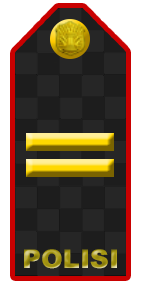
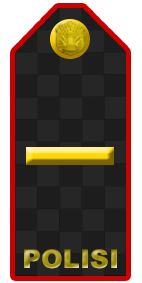
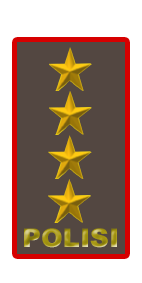
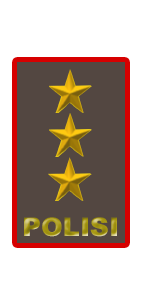
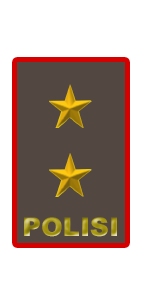
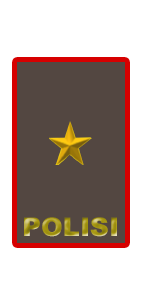
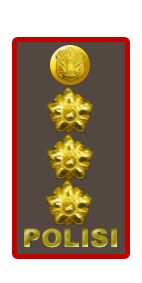
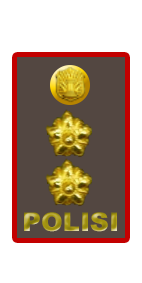
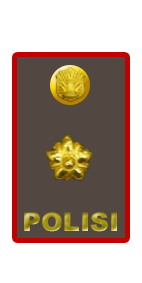
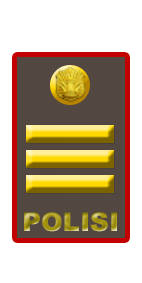
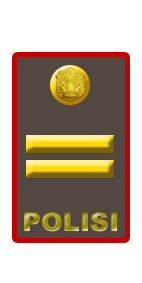
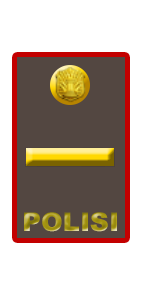
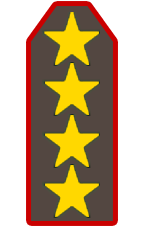
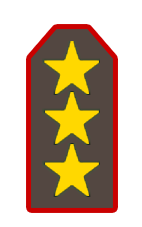
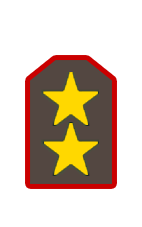
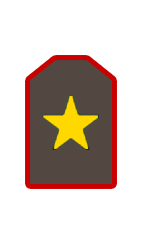
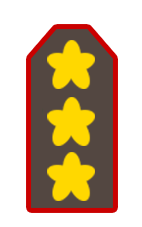
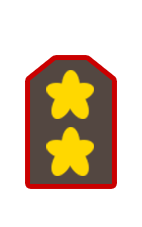
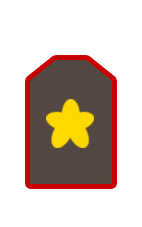
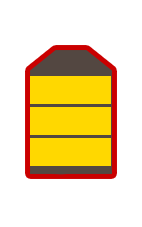
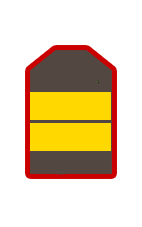
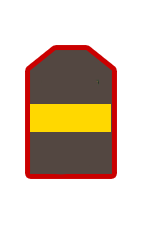
Worn on:	General Officers				Senior Officers			Junior Officers
Ceremonial Dress Uniform (PDU)
Service Uniform (PDH)
Field Uniform (PDL) on collar
Rank in Indonesian:	Jenderal Polisi (Jenderal Pol)	Komisaris Jenderal Polisi (Komjen Pol)	Inspektur Jenderal Polisi (Irjen Pol)	Brigadir Jenderal Polisi (Brigjen Pol)	Komisaris Besar Polisi (Kombes Pol)	Ajun Komisaris Besar Polisi (AKBP)	Komisaris Polisi (Kompol)	Ajun Komisaris Polisi (AKP)	Inspektur Polisi Satu (Iptu)	Inspektur Polisi Dua (Ipda)
Rank in English:	Police General	Police Commissioner General	Police Inspector General	Police Brigadier General	Police Chief Commissioner	Police Adjunct Chief Commissioner	Police Commissioner	Police Adjunct Commissioner	Police 1st Inspector	Police 2nd Inspector
Office or duty	Chief of National Police	Vice Chief, chief of national police organs	chief of regional police, vice chief of national police organs, chief of national police divisions, commandant Mobile Brigade (Brimob) corps	director of national police general directorates, vice chief of regional police	chief of departamental police, director of regional police directorates, regional police spokesperson	vice chief of departmental police	chief of sectoral police	chief of sectoral police

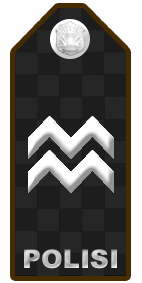
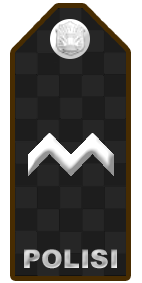
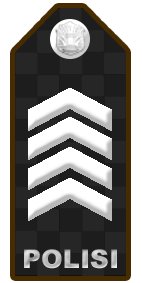
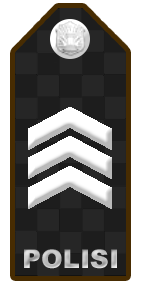
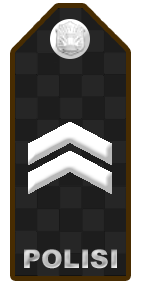
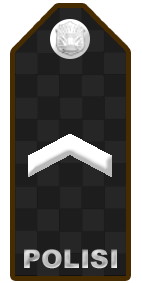
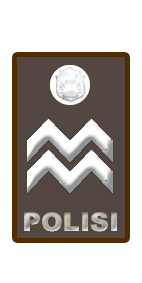
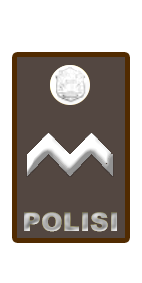
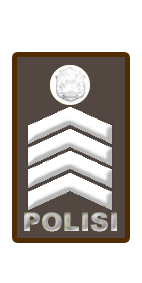
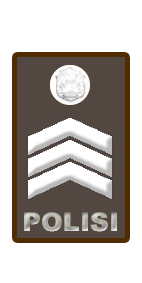
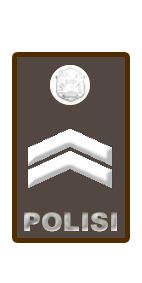
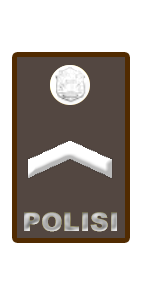
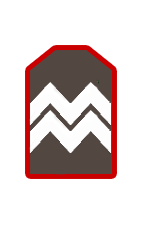
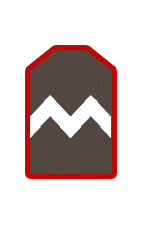
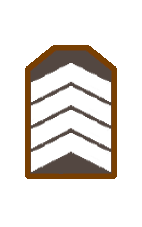
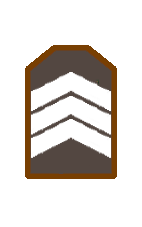
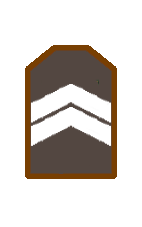
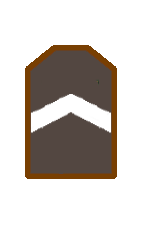
Worn on:	Sub-inspectors of Police (WO)		Constables (NCO)
Ceremonial Dress Uniform (PDU)
Service Uniform (PDH)
Field Uniform (PDL) on collar
Rank in Indonesian:	Ajun Inspektur Polisi Satu (Aiptu)	Ajun Inspektur Polisi Dua (Aipda)	Brigadir Polisi Kepala (Bripka)	Brigadir Polisi (Brigpol)	Brigadir Polisi Satu (Briptu)	Brigadir Polisi Dua (Bripda)
Rank in English:	Police 1st Sub-Inspector	Police 2nd Sub-Inspector	Police; Chief Brigadier	Police Brigadier	Police 1st Brigadier	Police 2nd Brigadier

The following ranks are only used by personnel serving in the Mobile Brigade Corps and Water police units:

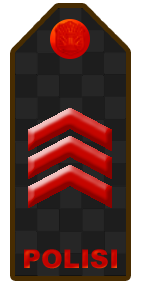
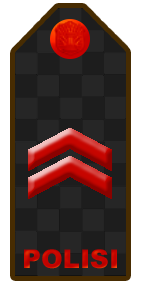
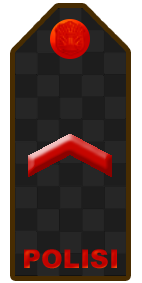
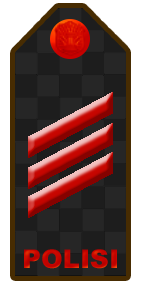
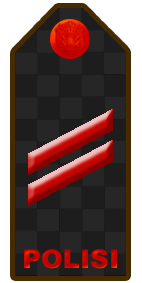
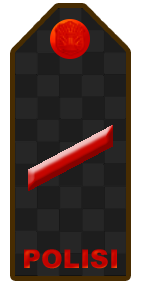
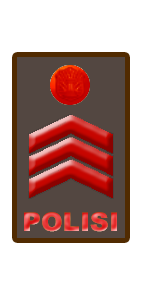
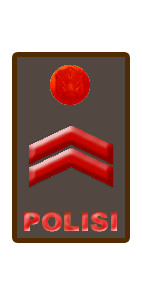
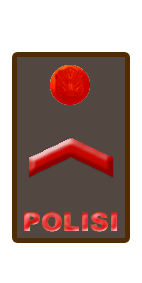
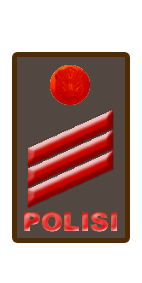
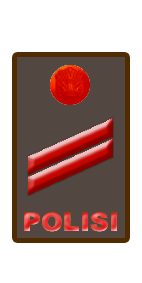
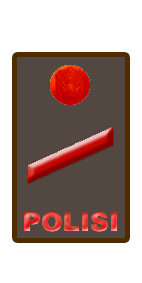
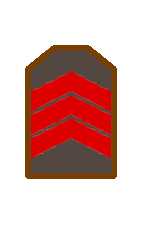
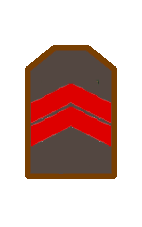
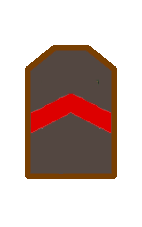
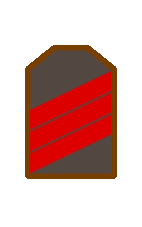
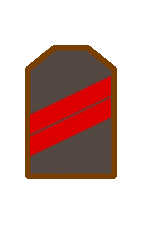
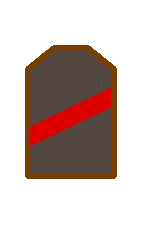
Worn on:	High-rank Enlisted			Junior Enlisted
Ceremonial Dress Uniform (PDU)
Service Uniform (PDH)
Field Uniform (PDL) on collar
Rank in Indonesian:	Ajun Brigadir Polisi (Abrigpol)	Ajun Brigadir Polisi Satu (Abriptu)	Ajun Brigadir Polisi Dua (Abripda)	Bhayangkara Kepala (Bharaka)	Bhayangkara Satu (Bharatu)	Bhayangkara Dua (Bharada)
Rank in English:	Police Sub-Brigadier	Police 1st Sub-Brigadier	Police 2nd Sub-Brigadier	Senior Patrolman	1st Patrolman	2nd Patrolman

== Issues ==
=== Corruption ===
In the eyes of the people, the National Police force is "corrupt, brutal, and inept". Even becoming a police officer can be expensive, with applicants having to pay up to Rp 90 million, according to Indonesia Police Watch head, Neta Saputra Pane.

In April 2009, angry that the Corruption Eradication Commission (KPK) had tapped his phone while investigating a corruption case, Indonesian Police chief detective Susno Duadji compared the KPK to a gecko (cicak) fighting a crocodile (buaya) meaning the police. Susno's comment, as it turned out, quickly backfired because the image of a cicak standing up to a buaya (similar to David and Goliath imagery) immediately had wide appeal in Indonesia. A noisy popular movement in support of the cicak quickly emerged. Students staged pro-cicak demonstrations, many newspapers ran cartoons with cicaks lining up against an ugly buaya, and numerous TV talk shows took up the cicak versus buaya topic with enthusiasm. As a result, references to cicaks fighting a buaya have become a well-known part of the political imagery of Indonesia.

In June 2010, the Indonesian news magazine Tempo published a report on "fat bank accounts" held by senior police officers containing billions of rupiah. When the magazine went on sale in the evening groups of men said by witnesses to be police officers, went to newsstands with piles of cash to try to buy all the copies before they could be sold.

When KPK investigators tried to search Polri headquarters in 2010 as part of an investigation into Djoko Susilo, then the head of Korlantas (police corps of traffic), they were detained, and only released following the intervention of the president, Susilo Bambang Yudhoyono. Following a trial, Djoko was jailed for 18 years. Two years later, the KPK began investigating another senior police officer, Budi Gunawan, who was subsequently nominated for the post of National Police Chief. The KPK then named Budi a suspect and his nomination was withdrawn. However, he was later sworn in as deputy police chief. The police subsequently took revenge by charging three KPK commissioners with criminal offenses.

=== Violence and human rights abuses ===
Amnesty International has accused Polri of "widespread" torture and other abuses of arrested individuals. According to the organization, "Police in Indonesia shoot, beat and even kill people without fear of prosecution, leaving their victims with little hope of justice".

In 2014 Human Rights Watch reported that a physical virginity test is routinely performed on female applicants to the police force.

An official admission of violence by police officers came in 2016 when Chief Gen. Badrodin Haiti admitted that officers of the Detachment 88 anti-terror unit were responsible for the death in custody of terrorist suspect Siyono, who died of heart failure after being kicked hard enough in the chest to fracture his ribs. The Indonesian National Commission on Human Rights stated in March 2016 that at least 121 terror suspects had died in custody since 2007

Amnesty International called in June 2019 for an investigation of "credible evidence" of a range of grave violations by police, who it alleged were responsible for 10 unlawful killings in the aftermath of the re-election of president Joko Widodo.

In July 2020, the Indonesian Commission for Missing Persons and Victims of Violence (KontraS) issued a report detailing police brutality over the preceding year that resulted in 304 deaths and 1,627 injuries in 921 violent incidents. The report also mentioned arbitrary arrests of people demonstrating legally, and acts of discrimination towards ethnic Papuans. The following year, the same organization reported 651 acts of violence against civilians resulting in 13 deaths and 98 injuries. Most of the deaths were caused by excessive violence and arbitrary shootings.

In the summer of 2022, an investigation into the murder of Nofriansyah Yosua Hutabarat, an Indonesian police officer, overcame an alleged cover-up by police generals to conceal an alleged premeditated murder committed by Inspector General Ferdy Sambo, head of internal affairs of the Indonesian National Police, and four others, including Sambo's wife. The chair of Indonesia Police Watch called the affair "the worst scandal in the police's history". Ferdy Sambo was sentenced to death (later commuted to life imprisonment), with Amnesty Indonesia stating "the case should serve as a reminder to the police that it needed to make serious improvements in its internal operations and that this was not the first time that a police officer had been involved in an extrajudicial killing".

On 1 October 2022, Indonesian riot police deployed tear gas inside Kanjuruhan Stadium in response to a pitch invasion and clashes with football supporters, which triggered a stampede of people in the stadium trying to escape from the effects of the gas. A crush formed at an exit, resulting in fans being asphyxiated. As a result, 134 people died, and more than 500 were injured. The National Commission on Human Rights in Indonesia (KOMNAS HAM) investigated the use of tear gas by police, and found that the Indonesian National Police were one of 6 parties responsible for the tragedy due to excessive use of tear gas inside the stadium. Other visual investigations, such as one by Narasi, also highlighted the force's excessive use of tear gas. Out of the 3 commanding officers that were charged for giving the order for tear gas to be fired, only 1 was given an 18-month sentence, whilst the other officers were acquitted, in a verdict deemed "an offense to the public's sense of justice".

== Equipment ==
=== Firearms ===
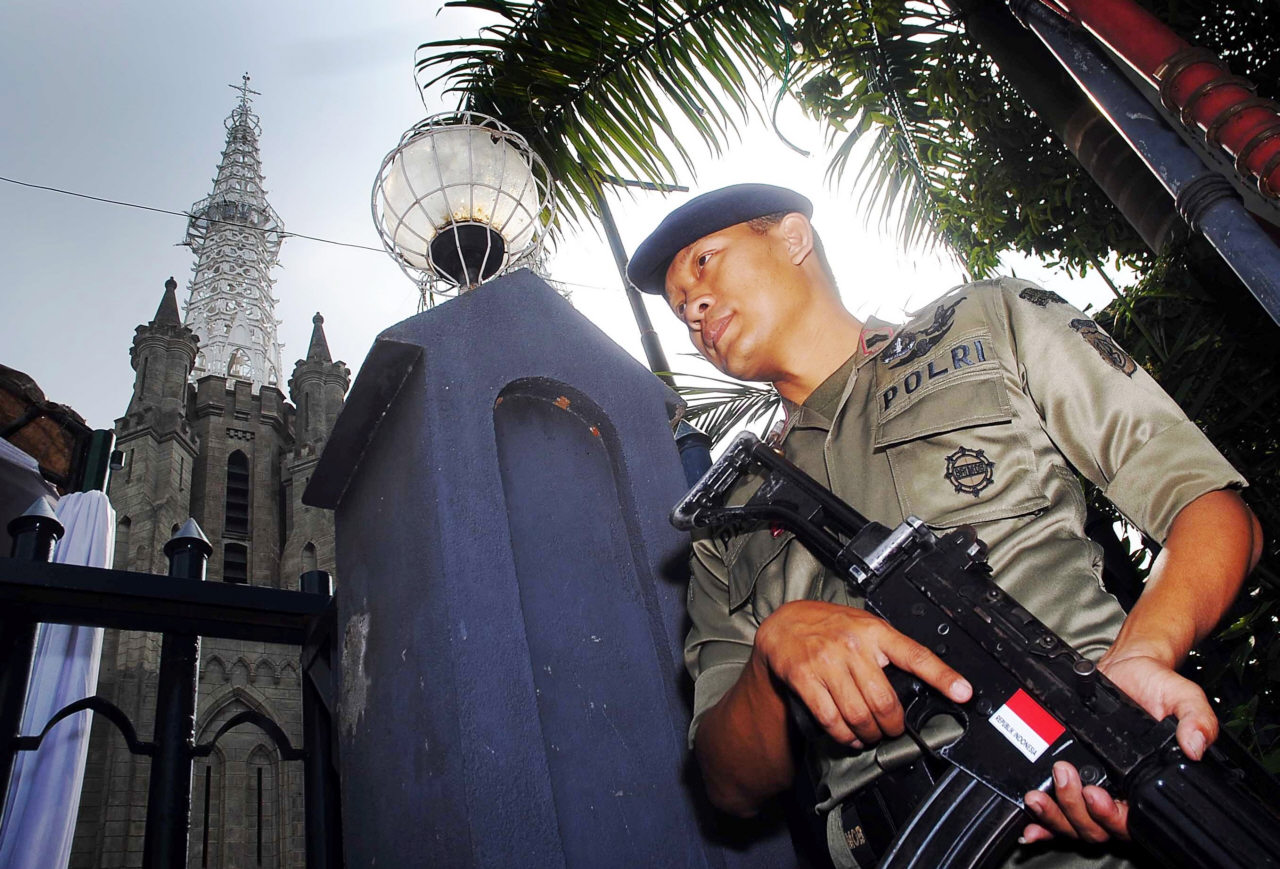
An Indonesian Armed BRIMOB special Police personnel with a Pindad SS1 assault rifle guarding outside the Jakarta Cathedral

The standard issue sidearm to all Indonesian National Police officers is the Taurus Model 82 revolver in .38 Special. While police personnel attached to special units such as Detachment 88, Gegana and BRIMOB are issued with the Glock 17 semi-automatic pistol.

Heavy arms are always available to Indonesian police personnel, such as the Heckler & Koch MP5 sub-machine gun, Remington 870 shotgun, Steyr AUG assault rifle, AK-101, M4 carbine, SIG MCX, SIG MPX, M1 Carbine. and other weapons. The standard rifle for the Indonesian National Police are the Pindad SS1 and the M16 rifle. Units are also issued the "Sabhara"/Police V1-V2 Pindad SS1 special law enforcement assault rifle.

=== Police vehicles ===
The police vehicles that are usually operated by the Indonesian Police ("Polri") for patrol and law enforcement activities are mainly, Mitsubishi Lancer, Hyundai Elantra (for some police regions), Mitsubishi Strada/Triton, Isuzu D-Max, Nissan Almera, Ford Ranger and Nissan Navara. Such vehicles are usually operated by the "Sabhara" police unit and other units which the vehicles are mainly colored dark-grey. In some areas, usually in rural places, the vehicles are not up-to date compared to the ones in the major urban areas in the country, so some police vehicles still use older versions such as the Toyota Kijang and Mitsubishi Kuda.

Special Investigation units usually operate in black Toyota Avanza and some are unmarked vehicles. Police laboratory and forensics ("Puslabfor") units are issued dark-grey police Suzuki APV, Isuzu D-Max, Ford Ranger, Toyota Fortuner or Mitsubishi Fuso Canter vehicles.

The Traffic Police Corps ("Korlantas") usually uses vehicles such as the Mazda 6, Mitsubishi Lancer, Mitsubishi Galant V6, Toyota Vios, Toyota Corolla, Hyundai Ioniq, Mitsubishi Pajero Sport, Toyota Fortuner (usually for escort), Hyundai Elantra, Tesla Model 3 (mostly in Jakarta), Ford Ranger, Hino Dutro, Isuzu MU-X, and Toyota Hilux (coloured white and blue). Some vehicles for traffic patrol are also used such as the Toyota Rush, Daihatsu Terios and Suzuki Grand Vittara. Sedan types are usually used for highway and road patrolling as well as escort duties. Double-Cab types are usually used for traffic incidents and traffic management law enforcement activities.

The Pengamanan Objek Vital (Pam Obvit), or in English the Vital Object Protection Unit use sedans coloured in orange such as the Ford Focus and Mitsubishi Lancer and the white-orange Chevrolet Captivas. These vehicles are usually parked outside and operated for protecting international embassies, airports, and other special specified locations. It is also used by the Tourist police for patrol.

For the paramilitary police, counter-terrorism and anti-riot units such as the Mobile Brigade or "Brimob", Detachment 88 and "Gegana" special types of vehicles are used to carry out the special operations of these branches. The vehicles that are used are often armored, have bullet proof glass and mounts for small arms. The vehicles used include the Pindad Komodo, Barracuda 4x4 APC (A licensed South Korean variant of the German TM-170) Panus 4x4 Light Armored Patrol Car, DAPC 1/2 4x4 Light Armoured Transport Vehicle, and modified armored Mitsubishi Strada and Nissan Terrano SUVs. Vehicles are coloured in dark-grey with the bumpers and wheels being coloured in red or yellow or both. Some special operational "Gegana" and "Densus 88" vehicles are also coloured in black instead of the regular dark-grey. The different usage of colour for the different branches helps the public more easily distinguish the vehicles from each service.

Other customised vehicles used by police personnel are usually modified Suzuki Mega Carry, Isuzu Elf and Toyota Dyna with horizontal side sitting facilities inside of the trunk covered by dark colored canvas for canopy. Costumed patrol pick-ups with mounted sitting facilities on the trunk covered with canopy are also operated by the police to carry police personnel during patrol, the pick-ups are usually Isuzu Panther pick-ups and usually operate in rural areas.

For high-ranking officers (usually generals), issued cars are usually grey (some black) full to compact sedans and Mid to Full-sized SUVs. Such cars are mainly chauffeured Toyota Camry, Hyundai Sonata, Toyota Land Cruiser, Suzuki Grand Vitara and Toyota Prado. Some use black Toyota Innova.

Ford Focus are only in limited use by both the Korlantas and Sabhara. MPVs like Honda Mobilio and Toyota Innova are sometimes used by Korlantas units for patrol and escort.

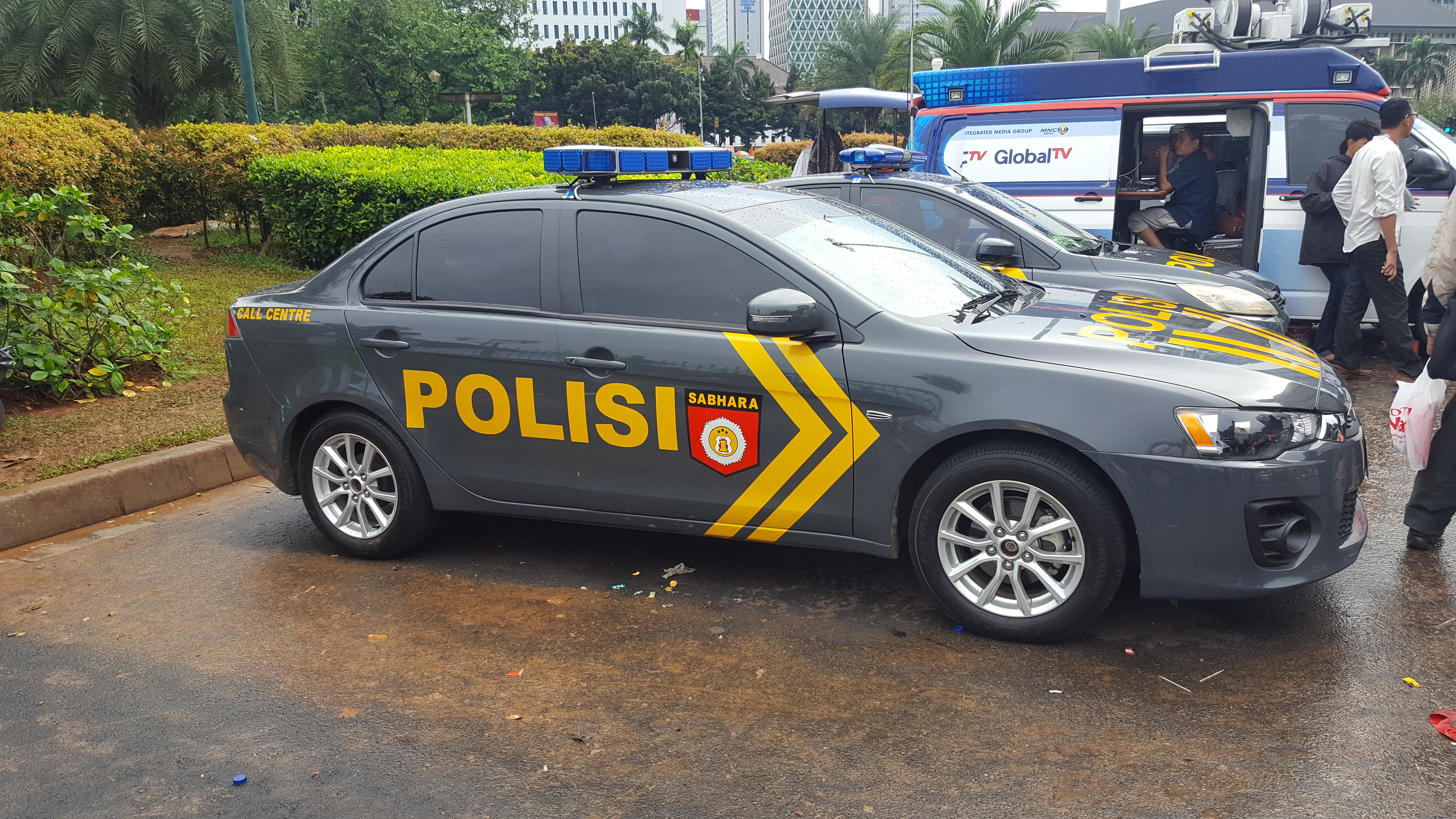
A Mitsubishi Lancer patrol car used by Sabhara patrol unit officers

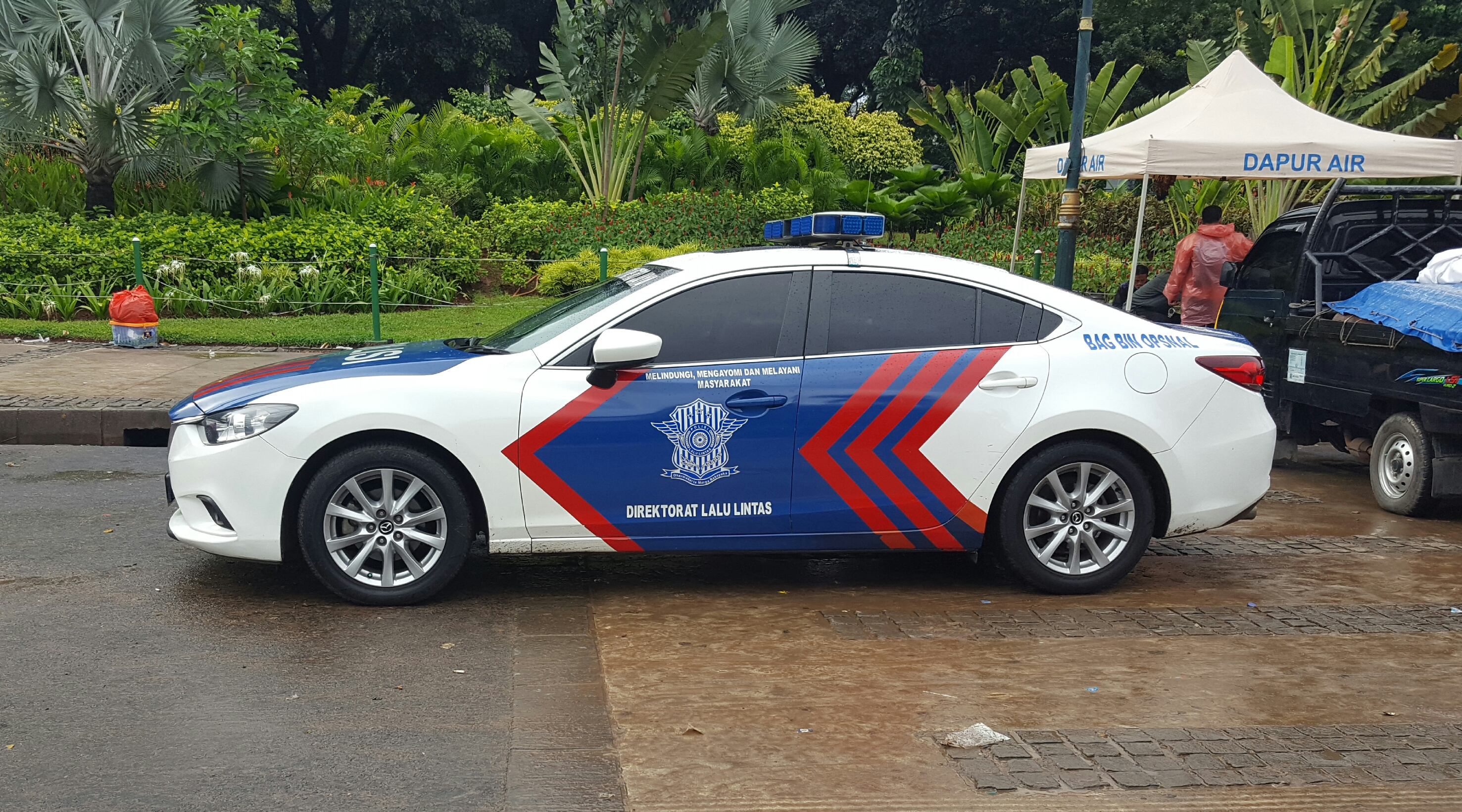
A Mazda6 patrol car used by the Traffic unit

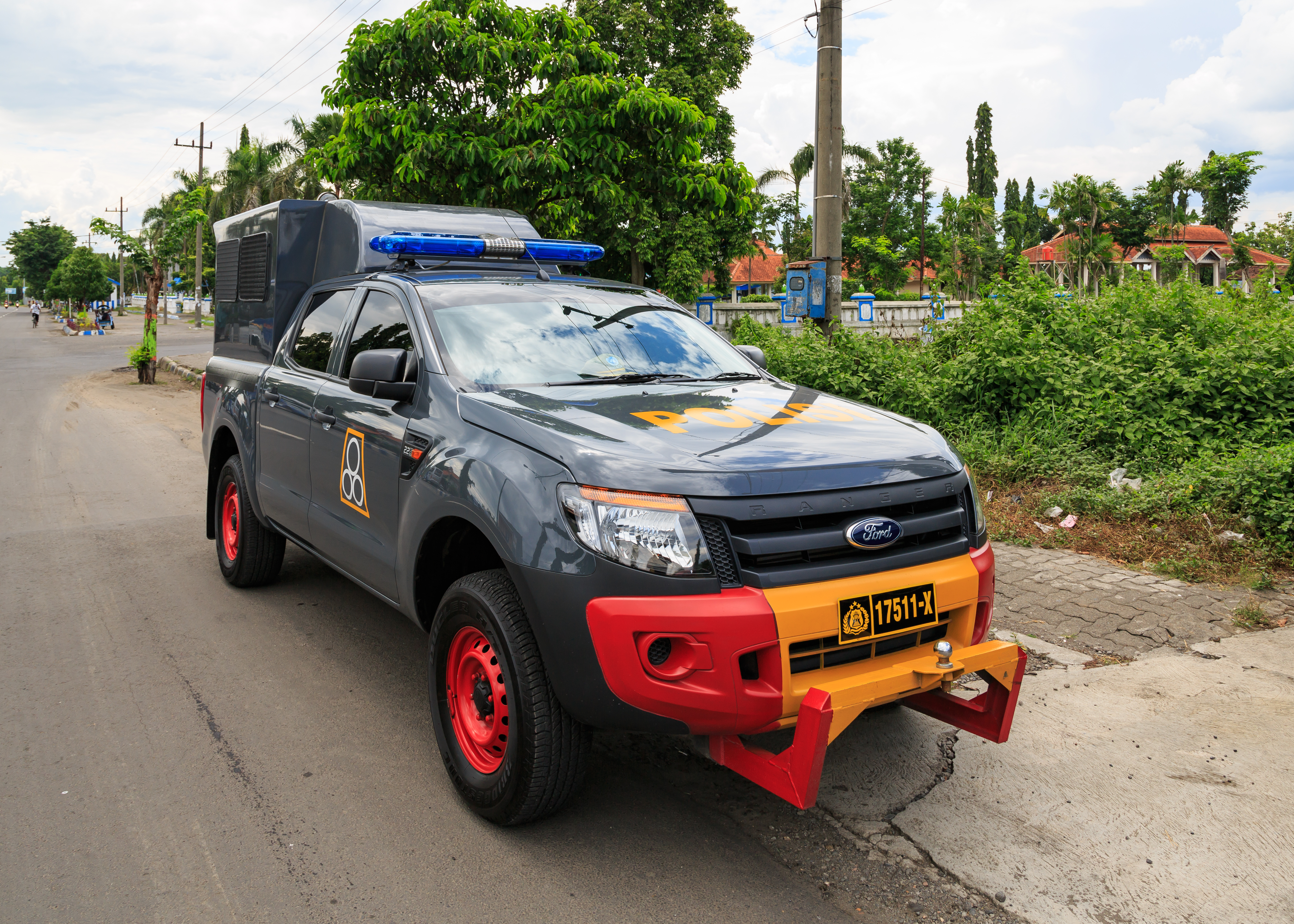
A Customized Ford Ranger used by the Mobile Brigade Corps

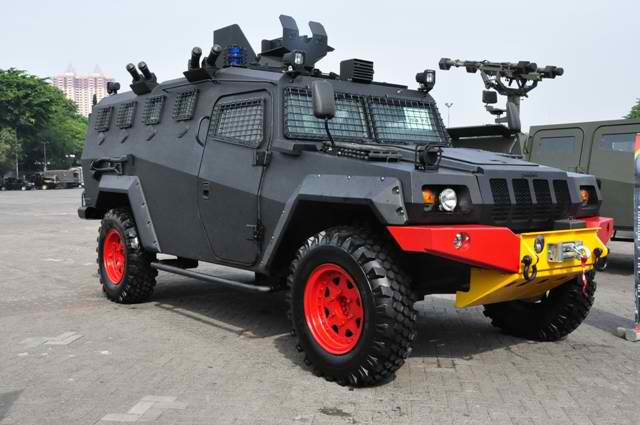
A Pindad Komodo Indonesian Mobile Brigade special police tactical vehicle

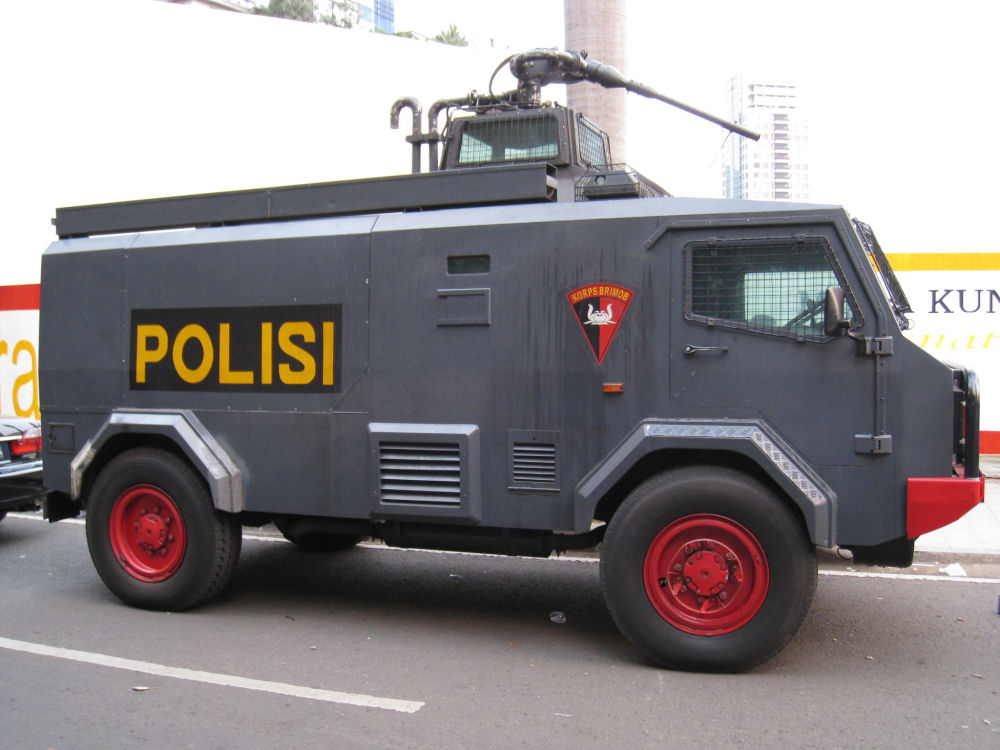
Police Mobile Brigade riot vehicle

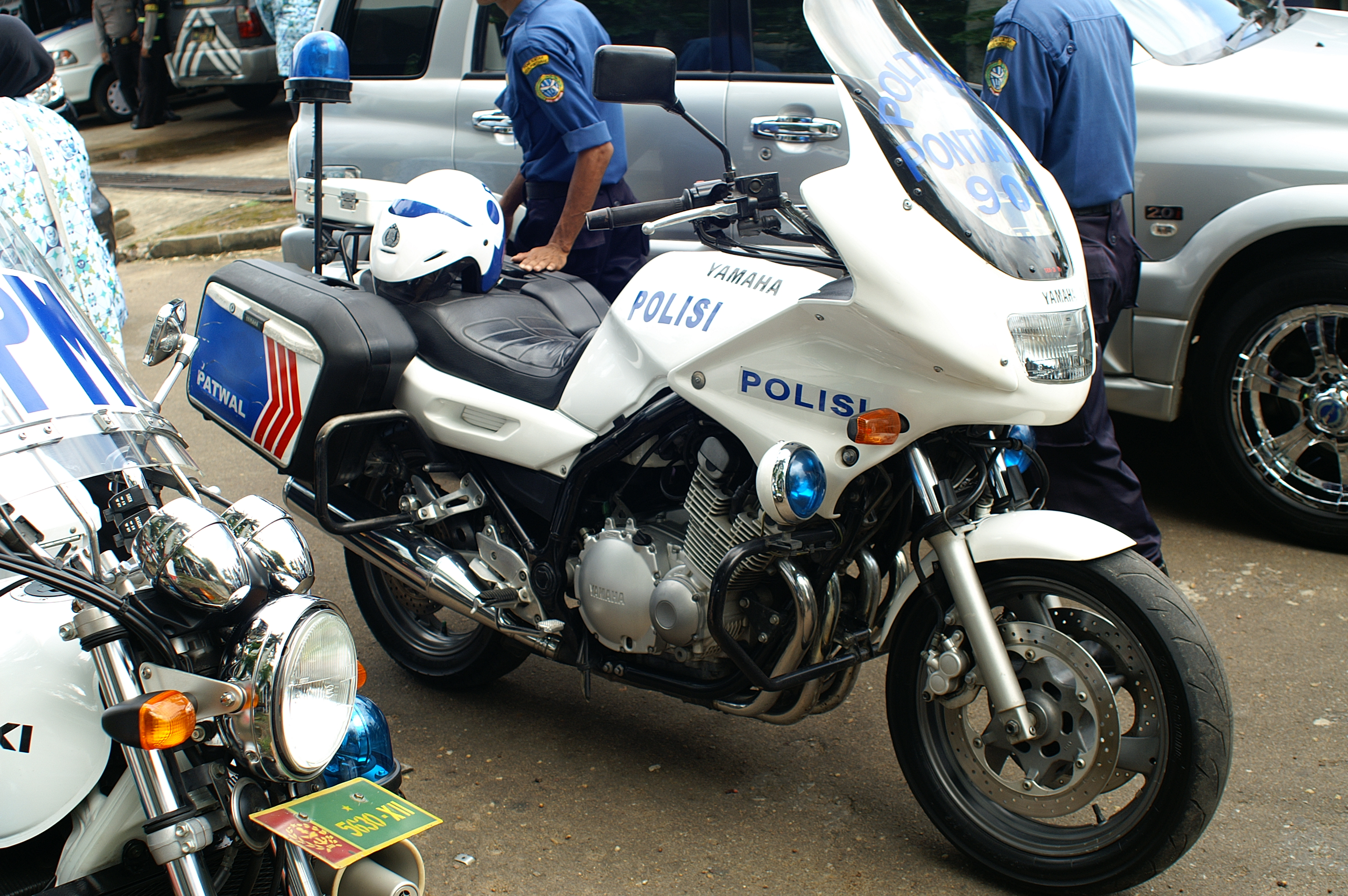
Yamaha XJ900P Indonesian Traffic police motorcycle

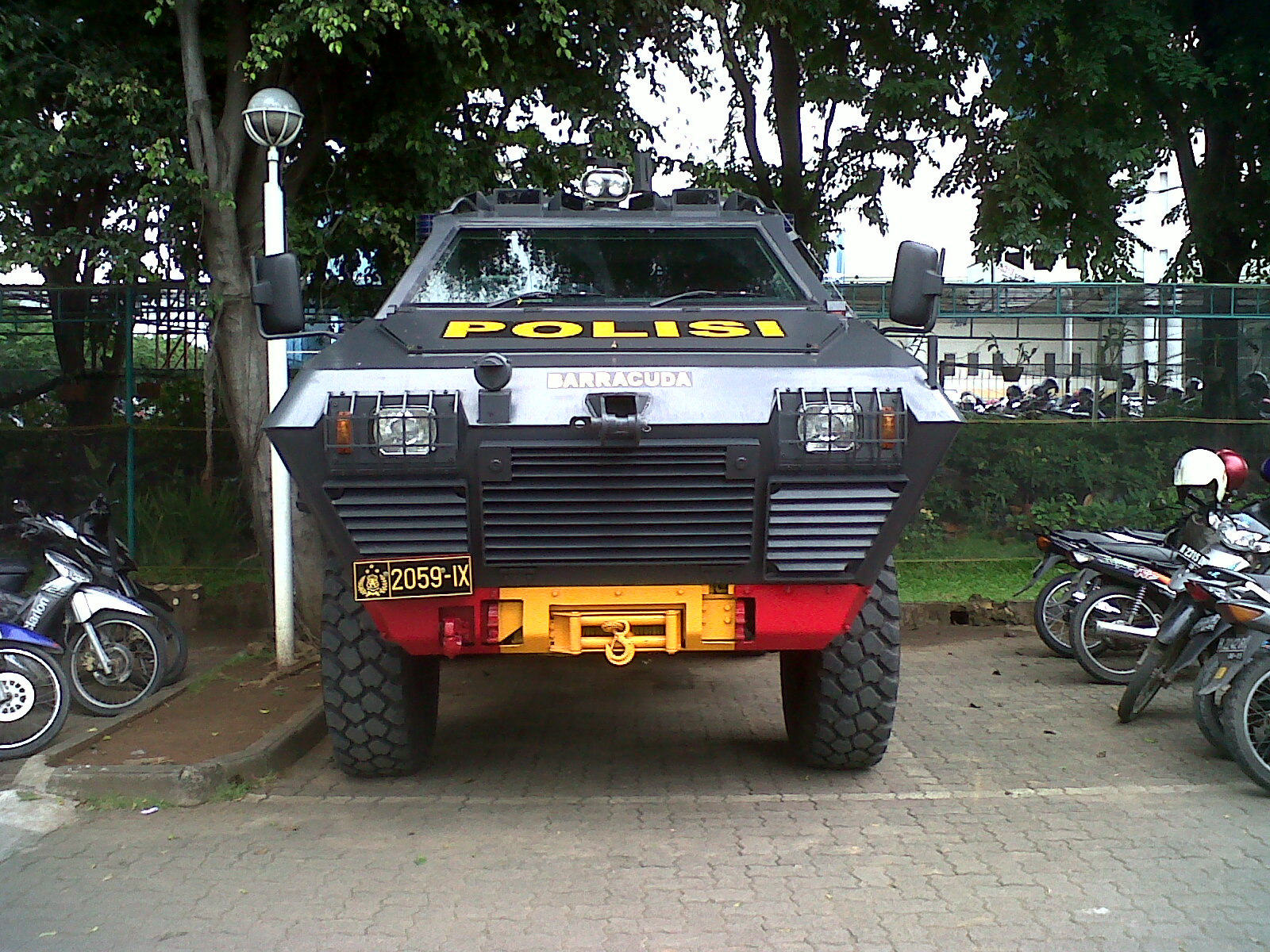
Barracuda APC Mobile Brigade riot control vehicle

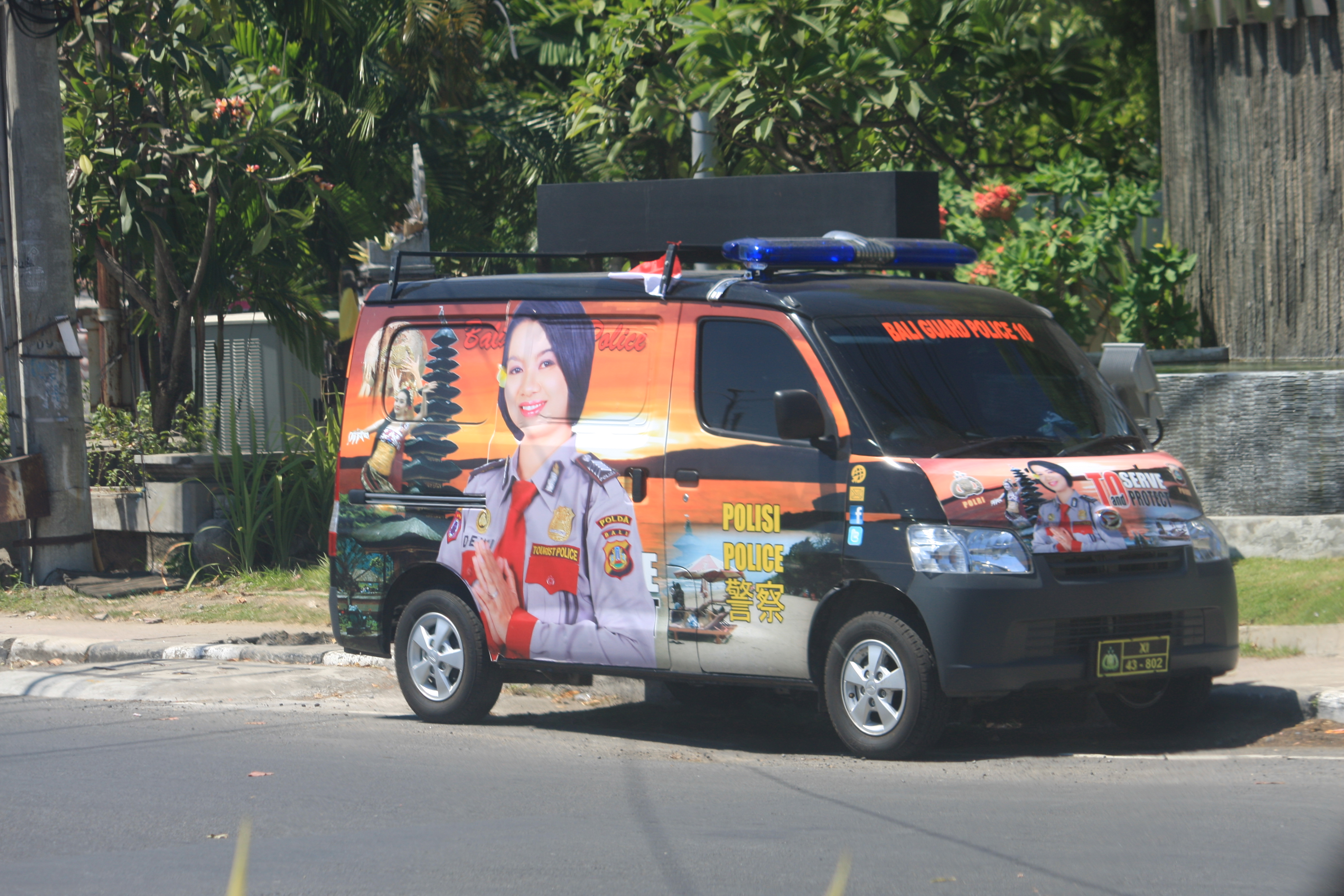
Daihatsu Gran Max Indonesian Tourist Police Service Van

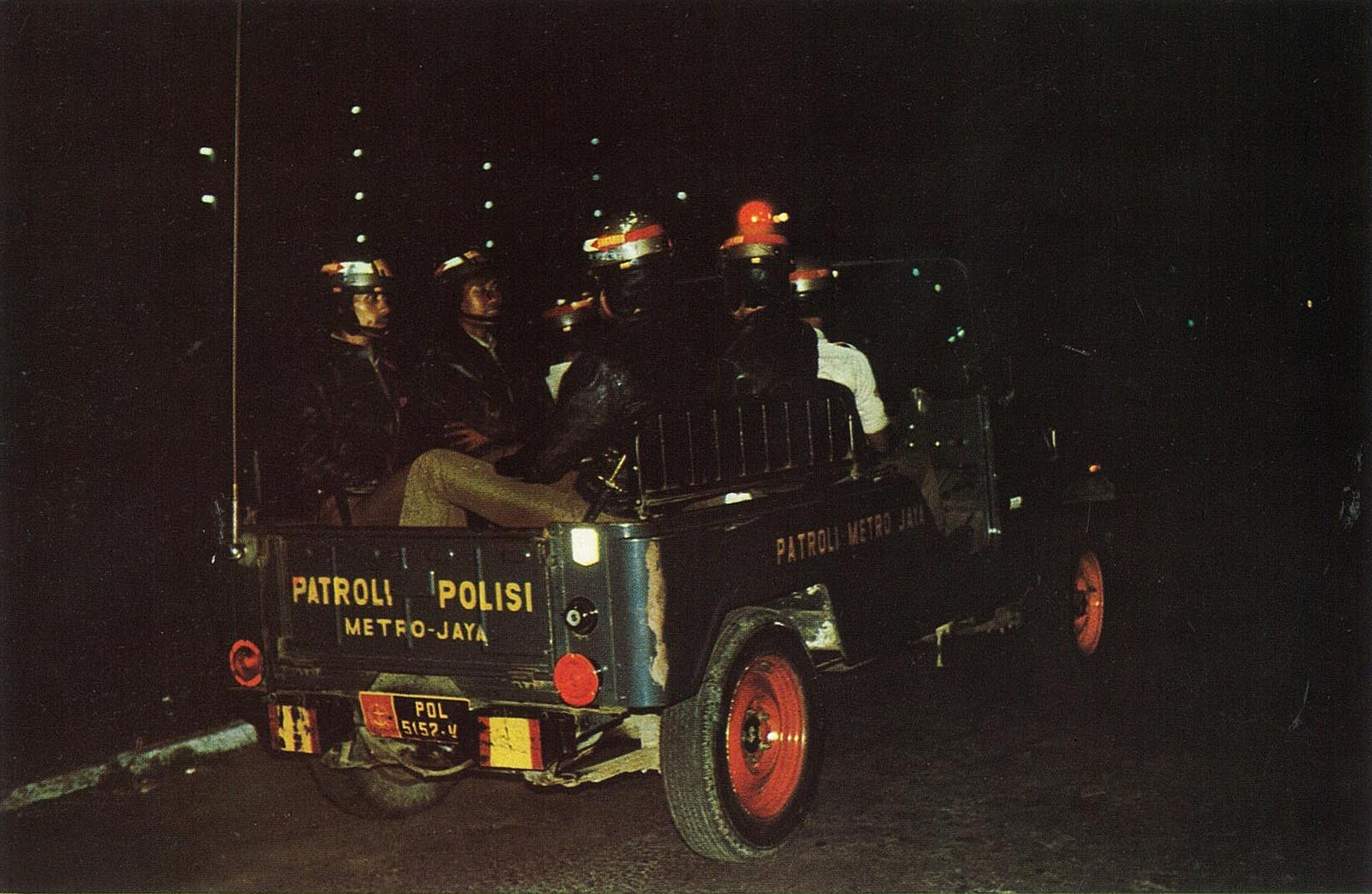
An Indonesian Police patrol vehicle circa 1976

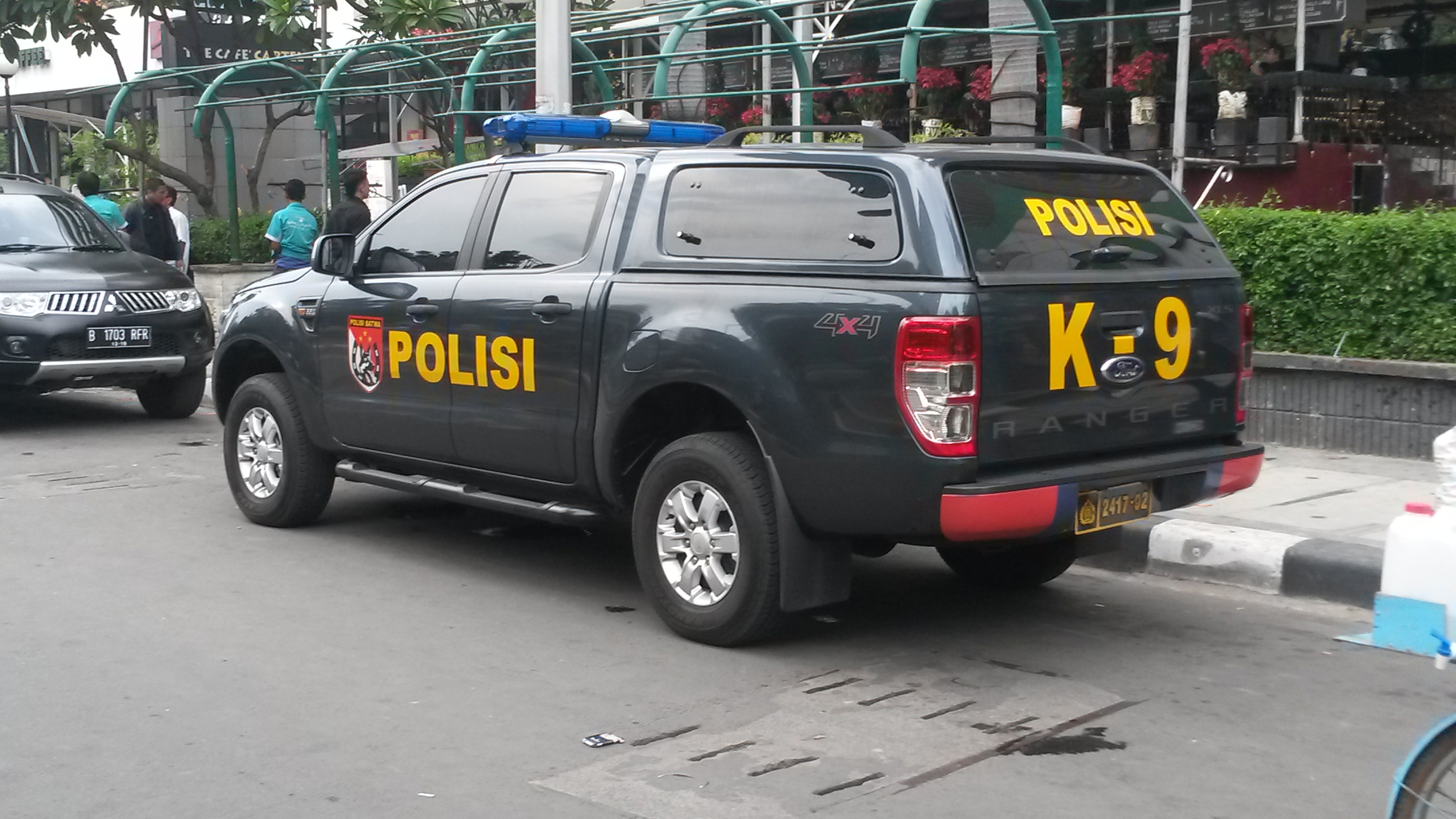
An Indonesian K9 Police Unit Vehicle

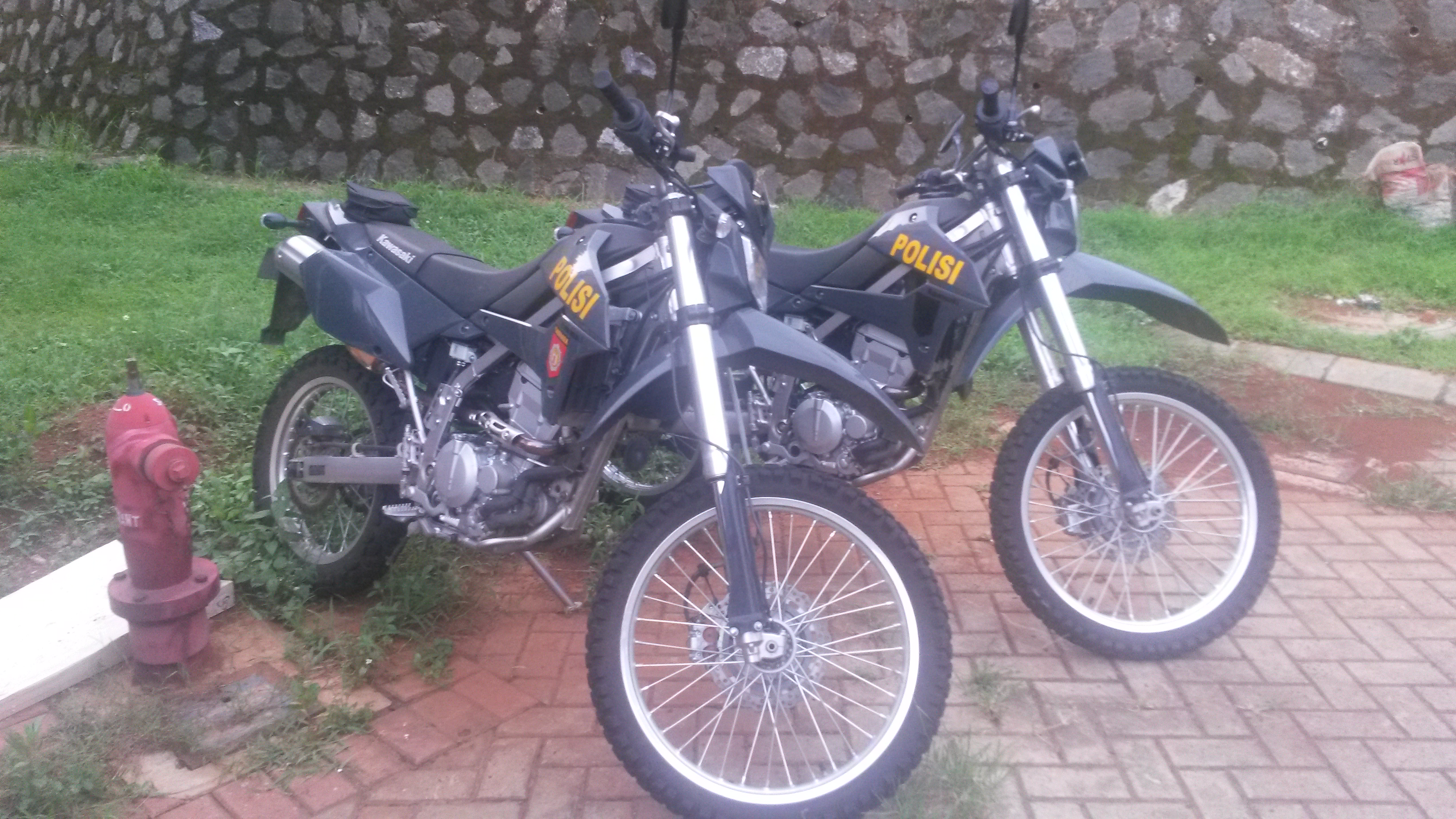
Police Off-Road Kawasaki KLX 250 units

== Uniform ==
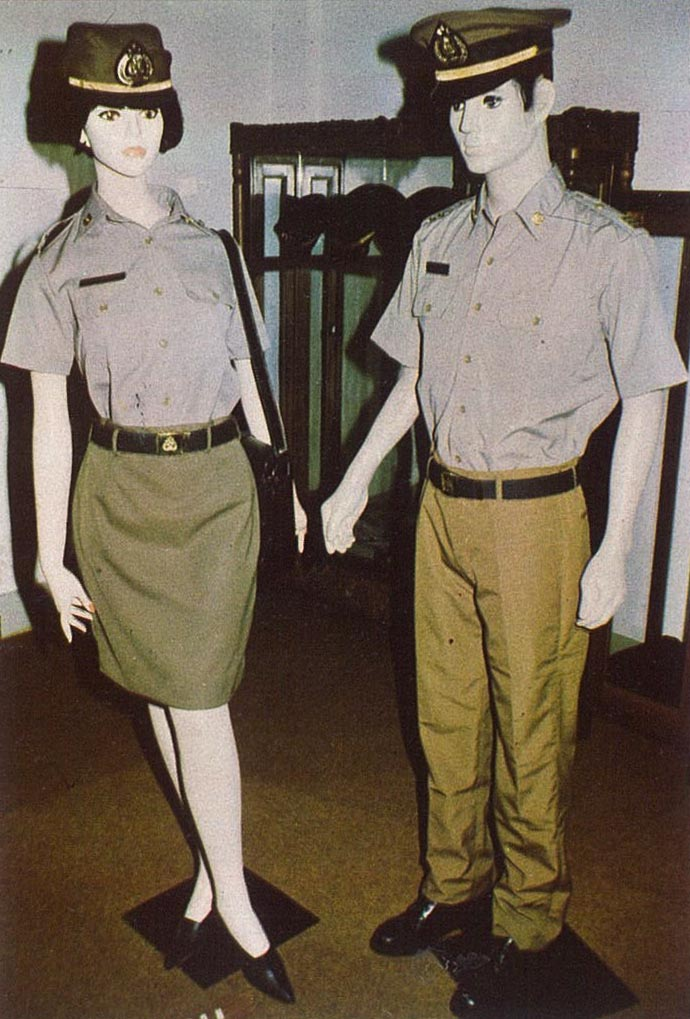
Example police uniform, c 1976

The National Police Force of Indonesia had changes for uniform colours on at least three occasions. The periods are:

- Since it was first formed until the mid-'70s, the uniform colour was khaki like the current Indian Police uniform.
- Since the late '70s until the mid-'90s, the uniform colour was light brown and brown.
- Since the mid-'90s the colour has been brownish grey and dark brown.

Based on the regulation of the Chief of the Indonesian National Police, there are four types of uniform worn by police personnel which are:

- ceremonial uniform (PDU: PDU-I, PDU-II, PDU-III, PDU-IV)
- parade uniform (PDP: PDU Danup, PDU Danpas)
- service uniform (PDH: with uniform, and without uniform)
- field uniform (PDL: PDL-I, PDL-II which are PDL-II Two Tone, PDL-II Brimob Camo, PDL-II Black, PDL-II Reconnaissance, PDL-II Cavalry, PDL-II Highway Patrol, PDL-II Marine and Air Police)

Ceremonial and service uniform are equipped with gorget paches (officially called "Monogram"). Higher officers (Brigadier General above) wear red while the rest wear dark brown.

Field and service uniform are equipped with office badge on left sleeve, and corps badge on the right sleeve. Officer with command held wears his/her DUI (Lencana Tanda Jabatan) on the right pocket of the dress or service uniform and usually carries baton (called tongkat komando) while others don't.

Headgears and beret colors:

- Red - Criminal Investigation Units ("Reserse", from Dutch word recherche) - don't wear berets during investigative work. They sometimes wear white dress shirt with red tie.
- Dark Blue beret - Mobile Brigade Corps (Brimob)
- Blackish Dark Brown beret - "Sabhara"
- Light Blue beret - Internal Affairs Division (Police Provosts)
- White Peaked cap with blue and white Sillitoe tartan - Traffic Police
- Navy Blue - Marine and Air Police

== National Police Pledge (Tribrata) ==
The National Police Pledge is a pledge of loyalty and fidelity of all sworn personnel and constables to the government and people of Indonesia, the principles of nationhood and the Constitution.

Original Indonesian	English
Kami, Polisi Indonesia:	We, (policemen and women) of Indonesia:
1. Berbakti kepada nusa dan bangsa dengan penuh ketakwaan terhadap Tuhan yang Maha Esa.	Swear therefore our loyalty to serve the people and nation with full reverence to the One True God,
2. Menjunjung tinggi kebenaran, keadilan dan kemanusiaan dalam menegakkan hukum negara kesatuan Republik Indonesia yang berdasarkan Pancasila dan undang-undang dasar 1945.	to uphold the values of truth, justice and humanity in our duties in the protection of the laws of the unitary Republic of Indonesia, based on Pancasila and the 1945 Constitution,
3. Senantiasa melindungi, mengayomi dan melayani masyarakat dengan keikhlasan untuk mewujudkan keamanan dan ketertiban.	and to always protect, preserve and serve to the community with sincerity in order to develop public order and security.

== Personnel ==
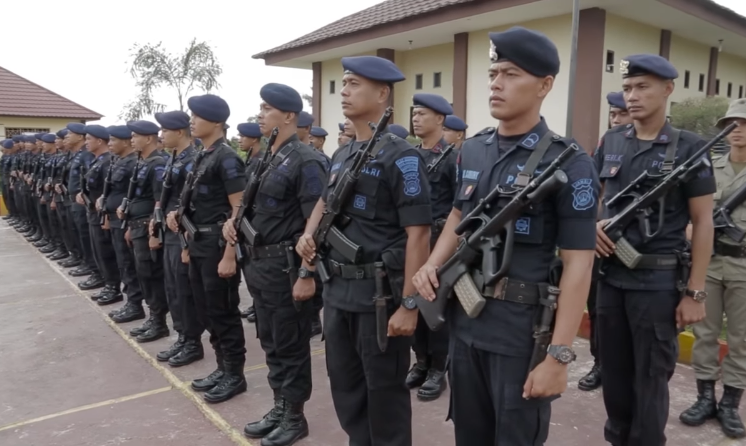
Brimob personnel

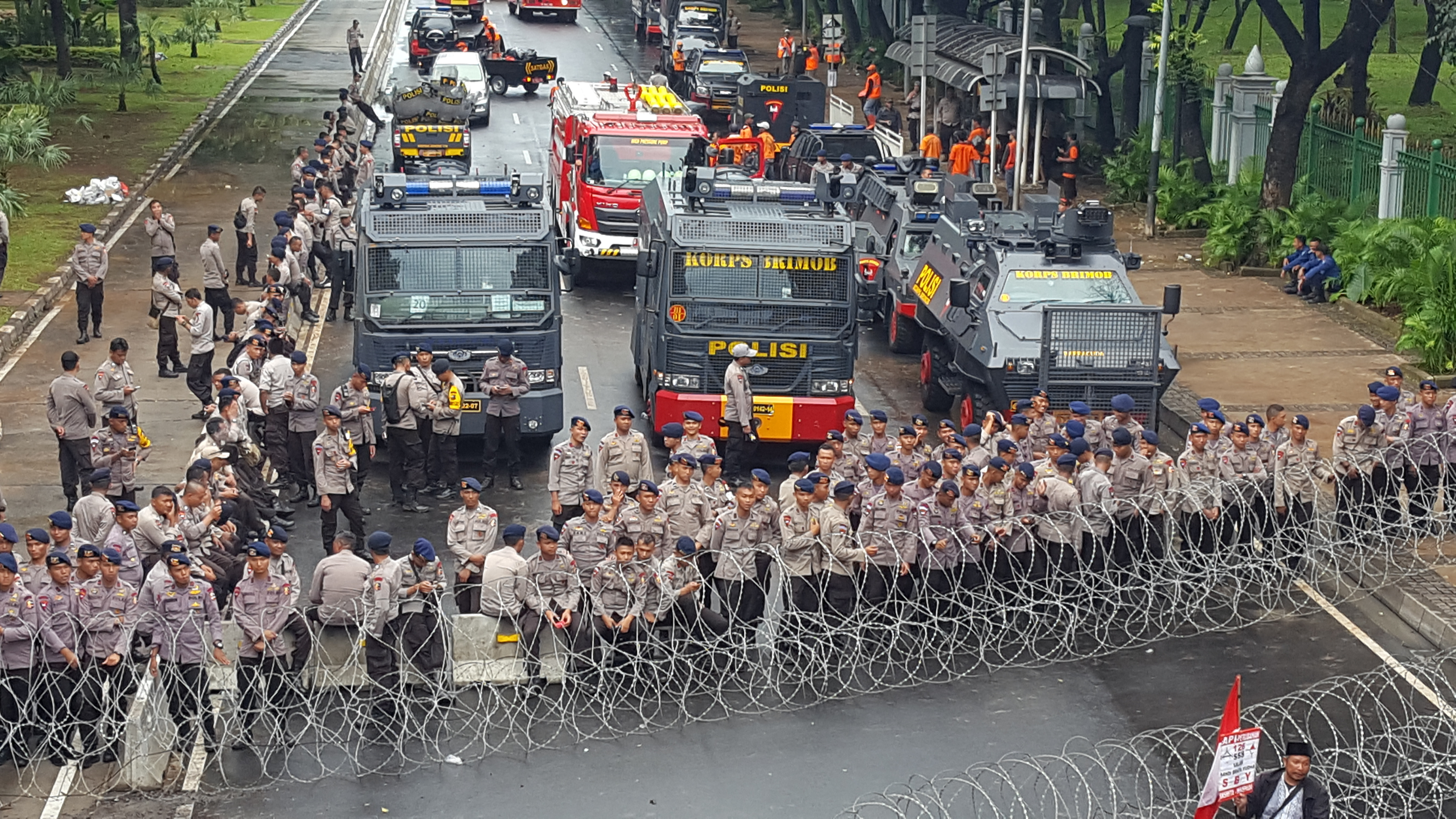
Brimob personnel during Riot control

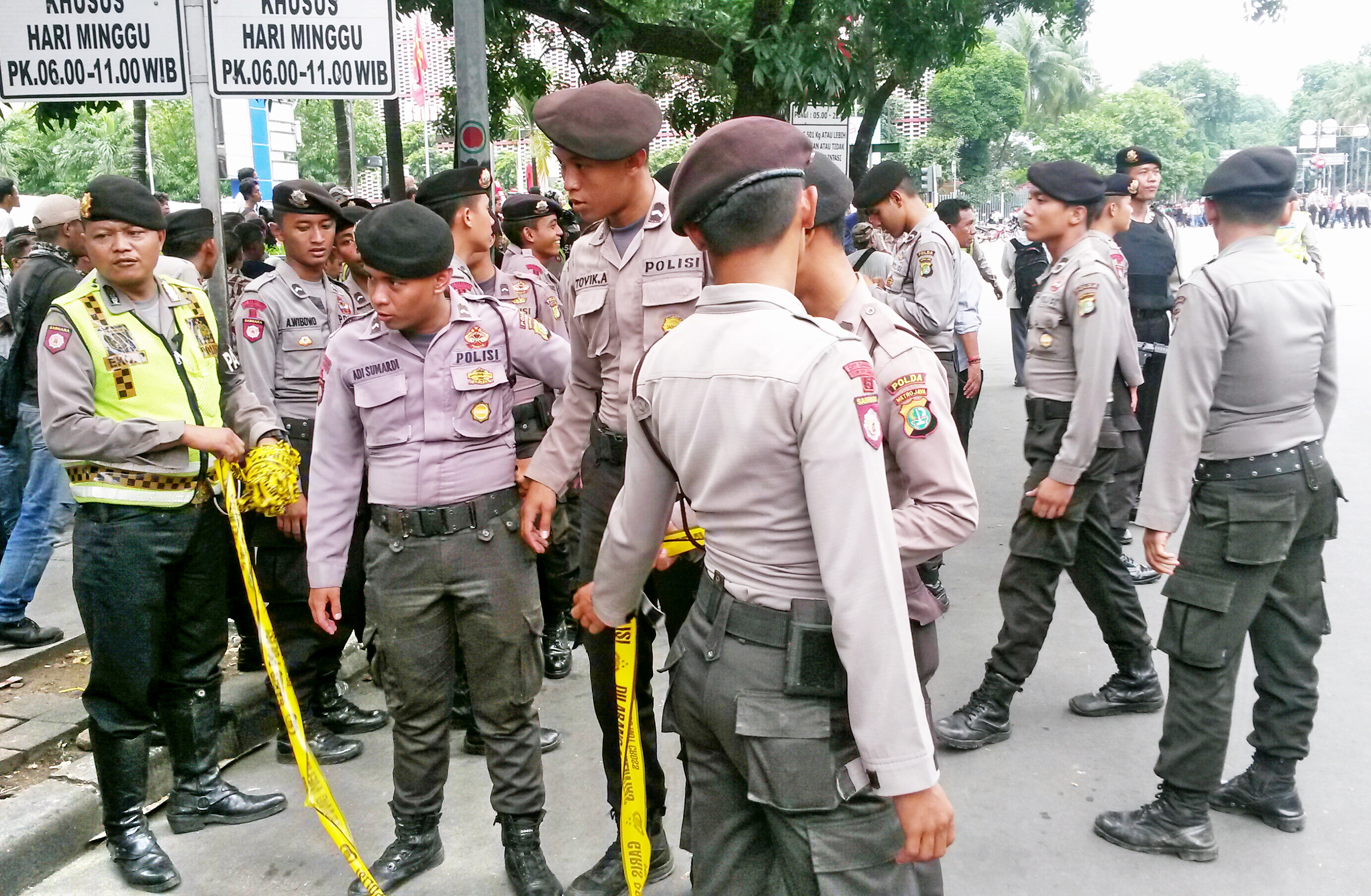
Sabhara personnel

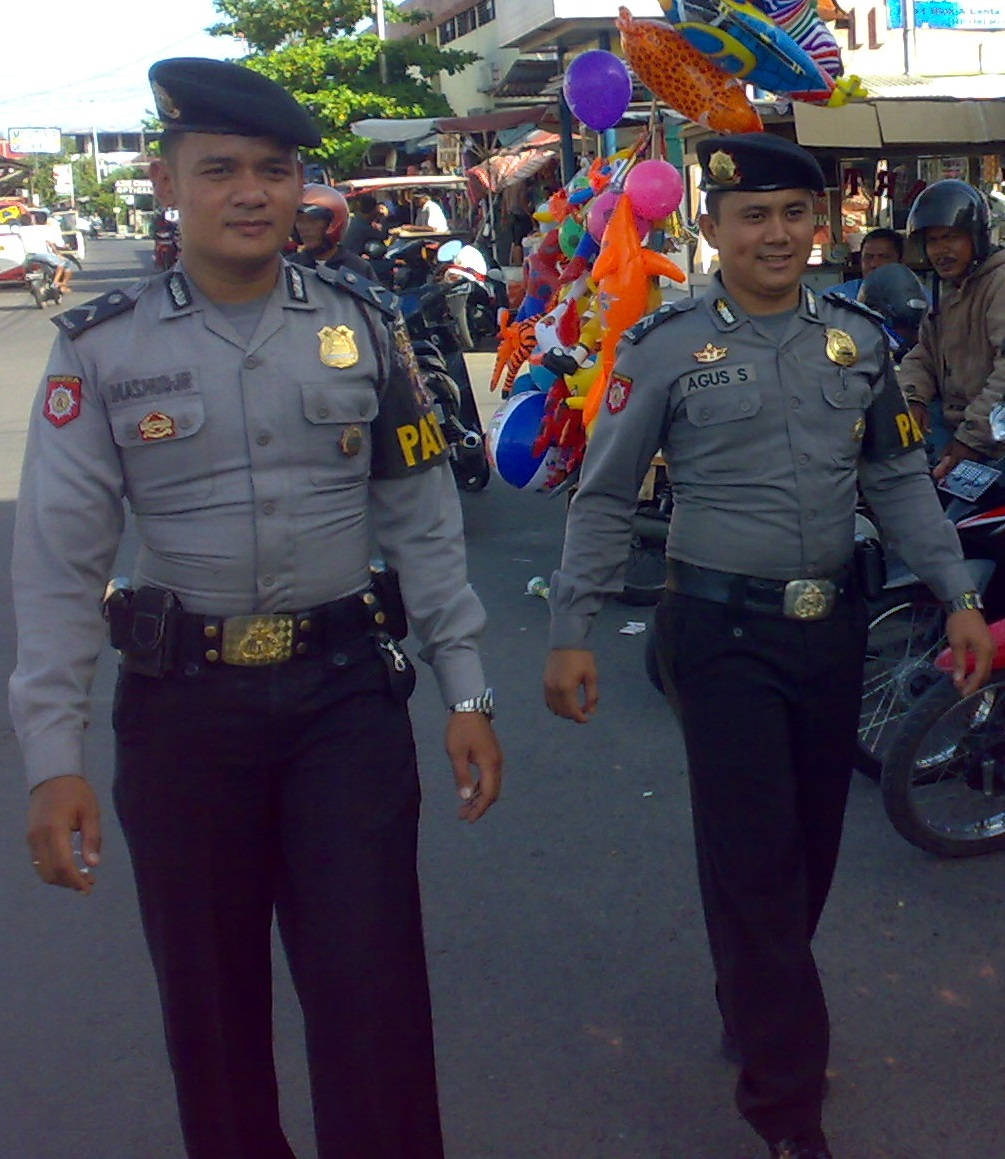
Sabhara Patrolmen

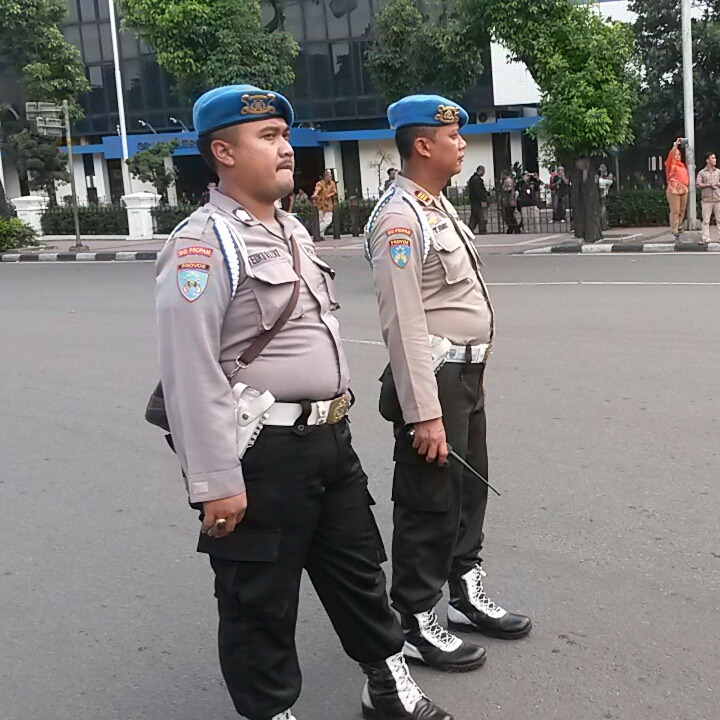
Internal Affairs officers (known locally as Police Provosts)

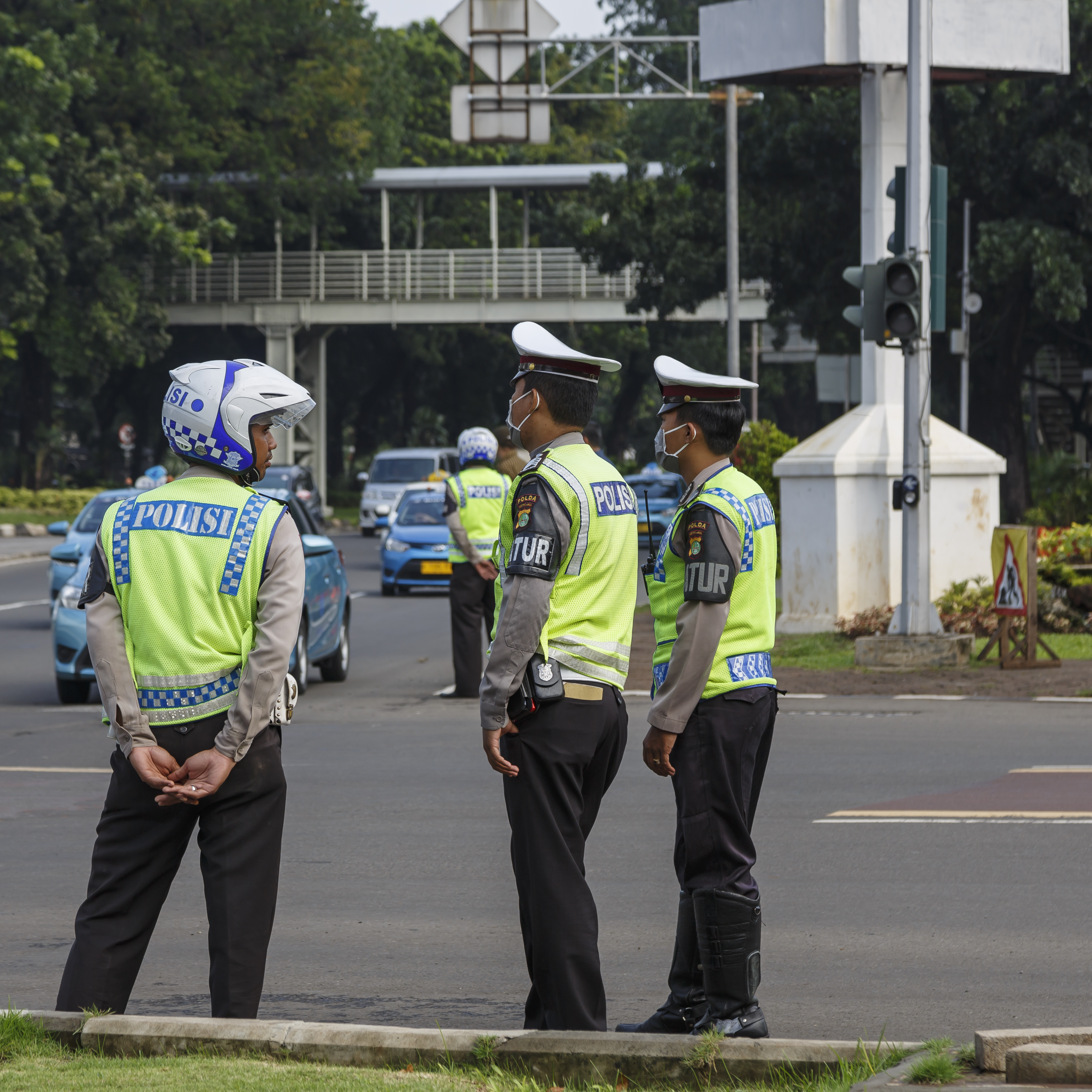
Traffic Policemen

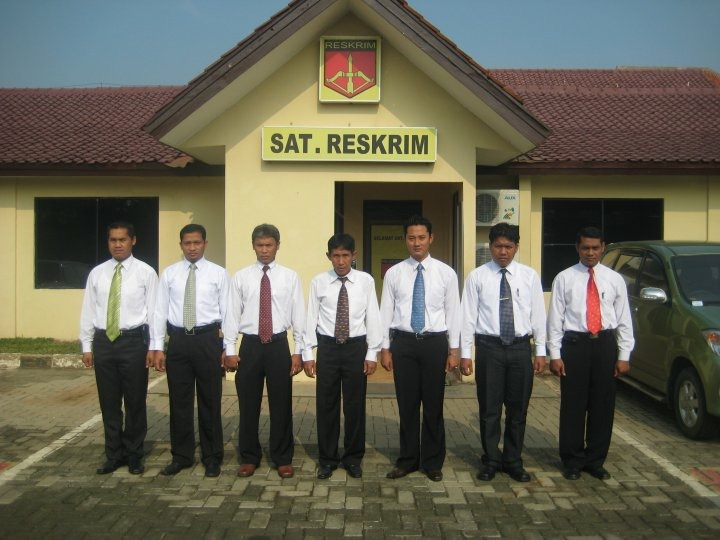
Criminal Detective Unit personnel

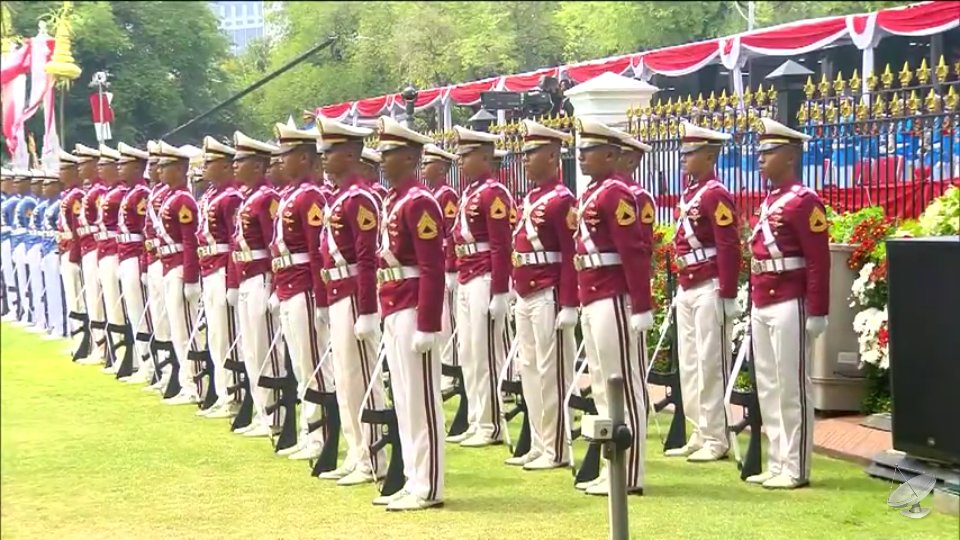
Police Academy Cadets

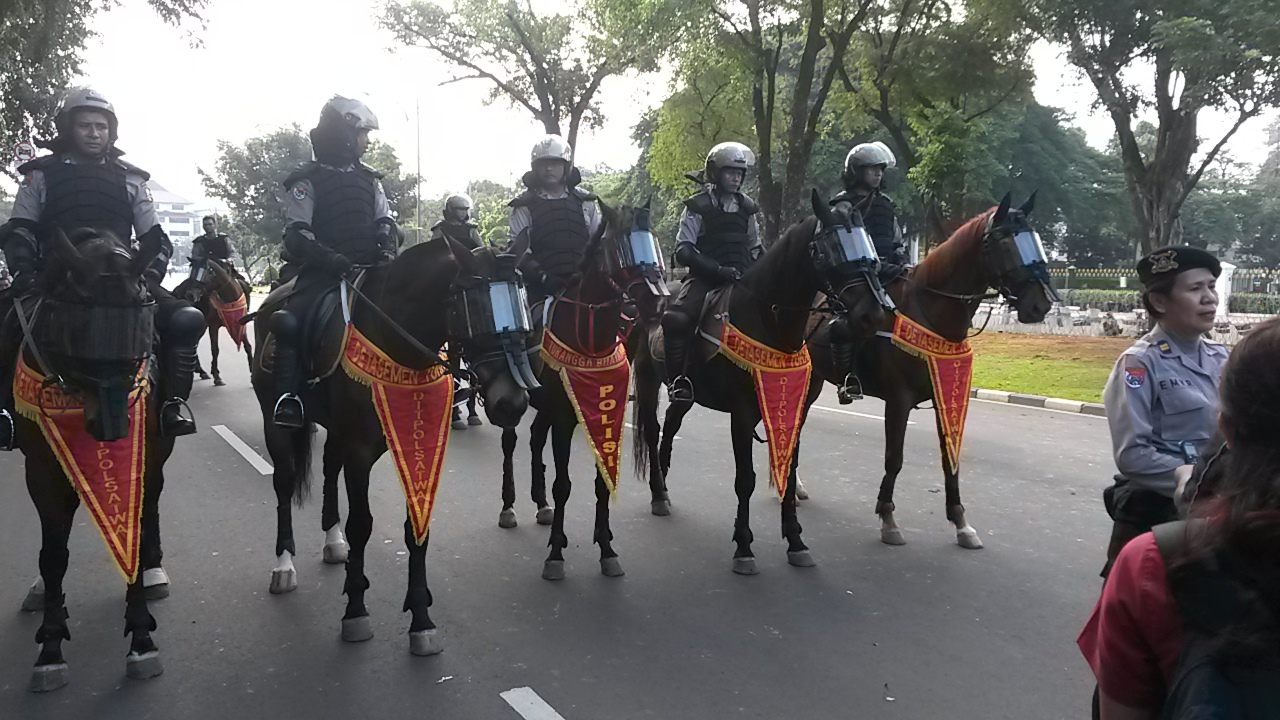
Mounted Police

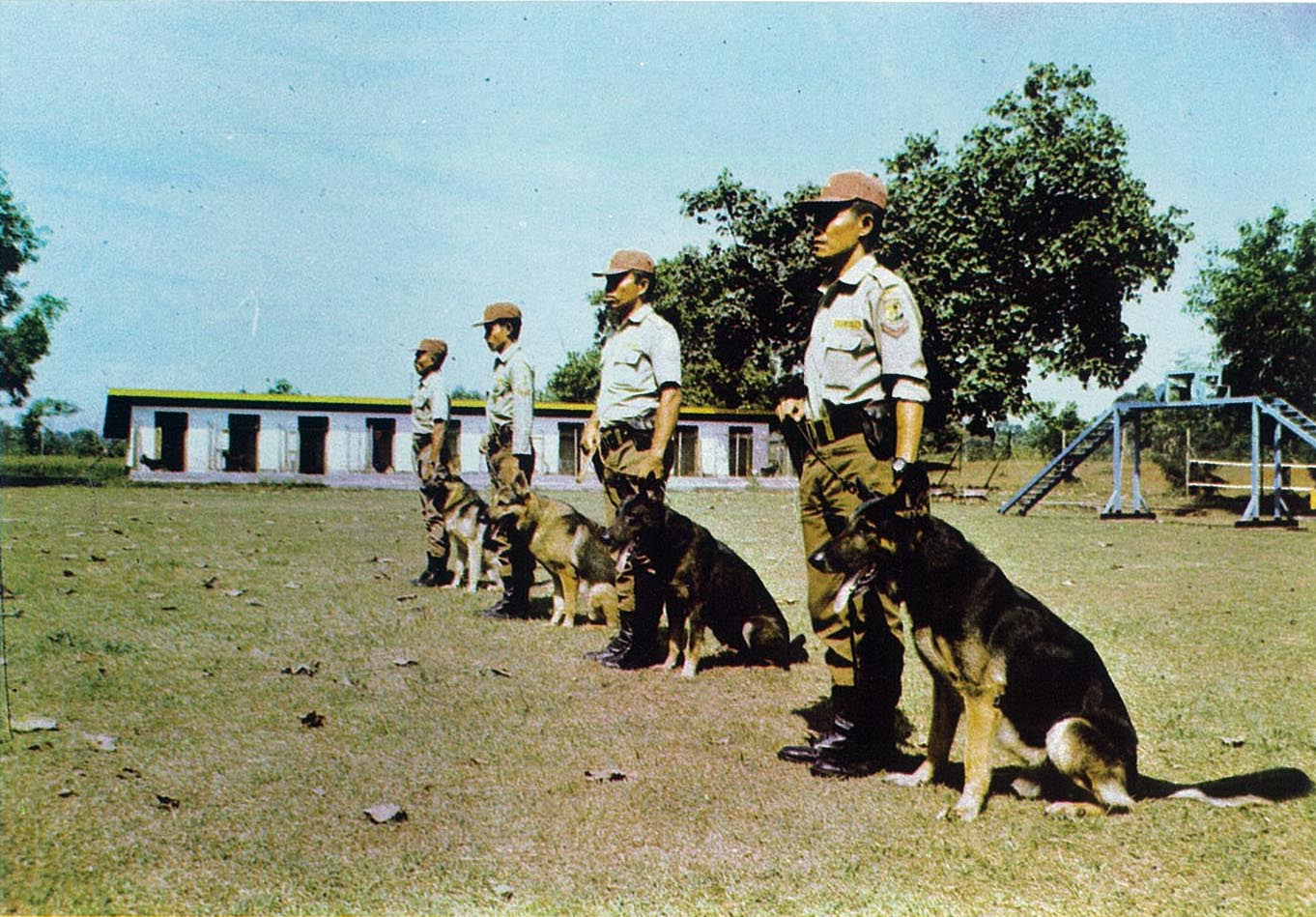
K9 Policemen circa 1970s

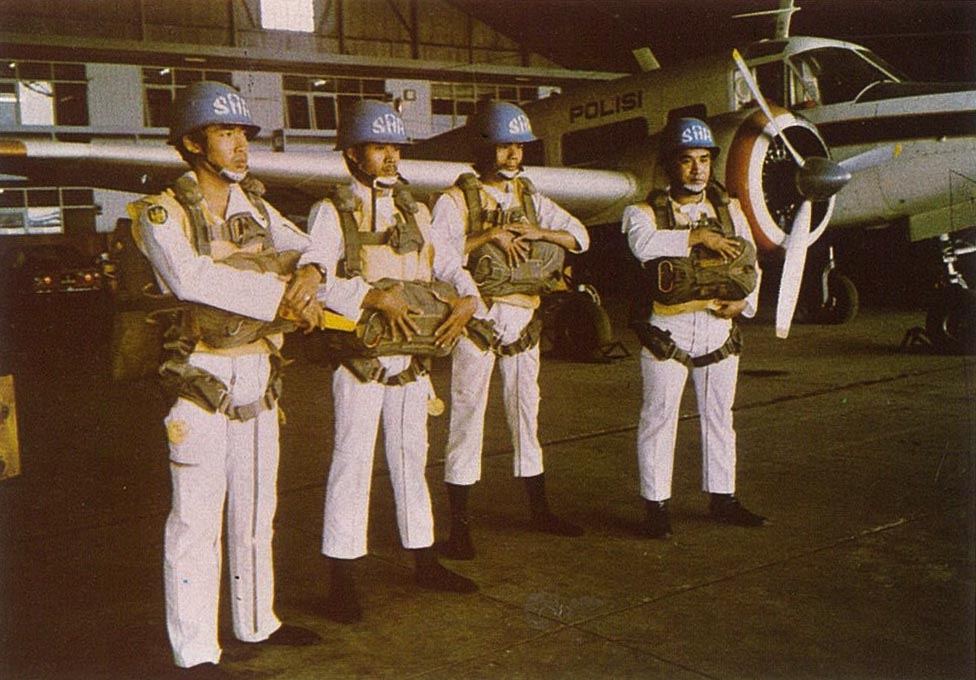
Police Aviation personnel

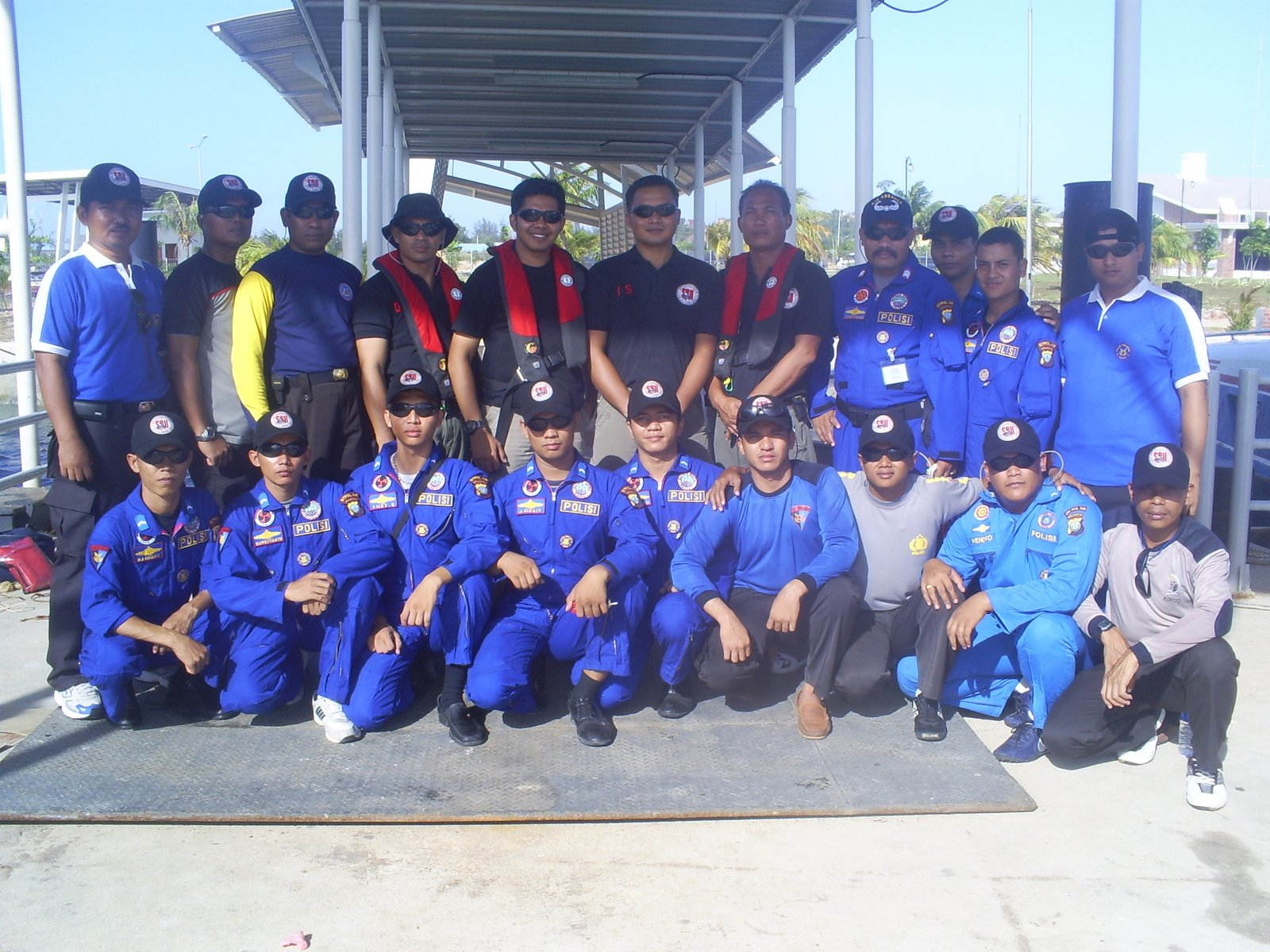
Water Policemen

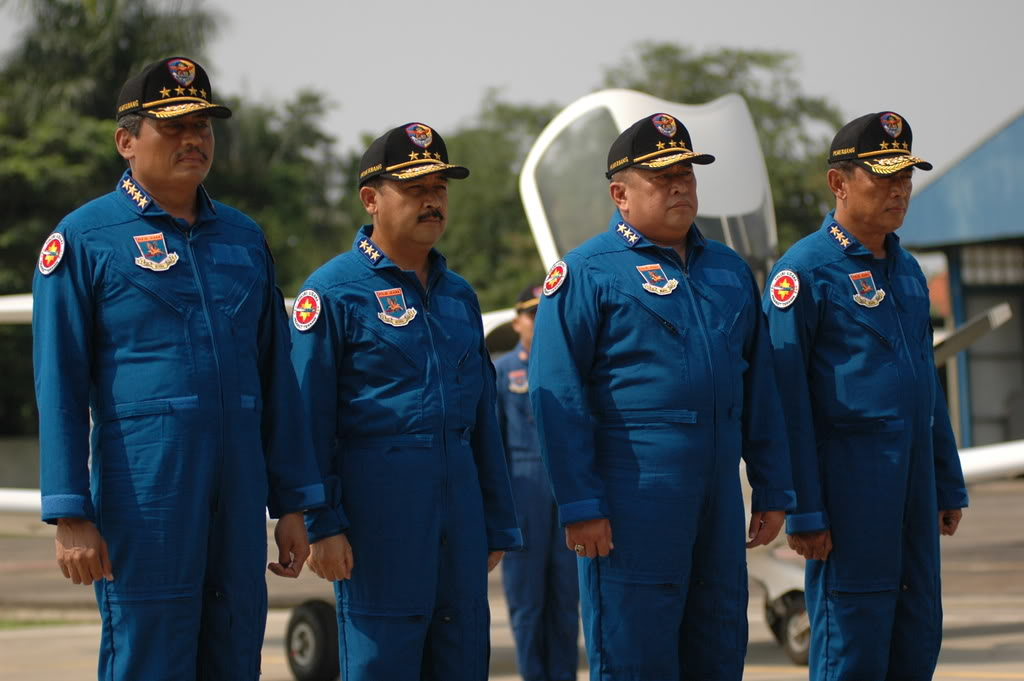
Police Aviation officers

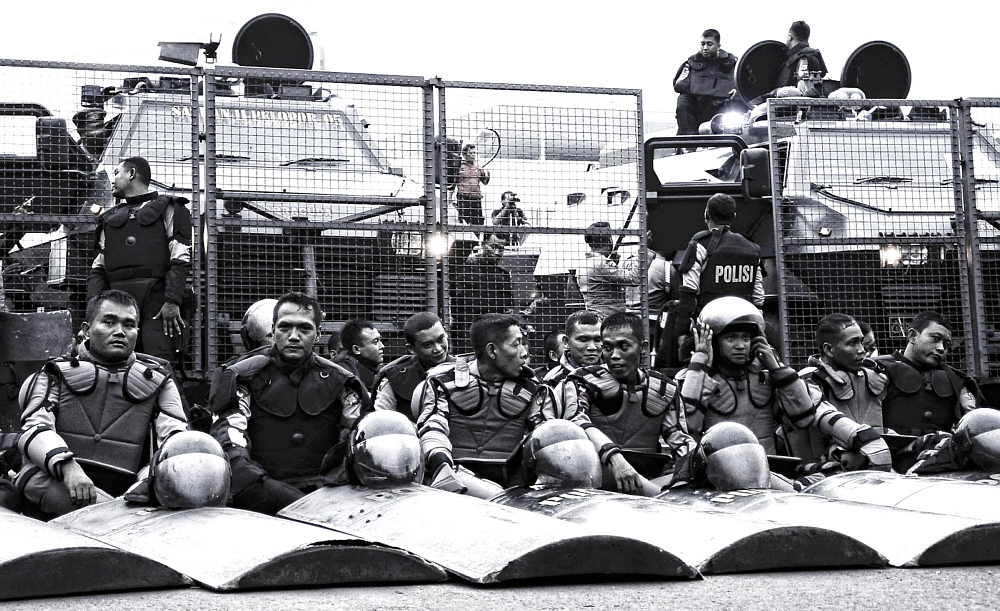
Brimob Riot control personnel

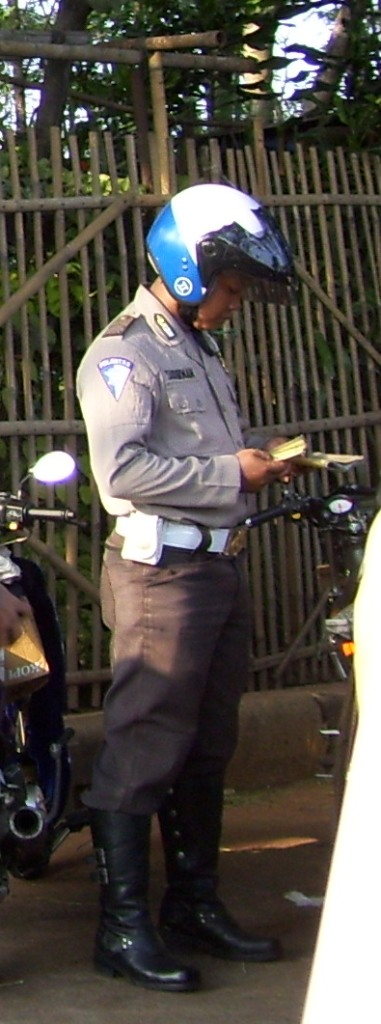
Motorcycle Traffic policeman

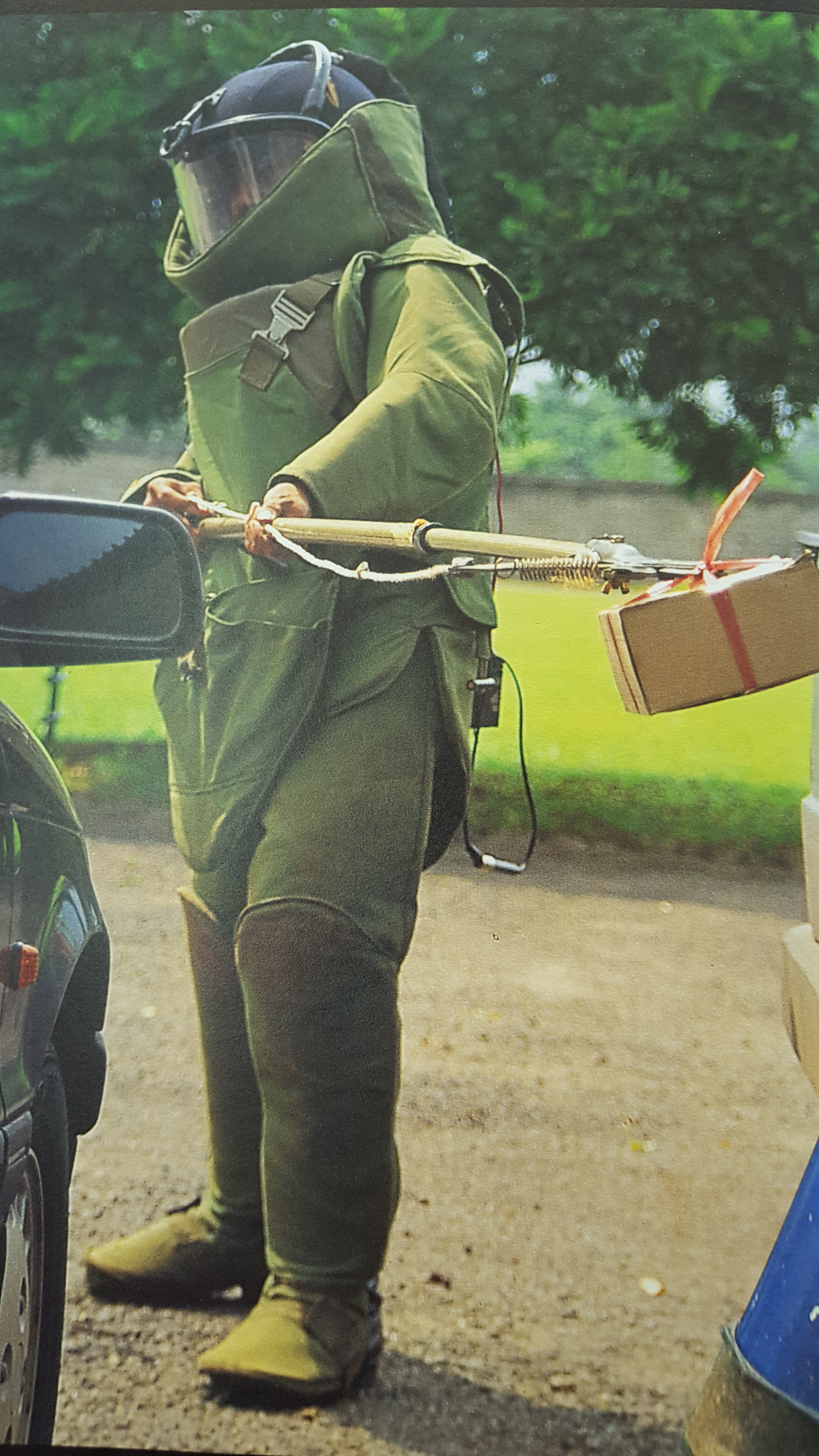
Gegana Bomb Disposal operator

== In popular culture ==
=== Film ===
- Menumpas Teroris, 1986 - starring Barry Prima and El Manik
- Arie Hanggara, 1985 - A true story of the death of an 8-year-old boy by his stepmother starring Deddy Mizwar
- The Police, 2009 - starring Vino G. Bastian
- The Raid, 2011 - starring Iko Uwais, Joe Taslim and Donny Alamsyah
- Java Heat, 2013 - starring Kellan Lutz, Ario Bayu and Mickey Rourke
- 22 Minutes, 2018 - starring Ario Bayu
- Sayap Sayap Patah, 2022 - Based from 2018 Mako Brimob standoff starring Nicholas Saputra and Ariel Tatum

=== Television ===
- 86 - 2014–2024 (based on show Cops), shown on NET TV every Monday to Friday at 6 am Western Indonesian Time
- The Police, every day at 11 pm Western Indonesian Time on Trans 7
- Cleansing Kalijodo, 2016. Starring Ario Bayu (as then-Chief of Penjaringan Sectoral Police Police Captain Krishna Murti) and Fauzi Baadila (as Daeng Aziz) on Crime + Investigation

== See also ==
- Indonesian Military (TNI)
- Criminal Investigation Agency (Bareskrim)
- Mobile Brigade Corps (Brimob)
- Detachment 88 (Densus 88)
- Gegana
- Municipal Police (Indonesia)
- Military Police Corps (Indonesia)
- Army Military Police Corps (Indonesia)
