= State Intelligence Agency (Indonesia) =

Primary intelligence agency of Indonesia

- Badan Intelijen Negara
- Seal of the State Intelligence Agency

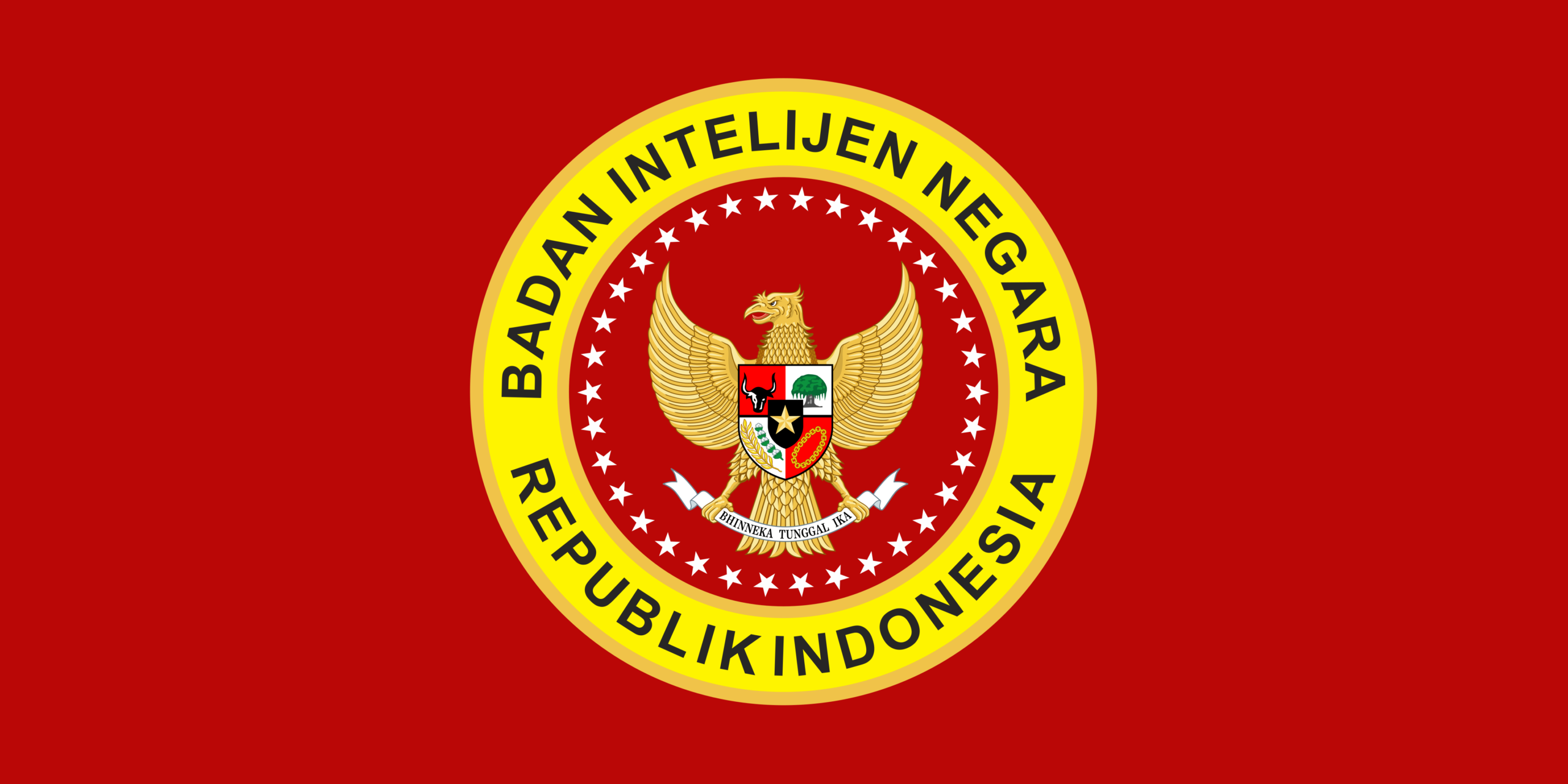
- Flag of the State Intelligence Agency

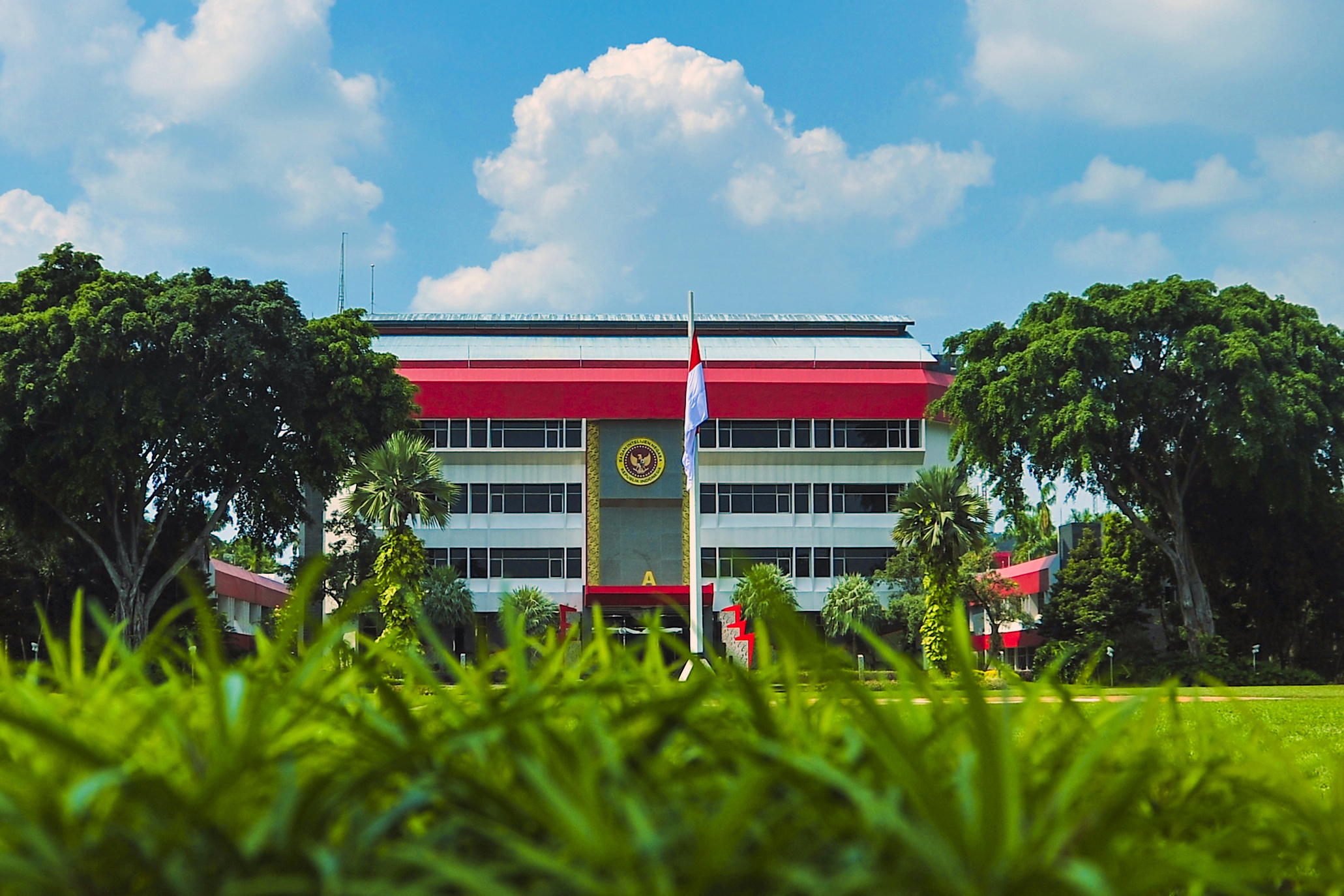
- State Intelligence Agency headquarters

Agency overview
- Formed: (no official date)
- Jurisdiction: Indonesia
- Headquarters: Jl. Seno Raya, Pejaten Timur, Pasar Minggu. South Jakarta, Indonesia
- Employees: Classified
- Annual budget: Rp 10 trillion (US$480 million) (2020)
- Agency executive: Muhammad Herindra, Chief (Kepala)
- Website: www.bin.go.id

The State Intelligence Agency (Indonesian: Badan Intelijen Negara), commonly referred to as BIN, is Indonesia's primary intelligence agency. The BIN is also responsible for coordinating intelligence activities among various intelligence agencies, including military intelligence, police intelligence, prosecutors intelligence and other relevant entities. The agency's operational mandate is based on Article 30 of Law No.17/2011.

Prior to 2001, it was known as Bakin (Badan Koordinasi Intelijen Negara, "State Intelligence Coordinating Agency"); its name change was a result of restructuring in the agency. At the time of its name change in 2001, the BIN's role in co-ordinating interagency operations was de-emphasised. However, in the wake of the 2002 Bali bombing, its co-ordinating function was re-strengthened as part of a general expansion of the agency's mandate, which included an expanded budget. BIN is headed by a "minister-level officer" as a part of the national cabinet; since 21 October 2024, the agency is currently headed by Muhammad Herindra.

BIN has been the subject of criticism from human rights groups for its treatment of dissidents and human rights advocates in Indonesia and lack of accountability, as even the Indonesian government is unaware about their activity.

== History ==
=== 1943–1965 ===
The origins of the agency are rooted in the Japanese occupation of Indonesia. In 1943, Japan established an intelligence organisation known as the Nakano School. One of its graduates was Colonel Zulkifli Lubis, who would go on to lead Indonesia's first intelligence agency.

After declaring independence in 1945, the Government of Indonesia established its first intelligence agency, called Badan Istimewa. Colonel Lubis returned to lead the agency, as did about 40 former special military investigators. After undergoing special intelligence training period in the Ambarawa region, around 30 young men became members of the Indonesian State Secrets Agency (BRANI) in early May 1946. This agency would go on to become an umbrella organization for the Indonesian intelligence community.

In July 1946, Minister of Defense Amir Sjarifuddin formed "Defense Agency B", which was headed by a former police commissioner. On 30 April 1947 all intelligence agencies, including the BRANI, were merged into the Ministry of Defense to become part of Defense Agency B.

In 1949, Indonesian Minister of Defense Sri Sultan Hamengkuwono IX was not satisfied with the performance of the Indonesian intelligence community, as it operated independently and was considered poorly coordinated. Hamengkubuwono formed the Special Service or DC, also known by the pseudonym Ksatria Graha. The DC was intended to be able to respond to future issues of Indonesian security. The recruitment program was the first Indonesian intelligence program involving non-military personnel trained by the United States Central Intelligence Agency. Candidates for the DC were sent to Saipan for training until the DC restarted training in Indonesia. DC agents participated in various clandestine operations such as Operations Trikora and Dwikora, as well as the massacre of suspected members of the Communist Party.

In early 1952, the Chief of Staff of the Armed Forces, T. B. Simatupang, demoted the intelligence agency to the Badan Informasi Staff Angkatan Perang (Armed Forces Staff Information Agency). During 1952–1958, due to competition within the military, the various military branches and police each had their own intelligence services without national coordination. As a result, on 5 December 1958, President Sukarno formed the Intelligence Coordinating Body (BKI) with Colonel Laut Pirngadi as the head.

On 10 November 1959, the BKI was again reorganized into the Central Intelligence Agency (BPI), headquartered at Jalan Madiun and headed by Dr. Soebandrio. From the 1960s until the beginning of the New Order, Soebandrio's influence on the BPI was particularly strong, especially amidst internal conflict between left- and right-wing factions of the armed forces.

=== 1965–present ===
After the 1965 upheaval, Suharto headed Kopkamtib (Operasi Pemulihan Keamanan dan Ketertiban, "Operational Command for Restoring Security and Order"). Subsequently, an Intelligence Task Force was formed in each region. On 22 August 1966, Suharto established the State Intelligence Command (KIN), headed by Brigadier General Yoga Sugomo and directly responsible to Suharto.

As a strategic intelligence agency, BPI was merged into KIN; KIN also had Special Operations Opsus under Lt. Col. Ali Moertopo and assistants Leonardus Benyamin (Benny) Moerdani and Aloysius Sugiyanto. On 22 May 1967, less than a year later, Suharto issued a Presidential Decre to redesign KIN as BAKIN (Badan Koordinasi Intelijen Negara, "State Intelligence Coordinating Agency"). Major General Soedirgo was appointed as the first head of BAKIN.

Under Major General Sutopo Juwono, BAKIN had Deputy II, which was under Colonel Nicklany Soedardjo, a military police officer who graduated from Fort Gordon, US. In early 1965, Soedardjo created the PM's intelligence unit, Detasemen Pelaksana Intelijen or Den Pintel POM. Officially, Den Pintel POM was Special Intelligence Unit Satsus Intel, then in 1976 it became Implementing Unit Satlak' and in the 1980s it became the Implementing Unit 01.

Starting in 1970, there was a reorganization of BAKIN, Deputy III was added as an Opsus post under Brigadier General TNI Ali Moertopo, a Suharto insider. Opsus is considered the most prestigious posting in BAKIN, involved in events ranging from Penantuan Pendapat Rakyat of West Irian and the birth of the Golongan Karya (Golkar) to the Indochina issue. In 1983, as Deputy Head of BAKIN, L. B. Moerdani expanded intelligence activities and BAKIN became BAIS (Badan Intelijen Negara, "Strategic Intelligence Agency"). Afterwards, BAKIN remained as a contra-subversion directorate of the New Order.

After removing Moerdani as Minister of Defense and Security, in 1993 Suharto reduced BAIS's mandate and changed its name to BAI (Badan Intelijen ABRI, "ABRI Intelligence Agency"). In 2000, President Abdurrahman Wahid changed BAKIN to BIN (Badan Intelijen Negara, "State Intelligence Agency"), which it remains.

Thus, since 1945, the state intelligence organization has changed its name six times:

1. BRANI (Badan Rahasia Negara Indonesia, "Indonesian State Secrets Agency")
2. BKI (Badan Koordinasi Intelijen, "Intelligence Coordination Agency")
3. BPI (Badan Pusat Intelijen, "Central Intelligence Agency")
4. KIN (Komando Intelijen Negara, "State Intelligence Command")
5. BAKIN (Badan Koordinasi Intelijen Negara, "State Intelligence Coordination Agency")
6. BIN (Badan Intelijen Negara, "State Intelligence Agency")

== Organizational structure ==
BIN's previous seal

=== Main organization ===
The organisational structure is mainly based on Presidential Regulation No. 90/2012 (State Intelligence Agency). The organizational structure was last amended by Presidential Regulation No. 79/2020 (Second Amendment of Presidential Regulation No. 90/2012 Re: State Intelligence Agency), signed on 20 July 2020. Under the Presidential Regulation, BIN's organisational structure consists of nine deputies, which was later expanded by Chief BIN Regulation No. 1/2022:

- Chief
- Deputy Chief
- Main Secretariat:
- Deputy of Foreign Affairs (Deputy I):
- Deputy of Home Affairs (Deputy II):
- Deputy of Counter Intelligence (Deputy III):
- Deputy of Economy (Deputy IV):
- Deputy for Technology Intelligence (Deputy V):
- Deputy for Cyber Intelligence (Deputy VI):
- Deputy Communication and Information (Deputy VII):
- Deputy Apparatuses Security Intelligence (Deputy VIII):
- Deputy Intelligence Analysis and Production (Deputy IX):
- Main Inspectorate:
- Expert Staffs:
  - Political and Ideology
  - Social and Culture
  - Law and Human Rights
  - Defense and Security
  - Natural Resources and Environment
- Centers:
  - Intelligence Professional Development Center
  - Research and Development Center
  - Education and Training Center
  - Medical Intelligence Center
  - Psychology Center
- Regional BIN Offices
- Extraterritorial BIN Representative Offices
- State Intelligence College
- State Intelligence Museum
- Task forces

=== Training facility ===
BIN possesses a primary education and training facility called STIN (Sekolah Tinggi Intelijen Negara, "State Intelligence College"). It has undergraduate, master, and doctoral level educational programs for intelligence in Indonesia. All STIN graduates will become part of BIN human resources after graduation. During the COVID-19 pandemic, in September 2020 Budi Gunawan announced that STIN would open a Medical Intelligence program. In April 2021, STIN opened their Medical Intelligence program, and expanded other programs under STIN.

Aside from STIN, BIN possesses another education and training facility called Education and Training Center, under the Main Secretariat office. Unlike training provided by STIN, training at the Education and Training Center is more specialised.

=== Para-commando unit ===
BIN also possesses at least one para-commando force unit. A unit codenamed "Rajawali" (Eagle) was disclosed by Bambang Soesatyo, Speaker of People's Consultative Assembly. The existence of the unit surprised many Indonesians. The unit is signified by black full-body clad military attire, similar to Koopsus combat attire. In the press release, BIN acknowledged that Rajawali Force is a BIN force specially trained in "special threats handling and deterrence". BIN also said that the unit does not have any specific names, as it changes annually. Most other details of the unit remain undisclosed.

=== Mandate ===
The BIN is tasked to conduct the following missions:

- Conducting studies and formulating national intelligence sector policies
- Delivering intelligence products as material for consideration in determining government policies
- Planning and implementing intelligence activities
- Making recommendations related to foreign individuals and/or institutions
- Providing considerations, suggestions and recommendations related to the security of the government administration

== Activities ==
- In the late 1960s to 1970s when BIN was still called BAKIN, Colonel Nicklany who at that time served as head of deputy II of BAKIN, asked for help from the CIA, MI6, and MOSSAD to train a new BAKIN unit called Satsus Intel (satuan khusus intelijen/special intelligence unit) which was tasked with handling foreign counterintelligence, namely catching foreign spies operating in Indonesia especially from communist countries, even though Indonesia does not have diplomatic relations with Israel, Nicklany did not care about this and said: "We will bring in these Israeli instructors because they are the best in world," according to Israeli officials interviewed in 2007.
- In September 1973, intelligence task force Satsus Intel drew up plans to permanently station a team at Jakarta's Kemayoran Airport. The team soon began archiving color photographs of Arab passports from over a dozen nations and comparing the names to a terrorist watchlist compiled by foreign intelligence services. Especially suspicious of Yemen, BIN conducted surveillance on the Yemeni consulate for almost a decade but never found important information and, despite fears, communism was not spread to Indonesia.
- In 1982, BIN and Kopkamtib captured Alexander Pavlovich Vinenko, a GRU agent posing as an Aeroflot manager in Jakarta, and Lieutenant Colonel Sergei Egorov, the Soviet assistant military attaché. Lieutenant Colonel Susdaryanto, an Indonesian navy officer, assisted in their capture after previously being arrested by BIN for selling information about Indonesian seas and the navy to the Soviets. However, political pressure from the Soviets led to their release with persona non grata status. Susdaryanto continued working with BIN to uncover other Soviet spies.
- In 2002, BIN, in coordination with Kopassus's Anti-Terror unit Sat-81, successfully captured Islamist militant Omar al-Faruq. He was later handed over to US authorities.
- In early 2002, BIN was derided by ministers and senior politicians when it emerged that it had written separate, and contradictory, reports on the economy for cabinet ministers and for a parliamentary committee. BIN also prepared an error-filled briefing for parliament's Foreign Affairs and Security Commission prior to John Howard's visit to Indonesia in February 2002. The briefing alleged that Australia's Lieutenant general Peter Cosgrove had written an autobiography denigrating Indonesia's role in East Timor. The briefing also asserted that the Howard government had formed a secret twelve-person committee to engineer Papua's secession from Indonesia.
- In 2004, retiring chief of BIN, General Abdullah Mahmud Hendropriyono, admitted that Indonesia had wiretapped the Australian embassy in Jakarta during the 1999 East Timorese crisis and has tried to recruit Australian spies, and former intelligence service officer David Reed suspects that Indonesian intelligence has succeeded in infiltrating ASIS.
- In 2005, BIN was found to have used the charitable foundation of former Indonesian president Abdurrahman Wahid to hire a Washington lobbying firm to pressure the US government for a full restart of military training programs in Indonesia.
- A United States diplomatic cables leak suggested that BIN was involved in the poisoning of Indonesian human rights activist Munir Said Thalib on board a Garuda Indonesia flight from Jakarta to Amsterdam. Top level BIN officials were implicated in his murder, and a BIN deputy chairman, Muchdi Purwopranjono, was tried for the assassination attempt and acquitted; his trial was internationally condemned as a "sham trial". In 2014, former BIN chief A.M Hendropriyono admitted that he bore "command responsibility" for the assassination, and he was prepared to be tried.
- In 2013, Tempo and ABC News (Australia) reported that Indonesian intelligence had long been know of foreign spying and used the Australia–Indonesia spying scandal to gain leverage. Between 2000 and 2013, BIN, BAIS, and Indonesian police were said to have run counterintelligence operations that exposed and disrupted foreign agents, Foreign agent operations include wiretapping, local recruitment, and bribing Indonesian officials to obtain secret information and to facilitate the interests of foreign countries, The agents who were arrested came from western countries, Asia, and Indonesia neighbors, such as the United States of America, China and Australia. Indonesia often expelling them discreetly while exploiting the incidents to find out the methods of foreign intelligence operations, blackmail foreign countries, and strengthen Indonesia’s position.
- In 2018, there are reports that BIN purchased spyware from Israeli-founded companies, including Pegasus. Activists fear its potential use for political purposes, and even the supervising House of Representatives was unaware of this.
- In September 2021, not long after the Taliban took control of Afghanistan, Deputy VII of BIN, Wawan Hari Purwanto, said that they continued to communicate with the Taliban to prevent terrorism from reaching Indonesia. BIN also continued monitoring groups with ties to the Taliban, and was communicating with former Indonesian fighters who had joined the Mujahideen in the Soviet–Afghan War to prevent acts of terrorism in Indonesia.
- In October 2021, the Dutch newspaper de Volkskrant published an interview with a Dutch national referred to as "Eduard", who claimed to have operated as a covert agent for both the Dutch AIVD and the American CIA in Indonesia following the 2002 Bali bombings. According to Eduard, his role involved infiltrating Islamist extremist groups, and intelligence he provided contributed to the deaths of Azahari Husin, Amrozi, and Bahrun Naim. He alleged that after leaving the intelligence services in 2019, he began receiving death threats, including from unknown individuals using a phone he had once used to contact radical groups. Despite discarding the phone, the threats continued via social media and through in-person visits to his business. Fearing for his family's safety, he relocated to the Netherlands and shut down his operations. Eduard further claimed that Indonesia’s State Intelligence Agency (BIN) may have uncovered his identity and compromised elements of the AIVD’s and CIA network in the region. He stated that both the AIVD and CIA declined to offer protection despite prior assurances, leaving him and his family without support.
- In September 2023, Kompas reported on leaked documents allegedly detailing U.S. efforts to influence the 2024 Indonesian general election through funding from the National Endowment for Democracy (NED) and the United States Agency for International Development (USAID). According to the report, the documents claimed that more than 2,000 institutions worldwide, some based in Indonesia, receive annual funding from NED. The documents also said that the U.S. government was concerned about the possible election of Prabowo Subianto, citing fears that his presidency could undermine American interests and strengthen China’s influence in the region. One unnamed senior official at the U.S. Embassy in Jakarta was reportedly warned by Indonesia’s State Intelligence Agency (BIN) not to interfere in the election. Following Prabowo’s eventual electoral victory in 2024, BIN was said to have been aware of the activities of NED and USAID and had taken preventative and counter-narrative measures.
- In November 2026, BIN was involved in the investigation and arrest of several Indonesian officials wiretapping cases including the Indonesian president and an alleged coup attempts against the president allegedly carried out by several high-ranking Indonesian police officers, both active and retired, the perpetrators used the Lawful Interception Management System to conduct the wiretapping, currently four active and retired generals are named as suspects, the suspects are Listyo Sigit Prabowo, the former head of the Indonesian national police, Inspector General Ahrie Sonta Nasution serving as the chief of the legal division of the Indonesian National Police, Inspector General Eko Hadi Santoso, and Inspector General Slamet Uliandi, all were arrested except Slamet Uliandi because of illness, Many Indonesian officials and figures believe that this is part of a large conspiracy that not only involves parties within the country but also abroad. now the trial has been held for the perpetrators of the wiretapping, and this case is still being investigated further.
- In November 2026, BIN conducted a joint operation with other Indonesian intelligence agencies to arrest a Malaysian Youtuber and content creator, Isa Isarb and his friends and accused them of espionage or individuals who received money from certain parties to corner other countries, from the investigation it was discovered that he participated in demonstrations in Indonesia with a tourist visa and had contact and communication with the deputy prime minister of Malaysia, members of the Malaysian parliament such as Syed Saddiq and also the Malaysian communications minister, the content creator confirmed all accusations but denied espionage and said that he and his friends came to Indonesia only to make documentation about the haze that occurred in Kalimantan and communicate with Malaysian officials only to discuss the situation that occurred, He and his friends face up to 20 years in prison or the death penalty if found guilty of espionage. But after six days of being detained and interrogated by the Indonesian authority, the content creator and his friends was finally released after the Malaysian government negotiated with the Indonesian government.

=== Australia ===
- Australian intelligence agencies have on several occasions suspected that Indonesian intelligence had attempted to infiltrate the Australian government and establish influence over high-level officials. One such case involved Captain Andrew Plunkett, an intelligence officer with the Australian Army’s 3rd Royal Australian Regiment, who accused former defence minister Kim Beazley of being compromised by Indonesian intelligence due to his alleged association with a prominent unnamed Indonesian figure. Plunkett’s claims, which included concerns over national security risks, were investigated by the Australian Security Intelligence Organisation (ASIO) ahead of the 2001 federal election, but were found to be unsubstantiated. In 2004, Beazley was again subject to speculation regarding a past relationship with Ratih Hardjono, a former journalist and embassy staff member, who was alleged to have inappropriately photographed a secure defence site and to have a familial connection to a senior officer in Indonesia’s intelligence agency BAKIN (now BIN). In July that year, journalist Greg Sheridan stated that he contacted ASIO Director Dennis Richardson regarding the classified investigation. Subsequent reports indicated that, later in July, the Attorney‑General’s Department was still reviewing the initial allegations, suggesting that Richardson’s earlier comments may have been made before all facts were confirmed. Ratih Hardjono was married to Bruce Grant in the 1990s who during this period was senior policy adviser to Gareth Evans, who at that time served as Minister for Foreign Affairs and was responsible for ASIS from 1988 to 1996, and until now the outcome of these investigations are not made public.

=== Iran ===
- In May 2023, Iranian journalist Babak Taghvaee accused Indonesian intelligence of assisting operations linked to Iran’s Quds Force. According to his claims, Indonesian airlines helped Mahan Air, an Iranian carrier affiliated with the Islamic Revolutionary Guard Corps (IRGC) and sanctioned by the United States for alleged terrorist ties, evade sanctions. Taghvaee reported that two used Airbus A340 aircraft, previously operated by the French Air and Space Force, were acquired through Indonesian and Malian front companies on behalf of Mahan Air. The aircraft were reportedly stored at Kertajati Airport in West Java for over a year before being flown to Mali under Malian registration. However, the flights were allegedly diverted to Iran, where the aircraft were re-registered. Taghvaee also claimed that Indonesian airlines may have supplied aircraft spare parts to Mahan Air, and suggested that Indonesian intelligence services were aware of—and possibly complicit in—these activities, citing what he described as long-standing ties between Indonesian intelligence and the Quds Force.

== Surveillance technology ==
In 2025, according to investigations from various media outlets worldwide, First Wap is a surveillance technology company headquartered in Jakarta, Indonesia. It was founded by former Siemens engineer Josef Fuchs in the 1999. The company primary product, Altamides, is phone-tracking software that exploits vulnerabilities in the global telecom network's SS7 protocol to pinpoint any person location worldwide. Over time, First WAP has expanded Altamides capabilities beyond location tracking to include intercepting SMS messages, listening to phone calls, and breaching encrypted messaging apps like WhatsApp. The company is said to be one of the world's first phone-tracking firms and possesses the same level of sophistication as Israeli intelligence surveillance technology, even more so than some Israeli surveillance technology. Altamides leaves no trace on the phones it targets, unlike spyware such as Pegasus. Nor does it require a target to click on a malicious link or show any of the telltale signs (such as overheating or a short battery life) of remote Monitoring.

First Wap surveillance technology has been used across more than 160 countries, tracking over 14,000 unique phone numbers. The company marketed its products to authoritarian governments and made them accessible to corporate actors through a network of middlemen. This company is subject to and under the supervision of the Indonesian government because this company is very dependent on its protection and Indonesia can use this technology for any purpose because it is basically registered as an Indonesian-owned company. Specific clients included Indonesian intelligence, Vatican, United States of America, Austria, Norway, South Africa, Nigeria, United Arab Emirates, Malaysia, Singapore, Uzbekistan, Saudi Arabia and governments in Morocco and Algeria during the Arab Spring, and even Israel. Victims of the surveillance ranged from high-profile figures including journalists, lawyers, senior corporate executives, military personnel, entrepreneurs, and artists to ordinary citizens like teachers and therapists. Indonesian intelligence can use this spyware to influence the course of world events such as there are reports that BAIS is working with Chinese intelligence, where BAIS handed over a lot of secret information about other countries to China which China then used to strengthen its influence around the world and worsening the conflict between the Global North and Global South.. Additionally the dataset revealed that, among many others, the following people had been tracked:

- Erik Prince, Blackwater founder
- Gert-René Polli, head of Austria police intelligence agency BVT
- Gianluigi Nuzzi, while reporting on a scandal at the Vatican
- Adam Ciralsky, former CIA officer and journalist
- Hamad bin Jassim bin Jaber Al Thani, Prime Minister of Qatar
- Asma al-Assad, former First Lady of Syria
- Dietrich Mateschitz, co–founder of Red bull
- Anne Wojcicki, the CEO of 23andMe and ex-wife of Sergey Brin (co-founder of Google)
- Sigve Brekke, former president and CEO of Telenor Group
- Kjell Arne Lilleas, CEO of Lilltech Defence AS of Norway company
- Roberto Casula, ex manager of Eni
- Vojin Lazarevic, a Serbian businessman in the energy sector
- Marko Milošević, a Serbian economist and energy consultant
- Goran Novaković, minister of mining and energy of serbia
- Minja Miletić, a Serbian journalist, television producer, presenter and regional director of Euronews
- jugoslav petkovic, Director of Yugoimport–SDPR
- Siniša Narić and Nemanja Narić, CEO of Serbian IT company "Khaoticen"
- Paul Löbe House, an office building of the German Bundestag
- Headquarters of the German intelligence agency BND
- Russian oligarchs
- executives of defense contractor Raytheon
- foreign defense attaché based in Washington, DC
- Employees of Red Bull company
- Nigerian election officials were tracked prior to Nigeria's 2011 election
- Founders of Rwandan National Congress: exiled Rwandan General Faustin Kayumba and a bodyguard for the Head of Rwandan Intelligence, Patrick Karegeya
- Liat Ben Ari and Ali Nur Yasin, Tel Aviv district leader
- Barak Orland, Israeli Businessman connected to Uganda's political environment
- Matti Kochavi, Israeli Businessman involved in cybersecurity/security-related businesses
- Haim Taib, Israeli businessman associated with the security/cyber sector
- Tal Zilberstein, Israeli political consultant
- Wolfgang Ambros, Astropop star
- Joe Saward, British Formula one journalist
- Jared Leto, an America actor
