= List of honorary members of the Indonesian Marine Corps =

As of November 2025, 49 individuals have been bestowed the title of Honorary members of the Indonesian Marine Corps (Warga Kehormatan Kormar TNI-AL) by the Commandant of the Marine Corps. This honor grants them the privilege of wearing the Corps field uniform and the magenta beret adorned with the Corps Emblem.

No	Portrait	Honorary member	Date appointed by the Commandant	Title of office held when appointed
1		General of the Army (Ret); Abdul Harris Nasution	15 November 1965	Minister of Defense of the Republic of Indonesia and Commander of the Indonesian National Armed Forces (first defense minister and Commander of the Armed Forces to be appointed honorary member)
2		Admiral; Waloejo Soegito	15 November 1982	Chief of Staff of the Indonesian Navy
3		General; Leonardus Benjamin Moerdani	5 December 1986	Commander of the Indonesian National Armed Forces
4		General; Try Sutrisno	15 November 1990	Commander of the Indonesian National Armed Forces
5		Admiral; Muhamad Arifin	15 March 1993	Chief of Staff of the Indonesian Navy
6		Admiral; Tanto Kuswanto	15 November 1993	Chief of Staff of the Indonesian Navy
7		General; Feisal Tanjung	15 November 1994	Commander of the Indonesian National Armed Forces
8		Admiral; Arief Koeshariadi	15 November 1996	Chief of Staff of the Indonesian Navy
9		General; Charles C. Krulak, USMC	22 October 1997	Commandant of the United States Marine Corps (First foreign appointment)
10		Admiral; Widodo Adi Sutjipto	22 July 1999	Commander of the Indonesian National Armed Forces
11		Admiral; Achmad Sucipto	22 July 1999	Chief of Staff of the Indonesian Navy
12		Admiral; Indroko Sastrowiryono	21 March 2001	Chief of Staff of the Indonesian Navy
13		General; Endriartono Sutarto	18 January 2003	Commander of the Indonesian National Armed Forces
14		Admiral; Bernard Kent Sondakh	18 January 2003	Chief of Staff of the Indonesian Navy
15		Hassanal Bolkiah	10 April 2003	Sultan of Brunei Darussalam and Commander in Chief Royal Brunei Armed Forces
16		Admiral; Slamet Soebijanto	20 May 2005	Chief of Staff of the Indonesian Navy
17		Air Chief Marshal; Djoko Suyanto	13 August 2007	Commander of the Indonesian National Armed Forces
18		General; Djoko Santoso	2 February 2008	Commander of the Indonesian National Armed Forces
19		Admiral; Sumardjono	2 February 2008	Chief of Staff of the Indonesian Navy
20		Lieutenant General; Lee Sang-roh, ROKMC	7 May 2008	Commandant Republic of Korea Marine Corps
21		General (Ret); Susilo Bambang Yudhoyono	15 June 2008	President of Indonesia in his capacity as Commander-in-Chief of the Indonesian National Armed Forces (first President to be appointed Honorary Marine)
22		Admiral; Tedjo Edhy Purdijatno	8 August 2008	Chief of Staff of the Indonesian Navy
23		General; James T. Conway, USMC	7 August 2009	Commandant of the United States Marine Corps
24		Admiral; Agus Suhartono	15 November 2009	Commander of the Indonesian National Armed Forces
25		Admiral; Soeparno	2 November 2010	Chief of Staff of the Indonesian Navy
26		Purnomo Yusgiantoro	11 December 2010	Minister of Defense of the Republic of Indonesia
27		General; Timur Pradopo	29 December 2011	Chief of the Indonesian National Police
28		General; Pramono Edhie Wibowo	29 December 2011	Chief of Staff of the Indonesian Army
29		Air Chief Marshal; Imam Sufaat	29 December 2011	Chief of Staff of the Indonesian Air Force
30		Admiral; Marsetio	14 March 2013	Chief of Staff of the Indonesian Navy
31		General; Moeldoko	1 November 2013	Commander of the Indonesian National Armed Forces
32		General (Crown Prince); Al-Muhtadee Billah	5 May 2014	Crown Prince of Brunei Darussalam and Senior Minister in the Prime Minister's Office
33		Lieutenant General; Lee Young Ju, ROKMC	18 September 2014	Commandant Republic of Korea Marine Corps
34		General (Ret); Ryamizard Ryacudu	9 December 2014	Minister of Defense of the Republic of Indonesia
35		Admiral; Ade Supandi	2 April 2015	Chief of Staff of the Indonesian Navy
36		Joko Widodo	16 April 2015	President of Indonesia in his capacity as Commander-in-Chief of the Indonesian National Armed Forces (second President to be appointed Honorary Marine)
37		Air Chief Marshal; Hadi Tjahjanto	22 February 2018	Commander of the Indonesian National Armed Forces
38		Admiral; Siwi Sukma Adji	15 November 2018	Chief of Staff of the Indonesian Navy
39		Admiral; Yudo Margono	24 July 2020	Chief of Staff of the Indonesian Navy
40		General; Andika Perkasa	5 August 2022	Commander of the Indonesian National Armed Forces
41		General; Dudung Abdurachman	24 January 2023	Chief of Staff of the Indonesian Army
42		Puan Maharani	24 January 2023	Speaker of the House of Representatives of Indonesia
43		Police General; Listyo Sigit Prabowo	24 January 2023	Chief of the Indonesian National Police
44		Bambang Soesatyo	24 January 2023	Speaker of People's Consultative Assembly of Indonesia
45		Admiral; Muhammad Ali	24 January 2023	Chief of Staff of the Indonesian Navy
46		Air Chief Marshal; Fadjar Prasetyo	24 January 2023	Chief of Staff of the Indonesian Air Force
47		General (Ret.) (Hon.); Prabowo Subianto	24 January 2023	Minister of Defense of the Republic of Indonesia (until 2024), President of Indonesia in his capacity as Commander-in-Chief of the Indonesian National Armed Forces (since 2025) (retroactively 3rd President to be appointed Honorary Marine)
48		Mahfud MD	24 January 2023	Coordinating Minister for Political, Legal, and Security Affairs of the Republic of Indonesia
49		General; Agus Subiyanto	17 November 2026	Commander of the Indonesian National Armed Forces
