= Ahmad Dofiri =

Indonesian politician (born 1967)

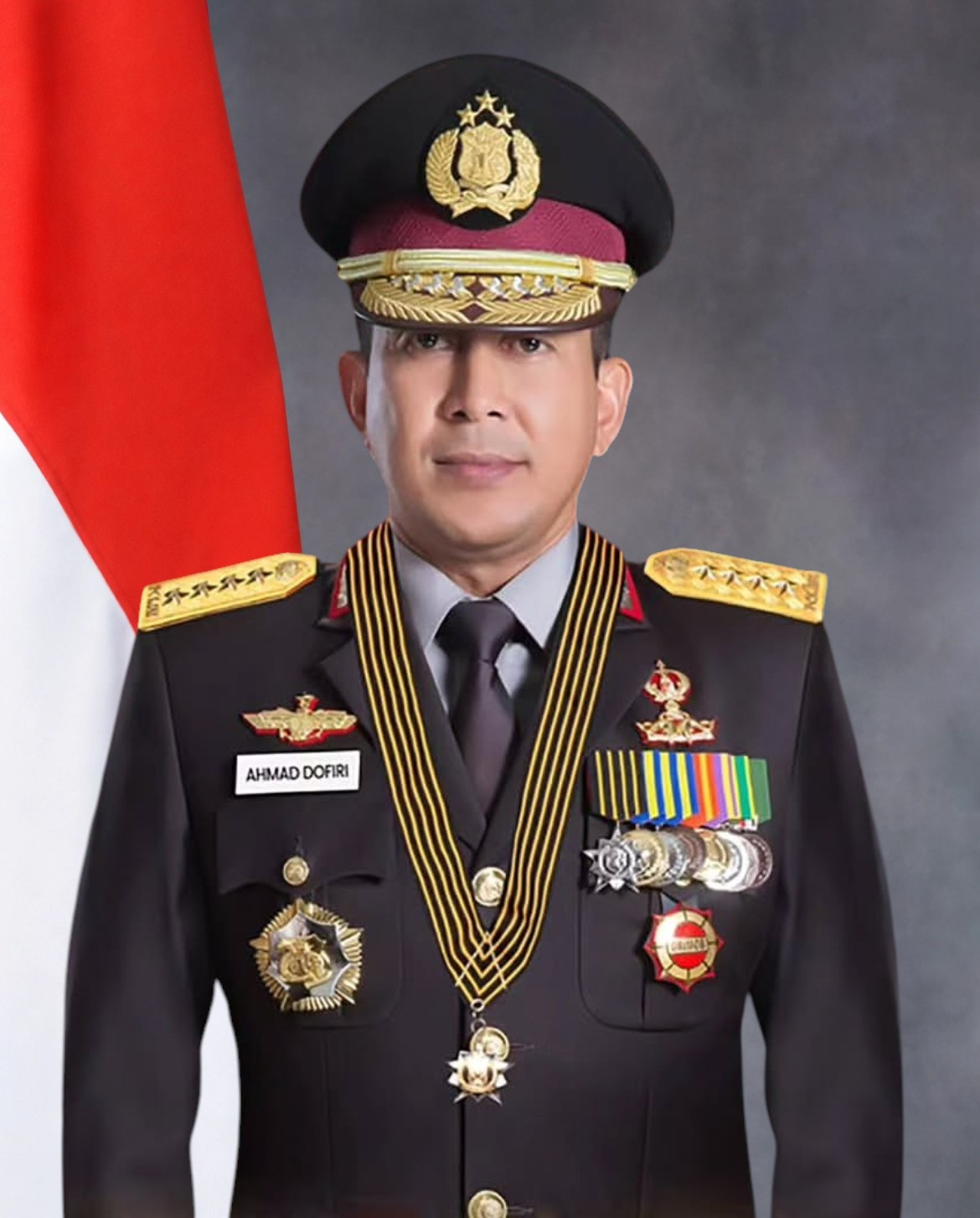
- Ahmad Dofiri in 2025

Special Advisor for Security, Public Order and Police Reform to the President
- Incumbent
- Assumed office 17 September 2025
- President: Prabowo Subianto

Deputy Chief of Indonesian National Police
- In office 11 November 2024 – 30 Juni 2025
- President: Prabowo Subianto
- Chief Police: Listyo Sigit Prabowo
- Preceded by: Agus Andrianto
- Succeeded by: Agus Prasetyo

Inspector of General Supervision of Indonesian National Police
- In office 26 February 2023 – 11 November 2024
- President: Joko Widodo; Prabowo Subianto
- Chief Police: Listyo Sigit Prabowo
- Preceded by: Agung Budi Maryoto
- Succeeded by: Dedi Prasetyo

Head of Security Intelligence Agency of Indonesian National Police
- In office 31 October 2021 – 26 February 2023
- Preceded by: Paulus Waterpauw
- Succeeded by: Wahyu Widada

Chief of West Java Regional Police
- In office 16 November 2020 – 31 October 2021
- Preceded by: Rudy Sufahriadi
- Succeeded by: Suntana

Assistant to the Chief of Indonesian National Police for Logistics
- In office 6 Desember 2019 – 16 November 2020
- Preceded by: Asep Suhendar
- Succeeded by: Firman Santyabudi

Chief of the Special Region of Yogyakarta Regional Police
- In office 14 November 2016 – 6 Desember 2019
- Preceded by: Prasta Wahyu Hidayat
- Succeeded by: Asep Suhendar

Personal details
- Born: 4 June 1967 (age 59)
- Party: Independent

Ahmad Dofiri (born 4 June 1967) is an Indonesian politician serving as special advisor for security, public order and police reform to president Prabowo Subianto since 2025. From 2024 to 2025, he served as deputy chief of the Indonesian National Police. From 2023 to 2024, he served as Inspectorate of General Supervision of the Indonesian National Police of the National Police. From 2021 to 2023, he served as chief of the Intelligence and Security Agency. From 2020 to 2021, he served as chief of the regional police of West Java. From 2016 to 2019, he served as chief of the regional police of Yogyakarta. In 2016, he served as chief of the regional police of Banten.
