= Indonesian Strategic Intelligence Agency =

Government agency of Indonesia

Indonesian National Armed Forces Strategic Intelligence Agency
- Badan Intelijen Strategis Tentara Nasional Indonesia
- Insignia of the Indonesian National Armed Forces
- Active: 1986
- Country: Indonesia
- Role: Military intelligence
- Size: 3,000
- Part of: Indonesian National Armed Forces (TNI)

Commanders
- Head: Lieutenant General Yudi Abrimantyo
- Vice Head: Major General Bosco Haryo Yunantok

The Indonesian National Armed Forces Strategic Intelligence Agency (Indonesian: Badan Intelijen Strategis Tentara Nasional Indonesia), abbreviated BAIS TNI, is a state institution that specifically handles military intelligence and is under the command of the Indonesian National Armed Forces headquarters. BAIS time-frames for actual and forecasted intelligence and strategy analysis for the future (short, medium, and long term) for the Armed Forces Commander and for the Ministry of Defence.

== History ==
=== PsiAD ===
BAIS started as the Army Psychological Center (Pusat Psikologi Angkatan Darat abbreviated PSiAD) belonging to the Army Headquarters (MBAD) to balance the Central Intelligence Bureau (Biro Pusat Intelijen abbreviated BPI) under the leadership of Subandrio, which absorbed a lot of PKI sympathists.

=== Pusintelstrat ===
At the beginning of the New Order era, the Ministry of Defense and Security established the Strategic Intelligence Center (Pusat Intelijen Strategis abbreviated as Pusintelstrat) with PSiAD members being mostly liquidated into it.

Pusintelstrat is led by the Chairman of the Directorate of Defense and Security Brigadier General L.B. Moerdani. The position continued to be held until L.B. Moerdani became Commander of the Indonesian Armed Forces. In this era, military intelligence had an operational intelligence agency but not part of Pusintelstrat called the Kopkamtib Intelligence Task Force. This agency in the Kopkamtib era played a full role as an Operational Intelligence Unit whose authority was very superior.

When Pusintelstrat was still the Indonesian national armed force intelligence agency, several operations that were known to have been carried out by Pusintelstrat:

- dealing and Surveillance with refugees from Vietnam who were accommodated on Galang Island.
- procuring Harpoon missiles on former Royal Dutch Navy warships.
- Negotiate with ASEAN countries to refused ASEAN to provide weapons assistance to the Khmer Rouge.

=== Badan Intelijen ABRI (BIA) ===
In 1980, the Pusintelstrat and the Kopkamtib Intelligence Task Force were merged into the ABRI Intelligence Agency (Badan Intelijen Angkatan Bersenjata Republik Indonesia abbreviated BIA). The BIA was commanded by the commander of ABRI, while operational duties of BIA are led by the Deputy Chief. "ABRI" was the name of the Armed Forces of Indonesia during the new order era.

several operations that were known to have been carried out by BIA:

- Operation Alpha, where BAIS negotiated with Israel and cooperated with MOSSAD to purchase 30 Douglas A-4 Skyhawk light combat aircraft from the Israeli Air Force.
- being involved in negotiations of Garuda Indonesian Airways Flight 206 plane hijacking.
- helped the escape of the DGSE agents who blew up the Rainbow Warrior ship.
- sent weapons and logistics to the Afghan mujahidin. The weapons sent consisted of several hundred AK-47 and several MILAN ATGM.

=== Badan Intelijen Strategis (BAIS) ===
In 1986, in response to the challenges, BIA was changed to BAIS. This change had an impact on organizational restructuring which must be able to cover and analyze all aspects of the Strategic Defense, Security and National Development.

After a long process, finally in 1999 (post reformation) the institution was legally recognized as Badan Intelijen Strategis Tentara Nasional Indonesia (shortened BAIS TNI).

== Organization ==
BAIS oversees Indonesian Defence attaches posted in various Indonesian diplomatic missions throughout the world.

=== Leadership of BAIS ===
The leadership of BAIS reports directly to the Commander of the Indonesian National Armed Forces (Panglima TNI). BAIS is led by a three-star general of the armed forces holding the title Kepala BAIS (Head of BAIS, abbreviated Ka BAIS), assisted by a two-star general serving as Wakil Kepala BAIS (Deputy Head of BAIS, abbreviated Waka BAIS). As of 2025, the agency is headed by Lieutenant General Yudi Abrimantyo, with Major General Bosco Haryo Yunanto serving as deputy head.

=== Directorates ===
BAIS operates under a secretive structure. According to Presidential Decree No. 66/2019, BAIS consists of eight directorates, each designated by a single letter. Prior to 2023, only seven directorates had publicly known functions, as identified in 2016. The eighth unit, Directorate H, established in 2019, remained undisclosed until its function was reportedly identified in 2023.

1. A Directorate for Domestic Military Intelligence
2. B Directorate for Foreign Military Intelligence
3. C Directorate for Defense and Military Intelligence
4. D Directorate for Military Security Intelligence
5. E Directorate for Psychological Operations
6. F Directorate for Administration and Finance
7. G Directorate for Research and Production
8. H Directorate for Strategic Defense Potentials Intelligence

=== Parental Units ===
BAIS oversees several parental units known as Satuan Induk Badan Intelijen Strategis (Satinduk BAIS TNI). It is commanded by a Brigadier General.

==== Scope Duties ====
===== Intelligence education =====
1. Basic training
2. Secondary training
3. Strategic training

===== Intelligence Functional Duties =====
1. Investigation
2. Security
  - Materials / Assets
  - Personnel
  - News / Information
3. Raising / Coaching

== Activities ==
- In 1997, BAIS successfully conducted a counterintelligence operation to arrest an Australian spy working for the ASIS and a person believed to be an Indonesian military intelligence officer who was planning a meeting to provide documents, document drop occurred in Jakarta but, unknown to both spies, they were being observed by Indonesian counter-intelligence officers, Within days the officer had been quietly shuttled out of the country, never to work in intelligence services again. A Herald investigation over several months has uncovered the agent's name, which, for legal reasons, cannot be published. He was operating under diplomatic cover and was not declared to the Indonesians as a spy, meanwhile According to one account, Indonesia Intelligence officer who was also arrested for working for ASIS was executed, which angered parts of the military.
- In 1998, José Ramos-Horta said that Indonesian intelligence was spying on East Timorese exiles around the world.
- Australian intelligence agencies have several times suspected that Indonesian intelligence agencies had succeeded in infiltrating the Australian government to recruit high-level Australian officials, such as in 1999 where the Australian intelligence agencies carried out a hunt for an Australian official in Canberra because they were suspected of being a spy for Indonesia's military intelligence agency is BAIS and it is believed that this official works near the top of a specified Canberra policy-making department, According to the information under investigation, the BAIS recruit is in a position to provide highly classified information as well as help shape Australian policy in ways that benefit the existing political and military power structure in Indonesia, and BAIS believed to share information about this with BIN, Until now the results of these investigations are unknown, and according to sources from Australian Broadcasting Corporation in 2013, the Australian official in Canberra who was spying for BAIS has still not been found and it seems that the investigation has ended.
- In 2013, in response to the Australia–Indonesia spying scandal, Tempo and ABC News (Australia) said that the Indonesian intelligence agency had known about this for a long time and exploited the scandal to gain as much advantage as possible from Australia, and Tempo also revealed that throughout 2000–2013. BIN, BAIS and also POLRI intelligence had successfully carried out many counter-intelligence operations to expose and disrupt multiple covert operations conducted by foreign intelligence and also arrested many foreign spies from Australia, western countries including America, several Asian countries such as China and also from Indonesian neighbors. These foreign intelligence operations included wiretapping, local recruitment, and bribing Indonesian officials to obtain secret information and to facilitate the interests of foreign countries. Instead of provoking an international scandal, BIN and BAIS often acted secretly. Foreign agents were declared persona non grata, secretly deported, and their countries were given strict but closed warnings to avoid diplomatic tensions, BIN and BAIS may also take advantage of this incident to find out the methods of foreign intelligence operations, blackmail foreign countries, strengthening Indonesia position in world geopolitics and even manipulate various events around the world.
- In 2013, it is known that INDONESIAN military intelligence (BAIS) agencies use Chinese surveillance equipment to target Australian officials, companies and individuals. BAIS is also known to have spied on thousands of Australians working in Indonesia and also western countries that have interests in Indonesia and it is known that this cooperation has been carried out since 2011. Intelligence cooperation between China and Indonesia has provided great benefits for China in understanding the political situation in the southeast Asian country and may answer why China was able to quickly have a strong influence in Southeast Asia and weaken the interests of Western countries in Southeast Asia.

=== Chinese intelligence linked activities ===
BAIS and BIN have changed world geopolitics in the 21st century through collaboration with Chinese intelligence agencies. BAIS and BIN collect intelligence from countries in South East Asia, Australia and other Western nations with interests in Indonesia. The intelligence data is later shared with Chinese Intelligence. Close intelligence cooperation between China and Indonesia has benefitted for China in understanding the political situation in Southeast Asia and for China to acquire intelligence about bilateral plans and strategies of Western nations, and this may answer why China was able to quickly have a strong influence in Southeast Asia and weaken the interests of Western countries in South East Asia.

BAIS may have also help China strengthen its influence throughout the world, with China obtaining information about the strategics of Western nations from BAIS and BIN, with which China then studies to weaken influence from the West, which ultimately impacts geopolitical changes and trigger destabilization throughout the world. Looking at the story about the collaboration between BAIS and the Chinese intelligence agency, BAIS may have been the initial party and liaison from the beginning of very close diplomatic relations between China and Indonesia, where it is said that President Xi Jinping knows Indonesia very well when he was regional party boss in Fujian where the families of many of Indonesia's Chinese tycoons came from.

== See also ==
- Indonesian State Intelligence Agency (BIN)
- Military intelligence
- Clandestine operation
- Government of Indonesia
- Indonesian National Armed Forces
