= 2026 Indonesia wiretapping incident =

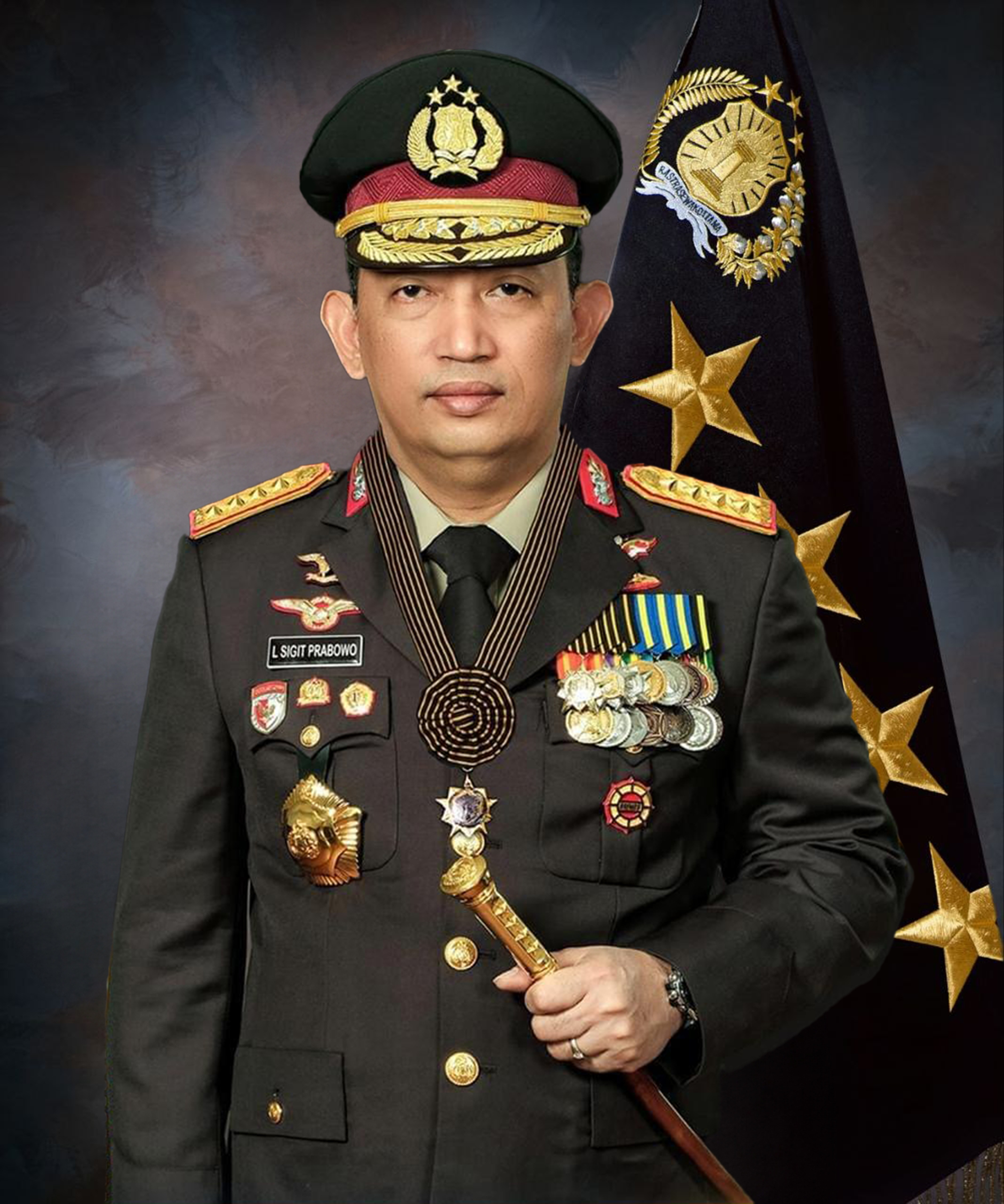
Listyo Sigit Prabowo, one of the people arrested

On 3 November 2026, the Indonesian National Police arrested former Indonesian police chief Listyo Sigit Prabowo, former presidential aide Ahrie Sonta Nasution, and former director in the criminal investigation agency Eko Hadi Santoso for wiretapping phones and other communications of the President of Indonesia Prabowo Subianto, along with numerous other politicians and prominent figures. The wiretapping was done using the police's Lawful Interception Management System (LIMS) from 2025 to 2026, followed by an instruction to destroy the data in the LIMS shortly before Listyo was ousted. As a result of the incident, Listyo was dismissed from his role as the presidential chief of staff, and the armed forces deployed more than 20,000 personnel to the capital, mostly from the marine forces.

== Timeline ==
According to the Head of the Criminal Investigation Agency, Police Commissioner General Asep Safrudin, the alleged wiretapping took place between 2025 and 2026, while Listyo Sigit was still serving as the Chief of the Indonesian National Police. The suspects allegedly ordered wiretaps without following the Indonesian National Police's established procedures for interception, as outlined in National Police Chief Regulation Number 5 of 2010. Several phone numbers were reportedly entered into the Lawful Interception Management System (LIMS) server without verification, and subsequently monitored, despite having no connection to any formal inquiry or criminal investigation.

Around October 2026, the suspects allegedly ordered the deletion of files containing the intercepted data from the LIMS computer system. In 2026, Listyo Sigit Prabowo was removed from his position as Chief of the Indonesian National Police and appointed as Chief of the Presidential Staff, while the role of National Police Chief was assumed by General Suyudi Ario Seto. Under this new leadership, an officer who became aware of the alleged misconduct filed a police report on 30 October 2026. This alleged illegal wiretapping was subsequently reported by Suyudi Ario Seto directly to President Prabowo Subianto.

During the investigation, the Criminal Investigation Agency (Bareskrim) examined 10 witnesses and three expert witnesses, and seized 11 mobile phones, one iPad, and four USB flash drives. On 3 November 2026, Bareskrim named Listyo Sigit Prabowo, Inspector General Ahrie Sonta Nasution, and Inspector General Eko Hadi Santoso as suspects. The three individuals were charged under Article 258 and Article 332, paragraphs 1 and 2, of the Criminal Code (KUHP) and/or Article 32, paragraph 1, of the ITE Law, and were subsequently taken into custody.

=== Military intervention ===
The Indonesian Navy deployed a total of 20,980 personnel to bolster security and anticipate developments in the Jakarta. This deployment follows a directive issued via telegram by the Commander of the Indonesian National Armed Forces, General Agus Subiyanto, and will be conducted under the operational control of the Jakarta Military Command (Kodam Jaya). The first phase begins on 2 November 2026, involving 2,100 personnel from units already stationed in Jakarta. The second and third phases, commencing on 4 November, will see the deployment of 5,740 personnel from outside Jakarta, while the fourth phase involves 13,140 personnel placed on full alert at their respective unit headquarters.

On the same day, the Palace reportedly initiated the process to remove Listyo Sigit from his position as Presidential Chief of Staff, with head of the presidential secretariat Ariyo Windutomo being appointed to fill in the vacancy provisionally. Prabowo instructed the National Police Chief to handle the case objectively and transparently; in response, the National Police Chief established a special team, led by the Head of the Criminal Investigation Agency, to conduct an in-depth investigation. Subsequently, on 5 November 2026, the special team named Inspector General Slamet Uliandi as a new suspect, though no arrest has been made yet.

== Reaction ==
Former Coordinating Minister for Political, Legal, and Security Affairs Mahfud MD described the scandal as the biggest crime in the history of Indonesian National Police and tied the incident as an act of treason. Mahfud also stated while Indonesian opinion regarding the current administration performance were mixed, espionage being done by the Head of National Police were deemed as disgraceful act. Mahfud also demanded new Head of National Police, Suyudi Ario Seto to cleanse the institution from Listyo and allegedly Solo Gang influences.

Former President Susilo Bambang Yudhoyono expressed his concern on developing situation via social media post. Yudhoyono described the current political development as a "wild political development" and regretted the power struggle has caused illegal act to be executed. Yudhoyono also urged President Prabowo to restore civility and order as such duty was entrusted to the President by the people.

Former Head of Criminal Investigation Agency, Susno Duadji also gave his statement on televised interview that there could be an external forces outside the police force who aided the espionage. Later, Susno also gave his confidence to Suyudi to resolve the matter and he expected more arrests will be made at one point.
