= Anto Mukti Putranto =

Indonesian politician (born 1964)

Lieutenant General (Ret.) Anto Mukti Putranto
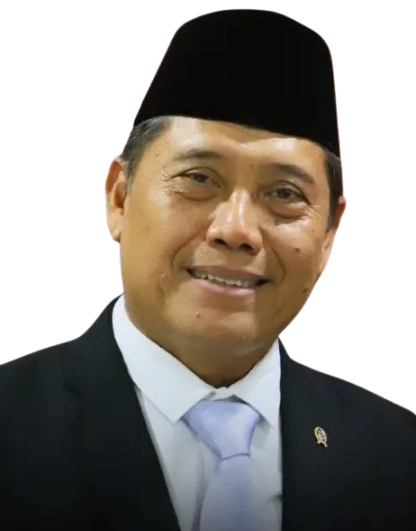
- Putranto, 2024

Chief of Staff for the President
- In office 20 October 2024 – 17 September 2025
- President: Prabowo Subianto
- Deputy: Muhammad Qodari
- Preceded by: Moeldoko
- Succeeded by: Muhammad Qodari

Personal details
- Born: 26 February 1964 (age 62) Jember, East Java
- Party: Independent
- Spouse: Aria Prasetya Wardhani
- Children: 2

Anto Mukti Putranto (born 26 February 1964) is an Indonesian politician and retired military officer served as chief of staff for the president. He served as commander of the 1st Infantry Division from 2016 to 2017, as commander of Kodam II/Sriwijaya from 2017 to 2018, and as commander of the Indonesian Army Doctrine, Education and Training Development Command from 2018 to 2022.

== Honours ==
As the officer at Indonesian Army, he has received several orders, decorations and awards, namely:

=== National Honours ===
- Star of Dharma – 2019
- Star of Yudha Dharma, 2nd Class
- Star of Kartika Eka Paksi, 2nd Class
- Star of Bhayangkara, 2nd Class – 2021
- Star of Yudha Dharma, 3rd Class
- Star of Kartika Eka Paksi, 3rd Class
- Active Duty in the Army Medal
- Military Long Service Medal, 24 Years
- Military Long Service Medal, 16 Years
- Military Long Service Medal, 8 Years
- Military Operation Service Medal IX Raksaka Dharma
- Military Instructor Service Medal
- Medal for Active International Military Duty

=== Foreign honours ===
Ribbon	Distinction	Country	Date	Reference
	UN Peacekeeping Distinction Medal	United Nations	Unknown	
	Military Valour Medal, Silver	Lebanon	Unknown	
