= Ministry of Immigration and Correction =

Government ministry of Indonesia

- Kementerian Imigrasi dan Pemasyarakatan
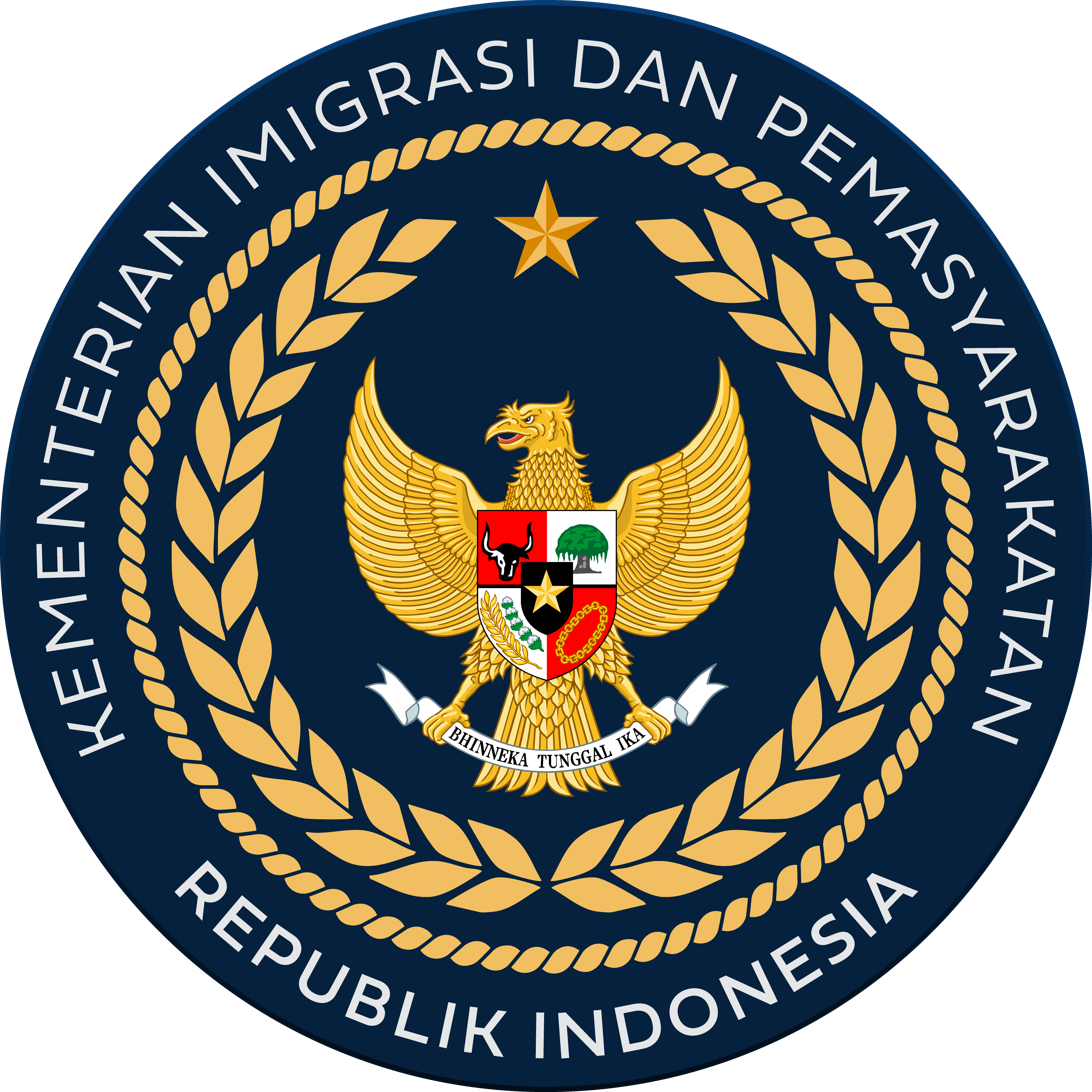

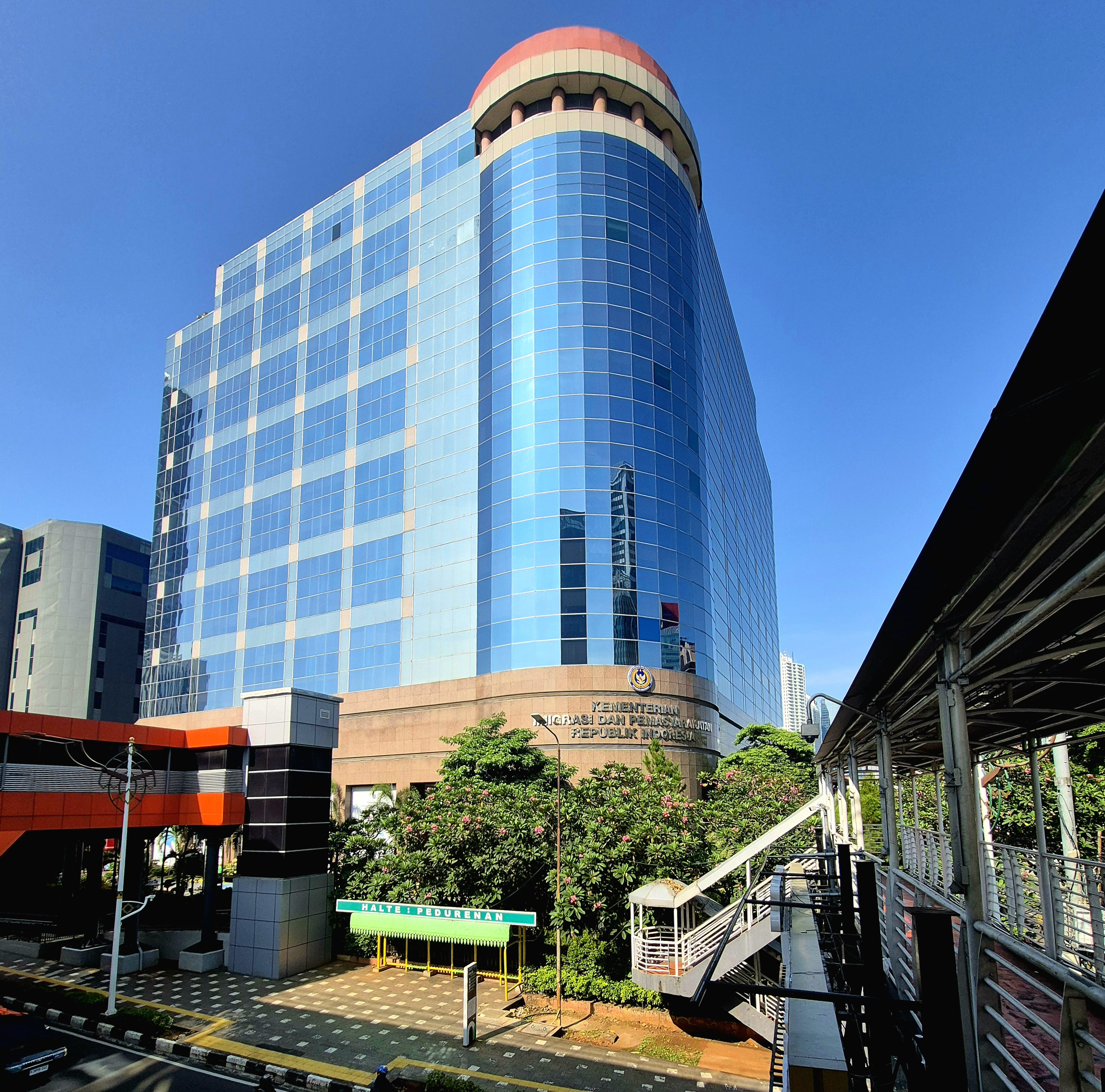

Ministry overview
- Formed: 21 October 2024
- Preceding agencies: Directorate General III (Immigration), Ministry of Law and Human Rights; Directorate General IV (Correction), Ministry of Law and Human Rights
- Jurisdiction: Government of Indonesia
- Headquarters: Jalan H.R. Rasuna Said Kav. 6-7 Jakarta Selatan 12940 Jakarta, Indonesia
- Ministers responsible: Agus Andrianto, Minister for Immigration and Correction; Silmy Karim, Deputy Minister for Immigration and Correction
- Parent department: Coordinating Ministry for Legal, Human Rights, Immigration, and Correction
- Website: www.kemenimipas.go.id

The Ministry of Immigration and Correction is an Indonesian ministry that administers and develops immigration and correction in Indonesia. The ministry has been led by Agus Andrianto since 21 October 2024.

== Organization ==
Based on Presidential Decree No. 157/2024 as expanded by the Ministry of Immigration and Correction Decree No. 1/2024, 2/2024, and 4/2024, the Ministry of Immigration and Correction is organized into the following:

- Office of the Minister for Immigration and Correction
- Office of the Deputy Minister for Immigration and Correction
- General Secretariat
  - Bureau of Planning and Finance
  - Bureau of Apparatuses, Human Resources, Organization, and Administration
  - Bureau of State Properties
  - Bureau of Law and Partnerships
  - Bureau of General Affairs
- Directorate General for Immigration (Directorate General I)
  - Directorate General for Immigration Secretariat
  - Directorate of Visas and Travel Documents
  - Directorate of Residence Permits and Immigration Status
  - Directorate of Immigration Intelligence
  - Directorate of Immigration Supervision and Enforcement
  - Directorate of Immigration Partnership and Representative Fostering
  - Directorate of Internal Compliance
  - Directorate of Immigration Information and Technology
  - 33 Provincial Regional Offices of Directorate General for Immigration
    - City/Regency-level Immigration Office(s)/Servicing Units
      - Immigration Detention Room
  - 13 Immigration Detention Centers
    - 1 Central Immigration Detention Center (Tanjung Pinang)
      - 12 Regional Immigration Detention Centers (Medan, Pekanbaru, Jakarta, Semarang, Surabaya, Denpasar, Pontianak, Balikpapan, Kupang, Makassar, Manado, Jayapura)
- Directorate General for Correction (Directorate General II)
  - Directorate General for Correction Secretariat
  - Directorate of Correctional System and Strategies
  - Directorate of Prisoner and Juvenile Services
  - Directorate of Prisoner and Juvenile Fostering
  - Directorate of Correctional Fostering
  - Directorate of Health and Rehabilitation
  - Directorate of Security and Intelligence
  - Directorate of Internal Compliance
  - Directorate of Correction Information and Technology
  - 33 Provincial Regional Offices of Directorate General for Correction
    - Detention Centers
      - State Detention Centers (for adult delinquents)
      - State Detention Wings (for delinquents involved in narcotics)
      - Juvenile Temporary Detention Centers (for juvenile delinquents)
      - Juvenile Halls
      - Sub-unit of Detention Centers
    - Correctional Institutions
      - General Correctional Institutions
      - Juvenile Correctional Institutions
      - Narcotics Correctional Institutions
      - Open Correctional Institutions
      - Female Correctional Institutions
    - Parole and Probation Offices
    - Correctional Facility of State Confiscated Goods and Forfeited Assets (responsibility of these facilities transferred to the Attorney General's Office since July 2025)
- General Inspectorate
  - General Inspectorate Secretariat
  - Inspectorate I
  - Inspectorate II
  - Inspectorate III
  - Inspectorate IV
- Agency for Immigration and Correction Human Resource Development
  - Agency Secretariat
  - Center for Values and Competency Development
  - Center for Education and Training
- Board of Experts
  - Senior Expert to the Minister on Interinstitutional Relationship
  - Senior Expert to the Minister on Public Services and Legal Reform
  - Senior Expert to the Minister on Bureaucracy Reform Strengthening
- Centers
  - Center for Strategic Policies
  - Center for Data, Information, and Public Communication
  - Pengayoman Hospital
