= Teten Masduki =

Indonesian social activist

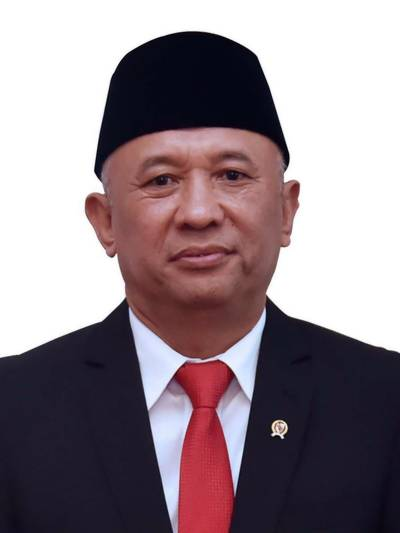
- Official portrait, 2019

11th Minister of Cooperatives and Small & Medium Enterprises
- In office 23 October 2019 – 20 October 2024
- President: Joko Widodo
- Preceded by: Anak Agung Gede Ngurah Puspayoga
- Succeeded by: TBA

2nd Presidential Chief of Staff
- In office 2 September 2015 – 17 January 2018
- President: Joko Widodo
- Preceded by: Luhut Binsar Pandjaitan
- Succeeded by: Moeldoko

Personal details
- Born: 6 May 1963 (age 62) Garut, Indonesia
- Party: PDI-P (since 2023)
- Occupation: Politician
- Known for: Ramon Magsaysay Award in 2005

Teten Masduki (born 6 May 1963) is an Indonesian politician. He served as Minister for Cooperatives and Small and Medium Enterprises in the Onward Indonesia Cabinet from 2019 to 2024. Prior to that, he served as Chief of Presidential Staff from 2015 to 2018 replacing Luhut Binsar Pandjaitan.

He is also a social activist involved in public clearinghouse for information about corruption, collusion, and nepotism of Indonesia. He was awarded Ramon Magsaysay Award in 2005.
