= Ahrie Sonta Nasution =

Head of the Legal Division of the Indonesian National Police
- Incumbent
- Assumed office 3 October 2026
- Preceded by: Agus Nugroho

Personal details
- Born: 2 April 1981 (age 45) Bandung, West Java, Indonesia
- Spouse: R. Fitria Rachmawati Permana
- Children: 3
- Police career
- Branch: Indonesian National Police
- Service years: 2002–
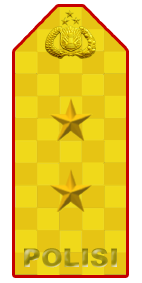
- Rank: Inspector General

Ahrie Sonta Nasution (born 2 April 1981) is an Indonesian police officer who is currently serving as the chief of the legal division of the Indonesian National Police, in office since 3 October 2026. Previously, Ahrie was the personal secretary to national police chief Listyo Sigit Prabowo and aide-de-camp to president Prabowo Subianto from the police corps, before a brief stint in the police's internal affairs division as a principal second-class internal investigator. During his stint as Listyo's confidant, Ahrie was known for responding and monitoring police related reports on Twitter. He is the first brigadier general and inspector general of his class and, at the time of his two-star appointment, was the youngest inspector general in the police forces.

== Early life and education ==
Ahrie was born on 2 April 1981 in Bandung. He graduated from the Indonesian Police Academy as its 2002 cohort and was commissioned as a second police inspector. He received his bachelor's degree in law from the Palembang University in 2003, and another in policing sciences from the School of Police Sciences in 2009, with a final assignment on the Jakarta metropolitan police's traffic management center. He received his master's degree in law from the Diponegoro University, and in 2018 received his doctorate in police sciences from the Police Sciences College with his dissertation on policing culture reform.

== Career ==
Ahrie was briefly assigned at the West Java provincial police before moving to South Sumatra. During his time in the province, he served in a number of positions, including as chief of vehicle identification in the Palembang police and chief of traffic in the Musi Banyuasin Regency police between 2005 and 2006. In his latter role, Ahrie intercepted a towing truck carrying the official car of the Aceh's governor at the Palembang-Jambi interprovincial road. He was promoted to the rank of first police inspector in 2006, and in 2007 attended training at the Netherlands Police Academy and on crime scene analysis by visual comparison in Münster in 2007.

After graduating from the School of Police Sciences, Ahrie was posted as chief of traffic at the Sidoarjo police. During his stint, Ahrie handled a number of major vehicle accidents in the region, including the arrest of a bus driver who fled after crashing into a dump truck. After Sidoarjo police chief M. Iqbal established a preventive management center, Ahrie was put in charge of the center's daily operations. In mid-April 2012, Ahrie moved from the Sidoarjo police to the East Java provincial police, where he was stationed as an administrative officer at the vehicle registration office in Manyar, East Surabaya.Ahrie was promoted to police commissioner in 2014, and in 2015 attended a course on human resources for mid-level police officers as well as another overseas training at the Joint Special Operations University, which lasted until 2016. He completed mid-level police education in 2016, and in 2017 briefly attended S. Rajaratnam School of International Studies for a non-degree program.

On 19 October 2018, after a provisional assignment at the police's education and training center, Ahrie was appointed as a unit chief within the Jakarta metropolitan police's drug investigation directorate. During his months-long tenure, Ahrie managed to uncover both local and global drug distribution networks operating from Jakarta. He continued his assignment in the directorate as a mid-level investigator, during which he was deployed to Papua as part of the Nemangkawi Special Operations to subdue separatist movements in the region. In 2019, Ahrie was appointed as the head of monitoring team in the development and operations bureau of the national police's criminal investigation agency. Ahrie was present during the arrest of Djoko Tjandra, a Chinese-Indonesian banker who was convicted of embezzling banking funds, in July 2020. He was promoted to police adjunct chief commissioner on that year.

On 3 August 2020, Ahrie was appointed as the chief of the Tanjung Priok dock police, and took office on 18 August 2020. Amidst the-then ongoing COVID-19 pandemic, Ahrie launched the #PriokBermasker (#MaskedPriok) program to prevent further spread of the virus by encouraging local populace to wear masks and regular testing and tracking, as well as the Kampung Tangguh Jaya (Resilient and Victorious village) program to strengthen the capacity of localities in Tanjung Priok. After Sriwijaya Air Flight 182 crashed into the sea near Tanjung Priok, Ahrie took part in the search and rescue team to evacuate the plane crash. Ahrie also established an emergency post at one of the Jakarta International Container Terminal bay for relatives of the victims. Ahrie arrested of a number of drug suppliers operating within his jurisdiction, as well as artists who were caught red-handed using drugs.

Ahrie gained media attention for becoming the only mid-level police officer to accompany the-then nominee for the national police chief Listyo Sigit Prabowo during his parliamentary assessment on 20 January 2021. Ahrie, along with other seven generals invited by Listyo to take part in his assesment, was introduced as a demonstration of intergenerational solidarity within the police forces. After Listyo became the national police chief, on 18 February Ahrie was appointed as Listyo's personal secretary. He received an extraordinary promotion to the rank of police grand commissioner in August of that year, becoming the first in his class to achieve the rank. During his stint as Listyo's confidant, Ahrie personally responded to police-related issues or incident reports on Twitter, and monitored the resolution of these cases. Ahrie's social media activity earned him the praise of legislative member Hinca Pandjaitan, who exemplified him as an "active and responsive" police figure and challenged the police's education chief to produce "a thousand Ahries".

On 23 October 2024, Listyo announced Ahrie's confirmation as the aide-de-camp from the police forces to President Prabowo Subianto. He was chosen over six other candidates through an assessment process. After a year in service, he was reassigned to the police force's internal division as a principal second-class internal investigator. He was promoted to promoted to brigadier generalon 6 October 2025, and to inspector general on 25 September 2026, becoming the first in his class for both ranks. Listyo was replaced by Suyudi Ario Seto as the new national police chief on 1 October 2026, and a day after his replacement Suyudi issued a decree which appointed Ahrie to the two-star position of the chief of the legal division of the national police. Ahrie took office on 3 October 2026.

On 3 November 2026, the national police force announced the arrest of Ahrie, Listyo, and two other high-ranking police officers after being convicted of illegally wiretapping Prabowo's communications, as well as politicians and other prominent figures during the last two years of Listyo's police chief tenure from 2025 to 2026. The suspects entered the phone numbers of the figure to the Indonesian police's Lawful Interception Management System without verification and attempted to delete proofs of evidence of interception around the time of Listyo's dismissal. Although it was initially stated by coordinating minister for legal affairs Yusril Ihza Mahendra that there were no charges of treason, minister of state secretary Prasetyo Hadi raised the possibility of the perpetrators being charged of treason and threatening state security, a sentiment later agreed by Yusril who stated that there is a "temporary conclusion that there were indications of treason being done".

== Personal life ==
Ahrie is married to R. Fitria Rachmawati Permana and has three children.
