= Pramono Edhie Wibowo =

Indonesian Army general (1955–2020)

General (Ret.) Pramono Edhie Wibowo
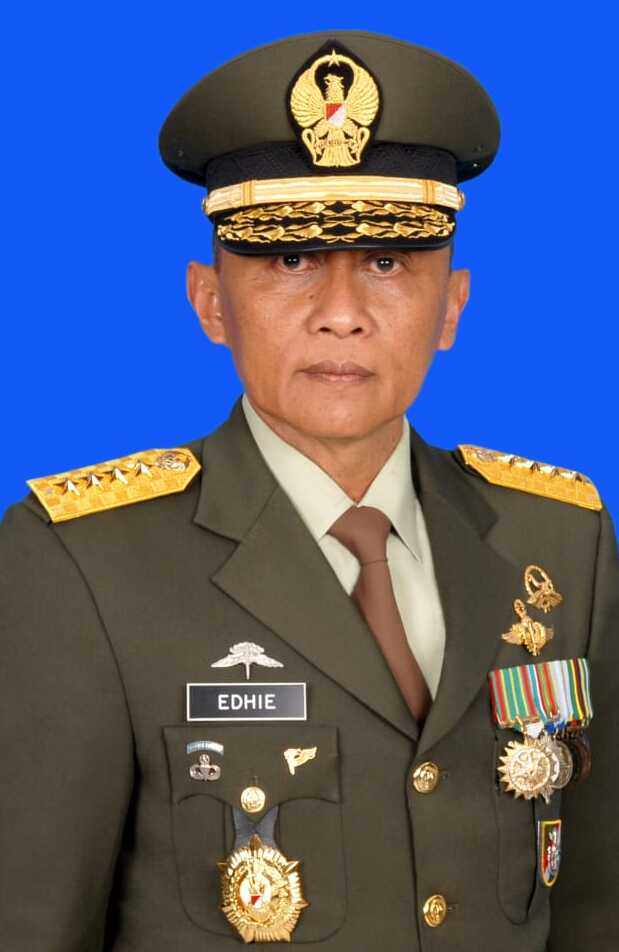
- Official portrait, 2011

27th Chief of Staff of the Indonesian Army
- In office 30 June 2011 – 20 May 2013
- President: Susilo Bambang Yudhoyono
- Preceded by: General George Toisutta
- Succeeded by: General Moeldoko

32nd Commander of Kostrad
- In office 30 September 2010 – 9 August 2011
- President: Susilo Bambang Yudhoyono
- Preceded by: Lt. Gen. Burhanuddin Amin
- Succeeded by: Lt. Gen. Azmyn Yusri Nasution

29th Commander of Kodam III/Siliwangi
- In office October 2009 – 30 September 2010
- President: Susilo Bambang Yudhoyono
- Preceded by: Maj. Gen. Rasyid Qurnuen Aquary
- Succeeded by: Maj. Gen. Moeldoko

23rd Commandant General of Kopassus
- In office 1 July 2008 – 4 December 2009
- President: Susilo Bambang Yudhoyono
- Preceded by: Maj. Gen. Soenarko
- Succeeded by: Maj. Gen. Lodewijk Freidrich Paulus

Personal details
- Born: 5 May 1955 Magelang, Indonesia
- Died: 13 June 2020 (aged 65) Cianjur, Indonesia
- Resting place: Kalibata Heroes' Cemetery
- Party: Demokrat
- Spouse: Kiki Gayatri Soepono
- Relations: Kristiani Herrawati (sister); Susilo Bambang Yudhoyono (brother-in-law); Hadi Utomo (brother-in-law)
- Parents: Sarwo Edhie Wibowo (father); Sunarti Sri Hadiyah (mother)
- Education: Indonesian Military Academy; Indonesian Army Command and General Staff College
- Occupation: Army officer; politician
- Website: pramonoedhiewibowo.com

Military service
- Allegiance: Indonesia
- Branch/service: Indonesian Army
- Years of service: 1980–2013
- Rank: General
- Unit: Infantry (Kopassus)
- Commands: Kopassus; Kodam III/Siliwangi; Kostrad; Indonesian Army
- Battles/wars: Operation Lotus; Insurgency in Aceh
- Service no.: 29029

General (Ret.) Pramono Edhie Wibowo (5 May 1955 – 13 June 2020) was an Indonesian military officer who served as the Chief of Staff of the Army from 31 June 2011 until 20 May 2013. He was the brother-in-law of former Indonesian president Susilo Bambang Yudhoyono. Before becoming Indonesian Army Chief of Staff, he was Commander of Army Strategic Command (Kostrad) (Pangkostrad), Commandant General of Kopassus (Danjen Kopassus), Commander of the Military Territory III/Siliwangi, Chief of Staff of the Military Territory IV/Diponegoro, as well as Personal Aide of former Indonesian President, Megawati Sukarnoputri. He died at Cimacan Hospital, Cianjur Regency on 13 June 2020 due to a heart attack.

Military offices
Preceded by George Toisutta	Chief of Staff of the Indonesian Army; 2011–2013	Succeeded by Moeldoko
Preceded by Burhanuddin Amin	Commander of Kostrad; 2010–2011	Succeeded by Azmyn Yusri Nasution
Preceded by Rasyid Qurnuen Aquary	Commander of Kodam III/Siliwangi; 2009–2010	Succeeded by Moeldoko
Preceded by Soenarko	General Commander of Kopassus; 2008–2009	Succeeded by Lodewijk Freidrich Paulus
