= Executive Office of the President of the Republic of Indonesia =

Agency of the Indonesian government

- Kantor Staf Presiden Republik Indonesia
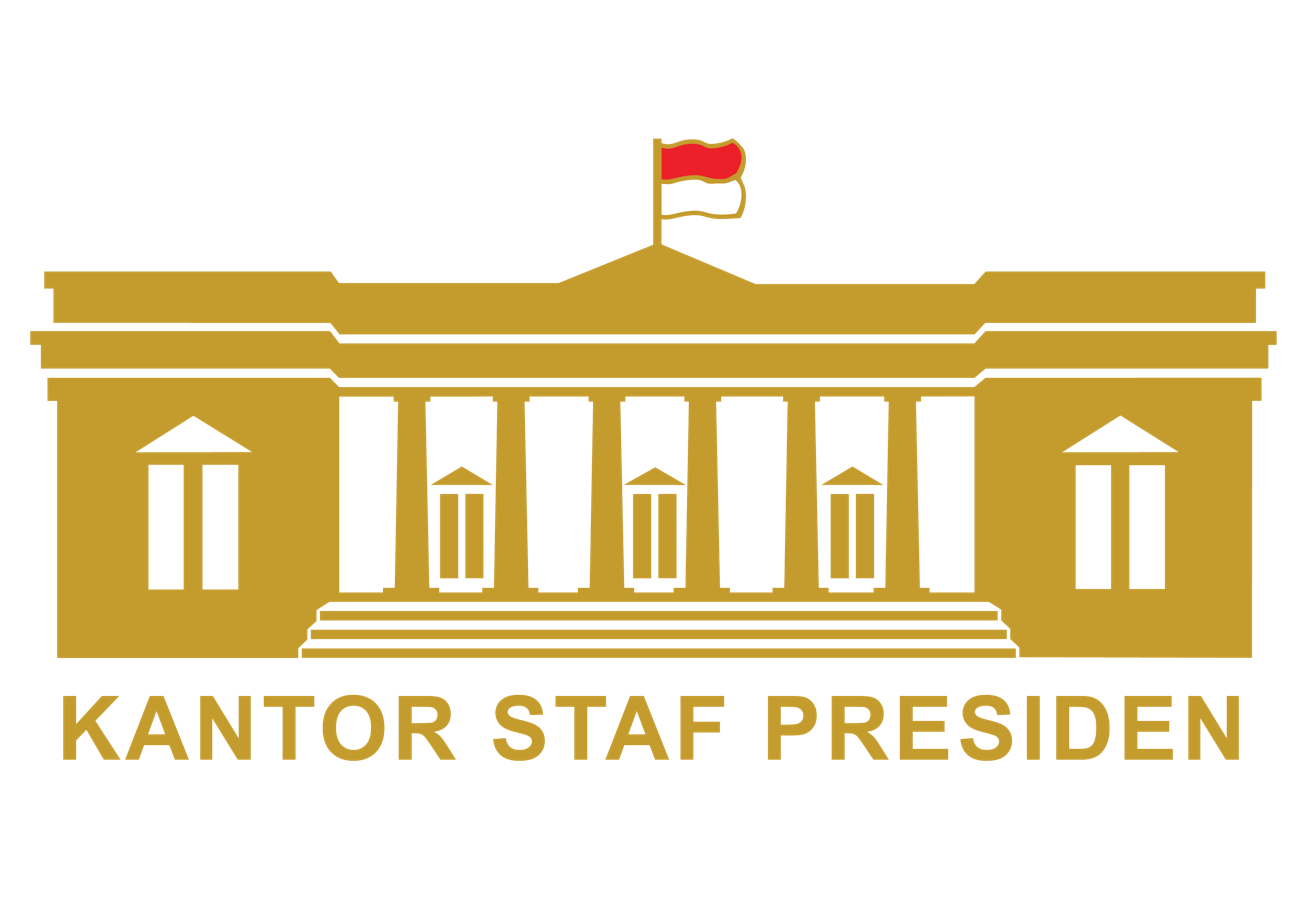

Agency overview
- Formed: 23 February 2015; 11 years ago
- Preceding Agency: Unit of Presidential Staff (Unit Staf Kepresidenan)
- Jurisdiction: Government of Indonesia
- Headquarters: Gedung Bina Graha, Jalan Veteran No. 16, Central Jakarta, Jakarta, Indonesia
- Agency executives: Ariyo Windutomo, (Acting) Chief of Presidential Staff; Vacant, Deputy Chief of Presidential Staff
- Website: ksp.go.id

The Executive Office of the President of the Republic of Indonesia (Indonesian: Kantor Staf Presiden Republik Indonesia, lit. 'Office of Staffs of the President of the Republic of Indonesia') is a non-structural government agency directly under the auspices of the President of Indonesia. The office reports to the President and is headed by a Chief of Staff. Previously, the office was named Unit of Presidential Staff (Unit Staf Kepresidenan) based on the Presidential Decree No.29/ 2014. The current name has been used based on the Presidential Decree No.26/2015 dated 23 February 2015 due to the expansion of the task and function assigned to the office.

== Tasks and functions ==
The Republic of Indonesia's Presidential Executive Office has the primary task to support and assist the President and Vice President of Indonesia in controlling, managing, and ensuring the realization of national priority programs as well as political and strategic affairs management. In order to perform such tasks, the President's executive office are assigned the following functions:

1. To manage national priority programs, to ensure the programs are aligned with the President's vision and mission;
2. To provide support in acceleration of national priority programs and strategic issues;
3. To monitor and evaluate the execution of national priority programs and strategic issues;
4. To handle comprehensive dispute resolutions on any national priority programs which encounter any obstacle/problem/dispute;
5. To manage strategic issues;
6. To manage communication strategy of the President and Vice President;
7. To manage political communication strategy and disseminate information;
8. To provide data and information analysis for strategic decision making;
9. To execute administrative duty of the Executive Office of the President;
10. To execute other functions as assigned by the President.

== Organization structure ==
Based on Presidential Decree No. 17/2026, the Executive Office of the President consists of:

=== Executives ===
1. Chief of Staff for the President (Kepala Staf Kepresidenan), who heads the executive office and directly responsible to the president; and
2. Vice Chief of Staff for the President (Wakil Kepala Staf Kepresidenan), who assists the Chief of Staff in executing the duties of the executive office.

=== Deputies ===
1. Deputy Chief of Staff for Politics, Security, Legal, Human Rights, Immigration, and Correction (Deputi I Bidang Politik, Keamanan, Hukum, Hak Asasi Manusia, Imigrasi, dan Pemasyarakatan);
2. Deputy Chief of Staff for Economics and Food Affairs (Deputi II Bidang Ekonomi dan Pangan);
3. Deputy Chief of Staff for Human Development, Culture, Social Empowerment (Deputi III Bidang Pembangunan Manusia, Kebudayaan, dan Pemberdayaan Masyarakat);
4. Deputy Chief of Staff for Infrastructure and Regional Development (Deputi IV Bidang Infrasruktur dan Pembangunan Kewilayahan)

=== Advisors ===
1. Special Advisor for Infrastructure, Energy, and Investment (Staf Khusus Bidang Infrastruktur, Energi, dan Investasi);
2. Special Advisor for Human Development (Staf Khusus Bidang Pembangunan Manusia);
3. Special Advisor for Economic Affairs (Staf Khusus Bidang Perekonomian);
4. Special Advisor for Information and Political Communication (Staf Khusus Bidang Informasi dan Komunikasi Politik);
5. Special Advisor for Politics, Law, Defense, Security and Human Rights (Staf Khusus Bidang Politik, Hukum, Pertahanan, Keamanan, dan Hak Asasi Manusia).

=== Staffs / advisors ===
The Professional Staffs / Advisors (Tenaga Profesional) work directly under the coordination of the deputies. The Staffs / Advisors consist of:

- Senior Advisors, Equivalent To Echelon I.b (Tenaga Ahli Utama, Disetarakan Eselon I.b)
- Advisors, Equivalent To Echelon II.a (Tenaga Ahli Madya, Disetarakan Eselon II.a)
- Assistant Advisors, Equivalent To Echelon III.a (Tenaga Ahli Muda, Disetarakan Eselon III.a)
- Junior Advisors, Equivalent To Echelon III.b (Tenaga Terampil, Disetarakan Eselon III.b)

=== Secretariat ===
The Secretariat of The Executive Office of The President (Sekretariat Kantor Staf Presiden) is headed by The Head of Secretariat who is a career civil servant. Even though the secretariat works under the Chief of Staff to the President to run the administrative aspect of the Office, the secretariat consists of civil servants coordinated and administered by the Ministry of State Secretariat.

== List of the Presidential Chief of Staff ==
No	Name	Image	Took office	Left office	President
1	Luhut Binsar Pandjaitan		31 December 2014	2 September 2015	Joko Widodo
2	Teten Masduki		2 September 2015	18 January 2018	Joko Widodo
3	Moeldoko		18 January 2018	20 October 2024	Joko Widodo
4	Anto Mukti Putranto		21 October 2024	17 September 2025	Prabowo Subianto
5	Muhammad Qodari		17 September 2025	27 April 2026	Prabowo Subianto
6	Dudung Abdurachman		27 April 2026	1 Oktober 2026	Prabowo Subianto
7	Listyo Sigit Prabowo		1 October 2026	4 November 2026	Prabowo Subianto
-	Ariyo Windutomo		4 November 2026	Incumbent	Prabowo Subianto
