= Dudung Abdurachman =

Indonesian general (born 1965)

General (Ret.) Dudung Abdurachman
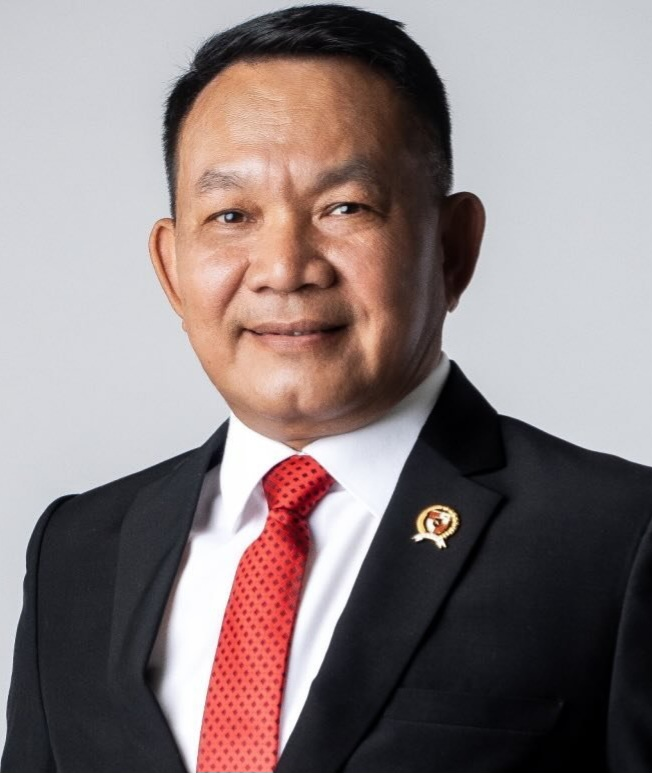
- Abdurrachman, 2025

19th Coordinating Minister for Political and Security Affairs
- Incumbent
- Assumed office 1 October 2026
- President: Prabowo Subianto
- Preceded by: Djamari Chaniago

Presidential Chief of Staff
- In office 27 April 2026 – 1 October 2026
- President: Prabowo Subianto
- Preceded by: Muhammad Qodari
- Succeeded by: Listyo Sigit Prabowo

Special Advisor to the President for National Defense Affairs
- In office 21 October 2024 – 27 April 2026
- President: Prabowo Subianto
- Preceded by: Widodo Adi Sutjipto (Note: as Member of the Presidential Advisory Council for Security and Defense Affairs)

33rd Chief of Staff of the Indonesian Army
- In office 17 November 2021 – 25 October 2023
- Preceded by: Andika Perkasa
- Succeeded by: Agus Subiyanto

42nd Commander of Army Strategic Reserve Command
- In office 25 May 2021 – 31 January 2022
- Preceded by: Eko Margiyono
- Succeeded by: Maruli Simanjuntak

34th Commander of Kodam Jaya
- In office 27 July 2020 – 25 May 2021
- Succeeded by: Mulyo Aji

Personal details
- Born: 19 November 1965 (age 60) Bandung, West Java, Indonesia
- Party: Independent
- Education: Indonesian Military Academy

Military service
- Allegiance: Indonesia
- Branch/service: Indonesian Army
- Years of service: 1988–2023
- Rank: General
- Unit: Infantry
- Battles/wars: Operation Seroja Insurgency in Aceh

General (Ret.) Dudung Abdurachman (born 19 November 1965) is an Indonesian army general who has served as the 19th Coordinating Minister for Political and Security Affairs since 1 October 2026, replacing Djamari Chaniago. He previously served as Presidential Chief of Staff from April to October 2026, and as the 33rd Chief of Staff of the Indonesian Army (Kasad) from 2021 to 2023. He graduated from the Indonesian Military Academy (Akmil) in 1988 beginning his career in the infantry. He was appointed Commander of Kodam Jaya on 27 July 2020, then on 25 May 2021, appointed Commander of the Kostrad.

Dudung gained media attention in late 2020 for his anti-radicalism statements and standoff against extremist groups such as the Islamic Defenders Front (FPI). Furthermore, as Commander of Kodam Jaya, he instructed soldiers under his command to take down provocative banners and posters related to the Islamic Defenders Front (FPI) throughout Jakarta, due to the inability of the civilian authorities. This action then sparked controversy.

== Honours ==
Abdurachman was appointed an Honorary Officer of the Order of Australia on 9 October 2023 for distinguished service as the Chief of Staff of the Indonesian Army in enhancing the relationship and interoperability between the Australian Army and the Indonesian Army.

=== National ===
- Indonesia:
  - Star of Mahaputera, 3rd Class (Bintang Mahaputera Utama) - 2024
  - Star of Meritorious Service (Bintang Dharma)
  - Star of Army Meritorious Service, 1st Class (Bintang Kartika Eka Paksi) - 2022
  - Star of Navy Meritorious Service, 1st Class (Bintang Jalasena Utama) - 2023
  - Star of Air Force Meritorious Service, 1st Class (Bintang Swa Bhuwana Paksa) - 2023
  - Star of National Police Meritorious Service, 1st Class (Bintang Bhayangkara Utama) - 2022

=== Foreign ===
- Australia:
  - Honorary Officer of the Order of Australia - 2023
- Cambodia:
  - Grand Cross of the Royal Order of Sahametrei - 2023
- Malaysia:
  - Courageous Commander of the Most Gallant Order of Military Service (PGAT) - 2023
- Philippines:
  - Officer of the Philippine Legion of Honor
  - Philippine Republic Presidential Unit Citation
  - Bronze Cross Medal
- Singapore:
  - Meritorious Service Medal (Military) (PJG) - 2023
