= Kopkamtib =

Indonesian government internal agency

Operational Command for the Restoration of Security and Order
- Komando Operasi Pemulihan Keamanan dan Ketertiban

Agency overview
- Formed: 10 October 1965
- Dissolved: 5 September 1988
- Superseding agency: National Stability Assistance Coordination Agency (Badan Koordinasi Bantuan Pemantapan Stabilitas Nasional)
- Jurisdiction: Indonesia
- Status: Defunct
- Pangkopkamtib responsible: Soeharto (First); Benny Moerdani (Last)

The Operational Command for the Restoration of Security and Order (Indonesian: Komando Operasi Pemulihan Keamanan dan Ketertiban), or Kopkamtib, was a military body established to deal with the 1965 coup attempt operation in Indonesia, and was subsequently used by President Suharto's New Order regime to suppress dissent.

== Origins of Kopkamtib ==
Kopkamtib was established on 10 October 1965, ten days after the 30 September Movement killed six senior army generals in a failed coup attempt. Surviving general, Suharto, accepted President Sukarno's order to take control of the army on condition that he be handed full authority to restore order and security, an arrangement that was formalised by creating Kopkamtib.

The conflict between the forces of the military and their rivals the Communist Party of Indonesia (PKI), had predated the setting up of the organisation. The formation of Kopkamtib was a legitimisation of military and the New Order governments determination to organise the liquidation of the PKI and its related organisations.

By 1968 the PKI was no longer seen as a credible threat to military power, Kopkamtib's role as the New Order's main security apparatus remained, as did its surveillance of citizens. Kopkamtib played an important role in ensuring Golkar victory in the 1971 general elections. The organisation screened candidates and disqualifying about 20 per cent for political reasons.

Established immediately after the events of the 30 September Movement.It can be said that this institution was an instrument of Suharto's New Order power that coordinated a number of intelligence agencies, from Bakin to intelligence in every part of ABRI. In fact, in cases deemed to be disruptive to political and economic stability, Kopkamtib was able to break through the authority of the civilian department, even though ABRI's authority. By employing trusted military personnel to carry out tasks with political objectives in a broad and extraordinary sense, the Kopkamtib is at the core of the Indonesian government during a period of permanent martial law.

=== Without control ===
In 1974 the president took over Kopkamtib as an organization under the government by issuing Presidential Decree No. 9/1974. Even in 1982, Kopkamtib had become a military institution that was completely out of control by the community by not mentioning the institution in the Defense and Security Law that was being drafted DPR.

=== 23 years in power ===
During the 23 years of the New Order government, Kopkamtib has been the military government's task force to carry out security and intelligence activities. Through this series of activities, Kopkamtib was able to use all assets and personnel of the civil administration in Indonesia in the interests of the so-called New Order government as maintaining the implementation of development based on Pancasila and Constitution of Indonesia.

== Legal basis ==
=== Supersemar ===
Based on the law, the Kopkamtib was recorded as having the first legal basis through the Sebelas Maret Order (Supersemar) in the form of a presidential order from Sukarno to Major General Suharto to take steps deemed necessary to ensure the stability of national security.

=== Resolutions of MPR ===
In March 1973, the MPR issued MPR Resolution No.X / MPR / 1973 regarding Kopkamtib Regulations and Functions in the National Security System which gave power to the presidential office as the MPR mandate to take steps that were necessary for the success of guarding national development based on Pancasila democracy and the 1945 Constitution by:

- Maintain national security and order,
- Maintaining the unity and integrity of the Republic,
- Preventing the resurgence of the G30S / PKI movement and other threats of subversion within Indonesia.

== Functions and powers ==
=== Functions ===
Prior to its dissolution, Kopkamtib in accordance with Presidential Decree No.47 / 1978 had 4 main functions:

1. Coordinating the implementation of policies in maintaining the stability of national security and order.
2. Prevent any and all forms of activities related to the September 30th Movement/PKI and eradicate the remnants of the aformentioned, prevent and stop any and all acts of subversion and the formation of other extreme groups that threaten public security and order that endanger the safety and integrity of the state, a nation based on Pancasila and the 1945 Constitution.
3. Preventing the moral and mental influences caused by the G30S/PKI coup attempts and other cultural currents that are contrary to moral, mental and cultural norms based on the 5 points of Pancasila.
4. Guide communities to be more active in participating and taking responsibility in maintaining security and order in their local areas in support of National Government initiatives.

=== Emergency security agency ===
In the legal and organizational discourse, Kopkamtib was directed to become a military security agency on an emergency basis, starting with the promulgation of the subversion law of 1957. The structure in this law which later inspired the birth of Keppress No.47 / 1978 concerning the Kopkamtib organization in the administrative divisions of the nation. The Kopkamtib was per that law was assigned a Laksusda at the Kodam and Laksuswil at the Kowilhan level as the assistant to the commandant for security affairs, said structure lasting until September 1988, when the organization was disbanded and was later replaced by Bakorstanas.

=== Power ===
As coordinator of government security policies, Kopkamtib became part of the existing regulations in the country through much of its existence. This fact is shown by the use of all state instruments and elements of the state apparatus as well as making all measurements by referring to legal decisions that are reflected in the security law based on Pancasila and the 1945 Constitution, as defined by existing legislation of the period. Kopkamtib as previously acknowledged by Police General Hoegeng Imam Santoso had the official power to give orders to constables of the National Police in carrying out the process of interrogation, arrest and detention which is not regulated in existing national regulations and legislative acts.

== Later and post Suharto era ==
In September 1988, Suharto closed down the organisation. The succeeding organisation was the Coordinating Body for the Assistance of Improving National Stability (Indonesian: Badan Koordinasi Bantuan Pemantapan Stabilitas Nasional, Bakorstanas) which lasted until March 2000, when it was dismantled by the government of the Reform era. Bakorstanas aimed to restore, maintain and enhance national stability, as well provide advice and was headed by the ABRI Commander who reported directly to the president. Even so, almost all Kopkamtib staff and all the roles played by previous organizations were also carried out by this new institute.

Deputy Commanders were also known as Chief of Staff of the organisation

== Hierarchy ==
Pangkopkamtib in carrying out their duties is accountable to the president. But apart from that, in carrying out his daily duties, the Pangkopkamtib is responsible to Ministry of Defense (Indonesia) / Commander of the Indonesian National Armed Forces. Between 1974 and 1983, the Pangkopkamtib structure was accompanied by the Chief of Staff (Kaskopkamtib) and his personal secretary (Spri Kaskopkamtib) whose staff line was in the auxiliary leadership echelon.

Hierarchically there are 6 major frameworks for implementing Kopkamtib policies, they are:

1. President is in charge of all tasks and in special circumstances gives direct orders to the Laksusda through the Head of Police, Security and Security / Pangab.
2. Ministry of Defense (Indonesia) / Commander of the Indonesian National Armed Forces. as the day-to-day controller and supervises the task of carrying out the work of Kopkamtib.
3. 'Pangkopkamtib' is in charge of Determining general policies, controlling and making decisions about Kopkamtib security restoration operations.
4. 'Kaskopkamtib' coordinates and supervises security restoration operations.
5. 'Laksuswil' implements policies at the regional level whose duties are responsible to the Pangab and Pangkopkamtib.
6. 'Laksusda' implements policies at the regional level whose implementation of duties is generally responsible to Pangkowilhan and specifically to the Pangkopkamtib, Pangab and the President.

== Organization ==
In the organizational structure of the Kopkamtib, the President together with the Pangkopkamtib, 5 central executive echelons (commander of the Intel task force, head of the public relations information service, and the transportation unit, Kateperpu and the head of the Kopkamtib central prosecutor's prosecutor team) Laksuswil and Laksusda are linked along the Command line. Meanwhile, the Minister of Defense and Security together with Pangkopkamtib, Laksuswil and Laksusda are united with lines of control and supervision.

As for other things, including 5 executive echelons in direct coordination by Pangkopkamtib. Kopkamtib according to Presidential Decree No.47 / 1978 has an organizational structure consisting of:

- Control Echelon (Ministry of Defense (Indonesia) / Commander of the Indonesian National Armed Forces),
- Lead Echelon (Pangkopkamtib),
- Assistant Leadership Echelon which consists of:
  - Main supporting elements (Ministry of Defense (Indonesia) / Commander of the Indonesian National Armed Forces and Kaskopkamtib),
  - Staff elements (general staff: Assospol, Assintel, Asops, Aster and Askamtibmas Kopkamtib and Special Staff: Dansatgas Intel, Kadispen Humas, Dan Satub, Kateperpu, Katodsapu, Spri Pangkopkamtib and Spri Kaskopkamtib)
  - Service elements (Setkopkamtib and Paku Kopkamtib) and executing echelons are divided into two elements: Central Executive (Intel task force, Dispen Public Relations, relations unit, Teperpu, Kopkamtib central prosecutor's prosecutor team) and Regional Implementers (Laksuswil and Laksusda).

== Commanders ==
Position	Name	Year	Year
Commander	General Suharto	5 October 1965	19 November 1969
Commander	General Maraden Panggabean	19 November 1969	27 March 1973
Commander	General Sumitro	27 March 1973	28 January 1974
Commander	General Suharto	28 January 1974	17 April 1978
Commander	Admiral Sudomo	17 April 1978	29 March 1983
Commander	General Benny Moerdani	29 March 1983	5 September 1988

== Chiefs of staff/deputy commanders ==
Position	Name	Year
Deputy Commander	General Sumitro	1969 to 1971
Deputy Commander	Admiral Sudomo	1973 to 1978
Deputy Commander	Major General Daryatmo	1978
Deputy Commander	General Yoga Soegama	1978 to 1980
Deputy Commander	General Wijoyo Suyono	1980 to 1982

== See also ==
- Transition to the New Order
- New Order (Indonesia)
- List of historical secret police organizations
