= Ariyo Windutomo =

Indonesian military officer

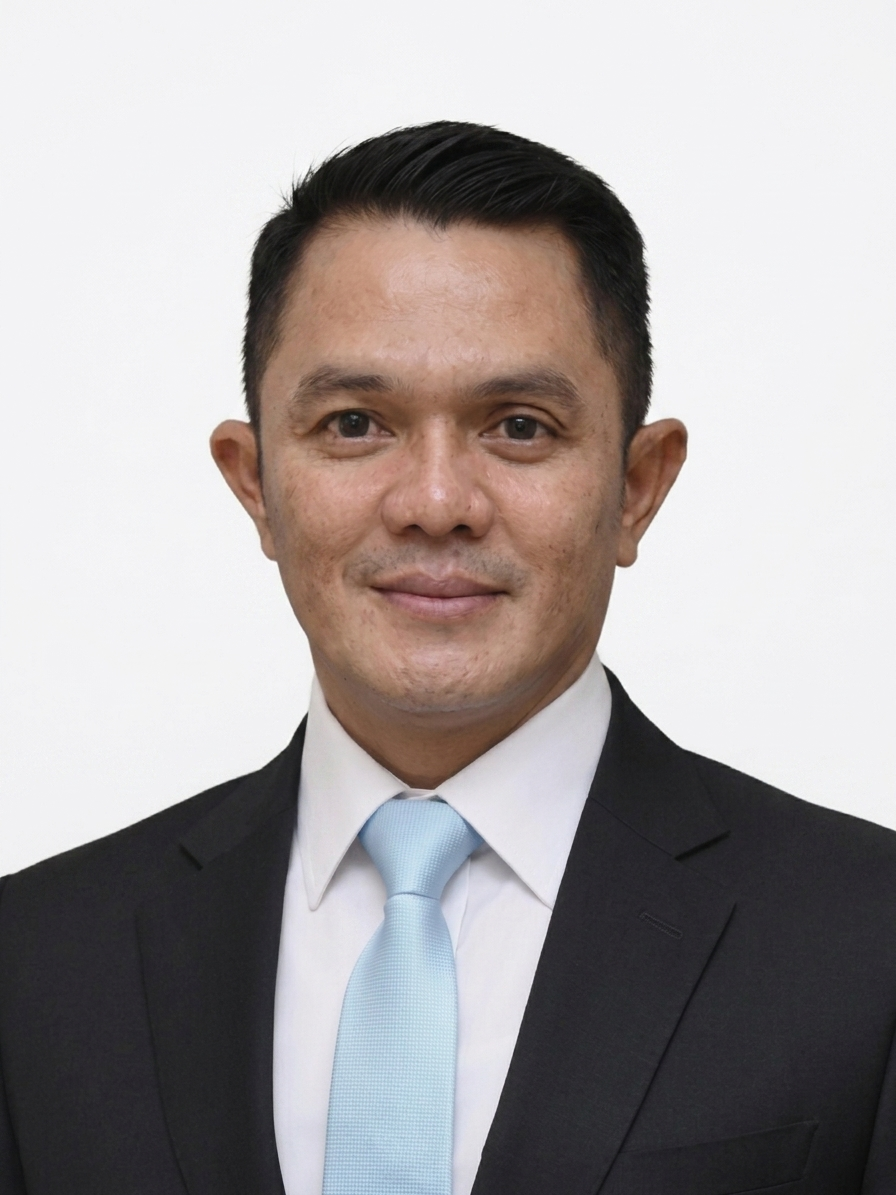
- Official portrait, 2025

Presidential Chief of Staff
- Acting
- Assumed office 4 November 2026
- President: Prabowo Subianto
- Preceded by: Listyo Sigit Prabowo

Chief of Presidential Secretariat
- Incumbent
- Assumed office 29 November 2024
- President: Prabowo Subianto
- Preceded by: Heru Budi Hartono

Personal details
- Born: 27 January 1974 (age 52)
- Spouse: Cindy Regina
- Relations: Kosasih (brother in-law)
- Education: Indonesian Military Academy

Military service
- Allegiance: Indonesia
- Branch/service: Indonesian Army
- Years of service: 1996 – now
- Rank: Lieutenant general
- Unit: Infantry
- Service no.: 11960039070174

Ariyo Windutomo (born 27 January 1974) is an Indonesian military officer who is currently serving as the Chief of Presidential Secretariat since 29 November 2024 and, most recently, was appointed as the acting presidential chief of staff on 4 November 2026. Prior to his current positions, Ariyo served in army units and the defence ministry, with his last position being the chief supervisor of the Indonesian Defence University.

== Life and education ==
Ariyo was born on 27 January 1974. His father, Soemarno MS, was a brigadier general of the equipment corps in the Indonesian Army. Ariyo’s older sister, Asri Wiraningsih Kosasih, is married to Major-General Kosasih, currently the commander of Siliwangi Regional Military Command.

Ariyo graduated from the Indonesian Military Academy in 1996 and was commissioned as a second lieutenant in the infantry. Ariyo is educated at the Indonesian Air Force Command and Staff College and holds a master's degree in defence management from the Indonesian Defence University.

== Military career ==
As a major, Ariyo assumed office as the chief of staff of the Depok Military District on 3 May 2011, during which he oversaw renovations of state elementary schools in the city by the military district. He was then transferred to the territorial staff of the Cenderawasih Military Region in Papua.

Ariyo was assigned to the defence ministry as a colonel and served as a senior analyst in the ministry's personnel bureau. He then became the head of personnel career section in the bureau. Through a decree by defense minister Prabowo Subianto on 4 November 2022, Ariyo was appointed as the chief of general affairs bureau in the ministry. He officially assumed office two weeks later and was promoted to the rank of brigadier general shortly afterwards. During his tenure, Ariyo was entrusted to organize a presidential-level dusk parade and gala dinner event on the occasion of the armed forces 78th anniversary on 5 October 2023.

On 1 April 2024, Ariyo received another promotion with his appointment as the chief supervisor of the Indonesian Defence University through an armed forces commander decree. He officially assumed the new position on 26 April and was promoted to the rank of major general on 15 May. He continued to retain his old post as the chief of general affairs bureau.

Shortly after Prabowo Subianto became president, Ariyo was appointed as the chief of presidential secretariat through an armed forces commander decree on 31 October 2024. A few days after his appointment was made, on 5 November Ariyo was relieved from his position as chief of general affairs bureau. He assumed office as chief of presidential secretariat on 29 November and resigned from his position at the Indonesian Defence University on 18 December. Ariyo's appointment for the position was criticized due to his status as an active military officer assigned to civilian position. Ariyo's rank was promoted to lieutenant general on 16 March 2026. On 4 November 2026, Ariyo was appointed acting presidential chief of staff after the previous officeholder, Listyo Sigit Prabowo, was arrested for wiretapping the president's communication illegally.

== Personal life ==
Ariyo is married to Cindy Regina. They have three daughters.
