= Moeldoko =

Indonesian general

General (Ret.) Moeldoko
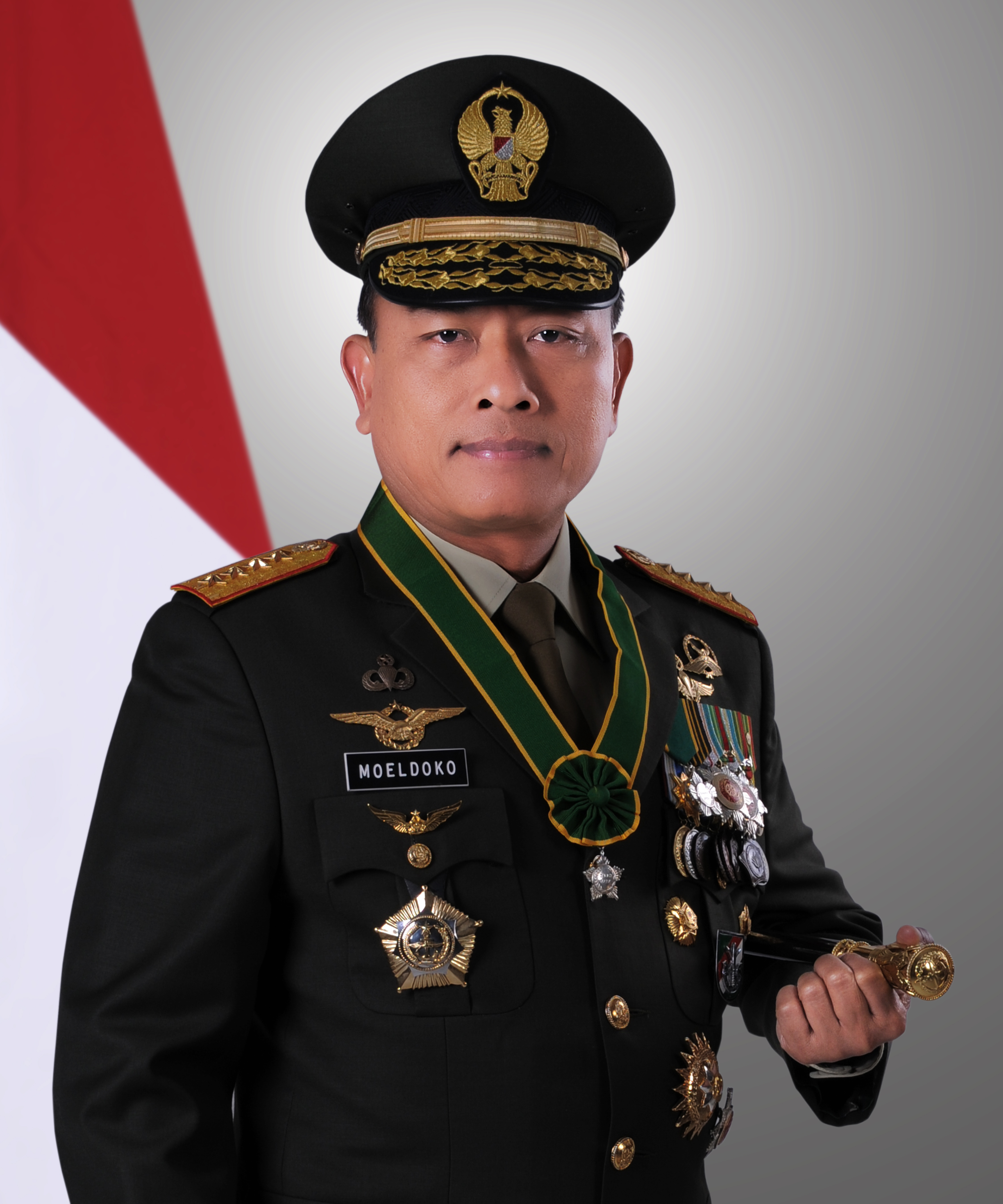
- Official portrait, 2013

3rd Presidential Chief of Staff
- In office 17 January 2018 – 20 October 2024
- President: Joko Widodo
- Preceded by: Teten Masduki
- Succeeded by: Anto Mukti Putranto

Commander of the National Armed Forces
- In office 30 August 2013 – 8 July 2015
- President: Susilo Bambang Yudhoyono; Joko Widodo
- Preceded by: Admiral Agus Suhartono
- Succeeded by: General Gatot Nurmantyo

Chief of Staff of the Army
- In office 20 May 2013 – 30 August 2013
- President: Susilo Bambang Yudhoyono
- Preceded by: General Pramono Edhie Wibowo
- Succeeded by: General Budiman

Commander of Military District III/Siliwangi
- In office October 2010 – August 2011
- Preceded by: Major General Pramono Edhie Wibowo
- Succeeded by: Major General Muhammad Munir

Commander of Military District XII/Tanjungpura
- In office June 2010 – October 2010
- Preceded by: New office
- Succeeded by: Major General Geerhan Lantara

Commander of 1st Kostrad Infantry Division
- In office January 2010 – June 2010
- Preceded by: Major General Hatta Syafrudin
- Succeeded by: Brigadier General Adi Mulyono

Personal details
- Born: 8 July 1957 (age 69) Purwoasri, Kediri, Indonesia
- Party: Independent
- Other political affiliations: Hanura (2016–2018)
- Spouse: Koesni Harningsih
- Children: 2
- Education: Indonesian Military Academy (AKABRI) - 1981

Military service
- Allegiance: Indonesia
- Branch/service: Indonesian Army
- Years of service: 1981–2015
- Rank: General
- Unit: Infantry

Moeldoko (pronounced [muldoko]; born 8 July 1957) is an Indonesian government official, businessman, and retired general who served as the Chief of Staff of Presidency for President Joko Widodo from 2018 to 2024, previously serving as Commander of the Indonesian National Armed Forces. He graduated from the Indonesian Military Academy (AKABRI) in 1981 and received the Adhi Makayasa medal as valedictorian of his class. On 27 August 2013, he was appointed Commander of the National Armed Forces by President Susilo Bambang Yudhoyono and approved by the People's Representative Council (Dewan Perwakilan Rakyat, DPR) after serving as the Chief of Staff of the Army for only three months. He succeeded Admiral (Ret.) Agus Suhartono who retired in May 2013.

== Military career ==
Moeldoko has been assigned to several military operations during his career. The most notable of these operations are: Operation Seroja in East Timor (1984) and Garuda Contingent XI/A for The Congo (1995). In addition, his overseas assignments and operations include stints in New Zealand (1983 and 1987), Singapore and Japan (1991), Iraq-Kuwait (1992), USA, and Canada.

Within seven months of 2013, General Moeldoko was granted three promotions: first as Deputy Army Chief of Staff in February, then as Army Chief of Staff in May, and as Commander of Indonesian National Armed Forces (TNI) on August 30. In the same year, he also received a Doctorate degree in public administration science from the Faculty of Social and Political Science of the Universitas Indonesia (UI).

In February 2014, he met with the Vice Chairman of China's Central Military Commission, General Fan Changlong in Beijing, China, to discuss bilateral ties. These discussions were related to maritime and anti-terrorism cooperation as well as the Komodo multilateral joint exercise that involves all 10 ASEAN member states together with Australia, India, Japan, New Zealand, Russia, South Korea and USA. To promote friendship and cooperation, General Moeldoko met with Vietnamese General Phùng Quang Thanh, Minister of National Defence of Vietnam in February, 2014 and with Defense Secretary Voltaire Gazmin and Armed Forces of the Philippines General Emmanuel Bautista at Camp Aguinaldo.

Although he has never served outside the military, General Moeldoko has been active at home and abroad. He has been mentioned as potential VP and running mate of Joko Widodo, the governor of Jakarta and candidate in the 2014 Indonesian presidential elections, though he ultimately is not selected as a candidate.

== Political career ==
After retiring from the military, Moeldoko joined Hanura Party in 2016. On 17 January 2018, Indonesian president Joko Widodo chose him to be the Presidential Chief of Staff.

In 2021, he was elected as a Democratic Party General Chairman in a heavily disputed extraordinary congress.

== Controversies ==
General Moeldoko has been involved in handling the incident of the turning-back asylum boats in Australia. He is also involved in the decision to name an Indonesian navy ship after marines associated with MacDonald House Bombing in Singapore in 1965. He had also been criticized for allegedly wearing a $100,000 Richard Mille Felipe Massa collection watch while millions of Indonesians are living in poverty. Moeldoko stated that the watch is a Chinese-made fake replica and not a real one.

== Personal life ==
Moeldoko was born in Kediri, East Java as the youngest son in a family of twelve children. He attended an agricultural vocational school in the town of Jombang in East Java and the joined the military academy in Magelang, Central Java. Moeldoko was married to Koesni Harningsih (d. 2023) and has two children, Randy Bimantoro and Joanina Rachma.

== Awards and distinctions ==
During his military career, General Moeldoko has received many awards and distinctions. The Pingat Jasa Gemilang (Tentera) was conferred to him by the President of Singapore Tony Tan Keng Yam in recognition of his contributions in strengthening ties between the Indonesian and Singaporean armies.

=== Medals and decorations ===
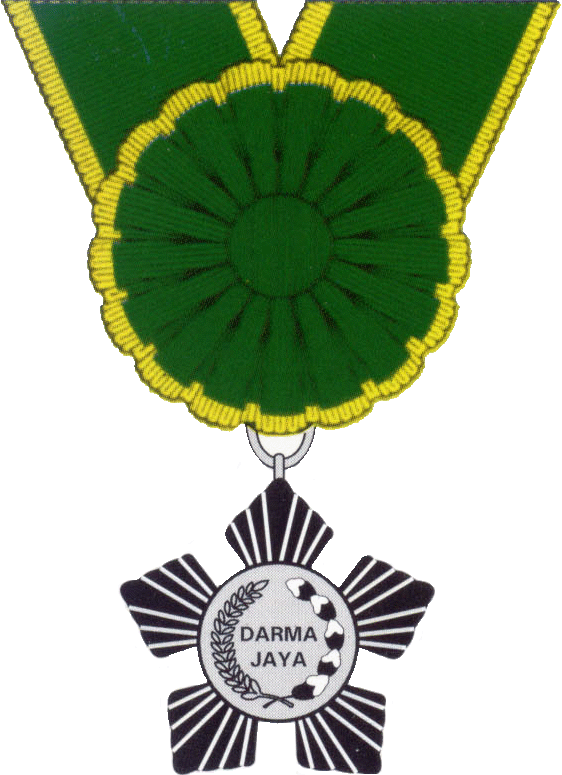
[A] Mil. Disting.
Service Star

[B] Mil. Meritorious
Service Medal
(Singapore)

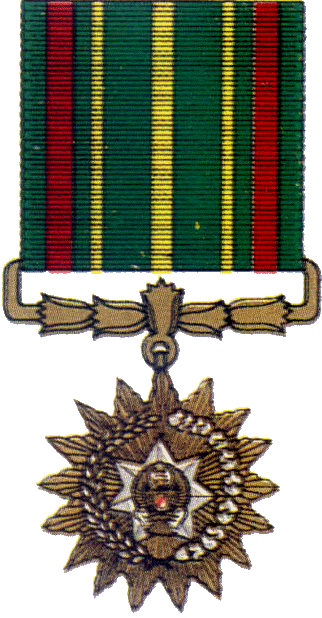
[C] Def. Meritorious
Service Star

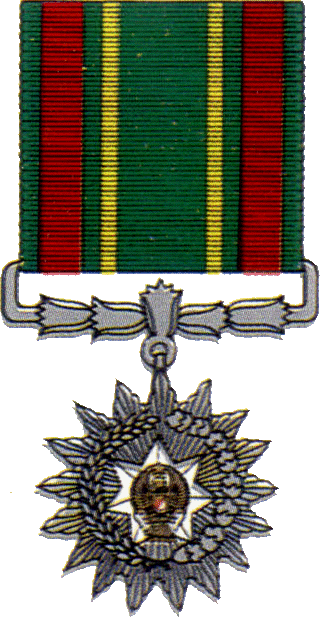
[D] Army Meritorious
Service Star

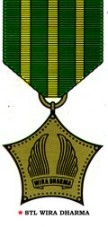
[E] Malaysia/Borneo Mil.
Campaign Medal
- [A] Indonesia Military Distinguished Service Star.
  (Bintang Dharma)
- [B] Singapore military Meritorious Service Medal.
  (Pingat Jasa Gemilang (Tentera))
- National Police Meritorious Service Star. (Bintang Bhayangkara)
- [C] Defence Meritorious Service Star – 2nd Class.
  (Bintang Yudha Dharma)
- Army Meritorious Service Star – 2nd Class.
  (Bintang Kartika Eka Paksi Pratama)
- Defence Meritorious Service Star – 3rd Class.
  (Bintang Yudha Dharma)
- [D] Army Meritorious Service Star – 3rd Class.
  (Bintang Kartika Eka Paksi)
- Dharma Santala Medal.
- Medals of 24 years, 16 years, 8 years of loyalty service.

=== Foreign honours ===
- Singapore :
  - Meritorious Service Medal (Military) (2013)
  - Distinguished Service Order (Military) (2015)
- Brunei : Order of Paduka Keberanian Laila Terbilang 1st Class (2014)
- Philippines : Commander of the Philippine Legion of Honor (2014)
- Malaysia :
  - Courageous Commander of The Most Gallant Order of Military Service (2015)
  - Honorary Commander of the Order of Loyalty to the Crown of Malaysia (2015)
- Thailand : Knight Grand Cross of the Order of the Crown of Thailand (2015)

== See also ==
- Indonesian National Armed Forces
- List of Indonesian Army Chief of Staffs
- Orders, decorations, and medals of Indonesia
- United Indonesia Cabinet
- List of Indonesians

Military offices
Preceded by Hatta Syafruddin	Commander of Infantry Division 1/Kostrad; 2010	Succeeded by Adi Mulyono
Preceded by New office	Commander of Military Area Command XII /Tanjungpura; 2010	Succeeded by Geerhan Lantara
Preceded by Pramono Edhie Wibowo	Commander of Military Area Command III/Siliwangi; 2010–2011	Succeeded by M. Munir
Preceded by Budiman	Indonesian Army Deputy Chief of Staff; 2013	Succeeded by M. Munir
Preceded by Pramono Edhie Wibowo	Indonesian Army Chief of Staff; 2013	Succeeded by Budiman
Preceded by Agus Suhartono	Commander of Indonesian Armed Forces (TNI); 2013–2015	Succeeded by Gatot Nurmantyo
