= Suyudi Ario Seto =

Indonesian police general

- Official portrait, 2026

26th Chief of the Indonesian National Police
- Incumbent
- Assumed office 1 October 2026
- President: Prabowo Subianto
- Preceded by: Listyo Sigit Prabowo

Head of the National Narcotics Agency
- Incumbent
- Assumed office 25 August 2025
- Preceded by: Marthinus Hukom

Chief of the Banten Regional Police
- In office 26 June 2024 – 5 August 2025
- Preceded by: Abdul Karim
- Succeeded by: Hengki

Chief of the Jakarta Metropolitan Regional Police
- In office 27 March 2023 – 26 June 2024
- Preceded by: Hendro Pandowo
- Succeeded by: Djati Wiyoto Abadhy

Personal details
- Born: July 14, 1973 (age 53) Pandeglang, Banten, Indonesia
- Children: 2
- Relatives: Nurfaizi Suwandi (father-in-law)
- Education: Indonesia Police Academy (1994)

Military service
- Allegiance: Indonesia
- Branch/service: Indonesian National Police
- Years of service: 1994–present
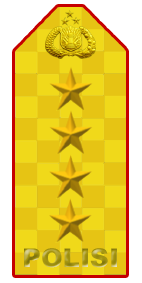
- Rank: Police General
- Unit: Criminal Investigation

Suyudi Ario Seto (born Jakarta, 14 July 1973) is a High-ranking Officer of the Polri who has served as Chief of the Indonesian National Police (Kapolri) since October 1, 2026.

Suyudi, a 1994 Police Academy graduate, has specialist experience in the field of investigation. He began his career by serving as Head of Unit II of the Mobile Brigade of the Polda Metro Jaya. He then served as Chief of the Pasar Minggu Police, Head of the Criminal Investigation Unit of the West Jakarta Metro Police, Head of the Ranmor Sub-Directorate of the General Criminal Investigation Directorate of the Metro Jaya Police, Chief of the Central Jakarta Metro Police, and Director of General Criminal Investigation of the Metro Jaya Police. Suyudi was briefly appointed as deputy director of Cyber Crimes at the National Police Criminal Investigation Agency. He earned one star while serving as Deputy Chief of the Metro Jaya Police in 2023. A year later, he received a two-star promotion as Chief of the Banten Police. In 2025, Suyudi rose to three stars by serving as Head of the National Narcotics Agency.

During his time as a detective, Suyudi was involved in several high-profile cases, such as uncovering the acid attack on a KPK investigator. He was also involved in the investigation of the Pulomas 2016 robbery and murder in Pulomas, East Jakarta.

== Personal life ==
Suyudi is married to Dewi Yuali and has two children.

== Education ==
Suyudi is a graduate of the Indonesian Armed Forces Academy (Akabri) or now the Police Academy (Akpol) in 1994. Faculty of Law, Langlangbuana University, Police education he has taken includes PTIK (2003), and SESPIMTI (2018). He earned a Master of Science degree from the Master of Police Science Studies, University of Indonesia in 2010.

== Medal ==
1st	Bintang Bhayangkara Pratama (November 11, 2025)	Bintang Bhayangkara Nararya	Satyalancana Pengabdian 24 Tahun
2nd	Satyalancana Pengabdian 16 Years	Satyalancana Pengabdian 8 Years	Satyalancana Jana Utama
3rd	Satyalancana Ksatria Bhayangkara	Satyalancana Karya Bhakti	Satyalancana Bhakti Pendidikan
4th	Satyalancana Bhakti Nusa	Satyalancana Dharma Nusa	Satyalancana Operasi Kepolisian

Police appointments
Preceded by Listyo Sigit Prabowo	Chief of the Indonesian National Police; 2026–present	Incumbent
