= Listyo Sigit Prabowo =

Indonesian police general

Police-General Listyo Sigit Prabowo
- Official portrait, 2026

Presidential Chief of Staff
- In office 1 October 2026 – 4 November 2026
- President: Prabowo Subianto
- Preceded by: Dudung Abdurachman
- Succeeded by: Ariyo Windutomo (acting)

25th Chief of the Indonesian National Police
- In office 27 January 2021 – 1 October 2026
- President: Joko Widodo; Prabowo Subianto
- Preceded by: Idham Azis
- Succeeded by: Suyudi Ario Seto

Chief of Criminal Investigation Agency
- In office 6 December 2019 – 27 January 2021
- Preceded by: Idham Azis
- Succeeded by: Agus Andrianto

Chief of Profession and Internal Security Division
- In office 13 August 2018 – 6 December 2019
- Preceded by: Martuani Sormin
- Succeeded by: Ignatius Sigit Widiatmono

Chief of Banten Regional Police
- In office 5 October 2016 – 13 August 2018
- Preceded by: Ahmad Dofiri
- Succeeded by: Teddy Minahasa Putra

Personal details
- Born: 5 May 1969 (age 57) Ambon, Maluku, Indonesia
- Spouse: Juliati Sapta Dewi Magdalena
- Police career
- Allegiance: Indonesia
- Branch: Indonesian National Police
- Service years: 1991–present
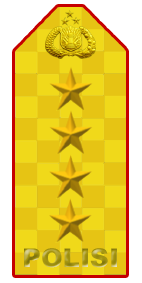
- Rank: Police-General

Listyo Sigit Prabowo (born 5 May 1969) is an Indonesian high-ranking police officer who was the Chief of the Indonesian National Police (Kapolri) from 2021 to 2026 and the presidential chief of staff from October to November 2026. Previously, he was the head of the Criminal Investigation Agency (Bareskrim).

== Early life and education ==
Listyo was born on 5 May 1969 in Ambon, Maluku, as the son of Sutrisno, an air force officer of Javanese descent from Yogyakarta who was posted in that city. He graduated from the National Police Academy in 1991. He is married to Juliati Sapta Dewi Magdalena (Diana Listyo). The couple has two sons and a daughter. He is also the second Protestant Christian head of police in the history of Indonesia after Widodo Budidarmo.

== Career ==
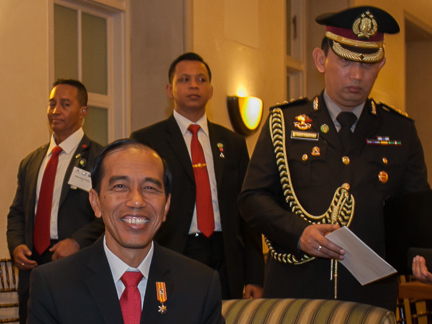
Listyo (right) when he was the aide-de-camp of President Joko Widodo in 2015

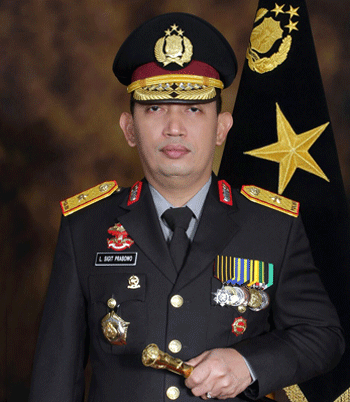
Listyo as Chief of Banten Regional Police, 2016

He began his career as a police officer in the Tangerang police division of the Banten provincial police district. He held several posts, such as Chief of Police of Pati (2009), Chief of Police of Sukoharjo (2009), Deputy Chief of Semarang Metropolitan Police (2010), and Deputy Chief of Surakarta Metropolitan Police (2011). In 2014, he was assigned to be President Joko Widodo's adjutant. Then he served as chief of Banten Regional Police (2016), Chief Division of Profession and Internal Security Division (2018), and chief of Criminal Investigation Agency (2019).

On 27 January 2021, he was appointed as chief of National Police. As part of his appointment, he was promoted to a four-star police general. He is the second Christian to serve in the office. He was also the second-youngest Chief of National Police at the time he took office (51 years, 267 days), the record which was still held by Police General Tito Karnavian, who was 51 years, 261 days when he took office in July 2016.

General Listyo is known by his vision of police leadership "Presisi" (prediktif, responsibilitas, tranparansi, berkeadilan. translated as predictive-responsible-transparent-equitable), as he presented to the House of Representatives committee during his fit-and-proper test after being the President's sole candidate. This vision, however, will continue what his predecessor General Tito did with his then-vision "Promoter" (professional, modern, dan terpercaya. translated as professional, modern, and trusted).

In the summer of 2022, he presided over the investigation into the murder of Nofriansyah Yosua Hutabarat, overcoming an alleged cover-up by police generals to conceal an alleged premeditated murder by Inspector General Ferdy Sambo, head of internal affairs of the Indonesian National Police.

Rank History
Rank	Position	Year
Police Grand Commissioner	Aide-de-camp to the President of The Republic of Indonesia	2014
Police-Brigadier General	Chief of Banten Regional Police	2016
Police-Inspector General	Chief of Profession and Internal Security Division	2018
Police-Commissioner General	Chief of Criminal Investigation Agency	2019
Police-General	Chief of Indonesian National Police	2021

== Arrest ==
On November 3, Listyo and 2 other high ranking police officers; namely Inspector General Eko Hadi Santoso and Inspector General Ahrie Sonta Nasution was named suspect in illegal espionage scandal against President Prabowo Subianto. The investigation concludes that Listyo and his associates has been wiretapping Prabowo's phone since 2025. Investigation also found that Listyo also wiretapped into NGOs, media, politicians, and businessmen. Listyo's arrest was followed with his dismissal as the presidential chief of staff the next day.

== Honours ==

1st row	National Police Meritorious Service Star, 1st Class (Bintang Bhayangkara Utama) (2021)	Army Meritorious Service Star, 1st Class (Bintang Kartika Eka Paksi Utama) (2022)	Navy Meritorious Service Star, 1st Class (Bintang Jalasena Utama) (2022)
2nd row	Air Force Meritorius Service Star, 1st Class (Bintang Swa Bhuwana Paksa Utama) (2022)	Grand Meritorious Military Order Star, 2nd Class (Bintang Yudha Dharma Pratama) (2022)	National Police Meritorious Service Star, 2nd Class (Bintang Bhayangkara Pratama) (2019)
3rd row	National Police Meritorious Service Star, 3rd Class (Bintang Bhayangkara Nararya)	Courageous Commander The Most Gallant Police Order (P.G.P.P.) - Malaysia (2024)	Medal of the Order of Timor-Leste (2025)
4th row	Police Long Service Medal 24 years of service	Police Long Service Medal 16 years of service	Police Long Service Medal 8 years of service
5th row	Medal for Advancing Police Organization (Satyalancana Jana Utama)	Medal for Meritious Policing Duty (Satyalancana Ksatria Bhayangkara)	Medal for Concrete Work in the Police Force (Satyalancana Karya Bhakti)
6th row	Medal for Police Education (Satyalancana Bhakti Pendidikan)	Medal for Police Duty in International Peacekeeping (Satyalancana Bhakti Buana)	Medal for Police Duty in Remote Regions (Satyalancana Bhakti Nusa)
7th row	Medal for National Defense Service (Satyalancana Dharma Nusa)	Medal for Police Operation (Satyalancana Operasi Kepolisian)	Medal for Service in the Field of Social Welfare (Satyalancana Kebhaktian Sosial)

Brevet
Brevet Selam Polri
Brevet Penyidik
Pin Reserse Kriminal
Pin Korps Brimob
Pin Propam (2018)
Pin Setia Waspada Paspampres
Pin Alumni Sespimti Polri
Pin Alumni Lemhannas
Pin Emas Kapolri
Wing Penerbang TNI AU Kelas I (2021)
Brevet Cakra Kostrad (2022)
Brevet Komando Kopassus (2022)
Brevet Trimedia Intai Amfibi Korps Marinir (2023)
Brevet Anti-Teror Aspek Laut (2023)
Pin Gadjah Mada Puspomad (2023)
