= Agus Andrianto =

Indonesian politician (born 1967)

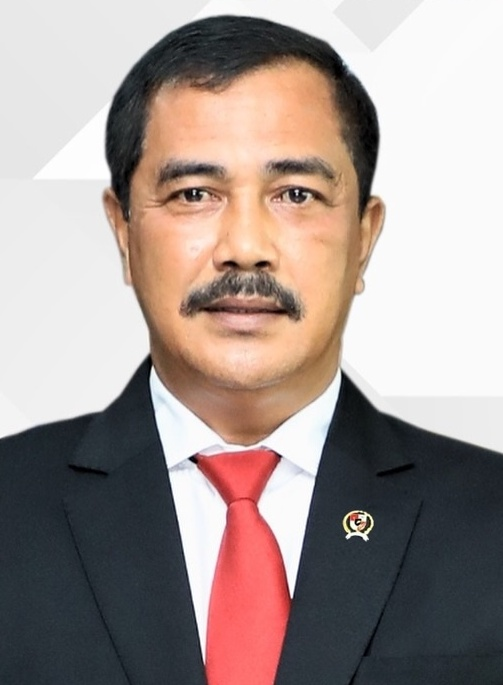

1st Minister of Immigration and Correction
- Incumbent
- Assumed office 21 October 2024
- President: Prabowo Subianto
- Preceded by: Office established

Personal details
- Born: 16 February 1967 (age 59)
- Party: Independent

Agus Andrianto (born 16 February 1967) is an Indonesian politician and retired police officer serving as Minister of Immigration and Correction since 2024. He was the head of the Criminal Investigation Agency from 2021 to 2023, and served as deputy chief of the Indonesian National Police from 2023 to 2024.
