= Australia–Indonesia spying scandal =

Australia–Indonesia relations

- Australia: Indonesia

The Australia–Indonesia spying scandal developed from allegations made in 2013 by The Guardian and the Australian Broadcasting Corporation (ABC), based on leaked documents, that the Australian Signals Directorate had in 2009 attempted to monitor the mobile phone calls of Indonesian President Susilo Bambang Yudhoyono, his wife Kristiani Herawati, and senior officials.

== Background ==
Beginning in June 2013, reports from media outlets including The Guardian and The Washington Post revealed operational details of the US National Security Agency's mass surveillance of US and foreign nationals. The reports were based on a series of secret documents from 2009 leaked by former NSA contractor Edward Snowden. Further disclosures indicated that the NSA's surveillance operations extended to include the intelligence-gathering agencies of US allies, including the British Government Communications Headquarters and Australia's Defence Signals Directorate, members of the UKUSA or "Five Eyes" security agreement.

In October 2013, Der Spiegel reported that German intelligence services had received "credible evidence" that Chancellor Angela Merkel's mobile phone had been targeted by the NSA. Later that month reports from Der Spiegel and Fairfax Media stated that Australian embassies and diplomatic posts in Asia were being used to intercept phone calls and data, including during the 2007 United Nations Climate Change Conference.

In 2004 during the East Timor crisis, Indonesia bugged Australia's embassy in Jakarta and tried to recruit Australians as spies, retiring Indonesian intelligence chief General Abdullah Mahmud Hendropriyono admitted.

== Response ==
The allegations prompted Indonesia to recall its ambassador to Australia, Nadjib Riphat Kesoema, in November 2013. Australian Prime Minister Tony Abbott initially declined to apologise or comment on the matter, prompting accusations from President Yudhoyono that he had "belittled" Indonesia's response to the issue. Speaking to Parliament, Abbott went on to argue that Australia "should not be expected to apologise for...reasonable intelligence-gathering activities". The next day, Indonesia responded by reviewing all areas of bilateral cooperation, including on issues around people smuggling, a major component of the Abbott government's Operation Sovereign Borders policy.

The Australian government's response to the issue prompted criticism from current and former leaders in both countries, including former Prime Minister Malcolm Fraser, former Vice President Jusuf Kalla, Indonesian Foreign Minister Marty Natalegawa, in addition to negative reporting in the Indonesian media. Demonstrations were also held outside Australia's embassy in Jakarta.

In contrast, Opposition Leader Bill Shorten declined to criticise Abbott, instead emphasising the importance of the bilateral relationship, and arguing that the government's response should be a "Team Australia moment". Former Australian Foreign Minister Alexander Downer argued that the diplomatic response to the issue was "beyond the control" of Tony Abbott's government.

The allegations, and Indonesia's response, attracted significant coverage in Indonesian and international media, particularly following allegations that the US National Security Agency had attempted to monitor the mobile phone of German Chancellor Angela Merkel.

== See also ==
- Australia-East Timor spying scandal
