= Tri Budi Utomo =

Indonesian army officer (born 1971)

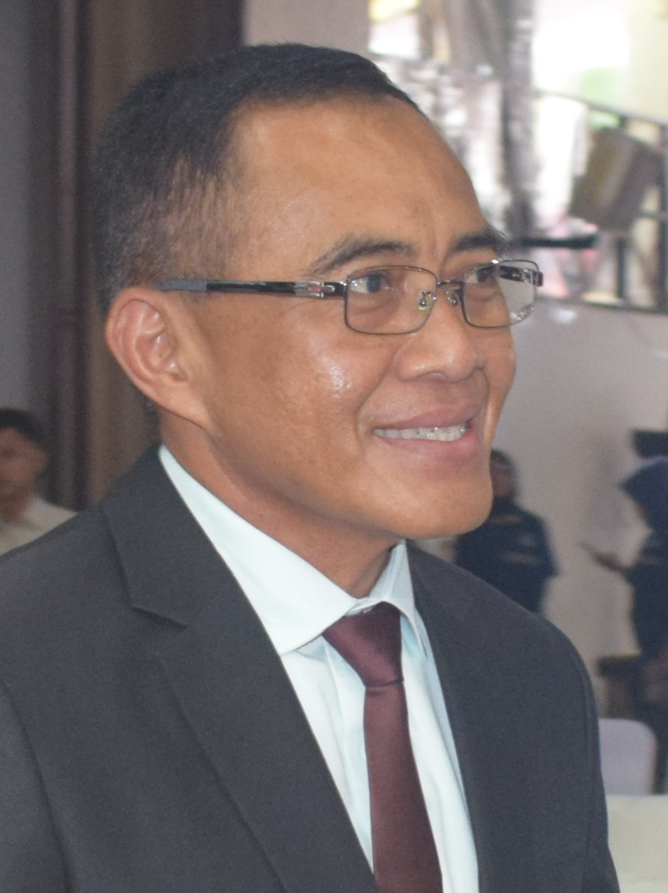

Secretary General of the Ministry of Defense
- Incumbent
- Assumed office 14 November 2024
- Minister: Sjafrie Sjamsoeddin
- Preceded by: Donny Ermawan Taufanto

Personal details
- Born: February 6, 1971 (age 55) Surakarta, Central Java
- Spouse: Rahma Dewi Suryantari
- Children: 2
- Education: Indonesian Military Academy

Military service
- Allegiance: Indonesia
- Branch/service: Indonesian Army
- Years of service: 1994 – now
- Rank: Lieutenant general

Tri Budi Utomo (born 6 February 1971) is an Indonesian army general who is the army deputy chief of staff, serving since 16 October 2026. Prior to his appointment, he held a number of key positions within the military, including Commander of the Mulawarman (East Kalimantan) Regional Military Command, Commander of the Presidential Security Force and Deputy Commander of Kopassus, the Indonesian Army Special Forces Command.

== Early life ==
Born in Surakarta, Central Java, on 6 February 1971, Tri Budi Utomo is a graduate of the Military Academy (Akmil) in 1994, where he was commissioned as an infantry second lieutenant on July 26, 1994. He then joined the red beret Kopassus corps upon completing the special corps education in 1995.

== Military career ==
Tri served within the Kopassus during his early years in the military, where he was assigned to military operations in East Timor in 1998, Irian Jaya in 2001, and counterinsurgency in Aceh in 2004. He attended a course on counterterrorism and was instructed to attend the Indonesian Army Command and General Staff College in 2009. He was promoted to lieutenant colonel in 2010 and became the commander of the 811th battalion in Kopassus from 2011 to 2012. He then served as commander of the Bandar Lampung city military district until 2013. He then returned to Kopassus with the rank of colonel, serving as the assistant for personnel affairs to commander Muhammad Herindra from 2015 to 2016 and as commander of Kopassus's counterterrorism unit from 2016 to 2017. He then attended the Armed Forces Command and General Staff College in 2017.

In 2018, Tri was transferred to the Paspampres (presidential security force) as commander of group A, which responsible for the security of President Joko Widodo. He served in this role until 2019, during which time he participated in a security detail for the president's visit to a volatile Afghanistan. Following his time in Paspampres, he was promoted to Commander of the Wijayakrama Military Area, covering the northern half of Jakarta, from 2019 to 2020. This role earned him a promotion to brigadier general when the military command was re-designated as a type A command.

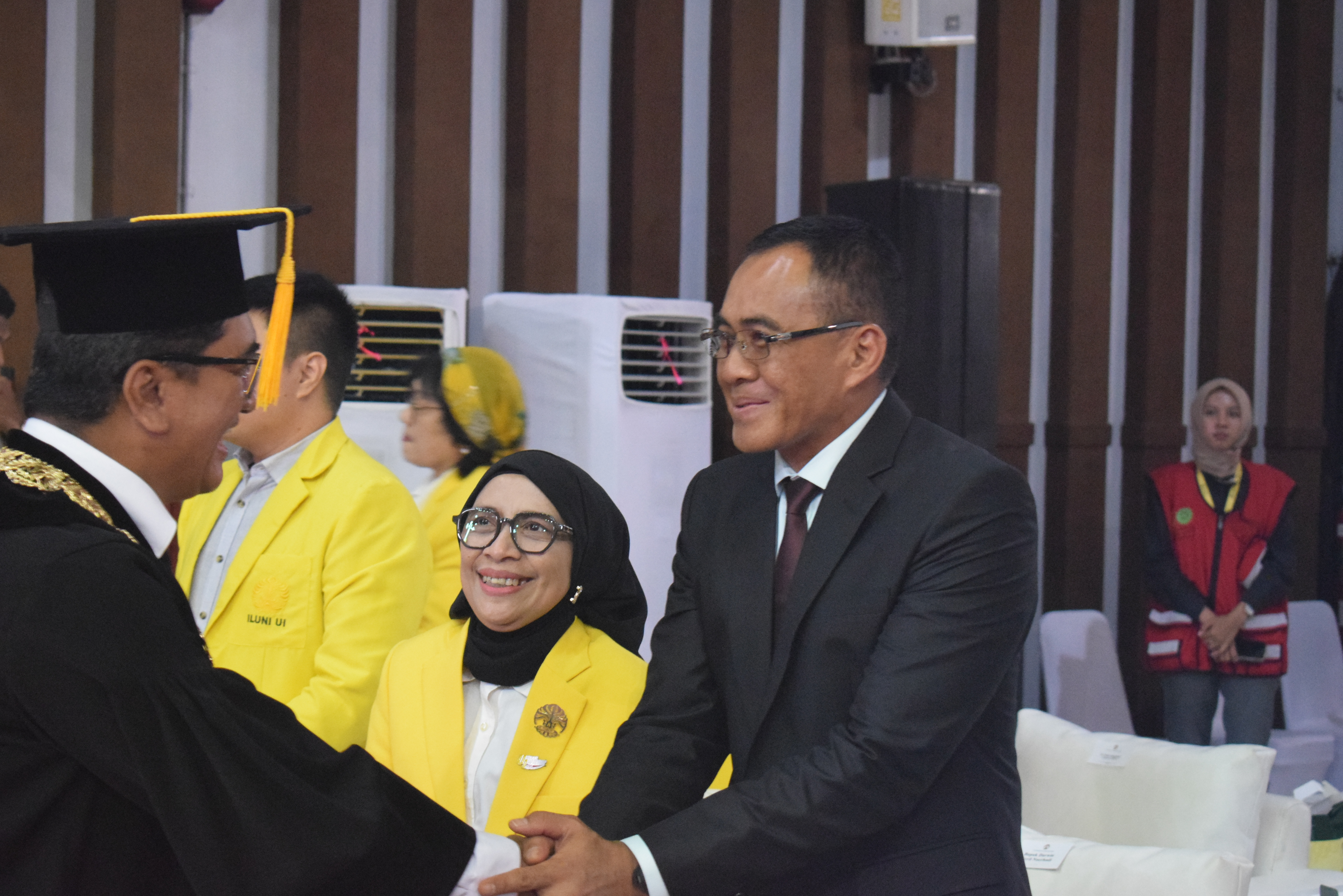
Tri Budi Utomo shaking hands with UI rector Heri Hermansyah.

In 2020, he returned to Kopassus as deputy commanding, serving until 2021. His superior, the commanding general Mohamad Hasan, had also served as commander of Paspampres's group A. His career continued its upward trajectory when he was appointed commander of Paspampres in August 2021, a position he held until June 2022, before being appointed commander of the East Kalimantan based Mulawarman Regional Military Command. On 18 October 2024, Tri was appointed as secretary general of the defense ministry. He was installed on 14 November and was promoted to lieutenant general on 6 December. On 21 February 2025, he was appointed to the ex-officio post of the president commissioner of the state-owned company Len Industries.

Following the appointment of the army deputy chief of staff Muhammad Saleh Mustafa as the deputy minister of agriculture, on 6 October 2026 Tri was appointed to fill in the position by the armed forces commander decree. He was installed for the position on 16 October.

== Personal life ==
Tri is married to Rahma Dewi Suryantari and has a son and a daughter.

== Dates of rank ==
Second lieutenant	26 July 1994
First lieutenant	1 October 1997
Captain	1 October 2000
Major	1 October 2006
Lieutenant colonel	1 October 2010
Colonel	1 April 2015
Brigadier general	9 April 2020
Major general	2 August 2021
Lieutenant general	6 December 2024
