= National Defense Council (Indonesia) =

- Dewan Pertahanan Nasional
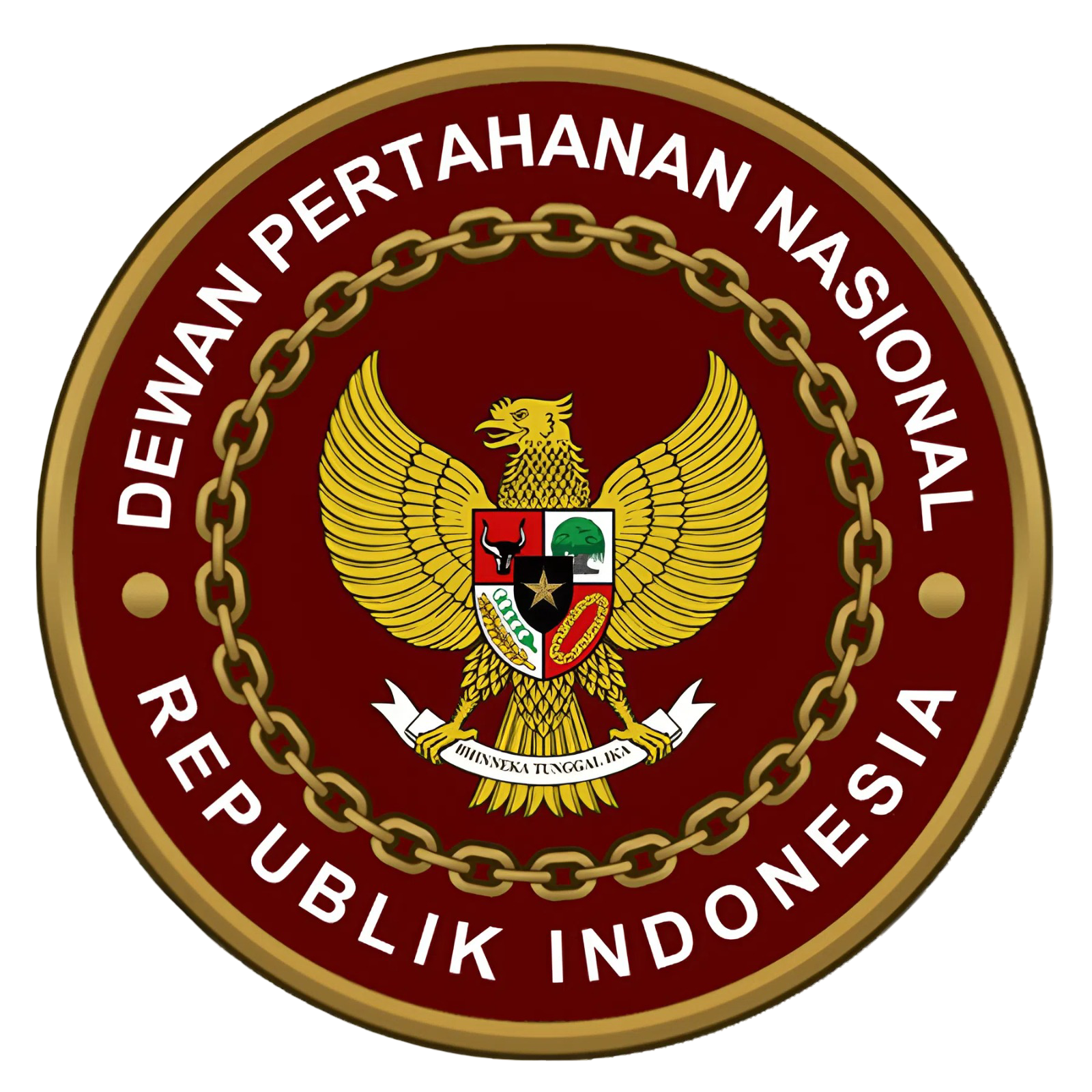
- Seal of the National Defense Council

Agency overview
- Formed: 14 December 2024
- Preceding Agency: National Resilience Council
- Jurisdiction: Government of Indonesia
- Headquarters: Office of the Ministry of Defense, Jalan Medan Merdeka Barat No. 13-14 Central Jakarta 10110 Jakarta, Indonesia
- Agency executives: Prabowo Subianto, Chairman; Sjafrie Sjamsoeddin, Executive Chief; Donny Ermawan Taufanto, Executive Secretary

The National Defense Council (Indonesian: Dewan Pertahanan Nasional) is an Indonesian national defense council that advises and formulates solutions to establish policies for national defense, national integrity, and national safety.

== History ==
Prior to the formation of the National Defense Council, the Indonesian national defense council was the National Resilience Council which was dominated by the Indonesian National Police members and emphasized on national security.

== Funding ==
The National Defense Council is not financially independent despite being nominally chaired by the president. Instead, the council is funded by the Ministry of Defense fund.

== Council Members ==
The members of the council are:

No.	Position	Name
1	President of Indonesia (as Chairman)	Prabowo Subianto
2	Minister of Defense (as Executive Chief)	Sjafrie Sjamsoeddin
3	Deputy Minister of Defense (as Executive Secretary)	Donny Ermawan Taufanto
Permanent Member
4	Vice President of Indonesia	Gibran Rakabuming Raka
5	Ministry of Foreign Affairs	Sugiono
6	Ministry of Home Affairs	Tito Karnavian
7	Commander of the Indonesian National Armed Forces	Agus Subiyanto
8	Minister of the State Secretariat	Prasetyo Hadi
9	Minister of Finance	Purbaya Yudhi Sadewa
10	Director of State Intelligence Agency	Muhammad Herindra
11	Chief of Staff of the Indonesian Army	Maruli Simanjuntak
12	Chief of Staff of the Indonesian Navy	Muhammad Ali
13	Chief of Staff of the Indonesian Air Forces	Mohamad Tony Harjono

== Organization ==
Based on Presidential Decree No. 202/2024 and as expanded with Ministry of Defense Decree No.6/2025, the National Defense Council is organized into the following:

- National Defense Council (headed by the President)
  - Expert Group for Defense Strategies and Industries
- Office of the Executive Director (headed by the Minister of Defense)
- Office of the Executive Secretary (headed by the Deputy Minister of Defense)
  - Chief Secretariat
    - Division of Planning and Performance Accountability
      - Sub-division of Planning
      - Sub-division of Performance Accountability
    - Division of Meetings
      - Sub-division of Meetings Facilitation
      - Sub-division of Proceedings
    - Division of Partnerships, Data, and Information
      - Sub-division of Partnerships and Legal Affairs
      - Sub-division of Data and Information
    - Division of General Affairs
      - Sub-division of Household Affairs
      - Sub-division of Administration and Protocols
    - Expert Group for Secretive Information and Technology
  - Deputy for Geostrategy
    - Experts Groups in Geostrategy
  - Deputy for Geopolitics
    - Experts Groups in Geopolitics
  - Deputy for Geoeconomics
    - Experts Groups in Geoeconomics

=== Professional Staffs ===
Not including the general staffs that working in the council' daily administration, The Professional Staffs (Tenaga Profesional) are the council staffs that providing advises to the president as Chairman of the National Defense Council (for the experts in the Expert Group for Defense Strategies and Industries) or performing research and analysis for the council (for the experts under the respective deputy). By Presidential Decree No. 202/2024, the professional staffs can be sourced from government employees or soldiers. The professional staffs consist of:

- Expert Group for Defense Strategies and Industries (Kelompok Pakar Strategis dan Industri Pertahanan, Disetarakan Eselon I.a), maximum 7 within the council
- Senior Advisors, Equivalent to Echelon I.b (Tenaga Ahli Utama, Disetarakan Eselon I.b)
- Advisors, Equivalent to Echelon II.a (Tenaga Ahli Madya, Disetarakan Eselon II.a)
- Assistant Advisors, Equivalent to Echelon III.a (Tenaga Ahli Muda, Disetarakan Eselon III.a)
- Junior Advisors, Equivalent to Echelon III.a (Tenaga Terampil, Disetarakan Eselon III.a)
