= Budi Gunawan =

Indonesian police general and intelligence official (born 1959)

Tan Sri Budi Gunawan PSM
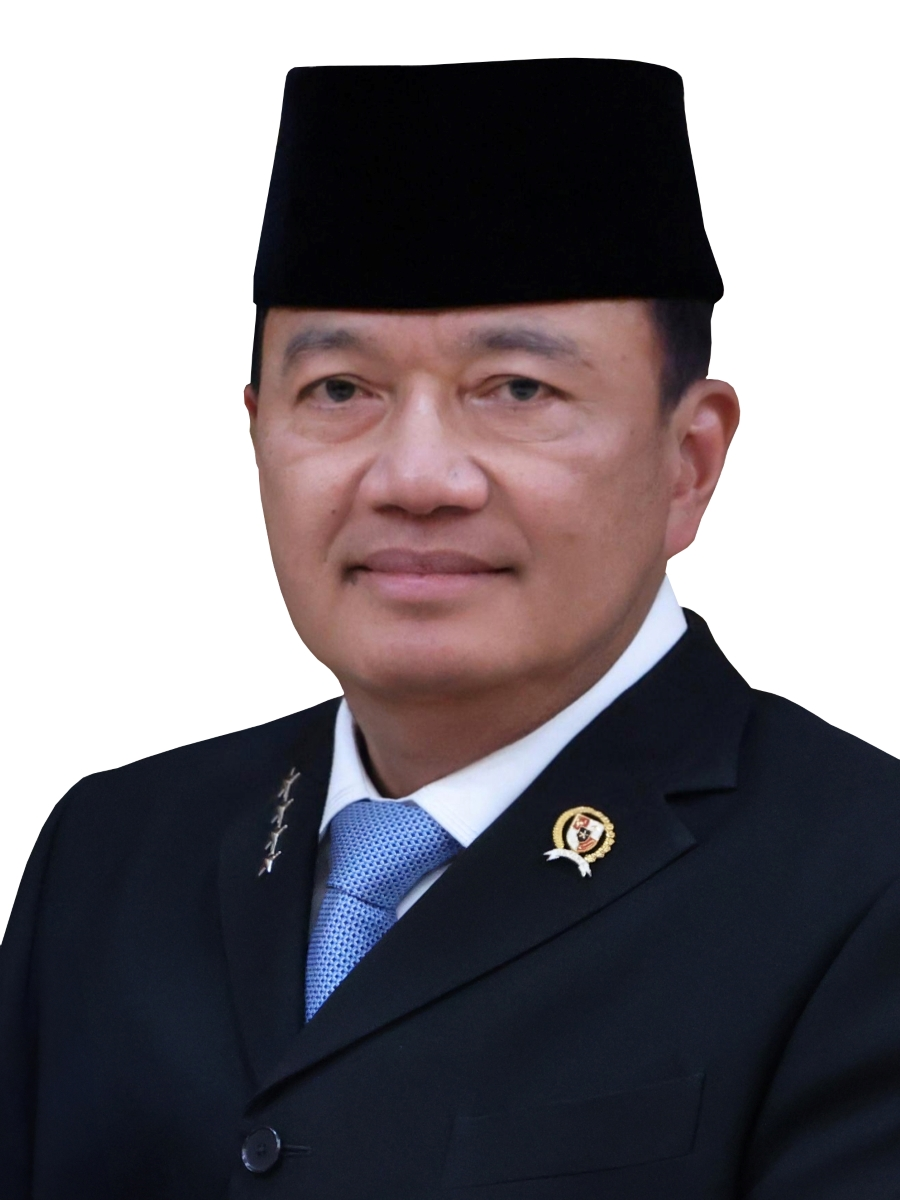
- Official portrait, 2024

Member of the Presidential Advisory Council
- Incumbent
- Assumed office 2 October 2026
- President: Prabowo Subianto
- Chairman: Pratikno

16th Coordinating Ministry for Political and Security Affairs
- In office 21 October 2024 – 8 September 2025
- President: Prabowo Subianto
- Deputy: Lodewijk Freidrich Paulus
- Preceded by: Hadi Tjahjanto
- Succeeded by: Sjafrie Sjamsoeddin (acting); Djamari Chaniago

17th Director of the State Intelligence Agency
- In office 9 September 2016 – 21 October 2024
- President: Joko Widodo; Prabowo Subianto
- Deputy: Torry Djohar Banguntoro (2016–2017); Teddy Lhaksmana (2017–2023); I Nyoman Cantiasa (2023–2024)
- Preceded by: Sutiyoso
- Succeeded by: Muhammad Herindra

General Chairman of the Indonesian Esports Executive Board
- In office 18 January 2020 – 15 September 2026
- Preceded by: Position established
- Succeeded by: Muhammad Herindra
Police positions
Deputy Chief of the Indonesian National Police
In office 22 April 2015 – 9 September 2016
President	Joko Widodo
Chief of Police	Badrodin Haiti (2015–2016); Tito Karnavian (2016)
Preceded by	Badrodin Haiti
Succeeded by	Syafruddin Kambo
Head of the National Police Education Institute
In office 26 December 2012 – 22 April 2015
Preceded by	Pol. Comr. Gen. Oegroseno
Succeeded by	Pol. Comr. Gen. Syafruddin Kambo
Chief of the Bali Regional Police
In office 6 March 2012 – 26 December 2012
Preceded by	Pol. Insp. Gen. Totoy Herawan Indra
Succeeded by	Pol. Insp. Gen. Arif Wachyunadi
Chief of the Jambi Regional Police
In office 14 January 2008 – 31 October 2009
Preceded by	Pol. Brig. Gen. Carel Risakotta
Succeeded by	Pol. Brig. Gen. R. Sulistyono

Personal details
- Born: 11 December 1959 (age 66) Surakarta, Central Java, Indonesia
- Spouse: Susilawati Rahayu
- Children: 3, including Mochamad Herviano
- Education: Indonesian Police Academy (1983); Trisakti University

Military service
- Allegiance: Indonesia
- Branch/service: Indonesian National Police; State Intelligence Agency
- Years of service: 1983–2018
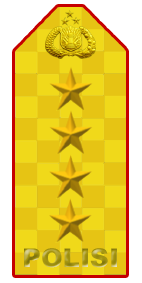
- Rank: Police General
- Unit: Intelligence

Budi Gunawan (born 11 December 1959) is a retired Indonesian police general and intelligence official who has served as a member of the Presidential Advisory Council (Wantimpres) since 2 October 2026. He previously served as Coordinating Minister for Political and Security Affairs (Menko Polkam) from 21 October 2024 until his dismissal on 8 September 2025.

Before leading the Coordinating Ministry, Gunawan headed the State Intelligence Agency (BIN) from 9 September 2016 to 21 October 2024. He was the second police officer, after Sutanto, to lead BIN, and the first police officer to lead the Coordinating Ministry for Political and Security Affairs. Outside government, he was the inaugural general chairman of the Indonesian Esports Executive Board (PB ESI) from 18 January 2020 to 15 September 2026.

== Early life and education ==
Gunawan was born in Surakarta, Central Java, on 11 December 1959. He graduated from the Indonesian Police Academy in 1983. Over the course of his career, he continued his studies and eventually earned a doctorate in law from Trisakti University.

On 8 August 2018, Gunawan was inaugurated as a professor of intelligence studies at the State Intelligence College (STIN), with a focus on cyber issues, coinciding with STIN's 15th anniversary and graduation ceremony. STIN's chairman at the time, Rodon Pedrason, stated that although Gunawan did not come from an academic background, he was considered eligible because he taught at STIN and several universities and had received 22 letters of support from professors and universities in Indonesia and abroad.

== Police career ==
Gunawan began his career in the Indonesian National Police after graduating from the Police Academy in 1983. He held several field posts, including chief of the Tanjung Karang Barat Sector Police and chief of the Bogor District Police. Between 1999 and 2004, he served as an aide-de-camp, first to the Vice President and later to President Megawati Sukarnoputri.

After his tenure as aide-de-camp ended, he served as Head of the Career Development Bureau of the National Police Human Resources Staff (2004–2006), and then as Head of the Advanced Officers' School of the National Police Education Institute (2006–2008). He was installed as Chief of the Jambi Regional Police on 14 January 2008. He went on to serve as Head of the National Police Legal Affairs Division (2009–2010) and Head of the National Police Division of Profession and Security (2010–2012).

On 6 March 2012, he was installed as Chief of the Bali Regional Police, and on 26 December 2012 he was appointed Head of the National Police Education Institute with the rank of Police Commissioner General.

=== Nomination as Chief of Police ===
In early January 2015, President Joko Widodo submitted Gunawan to the House of Representatives (DPR) as the sole candidate for Chief of the Indonesian National Police. On 13 January 2015, the Corruption Eradication Commission (KPK) named him a suspect in an alleged corruption case involving suspicious transactions believed to have taken place while he was Head of the Career Development Bureau. KPK chairman Abraham Samad stated that the investigation had been underway since July 2014.

The suspect designation sparked tensions between the KPK and the National Police. Gunawan filed a pretrial motion, and in February 2015 the South Jakarta District Court, in ruling No. 04/Pid.Prap/2015/PN.Jkt.Sel, declared the designation invalid. The ruling became one of the most widely discussed pretrial decisions among legal scholars.

Following the controversy, President Joko Widodo cancelled Gunawan's installation as Chief of Police and appointed Badrodin Haiti instead. The KPK subsequently transferred the case to the Attorney General's Office and then to the National Police Criminal Investigation Agency, where it was eventually dropped for lack of sufficient evidence.

=== Deputy Chief of Police ===
Although his nomination as Chief of Police was cancelled, Gunawan had already passed the DPR's fit and proper test. He was installed as Deputy Chief of the Indonesian National Police on 22 April 2015, serving under Chief of Police Badrodin Haiti and later Tito Karnavian until 9 September 2016.

== Head of the State Intelligence Agency ==
Gunawan's inauguration as Head of BIN

Gunawan was installed as Head of the State Intelligence Agency on 9 September 2016, succeeding Sutiyoso, and served until 21 October 2024. During his tenure, BIN's organizational structure was expanded several times, and the agency ran a range of programs outside the scope of conventional intelligence work.

=== Establishment of the Deputy for Cyber Intelligence ===
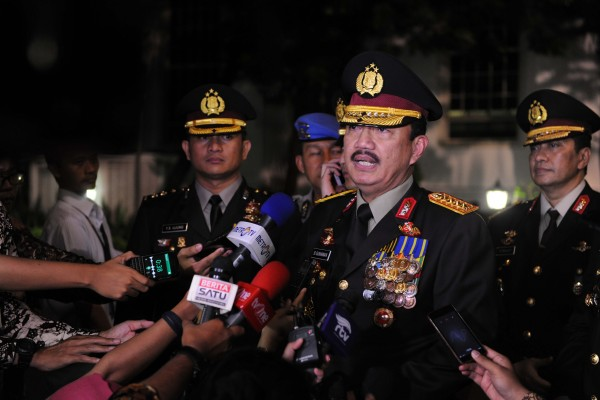
Gunawan answering reporters' questions after his inauguration as Head of BIN at the Presidential Palace complex, Jakarta, on 9 September 2016.

On 21 July 2017, President Joko Widodo signed Presidential Regulation No. 73 of 2017, amending Presidential Regulation No. 90 of 2012 on the State Intelligence Agency. The regulation created a new deputyship, the Deputy for Cyber Intelligence (Deputy VI). Under Article 25A, this deputy carries out part of BIN's duties and functions in the field of cyber intelligence. The regulation was promulgated on 24 July 2017.

=== 2019 reconciliation of Joko Widodo and Prabowo Subianto ===
Following the 2019 presidential election, which was marked by riots on 21 and 22 May 2019 and a dispute over the results at the Constitutional Court, President Joko Widodo and Prabowo Subianto met on 13 July 2019. The two rode the MRT from Lebak Bulus Station to Istora Mandiri Station, then continued their meeting over lunch in the Senayan area. Gunawan, then Head of BIN, accompanied them throughout.

Several officials described Gunawan as one of the intermediaries who brought the two together. Cabinet Secretary Pramono Anung said that Gunawan had worked out of the public eye to make the meeting happen. Transportation Minister Budi Karya Sumadi named three people who had bridged the meeting: Pramono Anung, Gunawan, and Gerindra Party deputy chairman Edhy Prabowo. Sandiaga Uno, Prabowo's running mate in that election, also acknowledged Gunawan's role in bringing about the meeting.

A few weeks later, Gunawan was also credited with a role in the meeting between PDI-P chairwoman Megawati Sukarnoputri and Prabowo Subianto.

=== Role in the COVID-19 response ===
During the COVID-19 pandemic, Gunawan instructed BIN personnel to help the government break the chain of transmission. BIN conducted mass swab testing in various parts of Indonesia using mobile laboratories. In mid-2021, BIN ran simultaneous door-to-door vaccination drives in 14 provinces and targeted specific groups such as students aged 12 to 17 and pesantren students.

The door-to-door method drew positive responses from several quarters. Ardiansyah Bahar, executive director of the Health Development Study and Consultation Institute, considered it potentially effective in accelerating national vaccination coverage if implemented widely and in coordination with regional governments, while DPR member Bobby Adityo Rizaldi pointed to limited resources as its main obstacle.

=== Establishment of the Deputy for Apparatus Security Intelligence ===
On 20 July 2020, President Joko Widodo signed Presidential Regulation No. 79 of 2020, the second amendment to Presidential Regulation No. 90 of 2012. The regulation created the Deputy for Apparatus Security Intelligence (Deputy VIII), tasked with formulating policy and conducting intelligence activities and/or operations to secure the state apparatus. This raised the number of deputyships at BIN from eight to nine. Several observers considered that the new deputyship gave BIN a role in overseeing government personnel.

=== "Rajawali" special team controversy ===
In September 2020, a public controversy arose after a video circulated showing personnel armed with long-barreled weapons, called "Rajawali", performing at a ceremony marking STIN's change of statute in Sentul, Bogor, on 9 September 2020, in the presence of Gunawan and several state officials. Through its Deputy VII, Wawan Hari Purwanto, BIN explained that "Rajawali" was not a separate force or unit but a code name for the Special Intelligence Training program for BIN personnel. Military analyst Khairul Fahmi of the Institute for Security and Strategic Studies (ISESS) said that BIN would need a legal basis if it wished to maintain an armed special force.

=== Nusantara Student Dormitory ===
BIN initiated the construction of the Nusantara Student Dormitory (Asrama Mahasiswa Nusantara, AMN) under Presidential Regulation No. 106 of 2021, with the aim of providing shared housing for university students of different ethnicities, languages, cultures, and religions. According to Gunawan, the program followed up on a directive from President Joko Widodo on 10 September 2019, when the President received 61 figures from Papua and West Papua at the State Palace who, among other issues, raised the problem of friction between students in the cities where they studied. Dormitories were planned for six cities: Surabaya, Makassar, Manado, Malang, Bantul, and Jakarta.

President Joko Widodo with BIN Head Budi Gunawan, Defense Minister Prabowo, Education Minister Nadiem, Religious Affairs Minister Yaqut, Marine Affairs and Fisheries Minister Sakti, and Cabinet Secretary Pramono inaugurating AMN Surabaya on 29 November 2022.

The first dormitory was built by the Ministry of Public Works and Public Housing in Siwalankerto, Surabaya, beginning on 17 September 2021, and was completed on 31 May 2022. President Joko Widodo inaugurated it on 29 November 2022 and at the same time launched the construction of similar dormitories in Makassar and Manado. AMN Surabaya houses 410 students from across the country who study at UPN "Veteran" East Java, Surabaya State University, Airlangga University, and the Sepuluh Nopember Institute of Technology, and is equipped with communal spaces, a library, a language laboratory, a health clinic, a counseling room, and sports fields.

In his remarks, President Joko Widodo expressed his appreciation to BIN, which he described as a catalyst for building AMN dormitories in several cities. Gunawan expressed the hope that the dormitory would become one of the places where the nation's future leaders are formed, and explained that the residents' development program covered national awareness, national defense, entrepreneurship, leadership, sports, the arts, religion, and community service.

=== Development of STIN and medical intelligence ===
On 30 May 2022, BIN inaugurated the "Dr. (HC) Ir. Soekarno" smart campus at STIN in Sentul, Bogor. According to Gunawan, the development was part of a goal to make STIN one of Asia's leading intelligence colleges by 2035. On the same occasion, the "Wangsa Avatara" Medical Intelligence Building was also inaugurated, with former President Megawati Sukarnoputri presiding over the ceremony. According to BIN, the facility is equipped with a Biosafety Level 3 laboratory and next-generation sequencing technology, and is intended to anticipate biological threats as well as nuclear, biological, and chemical threats.

STIN also opened several new undergraduate programs, including Intelligence Agent, Intelligence Technology, Cyber Intelligence, and Intelligence Economics, as well as master's and doctoral programs in Medical Intelligence, Technology and Cyber, Economic Intelligence, Intelligence Studies, and Intelligence Strategy Analysis. The Medical Intelligence program was reportedly established in response to the experience of dealing with the COVID-19 pandemic.

=== Papua Youth Creative Hub ===
On 21 March 2023, President Joko Widodo inaugurated the Papua Youth Creative Hub (PYCH) building in Abepura District, Jayapura, which was initiated by BIN and built by the Ministry of Public Works and Public Housing. Gunawan became the institution's patron. Like AMN, PYCH followed up on the President's meeting with a group of young Papuans at the State Palace in September 2019. The facility hosts activities in animal husbandry, fisheries, fashion, music, photography, and app development.

In a press statement after the inauguration, President Joko Widodo ordered that similar facilities be built in East Nusa Tenggara, Maluku, and Aceh, tailored to the needs of young people in each province. Papua's acting governor, Muhammad Ridwan Rumasukun, described PYCH as an investment by the central government in developing young Papuan talent. Papuan youth figure Charles Toto argued that PYCH could serve as a platform for turning the local potential of young Papuans into micro, small, and medium enterprise (MSME) products.

=== Amanah Youth Creative Hub ===
On 15 October 2024, President Joko Widodo inaugurated the Aneuk Muda Aceh Unggul Hebat (Amanah) building in Ladong, Aceh Besar Regency, which was also initiated by BIN. According to Gunawan, Amanah has 20,256 young Acehnese members and focuses on seven priority sectors: agriculture and plantations, animal husbandry, fisheries, MSMEs, sports, the environment and education, and the creative economy. In his remarks, the President expressed appreciation for BIN's initiative and said he hoped similar creative hubs would be built in every province.

== Coordinating Minister for Political and Security Affairs ==
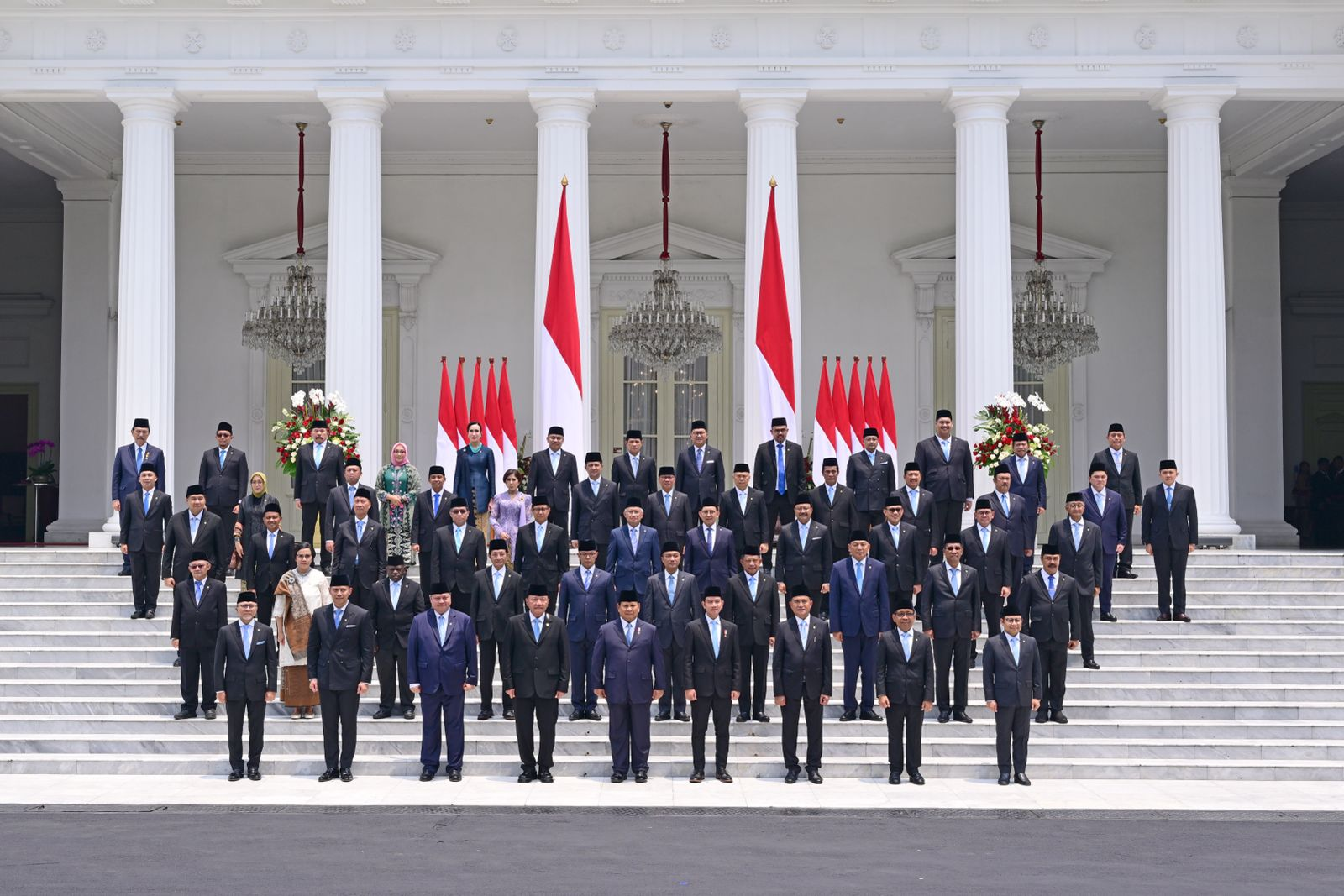
Gunawan with members of the Red and White Cabinet after their inauguration at the Merdeka Palace on 21 October 2024.

Gunawan was installed as Coordinating Minister for Political and Security Affairs in the Red and White Cabinet by President Prabowo Subianto on 21 October 2024, succeeding Hadi Tjahjanto. He was the first police officer to hold the post. His deputy coordinating minister was Lodewijk Freidrich Paulus.

=== Establishment of coordination desks ===
On 4 November 2024, at a ministerial-level coordination meeting, the Coordinating Ministry established seven inter-ministerial and inter-agency desks to accelerate priority programs in the first 100 days of President Prabowo Subianto's administration, with an initial working period of three months. The seven desks were the Regional Elections Desk, led by the Minister of Home Affairs; the Smuggling Prevention Desk, led by the Coordinating Ministry; the Narcotics Eradication Desk and the Online Gambling Desk, both led by the Chief of Police; the Coordination Desk for Increasing State Foreign Exchange Revenue and the Desk for Corruption Prevention and Governance Improvement, both led by the Attorney General; and the Cyber Security and Data Protection Desk, led by the communication and digital ministry together with the National Cyber and Crypto Agency.

On 13 March 2025, the Coordinating Ministry established two more desks: the Coordination Desk for Forest and Land Fire Management, led by the Head of the National Agency for Disaster Countermeasure, and the Coordination Desk for the Protection of Indonesian Migrant Workers and Human Trafficking, led by the Minister of Protection of Indonesian Migrant Workers. After Gunawan left office, his successor Djamari Chaniago reviewed the enforcement desks established during his tenure.

=== Dismissal ===
On 8 September 2025, President Prabowo Subianto dismissed Gunawan as Coordinating Minister through Presidential Decree No. 86P of 2025 on the Dismissal and Appointment of Ministers and Deputy Ministers of the Red and White Cabinet for the 2024–2029 period. In the same decree, the President also dismissed Ario Bimo Nandito Ariotedjo as Minister of Youth and Sports. The ceremony was held at the State Palace; Gunawan did not attend.

The dismissal came shortly after a series of protests and riots in late August 2025, which were triggered by the issue of allowances for DPR members and escalated after online motorcycle taxi driver Affan Kurniawan was run over and killed by a Brimob tactical vehicle on 28 August 2025. Minister of State Secretary and presidential spokesperson Prasetyo Hadi denied that the dismissal was related to the riots, saying the President's decision was based on a comprehensive evaluation. He added that the President had not yet named a permanent replacement, so the post would be filled on an interim basis. Defense Minister Sjafrie Sjamsoeddin was appointed acting Coordinating Minister on 9 September 2025, before the post was permanently filled by Djamari Chaniago.

== Esports Indonesia ==
PB ESI general chairman Budi Gunawan delivering a briefing at the PB ESI National Coordination Meeting on 5 March 2022.

Gunawan was elected as the first general chairman of the Indonesian Esports Executive Board on 18 January 2020 for the 2020–2024 term. At its National Working Meeting, held from 25 to 27 August 2020, the National Sports Committee of Indonesia (KONI) recognized esports as a competitive sport and designated PB ESI as the sole official body representing Indonesia.

At the 2021 SEA Games, held in May 2022 in Vietnam, Indonesia's esports contingent won six medals (two gold, three silver, and one bronze) and finished second behind the host nation. In December 2022, Indonesia hosted the IESF 14th World Esports Championship in Nusa Dua, Bali, which drew 105 countries, and finished as overall champion with three gold medals and one bronze. Esports was contested as an official sport for the first time at the 21st National Sports Week in Aceh and North Sumatra in 2024.

== Personal life ==
Gunawan is married to Susilawati Rahayu, and they have three children, one of whom is the politician Mochamad Herviano. He has written several books, including Koloni Keadilan (Colony of Justice), Terorisme: Mitos & Konspirasi (Terrorism: Myths and Conspiracies), Membangun Kompetensi Polri (Building the Competence of the National Police), Kebohongan di Dunia Maya (Lies in Cyberspace), Demokrasi di Era Post Truth (Democracy in the Post-Truth Era), MEDSOS di Antara Dua Kutub (Social Media Between Two Poles), Kuasa Siber: Sebuah Refleksi Kritis (Cyber Power: A Critical Reflection), and Membentuk Manusia Perang Pikiran (Shaping Humans for the War of Minds).

== Honors ==

Row 1	Star of Mahaputera, 2nd Class (Adipradana) (2020)	Star of Bhayangkara, 1st Class (Utama) (2018)	Star of Bhayangkara, 2nd Class (Pratama)	Star of Bhayangkara, 3rd Class (Nararya)
Row 2	Commander of the Order of Loyalty to the Crown of Malaysia (P.S.M.), Malaysia (2020)	Satyalancana Pengabdian (32 years of service)	Satyalancana Pengabdian (24 years of service)	Satyalancana Pengabdian (16 years of service)
Row 3	Satyalancana Pengabdian (8 years of service)	Satyalancana Jana Utama (repeat award)	Satyalancana Ksatria Bhayangkara	Satyalancana Karya Bhakti (repeat award)
Row 4	Satyalancana Dwidya Sistha	Satyalancana Bhakti Pendidikan	Satyalancana Bhakti Buana	Satyalancana Bhakti Nusa
Row 5	Satyalancana Dharma Nusa	Satyalancana Bhakti Purna	Satyalancana Operasi Kepolisian	Satyalancana G.O.M VII
Row 6	Satyalancana G.O.M IX	Satyalancana Wira Siaga	Satyalancana Kebhaktian Sosial	Satyalancana Wira Karya
