= On the Art of Military Leadership =

On the Art of Military Leadership (original Indonesian title: Kepemimpinan Militer "Military Leadership") is a two-volume work by Prabowo Subianto, now the Indonesian President. First published in Bahasa Indonesia in 2021/2022, it was released in a Russian translation with the title Ob iskusstve voennogo liderstva (Об искусстве военного лидерства "On the Art of Military Leadership") in 2025 to coincide with Subianto's state visit to the St. Petersburg International Economic Forum. President Subianto was formerly defence minister and he is to some extent a theorist of armed conflicts and armed confrontations. The book combines autobiographical writing, military theory, and cultural-political commentary.

President Prabowo Subianto 2024 official portrait

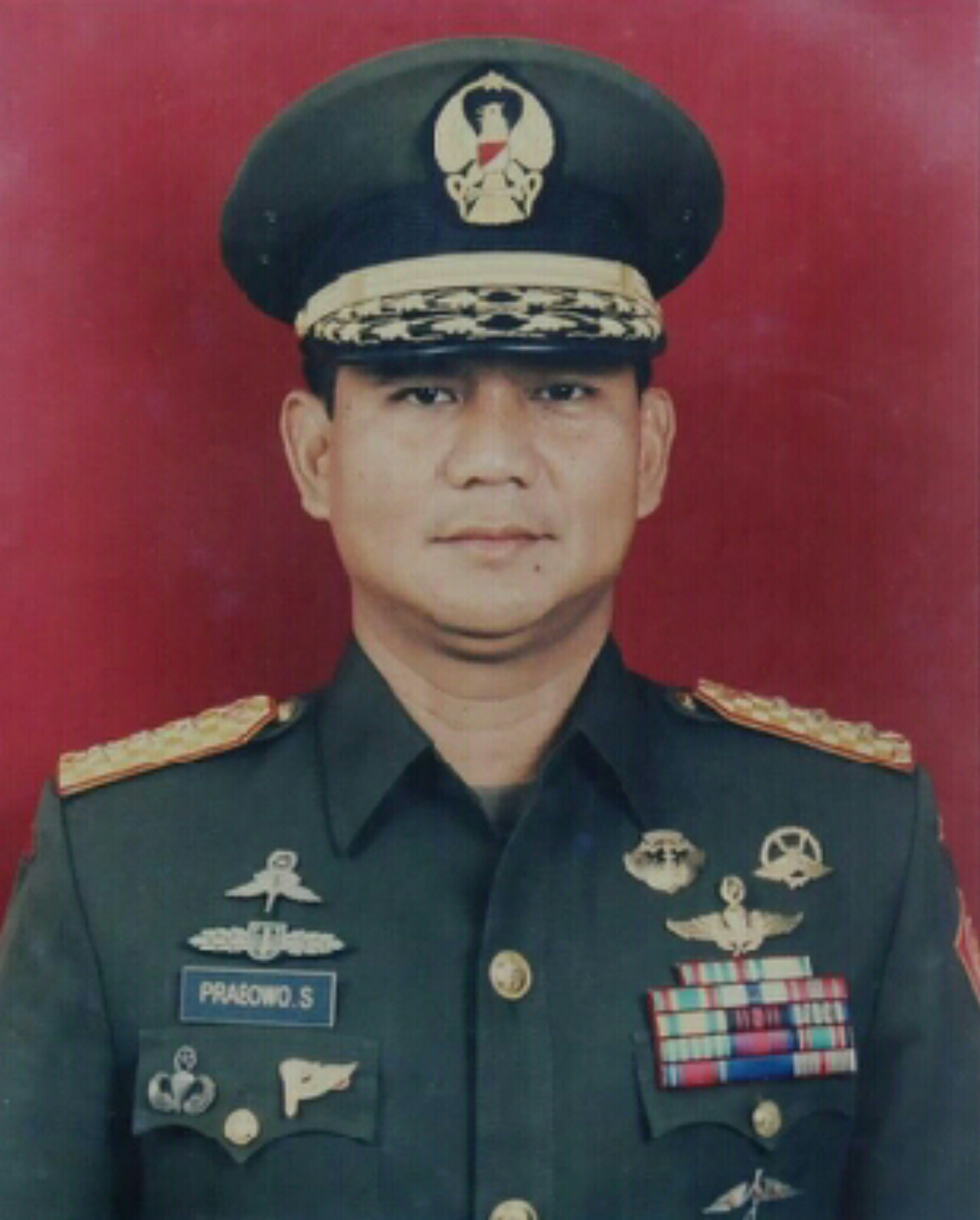
Indonesian National Army lieutenant general Prabowo Subianto while serving as Commander of the Army Command and Staff College National Indonesia (1998)

== Content ==
Written during Subianto’s term as Minister of Defense, the work is structured in two volumes. The first volume presents portraits of influential military figures and formative personalities who inspired Subianto during his career—comrades, superiors, and Indonesian national heroes such as Kertanegara, Gajah Mada, Prince Diponegoro, Sukarno, and General Sudirman. Subianto recounts his own military experiences, from his early days as a lieutenant to leading special forces units and eventually serving as defense minister. The chapters also reveal lesser-known episodes from Indonesian military history.

The second volume offers a comparative analysis of prominent leaders across different eras and cultures, including Julius Caesar, Alexander the Great, Sunzi, Salahuddin al-Ayyubi, Genghis Khan, Toyotomi Hideyoshi, Simón Bolívar, Zhu De, Emiliano Zapata, Võ Nguyên Giáp, George Washington, Nelson Mandela, and Russian and Soviet commanders such as Mikhail Kutuzov, Georgy Zhukov, and Konstantin Rokossovsky. Subianto examines leadership principles, character traits, and moral attitudes that, in his view, legitimize military authority. The book also reflects on flawed and destructive models of leadership.

About the Chinese military strategist Marshal Zhu De (1886–1976) it was said, for example (in English translation):

What I admire most about Zhu is his contribution to guerrilla warfare theory. Although Mao often receives more praise for this, it was actually Zhu who had the military education and experience needed to conduct guerrilla warfare. It was this background that Zhu used to lead the CCP’s unconventional war. The strategy implemented by Zhu inspired and was followed by dozens of guerrilla movements from the second half of the 20th century to the present.

== Themes and Style ==
Subianto blends personal anecdotes with reflections on virtues such as discipline, self-sacrifice, and loyalty. Local proverbs—such as “Work hard, do not seek excessive profit; the welfare of the people and the nation stands above all”—serve as ethical touchstones throughout the text. The book is aimed at junior officers, military professionals, historians, and the general public.

== Publication history ==
The original Indonesian edition was published by PT Media Pandu Bangsa in 2021 and 2022. The Russian translation, overseen by the Institute of Oriental Studies of the Russian Academy of Sciences, was released in 2025 with support from a former Russian ambassador to Jakarta. Its publication coincided with Prabowo Subianto’s state visit to Russia, marking a gesture of strategic partnership and cultural diplomacy.

== Significance ==
On the Art of Military Leadership is more than a treatise on military doctrine. It serves as a political and ideological statement by a former general and current head of state, articulating themes of national identity, historical continuity, and Indonesia’s geopolitical positioning in the 21st century.

On June 19, 2025, a Russian-Indonesian high-level meeting in Saint Petersburg marked a significant event in the diplomatic relations of the two countries, which celebrated their 75th anniversary. For this the Institute of Oriental Studies of the Russian Academy of Sciences and the scientific-analytical portal “Eastern Tribune” (Восточная трибуна) have timed the publication in Russian of the memoirs.

In response to claims that Russia would be an unreliable ally because it did not stand up for Iran, the Russian president Vladimir Putin cited the work of Prabowo Subianto in a discussion with the words: «Каждая страна несёт собственную ответственность за то, что происходит у неё» ("Every country bears its own responsibility for what happens within it").

== Table of Contents ==
The chapters of the works are (in free English translation)

Volume I

I The model of the Indonesian National Army
II Leadership and command authority
III Components of leadership
IV Successful military leadership
V The behavior of a true military leader
VI The leadership qualities of my superiors
VII The leadership of non-commissioned officers who trained, shaped, and supported me
VIII Leadership of those who fought with me
IX Leadership of the national freedom fighters

Volume II

I The essence of military leadership
II Important notes from the book of military strategy
III Negative examples of leadership
IV Sometimes enemies deserve our respect
V The attitude of a winner
VI Notes for young leaders
VII The toughest task of a military leader
VIII The right leadership for Indonesia
Conclusion

== Bibliographic Information ==
- Prabowo Subianto (2021). Kepemimpinan Militer: Catatan dari Pengalaman. PT Media Pandu Bangsa. ISBN 9786025154133
- Prabowo Subianto (2022). Kepemimpinan Militer, Vol. 1. ISBN 9786025154188
- Prabowo Subianto (2022). Kepemimpinan Militer, Vol. 2. ISBN 9786025154195
- Ob iskusstve voennogo liderstva (Об искусстве военного лидерства). 2025, 2 volumes (Russian translation)
