= Bandjela Paliudju =

Indonesian politician (born 1945)

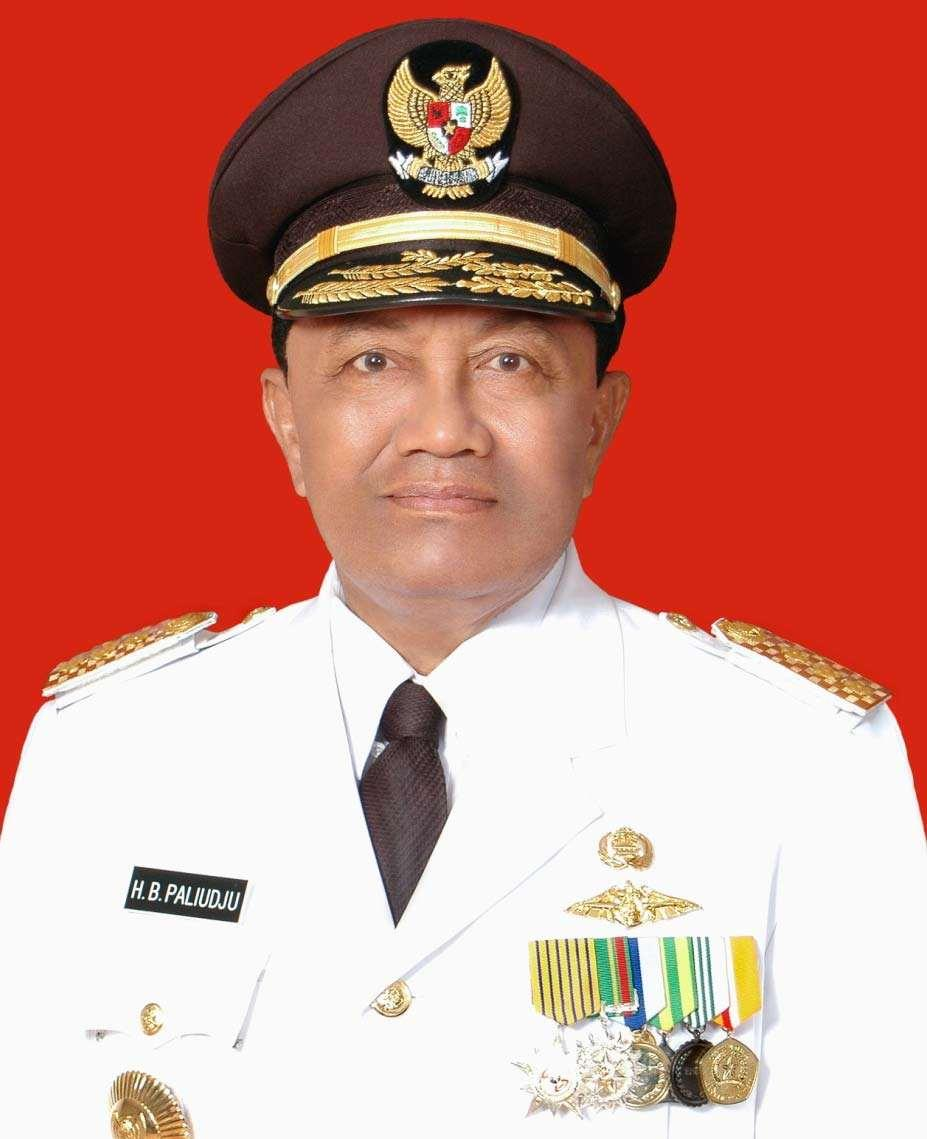

Governor of Central Sulawesi
- In office 24 March 2006 – 24 March 2011
- President: Susilo Bambang Yudhoyono
- Deputy: Achmad Yahya
- Preceded by: Aminuddin Ponulele; Gumyadi (acting)
- Succeeded by: Rais Lamangkona (acting); Tanribali Lamo (acting); Longki Djanggola
- In office 16 February 1996 – 16 February 2001
- President: Suharto; B. J. Habibie; Abdurrahman Wahid
- Deputy: Kiesman Abdullah
- Preceded by: Abdul Aziz Lamadjido
- Succeeded by: Aminuddin Ponulele

Regent of Donggala
- In office 8 March 1989 – 8 March 1994
- Governor: Abdul Aziz Lamadjido
- Preceded by: Ramli Noor
- Succeeded by: Syachbuddin Labadjo

Personal details
- Born: March 3, 1945 (age 81) Palu, Japanese Dutch East Indies
- Party: Independent
- Other political affiliations: Golkar (until 1999); Indonesian Justice and Unity Party (1999–2013); NasDem Party (2013–2014)

Military service
- Allegiance: Indonesia
- Branch/service: Army
- Years of service: 1965–1998
- Rank: Brigadier general Major general (honorary)
- Unit: Infantry
- Commands: Luwuk Banggai Military District

Bandjela Paliudju (born 3 March 1945) is an Indonesian military officer and politician who served as the governor of Central Sulawesi from 1996 until 2001 and 2006 until 2011.

== Early life ==
Paliudju was born on 3 March 1945 in Pengavu Village, a small village located in the Donggala Regency (now reorganized into Palu), as the son of a farmer. He began his education at a local People's School in his village and finished in 1958. He then moved to Palu, the capital city, and attended junior high school and high school in the city until 1964. Due to his parents' inability to pay his tuition, Paliudju had to work as a coachman.

== Military career ==
Paliudju moved to Bandung shortly after he finished his high school education. He entered the Officer Candidate School and graduated in 1965 with the rank of warrant officer. He was deployed shortly to Central Kalimantan and briefly pursued university education at the University of Palangka Raya.

After serving several military posts, Paliudju was commissioned as the Head of Intelligence Section in the Tadulako Military Resort with the rank of captain. Shortly afterward, he was appointed as the chief of staff of the Donggala Military District with the rank of major and the commander of the Luwuk Banggai Military District with the rank of lieutenant colonel. His position as commander was his peak career in the military, as in 1989 he was already nominated as a candidate for the Regent of Donggala.

During his non-military tenure, Paliudju's rank was promoted several times. He was promoted to the rank of colonel while he was the Regent of Donggala and to brigadier general on 1 April 1995 while he was the chairman of the Central Sulawesi's branch of Golkar. His promotion to brigadier general earned him the nickname of "Kaili General" (Jenderal Kaili) from South Sulawesi Governor Zainal Basri Palaguna.

Paliudju retired from military service while he was serving his first governor term. He was given a post-retirement honorary promotion to major general on 16 February 1998.

== Regent of Donggala ==
Paliudju was sworn in as the Regent of Donggala on 8 March 1989, replacing Ramli Noor. One of his first actions as regent was rotating fourteen heads of subdistrict from their positions in August 1989.

== First governorship ==
=== Election ===
Before he was nominated as governor, Paliudju was one of the two candidates for the vice governor post, with his opponent being the Commander of the Tadulako Military Resort, Colonel Haryono. When the two names were forwarded to the Ministry of Home Affairs in January 1995, the ministry approved Haryono as the vice governor and Paliudju failed to become the vice governor.

Paliudju's name was then nominated by various parties for the Governor of Central Sulawesi. Out of the 805 letters that provided recommendations to Central Sulawesi's parliament regarding gubernatorial candidates, Paliudju was recommended by 367 letters. He was then named as a candidate for the post alongside four other candidates. Only three candidates were later approved to run in the gubernatorial election by the Ministry of Home Affairs.

Paliudju won the parliamentary gubernatorial election held on 24 January 1996 with 32 out of the 44 votes from the MPs that participated in the election. His opponents Abdul Azis Tandju and Kiesman Abdullah obtained seven and five votes each. He was sworn in as the governor of Central Sulawesi on 16 February 1996.

=== Re-election attempt ===
As 2001 became Paliudju's last year in his first five-year term, a gubernatorial election in Central Sulawesi was held. Paliudju decided to seek re-election and was nominated by the Armed Forces group in the parliament. He picked his incumbent vice governor, Kiesman Abdullah, as his running mate. Meanwhile, his opposition, Central Sulawesi parliament speaker Aminuddin Ponulele and Mayor of Palu Rully Azis Lamadjido, was nominated by the Golkar party.

During the preparations to hold the election, there were rumors of vote bribings by one of the gubernatorial candidates to the MPs who would elect the governors. Member of Parliament Nawawi S. Kilat proposed in an electoral meeting to conduct the election with an open ballot. After a bitter debate with other members, Ponulele, who acted as the parliament speaker, refused to accept Kilat's proposal and decided to hold the election with a secret ballot. The gubernatorial election, which was held on 16 January 2001, saw Paliudju's defeat against Ponulele. Paliudju obtained 11 votes, while Ponulele garnered a total of 34 votes.

=== Resignation and handover ===
Ponulele's swearing-in ceremony as the new governor was planned to take place on 16 February 2001. Several days before the ceremony, Ponulele was involved in an academic scandal, where he was accused of plagiarizing the scientific papers of Professor Surna Djajadiningrat, the director general of mining and energy. Ponulele was investigated by civil service investigators and then by the police. Minister of Home Affairs, who was initially planned to install Ponulele on 16 February, instructed the provincial government to delay the swearing in ceremony until the plagiarism case was resolved.

A day before Paliudju's first term ended, the Director General of Regional Government Autonomy sent a radiogram to him, instructing him to hand over his duties to Samijono, the regional secretary, who would act as the acting governor. Paliudju refused to comply with the radiogram, stating that the radiogram was a form of insult. He argued that the radiogram has no legal basis, since at the time of its creation the Director General of Regional Government Autonomy has been split into two different directorate generals. He recognized his vice governor, Kiesman Abdullah, as the acting governor instead. The dispute between Paliudju and the directorate general was resolved when Ponulele was sworn in on 21 February 2001.

== Second governorship ==
=== Election of 2006 ===
After failing to win in the 2001 election, Paliudju decided to run again in the province's 2006 gubernatorial election, which is the province's first ever direct gubernatorial election. Paliudju picked Achmad Yahya, the head of Palu's telecommunications bureau, as his running mate. The pair registered to the General Elections Commission in October 2005. The pair was declared as eligible to run in the elections by the commission several days later. Paliudju and Yahya were supported by the United People's Coalition, a coalition consisting of four political parties that held seats in the province's parliament, namely the Indonesian Justice and Unity Party, Crescent Star Party, National Mandate Party, and the National Awakening Party.

Elections were held on 16 January 2006. Immediate quick count results in afternoon favored Paliudju, before shifting in the evening to the Rully Lamajido and Sudarto pair, and to Paliudju again by night. A final vote count was held on 27 January and Paliudju was declared as the winner of the election with 411,113 votes, or 36 percent of the total votes. Paliudju was sworn in for the second time as governor on 24 March 2006.
