= Donny Ermawan Taufanto =

Indonesian air force officer (born 1965)

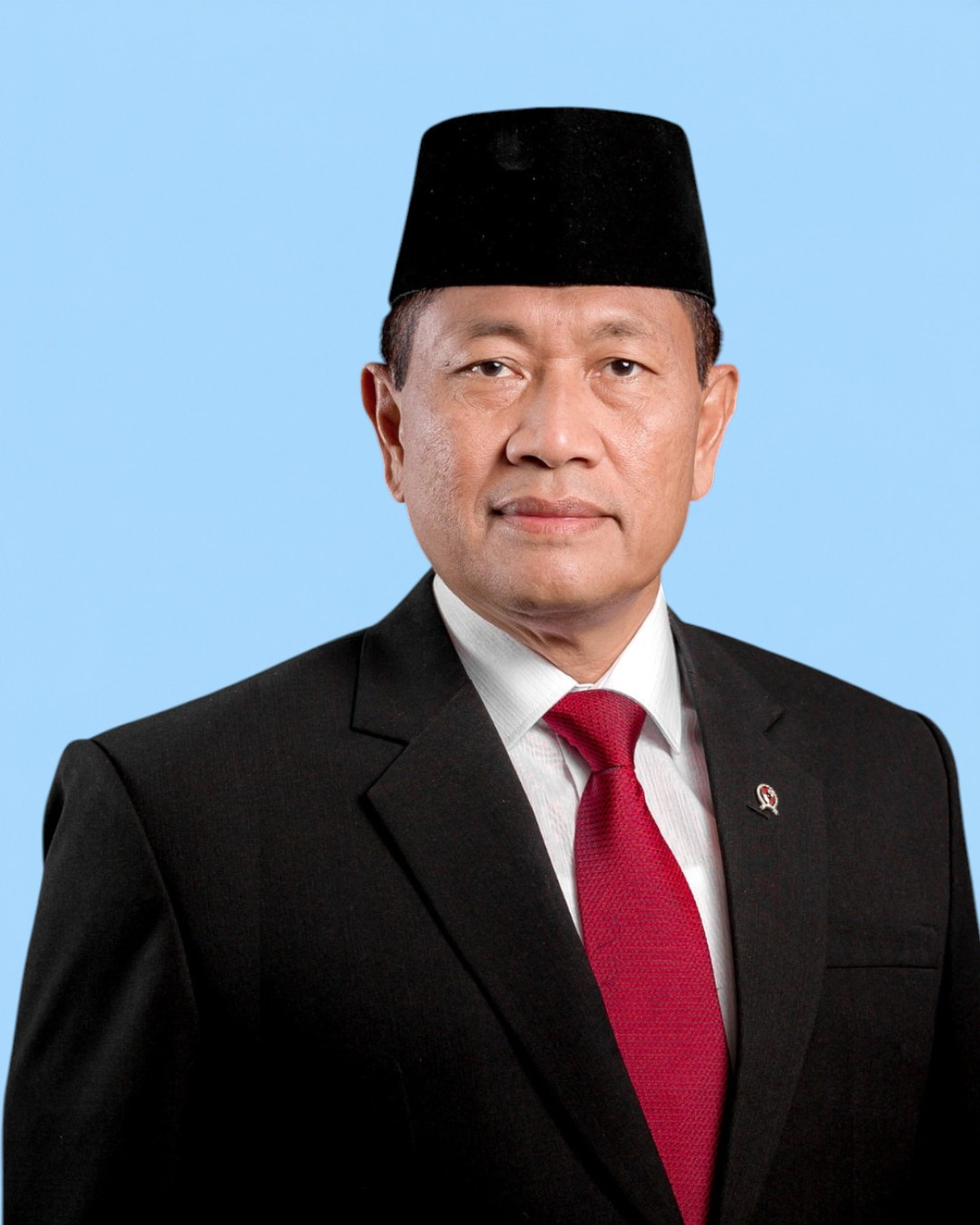
- Official portrait, 2025

Governor of the University of the Republic of Indonesia
- Incumbent
- Assumed office 22 July 2026
- Preceded by: office established

Vice Minister of Defense
- In office 21 October 2024 – 15 October 2026
- President: Prabowo Subianto
- Minister: Sjafrie Sjamsoeddin
- Preceded by: Muhammad Herindra
- Succeeded by: Richard Tampubolon; Yusuf Jauhari

Secretary-General of the Ministry of Defense
- In office 6 May 2020 – 14 November 2024
- Preceded by: Agus Setiadji
- Succeeded by: Tri Budi Utomo

Personal details
- Born: 12 December 1965 (age 60) Surakarta, Central Java
- Spouse: Siti Rahayu (m. 1996)
- Children: 1
- Education: Indonesian Air Force Academy; Gajayana University; Bandung Institute of Technology

Military service
- Allegiance: Indonesia
- Branch/service: Indonesian Air Force
- Years of service: 1988—2024
- Rank: Air chief marshal (honorary)

ACM (Hon.) (Ret.) Donny Ermawan Taufanto (born 12 December 1965) is an Indonesian air force officer who is currently serving the governor of the University of the Republic of Indonesia since 22 July 2026. He was previously the ministry's secretary general from 2020 until 2024, and vice minister of defense from 2024 to 2026.

== Early life and education ==
Donny was born in Surakarta on 12 December 1965. After completing high school at the Bandung State High School No. 4 in 1984, Donny entered the Indonesian Air Force Academy. He was commissioned as an air force second lieutenant upon graduating from the academy in 1988. He was a recipient of Adhi Makayasa, a distinction given to the best graduate of each class in the academy.

Donny holds a bachelor's degree in management from the Malang Gajayana University and a master's degree in development studies from the Bandung Institute of Technology. His thesis, titled National Defense Awareness of Coastal Communities in the Context of Economic Development in Natuna Regency as the Front Porch of the Republic of Indonesia, analyzes the economic development strategies for Natuna Regency.

== Career ==
Donny entered the air force flight school for about a year before beginning his career as a pilot. He finished his flight education in 1989 and was the best graduate of his class. He started his career as a pilot at the 15th Air Squadron, headquartered at the Iswahjudi Air Force Base. Donny later reached the rank of captain and became a member of the air force's Jupiter acrobatic flight team. As a pilot, he was given the callsign "Osprey".

Donny underwent further military studies at the air force command school in 1997 and the Australian Command and Staff College in 2003. He also attended the International Institute of Humanitarian Law in San Remo. He then assumed command of the 15th Air Squadron, and later as the chief of operations of the Iswahjudi Air Force Base.

Donny received his diplomatic assignment as military attache to Brazil in 2010. During his service, Donny received the Peacemaker Medal and the Santos-Dumont Merit Medal from the Brazilian government. He returned to Indonesia after about two years of service and attended the Armed Forces Command and General Staff College (Sesko TNI) in 2013. He received the Karya Wira Nugraha award for the best written work of his class.

Shortly after completing Sesko TNI, Donny was assigned to the air force personnel staff as assistant officers for planning affairs. On 21 March 2014, Donny was announced to be promoted as the commander of the Iswahjudi Air Force Base. He assumed the office on 16 April and was promoted to the rank of air commodore on 13 May.

A year after his appointment as the Iswahjudi Air Force Base commander, on 15 May 2015 he was transferred to the Second Air Force Operation Command in Makassar, South Sulawesi, as its chief of staff. He handed over his old office on 5 August 2015. After two years, on 9 June 2017 Donny was relieved from his chief of staff position.

Donny received a promotion to a two-star position as the deputy chief of the armed forces intelligence body. He briefly held this position from 9 June to 19 December 2017. He was officially promoted to the rank of air vice marshal on 24 July 2017. During his tenure, Donny attended a short course at the National Resilience Institute.

From 2017 to 2018, Donny was assigned to the air force headquarters as a special staff without portofolio. As vice-marshal, Donny served as Commander of the Air Force Staff and Command School from 7 May 2018 to 22 August 2019 and Commander of the Second Air Force Operation Command from 22 August 2019 to 29 May 2020.

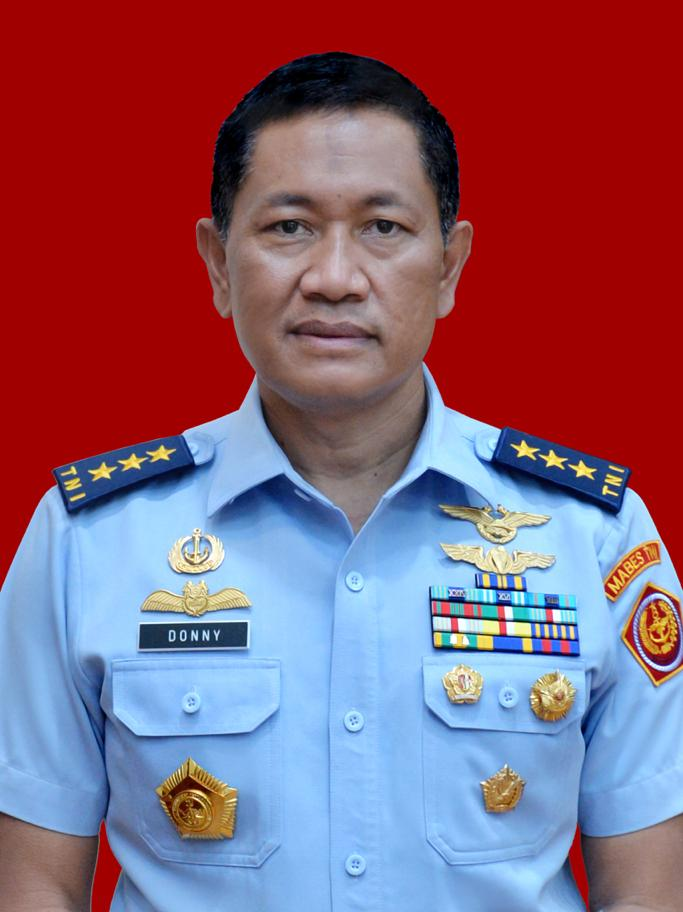
Donny Ermawan Taufanto as an air marshal.

On 6 May 2020, Donny received a promotion upon his appointment as the Secretary General of the Defense Ministry by minister Prabowo Subianto. He was promoted to the rank of air marshal fourteen days later. As the ministry's secretary general, Donny became the ex-officio president commissioner of the Dahana explosives company on 11 December 2020. He retired from the military on 1 January 2024 and continued to held office as secretary general in an acting capacity, as the office must be held by an active military officer.

Donny greeting the deputy commander of the United States Indo-Pacific Command, General Bryan P. Fenton, during his visit to the defence ministry in 2025.

Following the election of Prabowo Subianto to the presidency, Donny was named as a possible candidate for his replacement as defense minister. Donny was instead appointed as the deputy minister of defense on 21 October 2024. He continued to hold dual office as the secretary general of the ministry until he was replaced by Tri Budi Utomo on 14 November. On 2 October 2025, Donny was promoted to the honorary rank of air chief marshal in retirement. Donny was installed to an additional position as the governor of the University of the Republic of Indonesia (URI, Universitas Republik Indonesia) on 22 July 2026, an education institution which president Prabowo paralleled with France's École nationale d'administration and projected to produce capabile and skilled administrators.

== Personal life ==
Donny is married to Siti Rahayu since 1996. The couple has a son who is currently serving in the air force and a late daughter.

== Dates of rank ==
Air commodore	13 May 2014
Air vice-marshal	24 July 2017
Air marshal	20 May 2020
Air chief marshal	2 October 2025
