= Yusuf Jauhari =

Indonesian air force officer and vice minister of defense

Vice Minister of Defense (Logistics, Defence Industry, and Technology)
- Incumbent
- Assumed office 15 October 2026 Serving with Richard Tampubolon (Strategy, Doctrine, and Power Buildup)
- President: Prabowo Subianto
- Preceded by: Donny Ermawan Taufanto

Head of the Defence Facilities Agency/Defence Logistics Agency
- Incumbent
- Assumed office 1 October 2020
- Preceded by: Budi Prijono

Personal details
- Born: 4 October 1967 (age 59) Semarang, Central Java, Indonesia
- Spouse: Sjeicha Sjuhda
- Education: Indonesian Air Force Academy; Tri Dharma University (S.Sos.); Royal Melbourne Institute of Technology (M.Eng.)

Military service
- Allegiance: Indonesia
- Branch/service: Air Force
- Years of service: 1990 – now
- Rank: Air chief marshal
- Unit: Electronics

Yusuf Jauhari (born 4 October 1967) is an Indonesian air force officer from the air force's electronic corps who is currently the first vice minister of defense in charge of logistics, defense industry, and technology since 15 October 2026. A longtime officer in the ministry of defence, Yusuf has held multiple staff and leadership positions in the defence ministry since his entry to the ministry in 2012 as a lieutenant colonel.

== Early life, education, and personal life ==
Yusuf was born on 4 October 1967 in Semarang. He graduated from the 3rd Semarang State High School in 1986 and studied at the Yogyakarta National Development "Veteran" University for a year, before enrolling at the air force academy in 1987. He graduated from the air force academy in 1990 and joined the electronic corps as a second lieutenant. Yusuf is married to Sjeicha Sjuhda. He received his bachelor's degree in social sciences from the Tri Dharma University in Balikpapan in 1996 and his master's degree in engineering from the Royal Melbourne Institute of Technology in 2003.

== Military career ==
=== Junior officer ===
Yusuf was initially attached to the air force academy's governor after completing his military education. A year after, in 1991 he was assigned to the 2nd electronics maintenance depot at the Adisoemarmo Air Force Base. In 1998, he was stationed to Balikpapan as the technical chief of the 255th radar unit. He returned to Adisoemarmo in 1999, and for the next seven years was stationed at the 52nd maintenance unit. He was in charge of the display (1999–2001), digital workshop (2001–2002), overall maintenance (2002–2004) section, before being entrusted to command the unit from 2004 to 2006. During his second assignment in Adisoemarmo, he attended the air force's unit command school in 2000 and the air force command and staff college in 2005. Yusuf was then stationed in Balikpapan for a second time as the commander of the 223rd radar unit, serving from 2006 to 2009. He was recalled to the air force electronics service as the chief of operations and radar maintenance section from 2009 to 2012, during which he conducted inspections on air force radar maintenance units.

=== Defence ministry ===
He entered the defense ministry on the same year after he left the air force electronics service as a mid-level analyst for institutitonal relations in the defence ministry's public communications center. After two years in the position, in 2014 he was appointed as chief of the information and crypto section in the defence ministry's information and data center. On 13 January 2015, Yusuf was appointed as the head of the household affairs within the general bureau of the defence ministry's secretariat general.

After two years of serving in the position, on 1 March 2017 Yusuf was appointed to head the defence ministry's information and data center, a one-star position. He was accordingly promoted to the rank of air commodore (first marshal) on 5 May 2017 and reported his promotion to defense minister Ryamizard Ryacudu thirteen days later. Shortly after his appointment, Yusuf welcomed the-then newly appointed armed forces commander Hadi Tjahjanto's special attention on cyberwarfare, as well as engaging in coordinations with other state agencies in anticipation of cyberattacks during the 2018 and 2019 elections. Under Yusuf, the center also began installing chips in country border markers, allowing patrolling soldiers to be immediately notified of any movements in the marker. On 23 March 2018, the armed forces commander issued a decree which rotated Yusuf to head the general affairs bureau within the defence ministry's general secretariat. He took office on 29 March of the same year. Amidst the COVID-19 pandemic, Yusuf was the designated reporting point for ministry staff suspected of catching the virus.

=== Agency head ===
Yusuf was promoted to become the head of the defence ministry's defence facilities agency in a presidential decree signed on 23 September 2020, which was the first mass rotation of military officers made by the-then new defense minister Prabowo Subianto. The change was confirmed by an armed forces commander decree issued two days later, and he was inducted into office in a handover ceremony on 1 October 2020. He handed over his leadership of the general affairs bureau on 6 October and Yusuf received his two-star rank as an air vice-marshal on 21 October. As the agency's head, Yusuf signed a number of fighter jet purchase agreements on behalf of the ministry, such as 42 Dassault Rafale from the Dassault Aviation manufacturer in February 2022 and 24 F-15 Eagle from Boeing in August 2023. He received the air force's top order, the Air Force Meritorious Service Star, 2nd Class (Indonesian: Bintang Swa Bhuwana Paksa Pratama) on 23 August 2021, and on 5 July 2024 reported his promotion to the rank of air marshal to the armed forces commander, followed by a report to the air force chief of staff three days later.

Yusuf (first row, first from the left) at the Arlington National Cemetery, 2026

After Prabowo was elected as Indonesia's president in 2024, Prabowo appointed his longtime colleague Sjafrie Sjamsoeddin as his replacement in the defence ministry. Prabowo kept maintaining a close control of the ministry's organization, and on 5 August 2025 issued a presidential decree which reorganized the defense ministry's structure. The defence ministry's defence facilities agency was renamed and expanded into the defence logistics agency. A day after the presidential decree was issued, the armed forces commander appointed Yusuf to head the renamed agency. Yusuf was installed directly by president Prabowo, along with other newly appointed agency heads, on 10 August 2025. In December 2025, Yusuf was summoned by Prabowo to the presidential palace, with the media speculating his summoning being related to the distribution of humanitarian assistance to victims of Cyclone Senyar in Sumatra. In June 2026, Yusuf announced the government's plans to purchase KAI KF-21 Boramae directly from South Korea.

=== Vice minister of defense ===
On 15 October 2026, Yusuf was installed as the deputy minister of defense in charge of logistics, defense industry, and technology. His rank was announced as a four-star air chief marshal at his inauguration ceremony. Yusuf is the first officer from the electronic corps to become a four-star general, and also the first four-star general whose flag officer assignments were entirely in the defense ministry.

== Dates of rank ==
Air commodore	5 May 2017
Air vice-marshal	21 October 2020
Air marshal	5 July 2024
Air chief marshal	15 October 2026
