= Muhammad Herindra =

Chief of the State Intelligence Agency of Indonesia (born 1964)

General (Hon.) (Ret.) Muhammad Herindra BMP GCROS
- Herindra, 2026

17th Director of State Intelligence Agency
- Incumbent
- Assumed office 21 October 2024
- President: Prabowo Subianto
- Preceded by: Budi Gunawan

9th Deputy Minister of Defense
- In office 23 December 2020 – 21 October 2024
- President: Joko Widodo
- Minister: Prabowo Subianto
- Preceded by: Sakti Wahyu Trenggono
- Succeeded by: Donny Ermawan Taufanto

Chief of General Staff of the Armed Forces
- In office 27 October 2020 – 30 December 2020
- Preceded by: Joni Supriyanto
- Succeeded by: Ganip Warsito

Inspector General of the Armed Forces
- In office March 2018 – 27 October 2020
- Preceded by: Dodik Wijanarko
- Succeeded by: Bambang Suswantono

Personal details
- Born: 30 November 1964 (age 61) Magelang, Central Java
- Education: Indonesian Military Academy; University of Salford; National University of Malaysia

Military service
- Allegiance: Indonesia
- Branch/service: Indonesian Army; State Intelligence Agency
- Years of service: 1987—2022; 2024–present
- Rank: General (Honorary)
- Unit: Infantry (Kopassus)
- Battles/wars: Indonesian invasion of East Timor; Insurgency in Aceh; Papua conflict

Muhammad Herindra (born 30 November 1964) is a retired Indonesian general and the current Chief of the State Intelligence Agency, a position he has held since October 2024. He previously served as the Deputy Minister of Defense from 23 December 2020 to 20 October 2024 on Widodo's Cabinet. Herindra previously served various roles in the military, such as the Chief of General Staff of the Armed Forces, Inspector General of the Armed Forces, and Commandant General of Kopassus, Indonesia's elite special forces unit.

== Early life ==
Herindra was born on 30 November 1964, in Magelang, Central Java. Herindra's father, Hudaya, was a retired lieutenant colonel, who worked in a fertilizer company.

Herindra spent most of his childhood in Magelang. He completed his secondary education at the 1st Magelang Junior High School in 1980. He then moved to Jakarta, where he completed his high school education at the 8th Jakarta Senior High School in 1983. Herindra currently chairs the school's alumni association.

== Military education ==
Herindra entered the Indonesian Military Academy the same year after graduating from high school. He was commissioned as an infantry second lieutenant upon graduating from the academy in 1987. He was a recipient of Adhi Makayasa, a distinction given to the best graduate of each class in the academy.

Upon completing his military education, Herindra was selected to join Kopassus, Indonesia's army special forces unit. He underwent infantry and special forces training before joining the unit. In his later career, he also received advanced military education in the Indonesian Army Command and General Staff College from 1999 until 2000, and the Malaysian Armed Forces Staff College in 2011.

Herindra earned a master's degree in intelligence and international relations from the University of Salford in 1994, and another in social sciences from the National University of Malaysia in 2011.

== Military career ==
=== Early career ===
Herindra began his career as junior officer for training and organization in Kopassus. He held various commanding and non-commanding position in Kopassus, including a stint as Kopassus's public information officer in 2000. He eventually reached the rank of lieutenant colonel in 2001, and became the commander of the 812th Kopassus Infantry Battalion, a support battalion for the 81th Counterterrorism Special Unit.

Herindra underwent his first military assignment outside Kopassus as senior assistant officer for intelligence in the Bukit Barisan (North Sumatra) Regional Military Command. Less than a year later, he was transferred to Bengkalis in Riau as the regency's military district commander. Herindra was involved in countering rampant illegal logging and returned 27 tons of illegal logs in 2005.

Herindra was reassigned to the Indonesian Military Academy in 2007, as the deputy commander of the cadet corps. Less than a year later, in 2008, Herindra became the intelligence assistant to Kopassus commander Pramono Edhie Wibowo. He was rotated to the Jakarta Regional Military Command on 14 May 2009 to hold the same position.

On 29 July 2010, Herindra was relieved from his position as intelligence assistant and was posted to the Army Intelligence Center as the director for research and development. After receiving his master's degree from the National University of Malaysia in 2011, Herindra was appointed by Pramono Edhie Wibowo, who had already become the army chief of staff, as his personal staff coordinator.

=== Military area and region commander ===
Herindra returned to territorial office on 15 June 2012 as the Commander of the Antasari Military Area, covering the South Kalimantan province. During his tenure in South Kalimantan, Herindra oversaw changes in several key positions in the military area. He visited districts in South Kalimantan to consolidate relations with the local government. Herindra also received the honorary Bhayangkara Bahari Utama (Chief Naval Police) brevet from South Kalimantan's water police.

On 10 June 2013, Herindra was appointed the deputy commanding general of Kopassus. He was installed on 8 July and continued to hold dual office until 24 July. During his tenure, Herindra represented the unit in an agreement with the Gadjah Mada University. After serving as deputy commander, he briefly served as the Chief of Staff of the Siliwangi Regional Military Command, which covers West Java, from 31 January to 27 August 2015.

Herindra returned to Kopassus as its commandant general on 25 July 2015, replacing Doni Monardo who was transferred to Maluku. He was installed for the position six days later and was promoted to the rank of major general on 25 August. He was the second Adhi Makayasa recipient to serve as Kopassus commanding general. He was then appointed to command the Siliwangi Regional Military Command on 16 September 2016. He was officially installed on 7 October and handed over his old office to his deputy, Madsuni, the next day.

In January 2017, Herindra dismsissed Lieutenant Colonel Ubaidillah from his position as Commander of the Lebak Military District. This action was taken due to Ubaidillah's failure to follow standard operating procedures during a military training exercise, which included members of the Islamic Defenders Front. Herindra stated that the dismissal was strictly a matter of procedural violation. He ended his tenure on 14 November 2017 and was replaced by Doni Monardo.

=== Armed forces and defence ministry assignment ===
From Siliwangi, Herindra was assigned to the armed forces headquarters, where he served as a senior expert staff for international affairs to armed forces commander Gatot Nurmantyo. Gatot retired shortly afterwards, and his replacement, Hadi Tjahjanto, promoted Herindra in March 2018 to become the Inspector General of the Armed Forces, the third-highest position in the armed forces. Herindra received his third star on 7 April 2018 and was further promoted on 21 October 2020 as the Chief of General Staff of the Armed Forces. He assumed the office of chief of general staff on 27 October.

Less than two months into his tenure as chief of general staff, Herindra was appointed as the deputy minister of defence, accompanying defence minister Prabowo Subianto. He was installed by President Joko Widodo alongside four other deputy ministers on 23 December 2020. He retired from the military in 2022.

On 16 October 2024, Herindra was nominated by Joko Widodo as chief of the state intelligence agency. His nomination was approved by the House of Representatives. He was installed for the new office a day after Joko Widodo was replaced by Prabowo Subianto.

== Personal life ==
Herindra is married to Eka Diyah Rusyati, a dentist. The couple has a son named Arief Akbar Herlambang. Arief's marriage in December 2022, was attended by President Joko Widodo and Prabowo Subianto, who acted as the wedding witnesses.

== Honours ==
As the officer at Indonesian Army, he has received several orders, decorations and awards, namely:

=== National Honours ===
- Star of Dharma
- Star of Kartika Eka Paksi, 1st Class – 2025
- Star of Jalasena, 1st Class – 2025
- Star of Swa Bhuwana Paksa, 1st Class – 2025
- Star of Yudha Dharma, 2nd Class – 2016
- Star of Kartika Eka Paksi, 2nd Class
- Star of Bhayangkara, 2nd Class – 2021
- Star of Yudha Dharma, 3rd Class
- Star of Kartika Eka Paksi, 3rd Class
- Military Long Service Medal, 32 Years
- Active Duty in the Army Medal
- Military Long Service Medal, 24 Years
- Military Long Service Medal, 16 Years
- Military Long Service Medal, 8 Years
- Medal for National Defense Service
- Medal for Active Duty in Indonesia's Outer Islands
- Medal for Active Duty as a Border Guard
- Satyalancana Ksatria Yudha
- Timor Military Campaign Medal w/ 2 gold star
- Military Instructor Service Medal
- Social Welfare Service Medal
- Star of Peace Veteran – 2024

=== Foreign honours ===
Ribbon	Distinction	Country	Date	Reference
	Grand Cross of the Royal Order of Sahametrei	Cambodia	Unknown	
