= Aminuddin Ponulele =

Indonesian academician and politician (1939–2021)

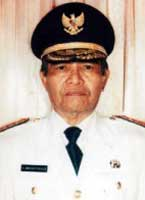

13th Governor of Central Sulawesi
- In office 21 February 2001 – 21 February 2006
- President: Abdurrahman Wahid; Megawati Soekarnoputri; Susilo Bambang Yudhoyono
- Preceded by: Bandjela Paliudju
- Succeeded by: Bandjela Paliudju

Personal details
- Born: 5 July 1939 Palu, Residentie Manado, Dutch East Indies
- Died: 27 January 2021 (aged 81) Palu, Central Sulawesi, Indonesia

Aminuddin Ponulele (5 July 1939 – 27 January 2021) was an Indonesian academic and politician who served as Governor of Central Sulawesi from 2001 to 2006. He also served as the speaker of the Central Sulawesi Provincial House of Representatives from 2009 to 2019. He also ran as a candidate for governor in the Central Sulawesi Provincial General Election in 2011.

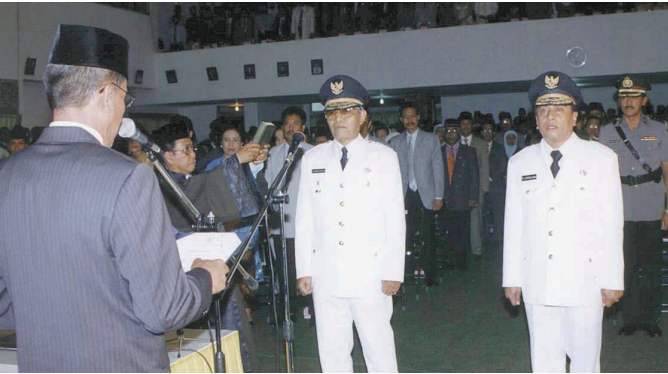
Aminuddin Ponulele (middle) taking the oath of office as the Governor of Central Sulawesi on 21 February 2001.

Aminuddin died on 27 January 2021 at the age of 81.
