= Titular and honorary rank =

Indonesian special military ranks

In the Indonesian military, titular and honorary ranks are two different types of special military ranks. Unlike the normal rank in the Indonesian military, titular and honorary ranks could be given to civilians who served temporarily in the military or contributed to the military.

== Titular rank ==
=== Background ===
Titular rank have been given since the Indonesian National Revolution. During the revolution, the office of governors, residents, and regents were transformed into military offices, which allowed them to regulate military affairs in their region. In their capacity, they were given titular military ranks. Military governors were given the titular rank of general major, military residents were given the titular rank of lieutenant colonel, and military regents were given the titular rank of major.

Several military offices during the revolution also involve civilian officeholders. An example of this is the Army Political Education Staff and the Military Court. The Army Political Education Staff, which was intended to educate the military on non-military matters, consisted of civilians. As such, these civilians were given the titular rank of major general. Similarly, the military court during the revolution was filled with civilian judges due to the lack of military officers with law backgrounds. These civilian judges were given titular ranks, with the highest being the titular rank of lieutenant general for the chief justice of the supreme army court and the lowest being the titular rank of captain for the court clerk.

=== Regulation ===
The first regulation on titular ranks was enacted on 1 August 1946 with the Government Decree No. 7 of 1946. The regulation specifies the use of titular ranks within the military courts. The decree was later amended with the enactment of Government Decree No. 45 of 1948 on 9 October 1948.

Regulations about special military ranks were later merged to the Government Decree No. 36 of 1959, which was enacted on 26 June 1959.

=== Titular rank holders ===
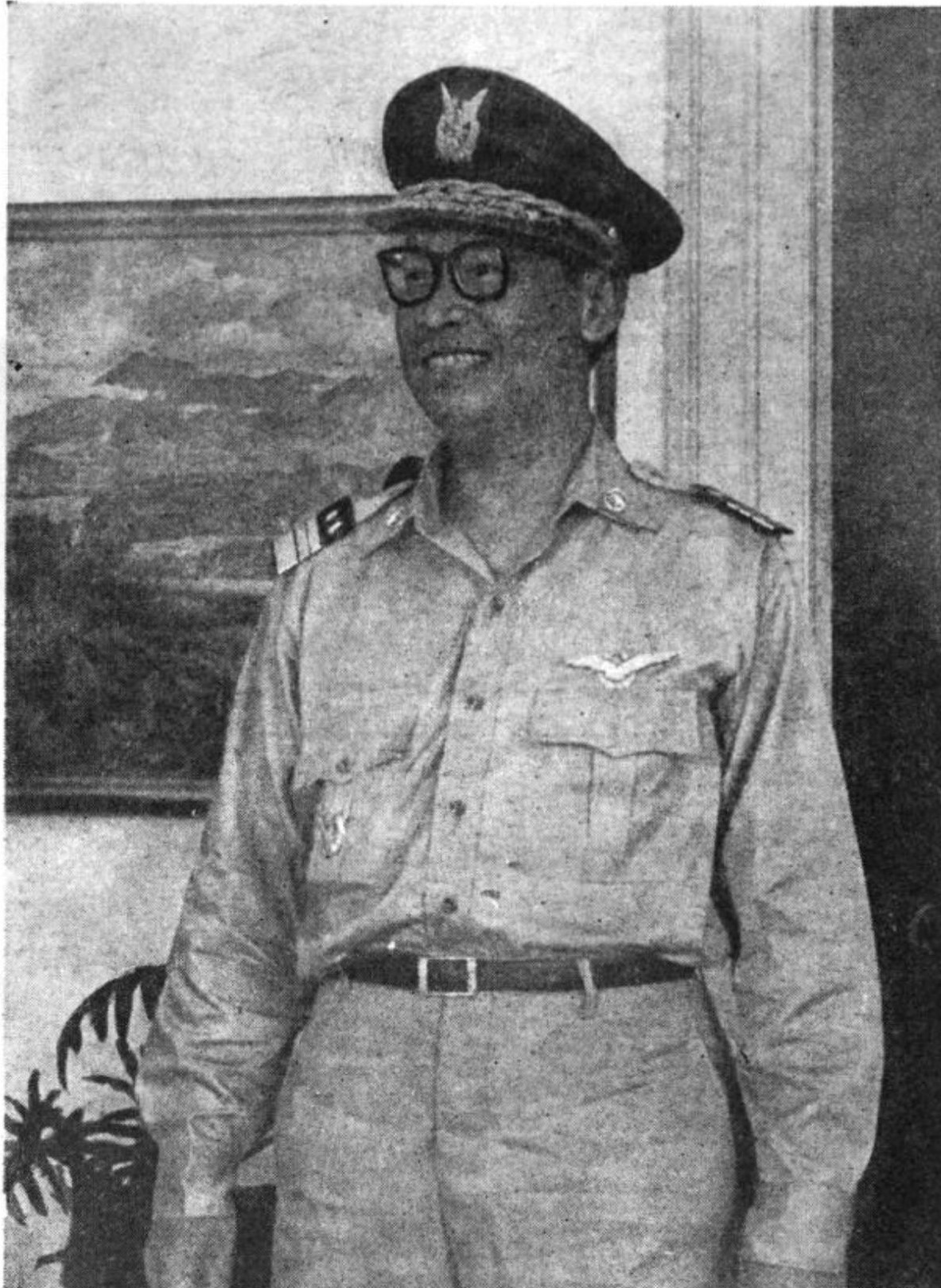
Air Vice Admiral (Titular) Subandrio in his air vice admiral uniform.

==== Titular flag officers ====
- Hamengkubuwono IX (titular general)
- Roeslan Abdulgani (titular general)
- Chairul Saleh (titular lieutenant general, later promoted to titular general on 17 August 1964, titular rank converted to honorary rank posthumously on 22 June 1967)
- Johannes Leimena (titular vice admiral, later promoted to titular admiral on 17 August 1964)
- Soebandrio (titular air vice admiral, later promoted to titular air admiral on 17 August 1964)
- Daud Beureueh (titular general major)
- Ferdinand Lumban Tobing (titular general major)
- Nugroho Notosusanto (titular brigadier general)

==== Titular officers ====
- Kyai Haji Darip Klender (titular lieutenant colonel)
- Melanchton Siregar (titular colonel)
- Idris Sardi (titular lieutenant colonel)
- Deddy Corbuzier (titular lieutenant colonel)

== Honorary rank ==
Honorary ranks are usually given as a promotion to retired military officers. Retired military officers who serve as ministers usually received honorary rank promotion.

=== Honorary rank holders ===
==== Honorary generals ====
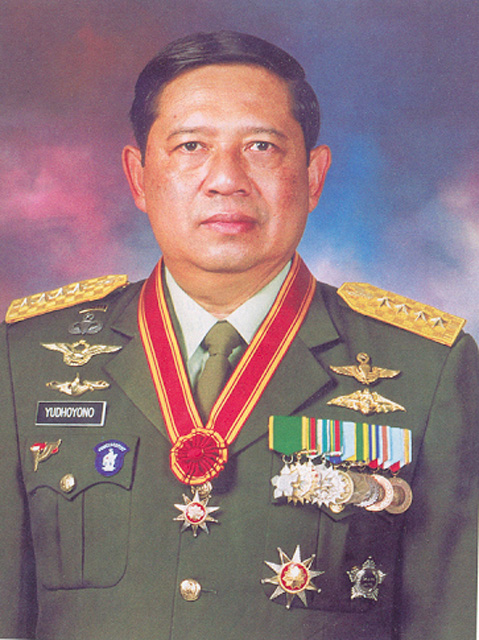
General (Honorary) Susilo Bambang Yudhoyono

- Chairul Saleh (posthumous)
- Achmad Tahir
- Susilo Sudarman
- Agum Gumelar
- Luhut Binsar Pandjaitan
- Susilo Bambang Yudhoyono
- Hari Sabarno
- Abdullah Mahmud Hendropriyono
- Prabowo Subianto
- Sjafrie Sjamsoeddin
- Muhammad Herindra
- Ali Sadikin (posthumous)
- Yunus Yosfiah
- Agus Sutomo

==== Honorary lieutenant generals ====
- Azwar Anas
- Ary Mardjono
- Z.A. Maulani
- Kentot Harseno
- Sintong Panjaitan
- Soehartono Soeratman
- Bambang Eko Suharyanto
- Chairawan Kadarsyah Kadirussalam Nusyirwan
- Musa Bangun
- Glenny Kairupan
- Tony S.B. Hoesodo

==== Honorary major generals ====
- Paku Alam VIII
- Muchlis Ibrahim
- Bandjela Paliudju
- Taufik Hidayat
