= Syafruddin Kambo =

Indonesian politician (1961–2025)

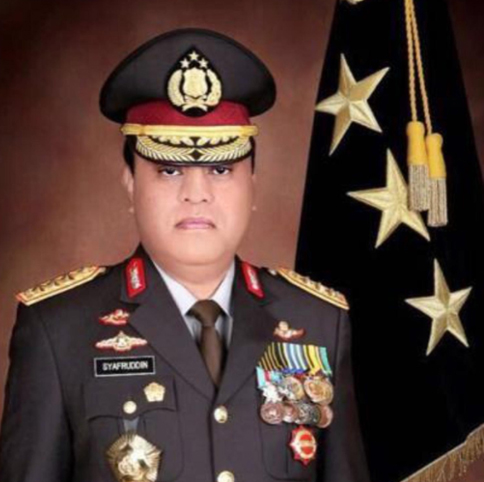
- Syafruddin in 2017

Minister of State Apparatus Utilization and Bureaucratic Reform
- In office 15 August 2018 – 20 October 2019
- Preceded by: Asman Abnur
- Succeeded by: Tjahjo Kumolo

Personal details
- Born: 12 April 1961 Makassar, Indonesia
- Died: 20 February 2025 (aged 63) Jakarta, Indonesia
- Party: Independent
- Education: Police Academy of the Republic of Indonesia
- Occupation: Police officer

Syafruddin Kambo (12 April 1961 – 20 February 2025) was an Indonesian politician. An independent, he served as Minister of State Apparatus Utilization and Bureaucratic Reform from 2018 to 2019.

Syafruddin died in Jakarta on 20 February 2025, at the age of 63.
