= Sjafrie Sjamsoeddin =

Indonesian politician (born 1952)

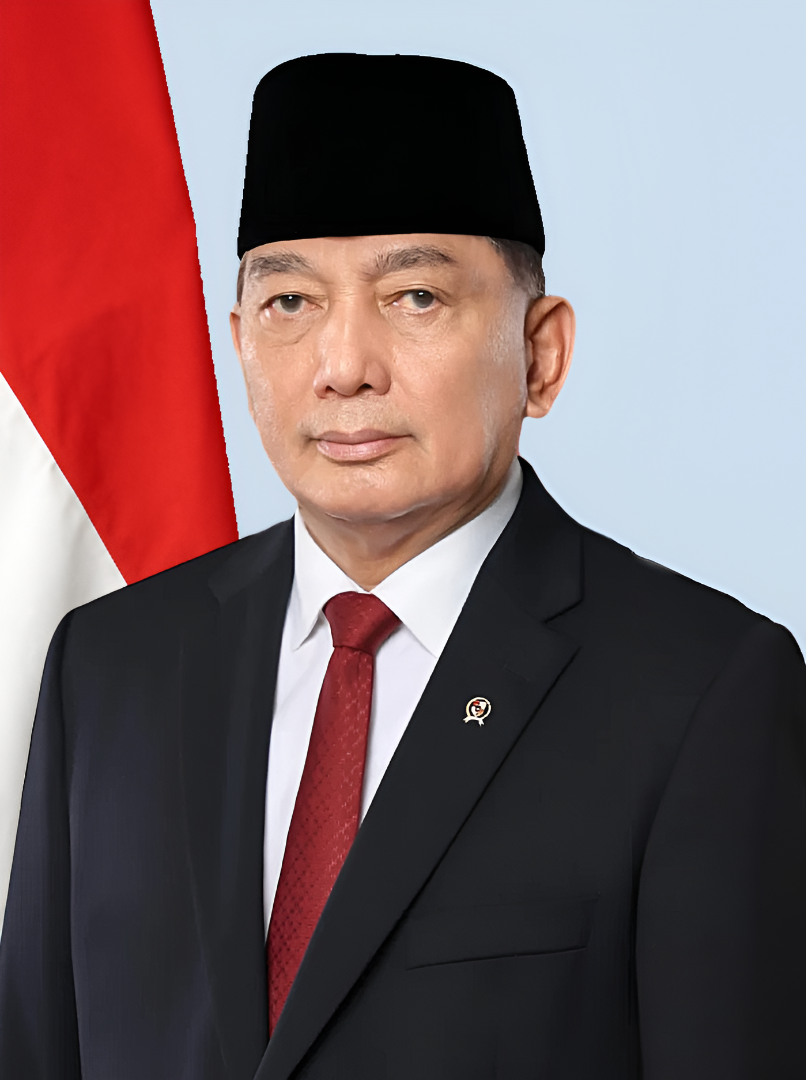
- Official portrait, 2025

27th Minister of Defense
- Incumbent
- Assumed office 21 October 2024
- President: Prabowo Subianto
- Deputy: Donny Ermawan Taufanto; Yusuf Jauhari; Richard Tampubolon
- Preceded by: Prabowo Subianto

Coordinating Minister for Political and Security Affairs
- Acting
- In office 8 September 2025 – 17 September 2025
- President: Prabowo Subianto
- Deputy: Lodewijk Freidrich Paulus
- Preceded by: Budi Gunawan
- Succeeded by: Djamari Chaniago

7th Deputy Minister of Defense
- In office 6 January 2010 – 20 October 2014
- President: Susilo Bambang Yudhoyono
- Minister: Purnomo Yusgiantoro
- Preceded by: Moersjid (1966)
- Succeeded by: Sakti Wahyu Trenggono

Commander of Kodam Jaya
- In office 1997–1998
- President: Suharto
- Preceded by: Sutiyoso
- Succeeded by: Djaja Suparman

Personal details
- Born: 30 October 1952 (age 74) Makassar, Indonesia
- Party: Independent
- Spouse: Etty Sudiyati
- Education: Indonesian Military Academy; Indonesian Institute of Business Management (MBA); Indonesian Defense University (PhD)
- Occupation: Politician; army officer

Military service
- Allegiance: Indonesia
- Branch/service: Indonesian Army
- Years of service: 1974–2010
- Rank: General (Honorary)
- Unit: Kopassus (Special Forces)
- Commands: Kopassus
- Battles/wars: Operation Lotus; Insurgency in Aceh; Papua conflict

Sjafrie Sjamsoeddin (born 30 October 1952) is an Indonesian army officer and politician serving as the 27th minister of defense since 2024. From 2010 to 2014, he served as deputy minister of defense. He was once Suharto's bodyguard and one of his most loyal confidants until his downfall and also an old friend of Indonesia's incumbent president Prabowo Subianto, who was his classmate at the military academy.

Sjafrie Sjamsoeddin served in the Indonesian military and was a member of the Kopassus unit. He was accused of human rights abuses throughout his military career. He participated in the Indonesian invasion of East Timor and was later reported to be present at the Santa Cruz massacre in 1991, and the 1999 East Timorese crisis. He was also accused of involvement over the 1997–98 activists kidnappings in Indonesia and the May 1998 riots in Jakarta, where he was the city's military commander at the time. He was cleared by Indonesian authorities over the riots and was not formally charged in East Timor or the kidnappings, although he was dismissed from the military over the latter issue. In 2009, he was denied a visa by the United States when he was an adviser to then-president Susilo Bambang Yudhoyono.

== Early life ==
Sjafrie was born in Makassar on 30 October 1952. He was the 6th child out of 11 siblings from Sjamsoeddin Koernia, a former soldier, and Hamdana. Sjafrie enrolled into the Indonesian Military Academy on 1971 and graduated in 1974 with Sjafrie given the best graduate award. He made friends with Prabowo Subianto and Ryamizard Ryacudu who were his classmates. On 1989, he enrolled into Indonesian Army Command and General Staff College.

== Military career ==
After graduating, Sjafrie and Prabowo joined Kopassus, the special forces arm of the Indonesian Army. Sjafrie participated in numerous conflicts in East Timor, Aceh, and West Papua. His first command was as a platoon commander in Group 1 Para Commandos He took part in Operation Lotus as a part of the invasion force to East Timor, becoming the commander of Force Nanggala X on 1976. In 1985, Sjafrie attended an advanced training course for infantry officers in Fort Benning. In 1990, he was head of the Satuan Gabungan Intelijen (SGI) in East Timor, the Kopassus intelligence service. According to reports, he was involved in planning the Santa Cruz massacre of 1991. In 1993, he underwent two weeks of training at the Special Air Service base in Swanbourne, near Perth, Australia.

From 1993 to 1995, Sjafrie was commander of Group A of the Presidential Security Guard (PASPAMPRES) and he was responsible for the security of Soeharto when he visited Bosnia and Herzegovina in 1995.

== Post-military career ==
Sjafrie was appointed as Deputy Minister of Defense by Susilo Bambang Yudhoyono on 6 January 2010. He was assigned under Minister Purnomo Yusgiantoro from 6 January 2010 to 20 October 2014.

On 30 December 2019, Prabowo Subianto, then-Minister of Defense under Joko Widodo appointed Sjafrie Sjamsoeddin as his special adviser. According to Prabowo's staff, Sjafrie will play a role in assisting and advising Prabowo on defence policy.

=== Minister of Defense ===
After the 2024 Indonesian presidential election, Sjafrie became a strong candidate to be one of Prabowo's ministers. Despite not being present on the call up on 14 October 2024, Sjafrie appeared in Prabowo's retreat in Hambalang along with other members of the incoming government.

Sjafrie is appointed as Minister of Defense by Prabowo Subianto as his successor on 21 October 2024. At the time of the appointment, Sjafrie is the oldest minister in the Red and White Cabinet. Prabowo handed his old job as Minister of Defense to Sjafrie in a handover ceremony during the next day, expressing his confidence to his friend. Sjafrie's policies as Minister of Defense largely continued the policies outlined by his predecessor, who is now the president.

He temporarily served as Coordinating Minister for Political and Security Affairs after the dismissal of Budi Gunawan due to the August 2025 Indonesian protests. He then ceded the ministry to Djamari Chaniago.

=== Tenure ===
On 13 April 2026, Sjafrie along with United States Secretary of Defense Pete Hegseth signed a major defence cooperation partnership that will improve ties based on modernization of the armed forces, professional military training, and bilateral cooperation. The agreement was controversial due to a proposed "blanket overflight access" from the American side which could endanger Indonesia's nonaligned status and may risk draging Indonesia into foreign conflicts where America was involved. On 21 April, Sjafrie clarifies that there is no agreement on the overflight access, which was confirmed by Deputy Speaker Utut Adianto (PDI-P - Central Java VII) through a WhatsApp message.

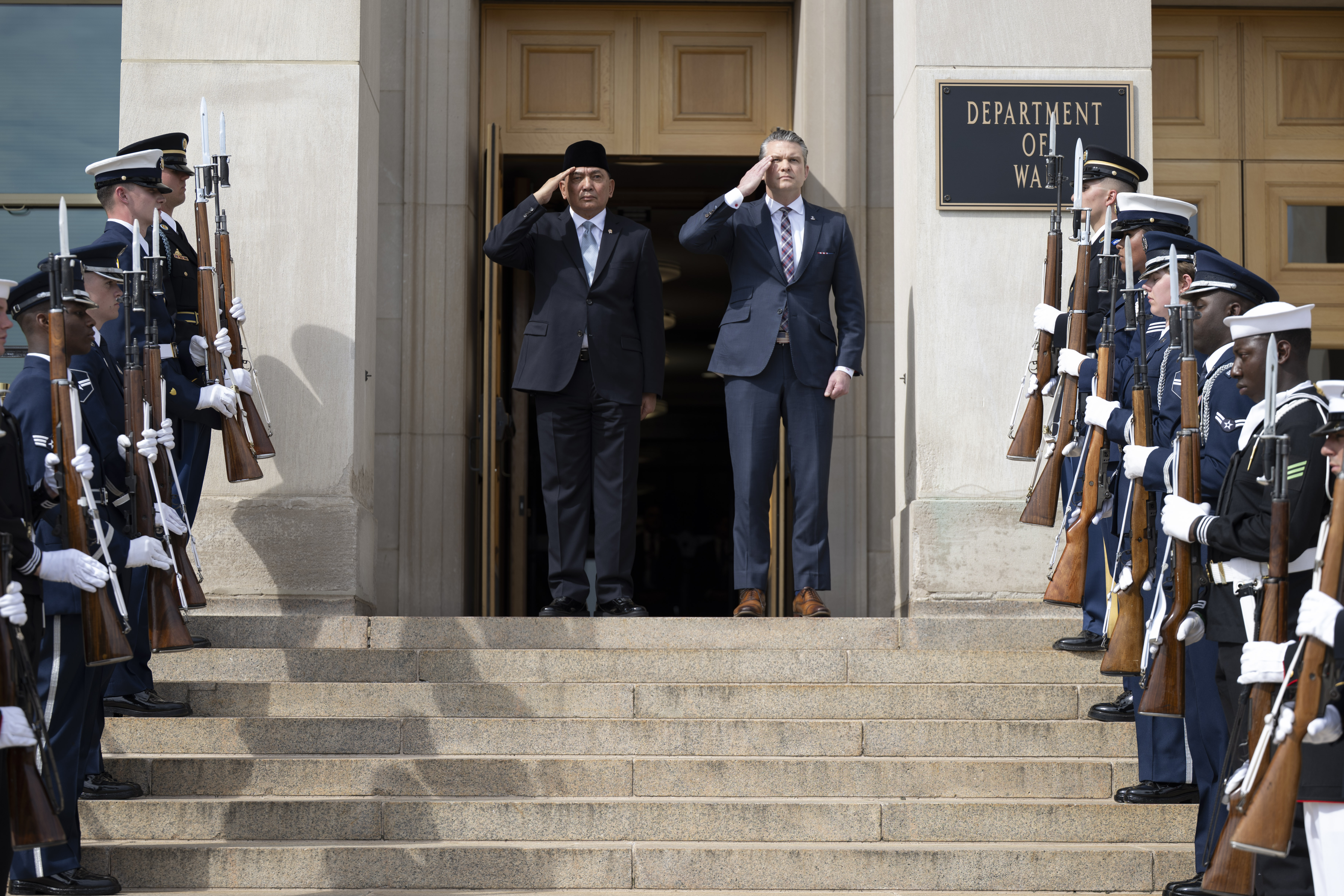
Sjafrie Sjamsoeddin with Secretary of Defense Pete Hegseth

On 19 May 2026, Sjafrie said in a parliamentary session that Secretary of Defense Pete Hegseth offered to turn Kertajati International Airport into a maintenance, repair, and overhaul site for Lockheed C-130 Hercules for Asia. This offer was misinterpreted by many mainstream media such as Kompas and Tempo as turning Kertajati into an American military base. The offer was criticized by Tubagus Hasanuddin (PDI-P - West Java IX), pressuring the government to be cautious with the deal because the deal may violate Indonesia's non-alignment stances. PDI-P secretary general Hasto Kristiyanto also condemned the deal because the deal would infringe Indonesia's national sovereignty and historical creed. Meanwhile, aviation expert and former parliamentarian Alvin Lie said that the deal must be reconsider because the deal was made with Pete Hegseth, not with the manufacturer Lockheed Martin and American military personnel may be stationed in Kertajati to safeguard the technology possessed. Sjafrie clarified that the MRO deal will not result in an American military presence in Indonesian soil.

== Personal life ==
Sjafrie is married to Etty Sudiyati and he has 2 children. He has a younger brother, Maroef Sjamsoeddin who served as Vice Director of the State Intelligence Agency.

== Honours ==
As an Indonesian Army officer and Minister of Defence, Sjafrie Sjamsoeddin received the following awards and decorations:

=== National Honours ===
- Star of Mahaputera, 3rd Class – 2014
- Star of Dharma – 2007
- Star of Yudha Dharma, 1st Class – 2025
- Star of Kartika Eka Paksi, 1st Class – 2025
- Star of Jalasena, 1st Class – 2025
- Star of Swa Bhuwana Paksa, 1st Class – 2025
- Star of Yudha Dharma, 2nd Class
- Star of Kartika Eka Paksi, 2nd Class
- Star of Yudha Dharma, 3rd Class
- Star of Kartika Eka Paksi, 3rd Class
- Active Duty in the Army Medal
- Military Long Service Medal, 24 Years
- Military Long Service Medal, 16 Years
- Military Long Service Medal, 8 Years
- Military Operation Service Medal in Aceh
- Military Instructor Service Medal
- Military Operation Service Medal IX Raksaka Dharma
- Timor Military Campaign Medal w/ 2 gold star
- Role Model Medal
- Star of Peace Veteran – 2025

=== Foreign honours ===
Ribbon	Distinction	Country	Date	Reference
	Commander of the National Order of the Legion of Honour	France	14 July 2025	

Political offices
Preceded by Prabowo Subianto	Minister of Defense; 2024—present	Incumbent
Preceded by Hidajat	Deputy Minister of Defense; 2010—2014	Succeeded by Sakti Wahyu Trenggono
Military offices
Preceded by Suprihadi	Secretary General of the Ministry of Defense; 2005—2010	Succeeded by Eris Herryanto
Preceded by Sutiyoso	Commander of Jayakarta Military Command; 1997—1998	Succeeded by Djaja Suparman
Preceded by Susilo Bambang Yudhoyono	Chief of Staff of Jayakarta Military Command; 1996—1997	Succeeded by Sudi Silalahi
