= List of ministers of defense (Indonesia) =

Indonesian cabinet role

Minister of Defense of the Republic of Indonesia
- Menteri Pertahanan Republik Indonesia
- Seal of the Ministry of Defense

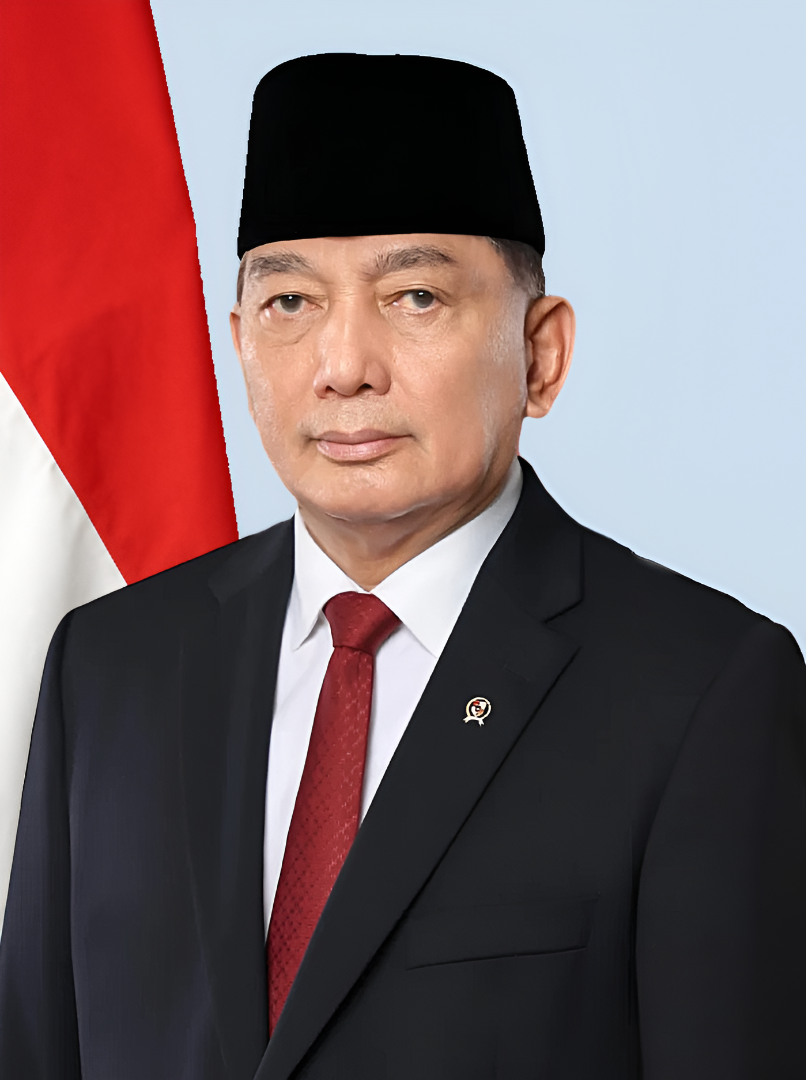
- Incumbent; Sjafrie Sjamsoeddin since 21 October 2024
- Ministry of Defense
- Style: His Exellency
- Member of: Cabinet; National Defense Council
- Reports to: President
- Seat: Jl. Medan Merdeka Barat No. 13-14, Jakarta 10110
- Appointer: President
- Inaugural holder: Supriyadi (Note: Never took office due to disappearance); Amir Sjarifuddin (de facto)
- Formation: 19 August 1945; 81 years ago
- Deputy: Vice Minister of Defense
- Website: www.kemhan.go.id

The minister of defense of the Republic of Indonesia (Indonesian: Menteri Pertahanan) is the head of the Indonesian Ministry of Defense. The minister is tasked with organizing government affairs in the field of national defense.

The current minister of defense is Sjafrie Sjamsoeddin, who has served in the position since 21 October 2024.

== List of ministers ==
The following is a list of people and politicians who have been appointed ministers of defense in Indonesia.

Independent (12) PSI (1) PNI (3) Parindra (1) Masyumi (3); Military (5) Golkar (4) PKB (2) Gerindra (1)
#	Portrait	Name	Took office	Left office	Cabinet	Notes
1		Supriyadi	2 September 1945	20 October 1945	Presidential	(Note: The office were first named 'Minister of People's Security' (Menteri Keamanan Rakyat)) (Note: Supriyadi never appeared in Jakarta to accept the appointment. He was to be considered missing until 9 August 1975 when he was declared National Hero of Indonesia, an award only bestowed posthumously)
—		Sulyoadikusumo (ad interim)	20 October 1945	14 November 1945	Presidential	
2		Amir Sjarifuddin	14 November 1945	12 March 1946	Sjahrir I	
2		Amir Sjarifuddin	12 March 1946	2 October 1946	Sjahrir II	(Note: During Sjahrir's second cabinet, the office were renamed 'Minister of Defense' (Menteri Pertahanan))
2		Amir Sjarifuddin	2 October 1946	26 June 1947	Sjahrir III	
2		Amir Sjarifuddin	3 July 1947	11 November 1947	Amir Sjarifuddin I	(Note: Sjarifuddin held the office concurrently as both Prime Minister and Minister of Defense)
2		Amir Sjarifuddin	11 November 1947	23 January 1948	Amir Sjarifuddin II	
—		Mohammad Hatta (ad interim)	29 January 1948	15 July 1948	Hatta I	(Note: Hatta held the office concurrently as Vice President, Prime Minister, and ad interim Minister of Defense)
3		Hamengkubuwono IX	15 July 1948	4 August 1949	Hatta I	
—		Sjafruddin Prawiranegara	19 December 1948	13 July 1949	Emergency	(Note: Prawiranegara held the office concurrently as Chairman of the Emergency Government and Minister of Defense)
(3)		Hamengkubuwono IX	9 August 1949	20 December 1949	Hatta II	
(3)		Hamengkubuwono IX	20 December 1949	6 June 1950	Federal	
4		Abdul Halim	6 June 1950	17 December 1950	Natsir	(Note: Halim resigned from his post as of 17 December 1950 due to illness)
—		Mohammad Natsir (ad interim)	17 December 1950	27 April 1951	Natsir	(Note: Following Halim's resignation, Natsir held the office concurrently as Prime Minister and ad interim Minister of Defense)
5		Raden Mas Sewaka	9 May 1951	3 April 1952	Sukiman-Suwirjo	
(3)		Hamengkubuwono IX	3 April 1952	2 June 1953	Wilopo	(Note: Hamengkubuwono IX resigned from his post as of 2 June 1953)
6		Wilopo	2 June 1953	30 July 1953	Wilopo	(Note: Following Hamengkubuwono IX's resignation, Wilopo held the office concurrently as Prime Minister and Minister of Defense)
7		Iwa Koesoemasoemantri	30 July 1953	13 July 1955	Ali Sastromidjojo I	(Note: Koesoemasoemantri resigned from his post as of 13 July 1955. The office remained vacant until the next cabinet)
—		Zainul Arifin (ad interim)	13 July 1955	12 August 1955	Ali Sastromidjojo I	
8		Burhanuddin Harahap	12 August 1955	24 March 1956	Burhanuddin Harahap	(Note: Harahap held the office concurrently as both Prime Minister and Minister of Defense)
9		Ali Sastroamidjojo	24 March 1956	9 April 1957	Ali Sastromidjojo II	(Note: Sastroamidjojo held the office concurrently as both Prime Minister and Minister of Defense)
10		Djuanda Kartawidjaja	9 April 1957	10 July 1959	Djuanda	(Note: Djuanda held the office concurrently as both Prime Minister and Minister of Defense)
11		Abdul Haris Nasution	10 July 1959	18 February 1960	Working I	(Note: During the First Working Cabinet, the office were renamed 'Minister of Security and Defense' (Menteri Keamanan dan Pertahanan))
11		Abdul Haris Nasution	18 February 1960	6 March 1962	Working II	(Note: Later during the Second Working Cabinet, it was renamed again as 'Minister of National Security' (Menteri Keamanan Nasional))
11		Abdul Haris Nasution	6 March 1962	13 November 1963	Working III	(Note: The office were reorganized during the Third Working Cabinet, with the office merged into 'Deputy First Minister/Defense and Security Coordinator' (Wakil Menteri Pertama/Koordinator Pertahanan/Keamanan). Nasution also held the post with the office of 'Minister/Army Chief of Staff' (Menteri/Kepala Staf Angkatan Darat)) (Note: It would be renamed again on 22 January 1962 as 'Deputy First Minister/Minister/Army Chief of Staff' (Wakil Menteri Pertama/Menteri/Kepala Staf Angkatan Darat))
11		Abdul Haris Nasution	13 November 1963	27 August 1964	Working IV	(Note: It would be reorganized again during the Fourth Working Cabinet, when it was transformed into the 'Coordinating Minister on Defense and Security' (Menteri Koordinator Pertahanan Keamanan), a precursor to the present-day Coordinating Ministry for Political, Legal, and Security Affairs)
11		Abdul Haris Nasution	27 August 1964	24 February 1966	Dwikora I	(Note: Other changes occurred during the original Dwikora Cabinet, when it was renamed Coordinating 'Minister/Armed Forces Chief of Staff' (Menteri Koordinator/Kepala Staf Angkatan Bersenjata), as Nasution were appointed chief of staff of the Indonesian National Armed Forces, separated from the Army, Navy, and Air Force, whose commanders were also elevated to Minister)
12		Sarbini Martodihardjo	24 February 1966	28 March 1966	Dwikora II	(Note: On 24 February 1966, Nasution were removed from his cabinet post and the office of armed forces chief of staff were abolished) (Note: The office were renamed 'Coordinating Minister on Defense and Security' (Menteri Koordinator Pertahanan dan Keamanan))
13		Suharto	28 March 1966	25 July 1966	Dwikora III	(Note: The office were elevated into the office of 'Deputy Prime Minister on Defense and Security' (Wakil Perdana Menteri Pertahanan dan Keamanan)) (Note: Suharto also concurrently held the office of 'Minister/Commander of the Army' (Menteri/Panglima Angkatan Darat))
13		Suharto	25 July 1966	17 October 1967	Ampera I	(Note: The office were renamed as 'Chief Minister on Defense and Security' (Menteri Utama bidang Pertahanan dan Keamanan)) (Note: Suharto also concurrently held the office of Cabinet Presidium (essentially the head of government)) (Note: Since 12 March 1967, Suharto was appointed Acting President after Sukarno was removed from the presidency)
13		Suharto	17 October 1967	6 June 1968	Ampera II	(Note: Suharto held the office concurrently as the Commander of the Armed Forces (Panglima Angkatan Bersenjata)) (Note: Since 27 March 1968, Suharto's acting presidency ended and he was formally sworn in as President)
13		Suharto	6 June 1968	9 September 1971	Development I	(Note: The office were restored as 'Minister of Defense and Security' (Menteri Pertahanan dan Keamanan)) (Note: Suharto held the office concurrently as President, Minister of Defense and Security, and Commander of the Armed Forces)
14		Maraden Panggabean	9 September 1971	28 March 1973	Development I	(Note: Panggabean held the office concurrently as Minister of Defense and Security as well as Commander of the Armed Forces)
14		Maraden Panggabean	28 March 1973	29 March 1978	Development II	
15		Mohammad Jusuf	31 March 1978	19 March 1983	Development III	(Note: Jusuf held the office concurrently as Minister of Defense and Security as well as Commander of the Armed Forces)
16		Poniman	19 March 1983	21 March 1988	Development IV	
17		Benny Moerdani	21 March 1988	17 March 1993	Development V	
18		Edi Sudradjat	17 March 1993	14 March 1998	Development VI	(Note: Until 21 May 1993, Sudradjat also held the post of Commander of the Armed Forces) (Note: Meanwhile Sudradjat also, until 23 March 1993, held the post of Army Chief of Staff) (Note: Between his appointment to the cabinet on 17 March 1993 until 23 March 1993, he was the only person to held the office of Minister of Defense and Security, Commander of the Armed Forces, and Army Chief of Staff at the same time)
19		Wiranto	14 March 1998	21 May 1998	Development VII	(Note: Wiranto held the office concurrently as Minister of Defense and Security as well as Commander of the Armed Forces)
19		Wiranto	23 May 1998	20 October 1999	Development Reform	(Note: Wiranto held the office concurrently as Minister of Defense and Security as well as Commander of the Armed Forces)
20		Juwono Sudarsono	29 October 1999	26 August 2000	National Unity	(Note: The office were renamed 'Minister of Defense' (Menteri Pertahanan))
21		Mahfud MD	26 August 2000	20 July 2001	National Unity	
22		Agum Gumelar	20 July 2001	23 July 2001	National Unity	(Note: Gumelar held the post concurrently as Coordinating Minister of Political, Social, and Security Affairs, as well as Minister of Defense)
23		Matori Abdul Djalil	10 August 2001	20 October 2004	Mutual Assistance	
(20)		Juwono Sudarsono	21 October 2004	20 October 2009	United Indonesia I	
24		Purnomo Yusgiantoro	22 October 2009	20 October 2014	United Indonesia II	
25		Ryamizard Ryacudu	27 October 2014	20 October 2019	Working	
26		Prabowo Subianto	23 October 2019	20 October 2024	Onward Indonesia	
27		Sjafrie Sjamsoeddin	21 October 2024	Incumbent	Red and White	

Notes

Additional notes

- All ministers who served from the Third until Seventh Development cabinets are members of the Golkar Board of Supervisors, including the Commander of ABRI and Heads of government agencies

== See also ==
- Cabinet of Indonesia
- Ministry of Defense (Indonesia)
