= Susno Duadji =

Head of Indonesian National Police Criminal Investigation Agency (born 1954)

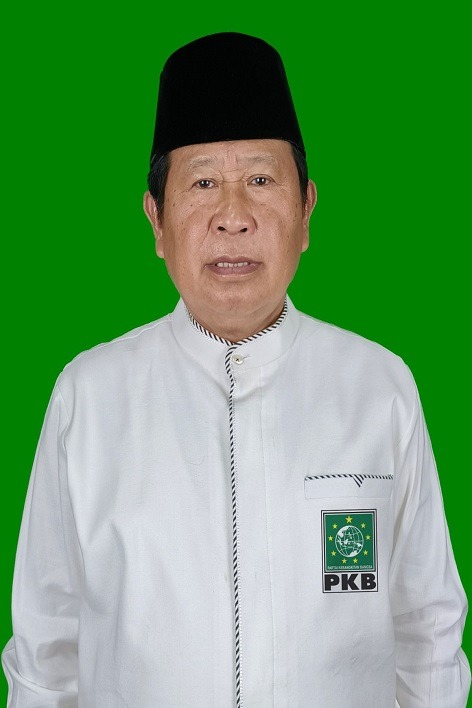

Criminal Investigation Agency
- In office 24 October 2008 – 30 November 2009
- President: Susilo Bambang Yudhoyono
- Preceded by: Komjen Pol Bambang Hendarso Danuri
- Succeeded by: Irjen Pol Ito Sumardi Djunisanyoto

West Java Regional Police
- In office 15 January 2008 – 24 October 2008
- Preceded by: Irjen Pol Soenarko Danu Ardanto
- Succeeded by: Irjen Pol Timur Pradopo

Personal details
- Born: July 1, 1954 (age 72) Pagar Alam, Sumatra Selatan, Indonesia
- Party: PBB
- Spouse: Herawati
- Education: AKABRI Police Section (1977)
- Occupation: Politician, Farmer

Military service
- Rank: Police Commissioner General

Susno Duadji (born 1 July 1954 in Pagar Alam, South Sumatera) is the former head of Indonesian National Police's Criminal Investigation Agency (Bareskrim) until his resignation on 5 November 2009. He was promoted to his last position in October 2008 after serving as Chief of Police in West Java Province for less than a year. He has a rank of Police Commissioner General (Komjen Pol.) - equivalent Lieutenant General in the military. His experiences include Chief of Police in Malang, in Madiun, both are in East Java Province, as well as Chief of Police in North Maluku.

== Controversies ==
Towards the end of his career in 2009, Duadji attracted headlines in Indonesian national media as a result of his alleged involvement in several high-profile corruption cases investigated by the Indonesian Corruption Eradication Commission (KPK). Once applauded for his anti-corruption stance during his tenure as West Java police chief, over time he became increasingly hostile to the activities of the KPK. According to his critics, he allegedly undermined anti-corruption efforts in Indonesia.

On one occasion Duadji met with one Anggoro Widjojo in Singapore at a time that Anggora Widjojo was wanted by KPK for his involvement in a corruption case. This accusation sparked rivalry between Indonesian National Police and the KPK leading to the arrest of two KPK leaders. This arrest in turn touched off a reaction among Indonesian activists due to their concern about moves to weaken the fight against corruption in Indonesia. Most Indonesians view the KPK as more credible than the Indonesian National Police or the Indonesian Attorney General Office in fighting corruption. Various high caliber cases, including the sentencing of Aulia Pohan, in-law of Susilo Bambang Yudhoyono, have enhanced the reputation of the KPK.
