= Hoegeng Iman Santoso =

5th Indonesian National Police Chief

Police-General (Ret.) Tan Sri Hoegeng Iman Santoso
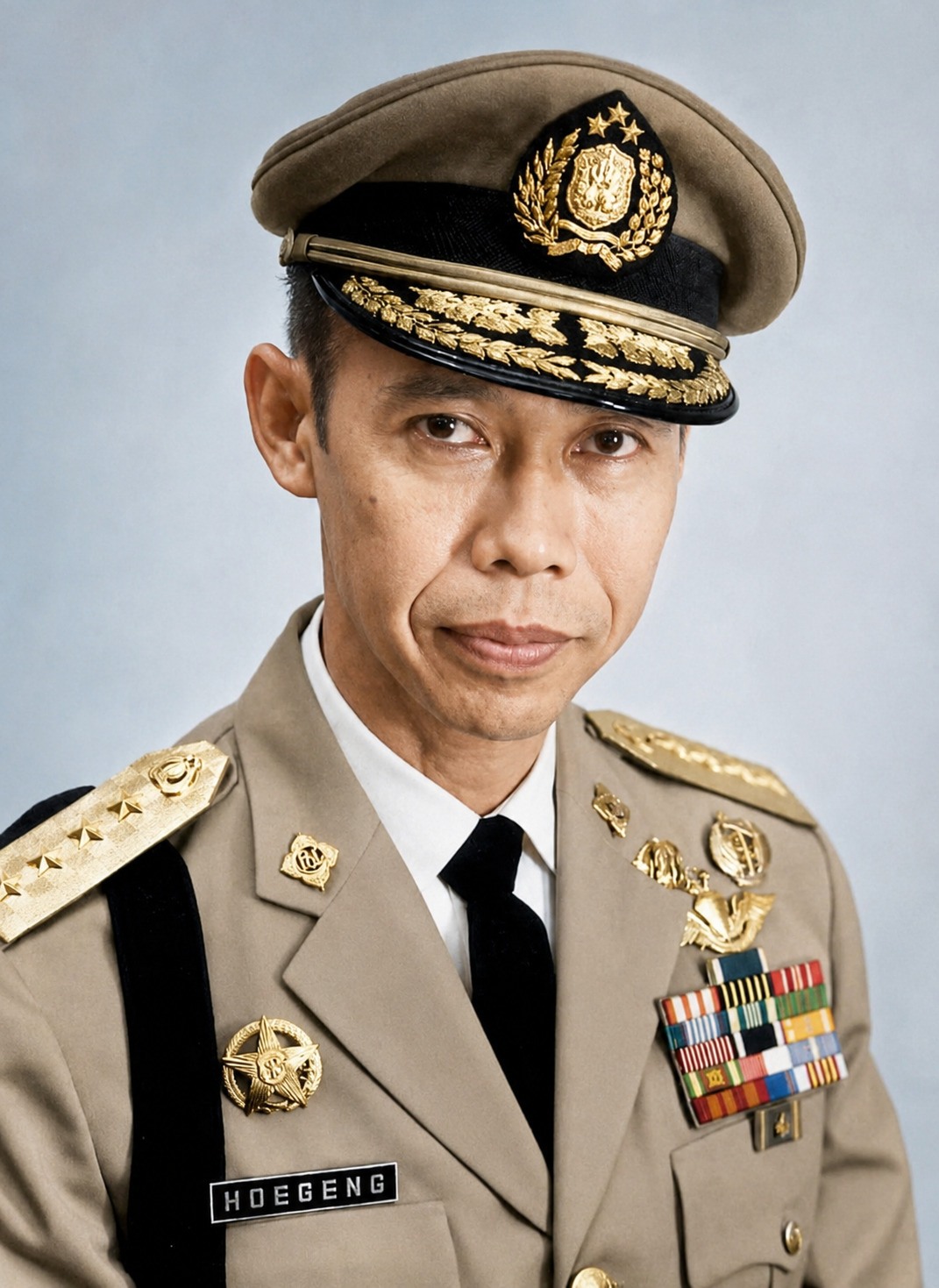
- Official Portrait, 1970

5th Chief of the Indonesian National Police Force
- In office 1 July 1969 – 2 October 1971
- President: Suharto
- Menhankam: Suharto
- Commander Indonesian Armed Forces: Suharto
- Preceded by: Hoegeng Iman Santoso (as Minister/Commander of the Police Force)
- Succeeded by: M. Hasan

5th Minister/Commander of the Indonesian National Police Force
- In office 9 May 1968 – 1 July 1969
- President: Suharto
- Preceded by: Soetjipto Joedodihardjo
- Succeeded by: Hoegeng Iman Santoso (as Chief of the National Police)

4th Director General of Immigration
- In office 19 January 1961 – 22 June 1966
- President: Sukarno
- Preceded by: Notohatyanto
- Succeeded by: Widikdo Soedikman

Personal details
- Born: 14 October 1922 Pekalongan, Central Java, Dutch East Indies
- Died: 14 July 2004 (aged 81) Jakarta, Indonesia
- Relatives: Kasino (nephew)
- Nickname: The Singing General

Military service
- Allegiance: Empire of Japan (1944–1945); Indonesia (1945–1971)
- Branch/service: Indonesian National Police
- Years of service: 1944–1970
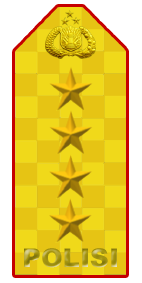
- Rank: Police General

Hoegeng (born Iman Santoso; 14 October 1922 – 14 July 2004) was the Chief of the Indonesian National Police from 1968 to 1970. Hoegeng is historically renowned for being the most courageous and honest police official in the nation, in a time when a majority of government officials were corrupt. He was well known for his constant acts and efforts to eradicate corruption and power play in Indonesian policing and promote equal criminal justice. Hoegeng had one of the briefest tenures as Chief of the Indonesian National Police.

== Biography ==
=== Early life and education ===
Hoegeng was born in Pekalongan on 14 October 1922. His birth name was Iman Santoso. The name "Hoegeng" was taken from the word "bugel" (to "bugeng" and then "hugeng"; which means fat) due to him being fat as a child. His father was Soekarjo Kario Hatmodjo from Tegal, a prosecutor in Pekalongan and his mother was Oemi Kalsoem. He had two younger sisters, Titi Soedjati and Soedjatmi. Hoegeng wanted to be a policeman because he was influenced by his father's friend Ating Natadikusumah, who was the chief of police in his hometown. Another law-related officer who was his father's friend was Soeprapto.

Hoegeng enrolled at Hollandsch-Inlandsche School (HIS; elementary school) Pekalongan and graduated in 1934. He then enrolled at Meer Uitgebreid Lager Onderwijs (MULO; middle school) in the same town and graduated three years later. He moved to Yogyakarta to continue his studies at Algemene Middelbare School (AMS; high school) majoring in Western languages and literature. While at AMS, Hoegeng befriended his senior Burhanuddin Harahap, his contemporary Soedarpo Sastrosatomo, and his juniors Usmar Ismail and Rosihan Anwar. In 1940, after graduating, he moved to Batavia to continue his studies at Recht Hoge School (RHS; law college), although some of his family members wanted him to enroll at Middlebare Opleiding School Voor Inlandsche Ambtenaren (MOSVIA; civil service college). There he was involved in a student organization named Unitas Studiosorum Indonesiensis (USI). In the organization, he met Soebadio Sastrosatomo, Subandrio, Oemar Senoadji, Chairul Saleh, and Hamid Algadrie.

In March 1942, Japan occupied the Dutch East Indies. Initially, Hoegeng felt relieved by the Japanese's arrival. But, then the Japanese military closed the RHS. Hoegeng then returned home in April; he used his free time to sell eggs and Japanese school books traveling from one city to another including Pati and Semarang with his friend Soehardjo Soerjobroto. In Semarang, he met his relative and was offered to work at Hoso Kyoku radio station. He was accepted and began to work one month later. While working at the station, he enrolled in a police course opening in Pekalongan. Hoegeng then applied and was accepted as one of eleven members of the police force out of 130 applicants.

He joined the Marshall General School in Military Police School, Fort Gordon, Georgia, United States.

=== Early career ===
Hoegeng originally felt disappointed as he found out that the output of the course was not for high-ranking officers (second inspector), but two ranks lower. However, he still went through it. While in the training, Hoegeng received 32 IDR per month, 19.50 IDR net. Every day after training, the cadets were assigned as regular police officers in the city. His colleagues, the trainers, and fellow cadets, later became prominent high-ranking officers including Soemarto, Soehardjo Soerjobroto, Soerojo, and Soedjono Partokoesoemo. After graduating from the course, Hoegeng was hesitant about whether to continue his career as a policeman or slightly turn as a judge. During that time, Soemarto, his trainer, registered Hoegeng for a police officer course in Sukabumi. Hoegeng then was accepted, even though he was not too serious at the selection, among six others from Pekalongan, an alumnus of the earlier course.

In Sukabumi, Hoegeng listed to Koto Kaisatsu Gakko course, a course for trained police. Before graduation, Hoegeng and his friends thought that they would be promoted to a higher rank Junsabucho, instead their rank was to be lowered to Minarai Junsabucho. They protested heavily the decision until General Kumakichi Harada of the Sixteenth Army visited the place to calm them down. In 1944, Hoegeng graduated and with his three friends, Soetrisno, Noto Darsono, and Soenarto were assigned to Chiang Bu (security department) of Semarang. Hoegeng and Soenarto held the Koto Kei Satsuka (intelligence division) post, while Noto and Soetrisno respectively were given positions at Keimu Ka (general affairs) and Keiza Ka (economic affairs). After several weeks in Semarang, Hoegeng was promoted to Kei Bu Ho II. In several months, Hoegeng was promoted to Kei Bu Ho I. Shortly before the Japanese surrender to Allied forces, Hoegeng was reassigned to Keibi Ka Cho (custody division) under the leadership of R. Soekarno Djojonegoro and was promoted again.

One day after the Proclamation of Indonesian Independence, Soeprapto, a friend of Hoegeng's father, gathered local police officers, including Hoegeng and his superior Soekarno Djojonegoro, and told them about the independence of Indonesia and that there was to be a transfer of power. In October, Hoegeng was admitted to a hospital (now Dr. Kariadi Hospital) in Semarang after suffering a concussion during his duty guarding Japanese prisoners. At that time, the Five Days Battle between Indonesian fighters and Japanese prisoners occurred. In the morning before the hospital was stormed by the Japanese, Hoegeng fled because he didn't like the hospital atmosphere. After the battle began to cease, Hoegeng was recommended by a doctor to rest. He then took leave and rested in Pekalongan.

While in Pekalongan, Hoegeng was visited by Commodore M. Nazir who was later to be the first Navy's chief of staff. Nazir was interested in Hoegeng because he wanted to establish the navy's military police and offered the Hoegoen to be a part of the navy. Hoegeng then accepted the offer mainly because he wanted a challenge as the police force was already well-established. Given the rank of Major, he was given the right to live at Hotel Merdeka, Yogyakarta, and paid 400 IDR per month. Under the leadership of Lieutenant Colonel Darwis, Commander of Navy Base in Tegal, his first duty was to formulate the basic foundation of the military police which was, at the beginning, named Penyelidik Militer Laut Khusus (PMLC; special navy investigator) unit. During his stay in the hotel, Hoegeng was persuaded by Soekanto Tjokrodiatmodjo, the chief of police, to rejoin the police force. In Yogyakarta, Hoegeng had another activity as a main character of a radio play Saija dan Adinda broadcast by Angkatan Laoet, Darat, dan Oedara radio (ALDO; navy, land, and air forces) and RRI Yogyakarta. He later married Meriyati Roeslani, his counterpart in the play who was born in 1925, on 31 October 1946 in Jetis, Yogyakarta. After they married, Hoegeng resigned as the navy officer to pursue his childhood dream of becoming a police officer. They had a son, Aditya Soetanto Hoegeng, and two daughters, Sri Pamujining Rahayu, and Renny Soerjanti Hoegeng, who was the ex-wife of actor Rudy Wowor.

=== Indonesian independence and occupation by the Dutch ===
After rejoining, Hoegeng was listed as a student of Akademi Kepolisian (Police Academy) in Mertoyudan, Magelang. During his vacation in the middle of 1947, Hoegeng and his wife, who was pregnant, visited his family in Pekalongan. However, on 21 July the Dutch military conducted a military operation. Hoegeng and his family then fled to the south of the town. Hoegeng was told by Soekarno Djojonegoro, chief of police of Pekalongan, that Soekanto had ordered all of the students of the academy to help the local police department. Hoegeng's duty at that time was collecting intelligence material. Later, he was arrested by police officers working for the Netherlands Indies Civil Administration (NICA). While arrested, Hoegeng was treated well, unlike the others. He eventually found out that the one who gave the order was de Bretonniere, his friend in RHS. Hoegeng was persuaded to work for NICA but refused. After three weeks, he was released. Hoegeng then decided to visit the commando of Yogyakarta. He, his wife, and his parents went to Jakarta at first. In Jakarta, Hoegeng met Soemarto who was a deputy chief police at that time, and was asked to be the latter's subordinate. Hoegeng accepted but wanted to visit Yogyakarta. He was helped by Soemarto and left his wife and went alone in September. In Yogyakarta, Hoegeng reported his duty to Soekanto and requested permission as Soemarto's subordinate in Jakarta; Soekanto gave permission. In November, Hoegeng worked as Soemarto's assistant and was given the duty to observe Indonesian political prisoners and help them if possible. In Jakarta, he corresponded with Sudirman, Hamengkubuwono IX, Oerip Soemohardjo, Suryadi Suryadarma, and M. Nazir.

He was Chief of the DPKN police office in Surabaya, East Java in 1952. He became the chief of BARESKRIM in Medan, North Sumatra in 1956. In 1959, he followed the Mobile Brigade (BRIMOB) training school and became a directorate staff II In 1960, he became the chief of the Immigration & customs in 1960, became Minister of Economics in 1965 During the Dwikora Cabinet, and became the Cabinet Secretary in the Second Revised Dwikora Cabinet in 1966. After Hoegeng resigned as the police chief, he performed on TVRI playing Hawaiian guitar together with "The Hawaiian Seniors" band and hosted The Hawaiian Seniors music show (originally Irama Lautan Teduh) from 1968 until 1979. He occasionally performed with his wife, Merry Hoegeng, and his daughter, Reny Hoegeng or Aditya Hoegeng.

== Honours ==

First row	Bintang Mahaputera Utama (14 Agustus 2004)		Bintang Gerilya
Second row	Bintang Dharma	Bintang Bhayangkara Utama	Bintang Kartika Eka Paksi Utama
Third row	Bintang Jalasena Utama	Bintang Swa Bhuwana Paksa Utama	Satyalancana Peringatan Perjuangan Kemerdekaan
Fourth row	Satyalancana Satya Dasawarsa	Satyalancana Jana Utama	Satyalancana Ksatriya Tamtama
Fifth row	Satyalancana Prasetya Pancawarsa	Satyalancana Perang Kemerdekaan I	Satyalancana Perang Kemerdekaan II
Sixth row	Satyalancana G.O.M I	Satyalancana Sapta Marga	Satyalancana Penegak
Seventh row	Knight Grand Cross of the Most Noble Order of the Crown of Thailand - Thailand	Knight Grand Cross of the Order of Orange-Nassau - Belanda	Panglima Setia Mahkota (P.S.M.) - Malaysia

== Bibliography ==
- Santoso, Aris; Sutrisno, Ery; Sirait, Hasudungan; Hasibuan, Imran (2009). Hoegeng: Oase Menyejukkan di Tengah Perilaku Koruptif para Pemimpin Bangsa [Hoegeng: soothing oasis in the middle of the leaders of the nation's corrupt behavior]. Yogyakarta: Bentang. ISBN 978-979-1227-65-0.
- Santoso, Aris; Sutrisno, Ery; Sirait, Hasudungan; Hasibuan, Imran (2014). Hoegeng: Oase di Tengah Keringnya Penegakan Hukum di Indonesia. Yogyakarta: Bentang Pustaka. ISBN 9786027888005.
