= Greater Jakarta Metropolitan Regional Police =

Indonesian National Police, Greater Jakarta Metropolitan Region Kepolisian Negara Republik Indonesia Daerah Metropolitan Jakarta Raya
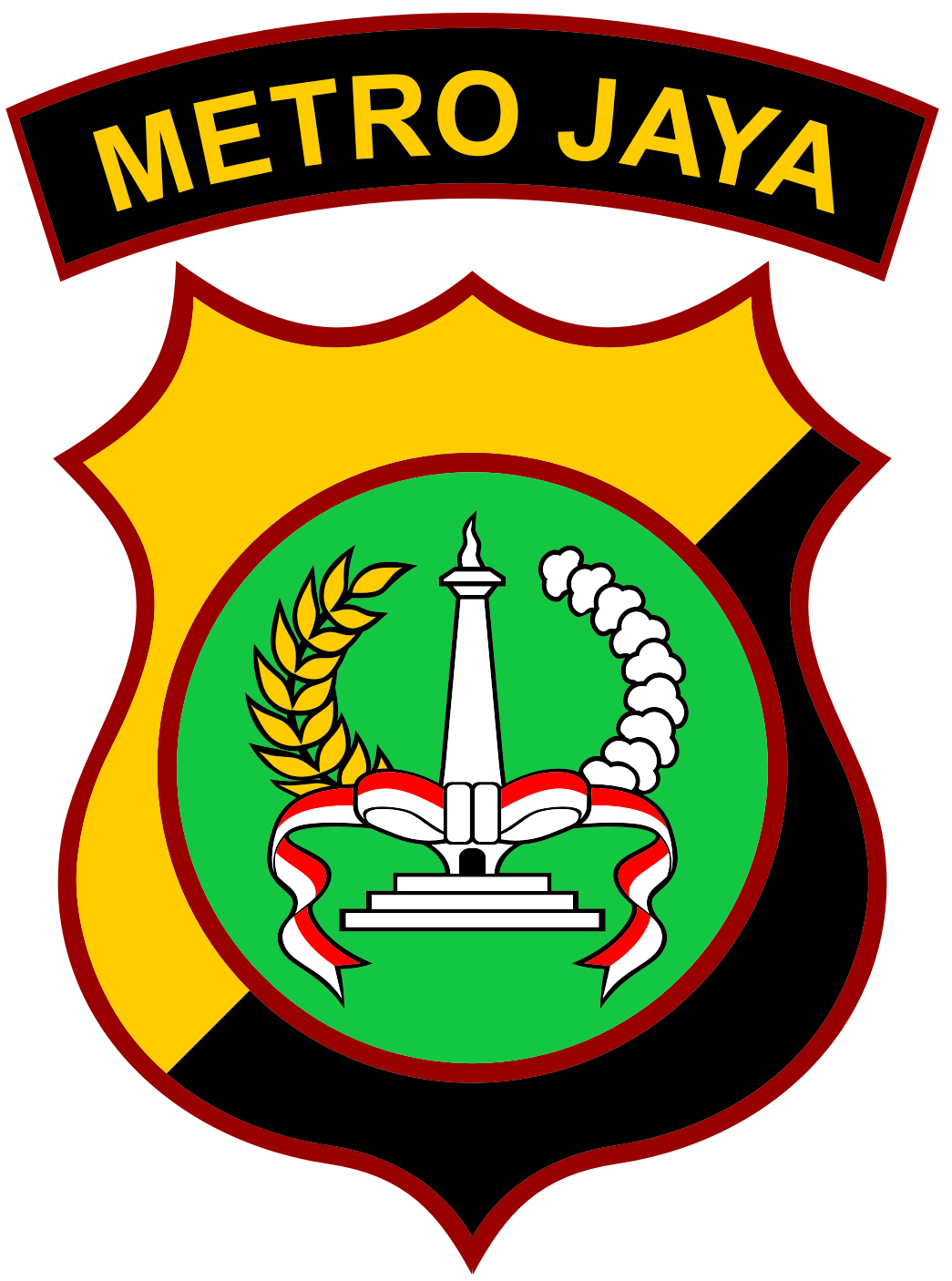
- Logo of the PMJ
- Abbreviation: Polda Metro Jaya; PMJ

Jurisdictional structure
- National agency (Operations jurisdiction): Indonesia
- Operations jurisdiction: Indonesia
- Legal jurisdiction: Jakarta and its surrounding areas of Jabodetabek except Bogor, Bogor Regency, and Tangerang Regency
- Governing body: Government of Indonesia

Operational structure
- Headquarters: Jl. Jenderal Sudirman Kav. 55, Senayan, Kebayoran Baru, South Jakarta
- Agency executives: Pol. Gen Asep Edi Suheri, S.I.K., M.Si., Chief of Metropolitan Regional Police; Brigjen Pol. Dekananto Eko Purwono, S.I.K., M.H., Deputy Chief of Metropolitan Regional Police
- Parent agency: Indonesian National Police

Website
- www.metro.polri.go.id

The Greater Jakarta Metropolitan Region of the Indonesian National Police (Indonesian: Kepolisian Negara Republik Indonesia Daerah Metropolitan Jakarta Raya), known locally as Polda Metro Jaya, is the regional level of the Indonesian National Police which covers nearly the entire Jakarta metropolitan area, comprising Jakarta, Tangerang, South Tangerang, Bekasi, Bekasi Regency, and Depok. Polda Metro Jaya is led by a local police chief who held the Rank of Inspector General of Police. Polda Metro Jaya is the only regional police in Indonesia which has the A+ Status due to its position to maintain a huge area of security and order in the capital of Indonesia (Jakarta) containing multiple regions and cities that surround the capital. The use of the word "Metropolitan" is because Jakarta is a metropolitan city.

== Jurisdiction ==
Below are the departamental police commands (Polres) which are all under the command of the Greater Jakarta Metropolitan Regional Police, covering a regency/city level:

=== Inside Jakarta ===
- Central Jakarta Metropolitan Police, located in Jl. Garuda No.2, Kemayoran
- North Jakarta Metropolitan Police, located in Jl. Yos Sudarso No.1, Koja
- West Jakarta Metropolitan Police, located in Jl. Letjen S. Parman No.31, Palmerah
- South Jakarta Metropolitan Police, located in Jl. Wijaya II No.42, Kebayoran Baru
- East Jakarta Metropolitan Police, located in Jl. Matraman Raya No.224, Jatinegara
- Tanjung Priok Harbour Police, located in Jl. Pelabuhan Nusantara II No.1, Tanjung Priok, North Jakarta
- Thousand Islands Police, located in Panggang Island

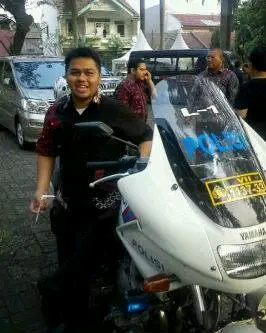
one of the official motorbikes Greater Jakarta Regional Metropolitan Police member

=== Outside Jakarta ===
- Tangerang City Metropolitan Police, located in Jl. Raya Daan Mogot No.52, Tangerang District.
- Soekarno–Hatta International Airport Police, located in Jl. C3 No.641, Benda, Tangerang.
- South Tangerang Metropolitan Police, located in Jl. Promoter No.1, Serpong.
- Bekasi City Metropolitan Police, located in Jl. Pramuka No.79, South Bekasi
- Bekasi Metropolitan Police, located in Jl. Ki Hajar Dewantara No.1, North Cikarang
- Depok Metropolitan Police, located in Jl. Margonda Raya No.14, Pancoran Mas

== List of Chiefs ==
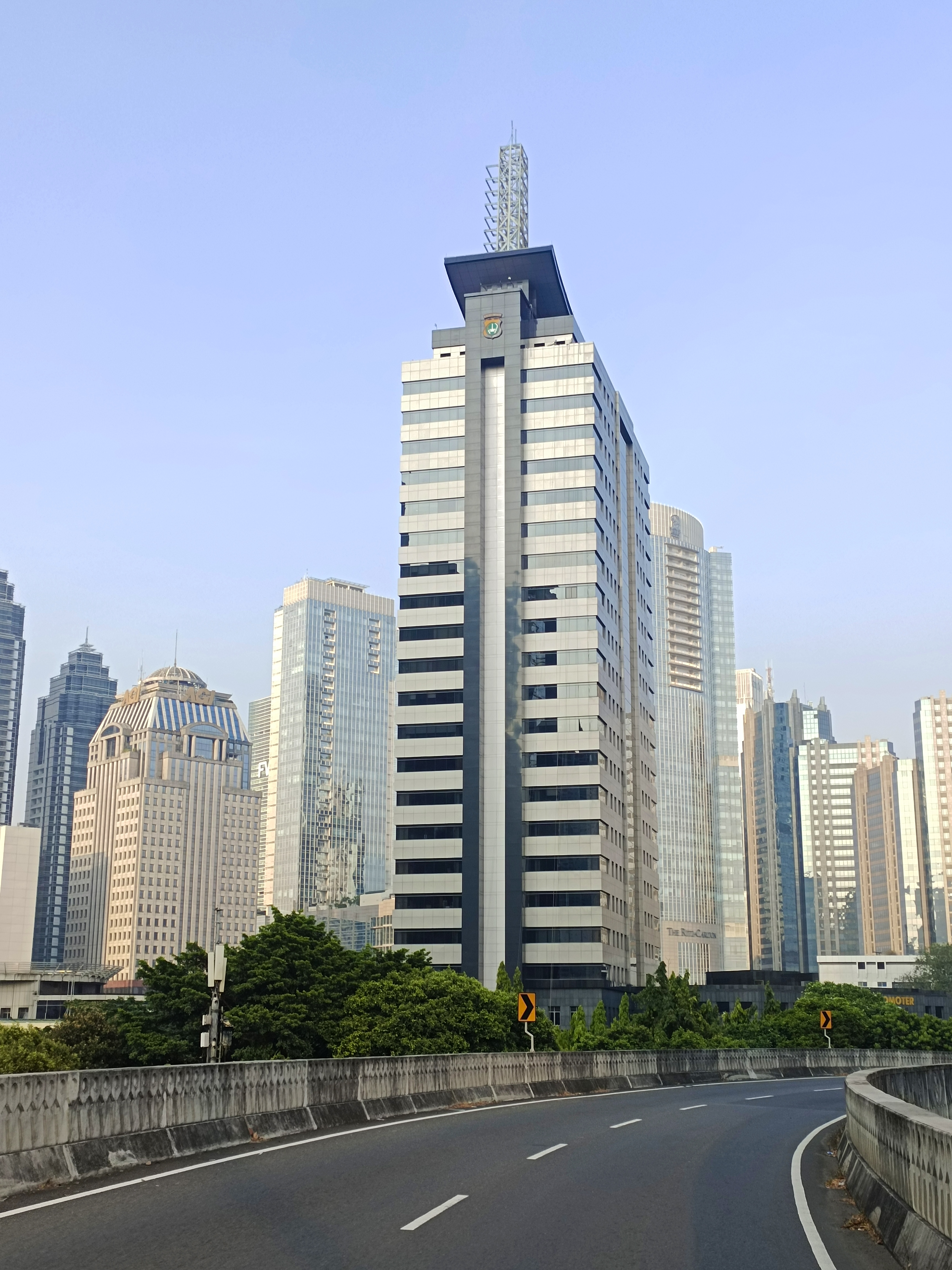
Polda Metro Jaya Headquarters

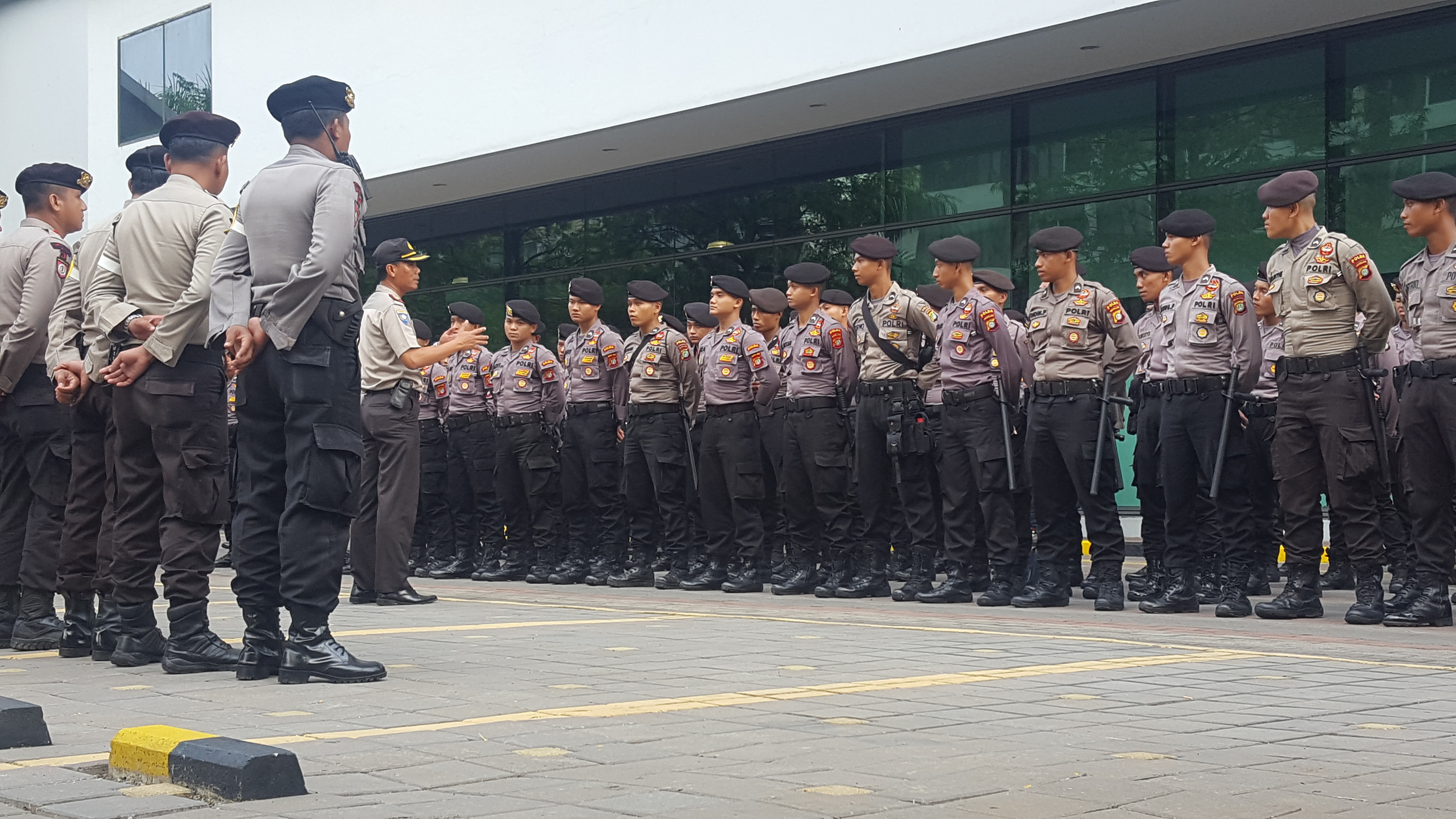
Polda Metro Jaya police personnel

Down here is the list of officials that have ever sat as the chief of the Metropolitan Police. They are called Kapolda Metro Jaya or simply Kapolda.

| No. | Rank and Name | Came to Office | End Office |
|---|---|---|---|
| 1 | Police Chief Commissioner; R. Ating Natadikusuma | 6 December 1949 | 30 December 1952 |
| 2 | Police Chief Commissioner; M. Suro Pranoto | 30 December 1952 | 6 July 1961 |
| 3 | Brigadier General Police; M. Suhud | 6 July 1961 | 29 February 1964 |
| 4 | Brigadier General Police; T. A. Azis | 29 February 1964 | 3 June 1965 |
| 5 | Brigadier General Police; R. Sarno Tjokrodiningrat | 3 June 1965 | 3 November 1965 |
| 6 | Major General Police; Soebroto Brotodiredjo | 3 November 1965 | 7 December 1967 |
| 7 | Major General Police; Soekahar | 7 December 1967 | 16 February 1970 |
| 8 | Major General Police; Widodo Budidarmo | 16 February 1970 | 25 June 1974 |
| 9 | Major General Police; Soetadi Ronodipuro | 1974 | 1977 |
| 10 | Major General Police; Kodrat Samadikoen | 1977 | 1978 |
| 11 | Major General Police; Anton Soedjarwo | 1978 | 1983 |
| 12 | Major General Police; R. Soedjoko | 8 December 1983 | 25 October 1984 |
| 13 | Major General Police; Soedarmadji | 25 October 1984 | 17 June 1986 |
| 14 | Major General Police; M. Poedy Sjamsoedin | 17 June 1986 | 20 September 1989 |
| 15 | Major General Police; M.H. Ritonga | 20 September 1989 | 22 August 1992 |
| 16 | Major General Police; Banurusman Astrosemitro | 22 August 1992 | 31 March 1993 |
| 17 | Major General Police; M. Hindarto | 31 March 1993 | 17 January 1995 |
| 18 | Major General; Dibyo Widodo | 17 January 1995 | 19 March 1996 |
| 19 | Major General Police; Hamami Nata | 19 March 1996 | 17 January 1998 |
| 20 | Major General Police; Noegroho Djajoesman | 1998 | 1999 |
| 21 | Major General Police; Nurfaizi Suawandi | 1999 | 2000 |
| 22 | Inspector General Police; Mulyono Sulaiman | 2000 | 2001 |
| 23 | Inspector General Police; M. Sofjan Jacoeb | 2001 | 18 December 2001 |
| 24 | Inspector General Police; R. Makbul Padmanagara | 18 December 2001 | 16 July 2004 |
| 25 | Inspector General Police; Firman Gani | 16 July 2004 | 20 June 2006 |
| 26 | Inspector General Police; Adang Firman | 20 June 2006 | 18 December 2008 |
| 27 | Inspector General Police; Wahyono | 18 December 2008 | 18 June 2010 |
| 28 | Inspector General Police; Timur Pradopo | 18 June 2010 | 7 October 2010 |
| 29 | Inspector General Police; Sutarman | 7 October 2010 | 11 July 2011 |
| 30 | Inspector General Police; Untung Suharsono Radjab | 11 July 2011 | 31 October 2012 |
| 31 | Inspector General Police; Putut Eko Baku Seno | 31 October 2011 | 18 March 2014 |
| 32 | Inspector General Police; Dwi Priyatno | 18 March 2014 | 5 September 2014 |
| 33 | Inspector General Police; Unggung Cahyono | 5 September 2014 | 12 June 2015 |
| 34 | Inspector General Police; M. Tito Karnavian | 12 June 2015 | 21 March 2016 |
| 35 | Inspector General Police; Moechgiyarto | 21 March 2016 | 16 September 2016 |
| 36 | Inspector General Police; Mochamad Iriawan | 16 September 2016 | 20 July 2017 |
| 37 | Inspector General Police; Idham Azis | 20 July 2017 | 22 January 2019 |
| 37 | Inspector General Police; Gatot Eddy Pramono | 22 January 2019 | 7 January 2020 |
| 38 | Inspector General Police; Nana Sujana | 7 January 2020 | 16 November 2020 |
| 39 | Inspector General Police; M. Fadil Imran | 16 November 2020 | 27 March 2023 |
| 40 | Inspector General Police; Karyoto | 27 March 2023 | Incumbent |
