= Idham Azis =

Indonesian police general

Police-General Idham Azis
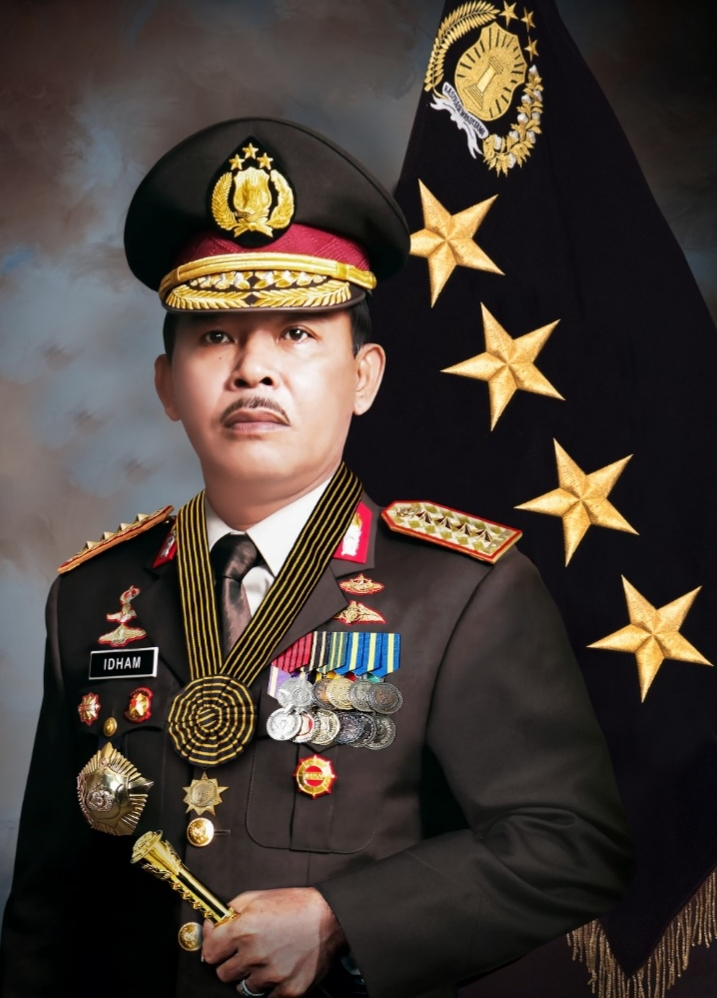

24th Chief of the Indonesian National Police
- In office 1 November 2019 – 27 January 2021
- President: Joko Widodo
- Preceded by: Tito Karnavian; Ari Dono Sukmanto (Acting)
- Succeeded by: Listyo Sigit Prabowo

Chief of Bareskrim
- In office 22 January 2019 – 1 November 2019
- Preceded by: Arief Sulistyanto
- Succeeded by: Listyo Sigit Prabowo

Chief of Jakarta Police
- In office 20 July 2017 – 22 January 2019

Personal details
- Born: 30 January 1963 (age 63) Kendari, Southeast Sulawesi, Indonesia
- Police career
- Allegiance: Indonesia
- Branch: Indonesian National Police
- Service years: 1988–2021
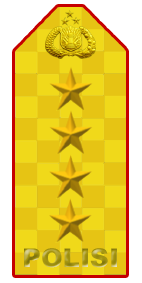
- Rank: Police-General

Idham Azis (born 30 January 1963) is an Indonesian police general. He was the Chief of the Indonesian National Police, having served from November 2019 until January 2021. Originating from Kendari, he began his career in the police force in 1988, and participated in several counter-terrorism operations before holding several high-ranking posts as the Chief of the Greater Jakarta Metropolitan Regional Police and the Criminal Investigation Agency.

== Early life and education ==
Azis was born on 30 January 1963 in the Kampung Salo neighborhood of Kendari, Southeast Sulawesi as the second child of five, and he completed the first twelve years of his education in Kendari's state schools before attempting to enroll in the Police Academy. He was rejected the first time, and he enrolled in the Faculty of Agriculture at the Haluoleo University, but he reapplied to the Police Academy, and he was accepted at his third application. He graduated from the academy as part of the class of 1988.

== Career ==
He began his career as a police officer in the Bandung City Police, where he held several posts and positions until 1999 when he was moved to the Jakarta Metropolitan Police. By 2004, he was deputy chief police officer for West Jakarta, and later was reassigned to Central Sulawesi. In 2005, he joined Densus 88 and soon afterwards took part in a counter-terrorism police raid which resulted in the death of Azahari Husin. He was given a special promotion for his part. He also investigated the 2005 beheadings of three Christian girls in Poso.

Afterwards, he held several more posts in the Criminal Investigation Agency (Bareskrim), rejoining the Jakarta Police and becoming the Chief of Police for West Jakarta in 2008. In 2010, he was deputy chief of the Densus, with Tito Karnavian as the chief. He was promoted to police brigadier general after the conclusion of his time as deputy chief, when he was again moved to Bareskrim. He was the Chief of Police in Central Sulawesi for some time, among other positions, before he was appointed to be Chief of Jakarta Police in 2017. On 22 January 2019, he was appointed Chief of Bareskrim, with his rank at that time being an inspector general (two-star).

=== Chief of National Police ===
Following the appointment of Tito as the Minister of Home Affairs, Azis was appointed and sworn in as Chief of National Police on 1 November 2019. As part of his appointment, he was promoted to a four-star police general.
