= Timur Pradopo =

Chief of National Police of Indonesia from 2010 to 2013

Police-General (Ret.) Timur Pradopo
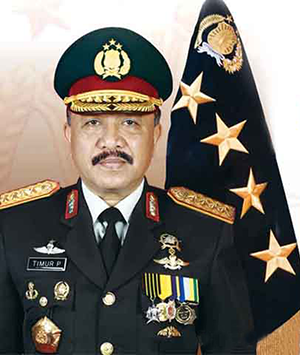

20th Chief of National Police of Indonesia
- In office 22 October 2010 – 25 October 2013
- President: Susilo Bambang Yudhoyono
- Preceded by: Bambang Hendarso Danuri
- Succeeded by: Sutarman

Personal details
- Born: 10 January 1955 (age 71) Jombang, East Java, Indonesia
- Spouse: Irianti Sari Andayani
- Children: Moh. Bimo Aryo Seto Dhea Istighfarina Miranti

General Police (Ret.) Timur Pradopo (born 10 January 1955), DUBC was Chief of the Indonesian National Police (Kapolri) from 22 October 2010 until 25 October 2013. Timur Pradopo replaced Chief of Police General Bambang Hendarso Danuri who was relieved of duty. He was nominated by Indonesian President Susilo Bambang Yudhoyono.

His deputy chief was Jusuf Manggabarani.

== Career history ==
1. Chief of West Jakarta District Metro Police
2. Chief of Central Jakarta District Metro Police
3. Operation Bureau Chief of West Java Regional Police
4. Chief of Bandung Metropolis Police
5. Development Corps Youth and Students of Directorate of Youth and Training
6. Regional Supervising Inspector of Bali Regional Police (2004–2005)
7. Chief of Banten Regional Police (2005–2008)
8. Advanced Principal Officers Police Education and Training Institutions (2008)
9. Social and Politic Expert Staff of Chief of National Police of Indonesia (2008)
10. Chief of West Java Regional Police (2008–2010)
11. Chief of Greater Jakarta Metropolitan Regional Police (2010)
12. Head of the Police Security Sustainer (2010)
13. Chief of National Police of Indonesia (2010–2013)

Military offices
Preceded by Bambang Hendarso Danuri	Chief of National Police of Indonesia; 2010–2013	Succeeded by Sutarman
Preceded by Iman Haryatna	Head of the Police Security Sustainer; 2010	Succeeded by Fajar Prihantoro
Preceded by Wahyono	Chief of Greater Jakarta Metropolitan Regional Police; 2010	Succeeded by Sutarman
Preceded by Susno Duadji	Chief of West Java Regional Police; 2008–2010	Succeeded by Sutarman
Preceded by Budi Gunawan	Advanced Principal Officers; Police Education and Training Institutions; 2008	Succeeded by Sutarman
Preceded by Badrodin Haiti	Chief of Banten Regional Police; 2005–2008	Succeeded by Rumiah Kartoredjo
