= Chief of the Indonesian National Police =

- Kepala Kepolisian Republik Indonesia
- Insignia of Polri

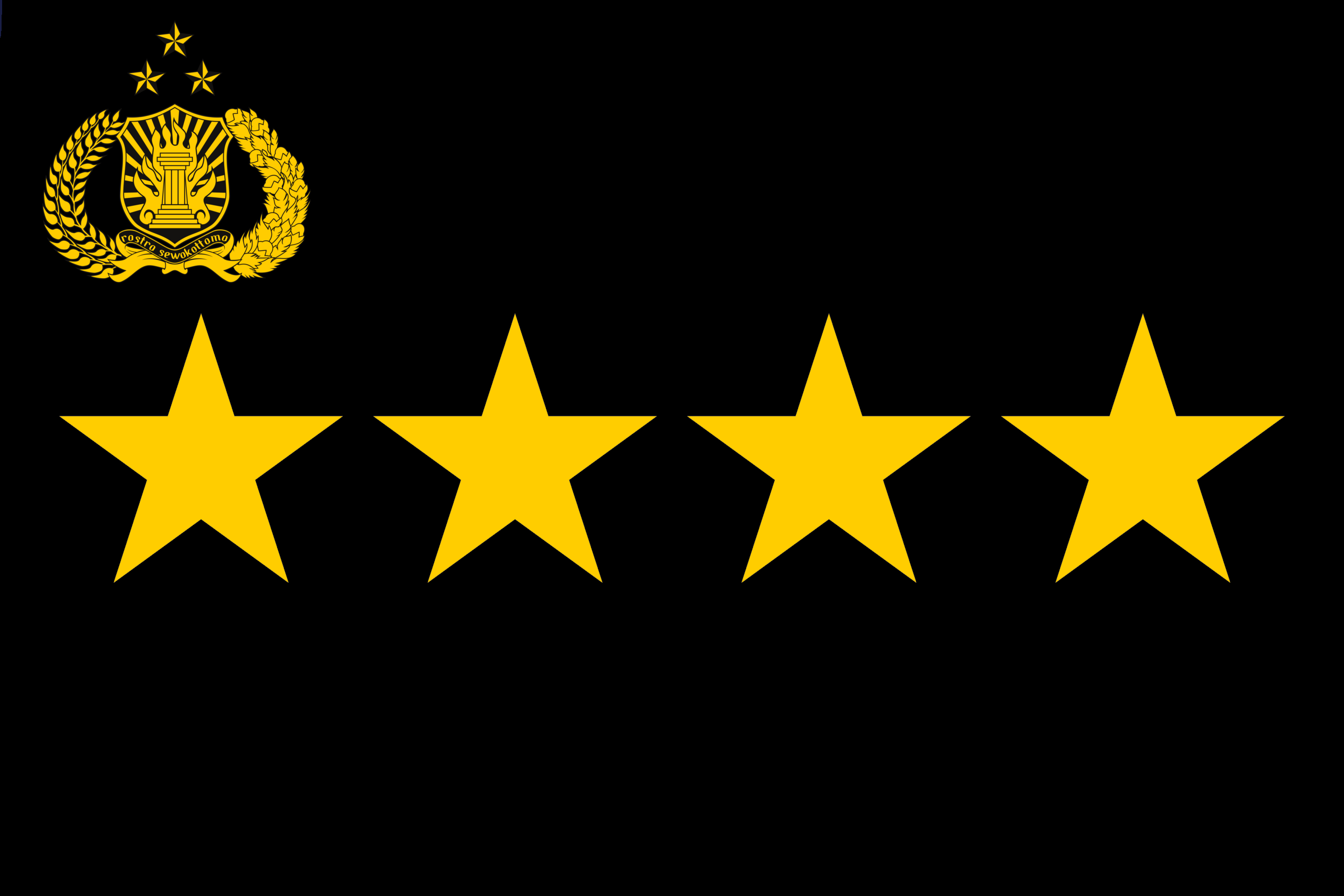
- Flag of the chief

- Incumbent; Police General Suyudi Ario Seto since 1 October 2026
- Indonesian National Police
- Style: Kapolri
- Member of: Cabinet
- Reports to: President of Indonesia
- Residence: Kebayoran Baru - Jakarta
- Seat: Indonesian National Police Headquarter, Kebayoran Baru - Jakarta
- Nominator: The president
- Appointer: The president with Parliament consent
- Term length: up to mandatory retirement age or as per president's decision
- Constituting instrument: Law No. 2/2002 concerning the State Police of the Republic of Indonesia
- Precursor: Chief of the Criminal Investigation Agency (Bareskrim Polri)
- Formation: 1945
- First holder: Police General Said Soekanto Tjokrodiatmodjo
- Unofficial names: Truno 1 / Tribrata 1 / TB 1
- Deputy: Deputy Chief of the Indonesian National Police
- Website: https://www.polri.go.id/

The chief of the Indonesian National Police (Indonesian: Kepala Kepolisian Negara Republik Indonesia), commonly known as the national police chief (Kapolri), is the official who heads the Indonesian National Police.

Since it was first formed, this position has experienced several changes in hierarchy and position names. In the Old Order era, this position had undergone several name changes (such as Men/Pangak, or Minister/Commander of the Police Force as then-member of the cabinet) and in the New Order era the position of the Chief of Police in a hierarchy was under the ABRI Commander.

== History ==
On 19 August 1945 the Preparatory Committee for Indonesian Independence (PPKI) formed the National Police Agency (BKN). On 29 September 1945 President Sukarno appointed Raden Said Soekanto Tjokrodiatmodjo to become the Chief of the National Police (KKN).

Initially the police were within the Ministry of Internal Affairs under the name Djawatan National Police which was only responsible for administrative matters, while operational issues were accountable to the Attorney General.

Starting from 1 July 1946, the position was directly responsible to the Prime Minister.

In the country of the United States of Indonesia, the Bureau of State Police of the United States of Indonesia was under the Prime Minister through the mediation of the Attorney General in the political and operational fields. Meanwhile, in terms of maintenance and administrative arrangements, the Minister of Home Affairs is responsible. The United States of Indonesia President Sukarno on 21 January 1950 reappointed Soekanto Tjokrodiatmodjo as Chief of the Bureau of Police of the United States of Indonesia. After RIS broke up, Soekanto was reappointed Head of the Indonesian Police Service Bureau.

In 1961, the State Police became part of the armed forces. In 1962 the position of head of the police department was changed to Minister / Head of State Police, and was changed again to Minister / Chief of Staff of the National Police Force. During the Dwikora Cabinet the position of National Police Chief was changed to become Minister / Commander-in-Chief of the Police Force.

After the reorganization of ABRI in 1970, it again became the Head of the Indonesian National Police (Kapolri), which was under the command of the Commander of the Armed Forces of the Republic of Indonesia (ABRI Commander).

Since 1 April 1999, the Indonesian National Police were separated from the Indonesian Armed Forces from ABRI and became independent. Upon election, the President could receive recommendation nominees from the National Police Commission (Kompolnas) and send his/her preferred candidate(s) to the House of Representatives for approval. Nominees are usually active three-star police generals (Commissioner General rank, such as Chief of Investigation Body, Vice Chief of National Police, Chief of Terrorism Eradication Body, etc.).

The National Police Chief is elected by the President based on the approval of the House of Representatives and is directly responsible to the President.

== List of holders ==
No.	Portrait	Chief of Indonesian National Police	Took office	Left office	Time in office
1	Said Soekanto Tjokrodiatmodjo	Police General; Said Soekanto Tjokrodiatmodjo (1908–1993); Police Lieutenant General when became Chief	29 September 1945	14 December 1958	13 years, 76 days
2	Soekarno Djojonegoro	Police General; Soekarno Djojonegoro (1908–1975); Police Lieutenant General when became Chief	15 December 1958	29 December 1963	5 years, 14 days
3	Soetjipto Danoekoesoemo	Police Major General; Soetjipto Danoekoesoemo (1922–1998)	30 December 1963	8 May 1965	1 year, 129 days
4	Soetjipto Joedodihardjo	Police Lieutenant General; Soetjipto Joedodihardjo (1917–1984)	9 May 1965	15 May 1968	3 years, 6 days
5	Hoegeng Iman Santoso	Police Lieutenant General; Hoegeng Iman Santoso (1922–2004)	15 May 1968	2 October 1970	2 years, 140 days
6	Mohamad Hasan	Police Lieutenant General; Mohamad Hasan (1920–2005)	3 October 1970	24 June 1976	5 years, 265 days
7	Widodo Budidarmo	Police Lieutenant General; Widodo Budidarmo (1927–2017)	26 June 1976	24 September 1978	2 years, 90 days
8	Awaluddin Djamin	Police Lieutenant General; Awaluddin Djamin (1927–2019)	26 September 1978	3 December 1983	4 years, 68 days
9	Anton Soedjarwo	Police General; Anton Soedjarwo (1930–1988)	4 December 1983	6 June 1986	1 year, 184 days
10	Mochammad Sanoesi	Police General; Mochammad Sanoesi (1935–2008)	7 June 1986	19 February 1991	5 years, 257 days
11	Kunarto	Police General; Kunarto (1940–2011)	20 February 1991	5 April 1993	2 years, 44 days
12	Banurusman Astrosemitro	Police General; Banurusman Astrosemitro (1941–2012); Police Lieutenant General when became Chief	6 April 1993	14 March 1996	2 years, 343 days
13	Dibyo Widodo	Police General; Dibyo Widodo (1946–2012)	15 March 1996	28 June 1998	2 years, 105 days
14	Roesmanhadi	Police General; Roesmanhadi (born 1944)	29 June 1998	3 January 2000	1 year, 197 days
15	Roesdihardjo	Police General; Roesdihardjo (born 1945)	4 January 2000	22 September 2000	262 days
16	Surojo Bimantoro	Police General; Surojo Bimantoro (born 1946)	23 September 2000	29 November 2002	2 years, 67 days
—	Chairuddin Ismail	Police Commissioner General; Chairuddin Ismail (born 1947); Acting	21 July 2001	3 August 2002	1 year, 13 days
17	Da'i Bachtiar	Police General; Da'i Bachtiar (born 1949)	29 November 2002	7 July 2005	2 years, 220 days
18	Sutanto	Police General; Sutanto (born 1950)	8 July 2005	30 September 2008	3 years, 84 days
19	Bambang Hendarso Danuri	Police General; Bambang Hendarso Danuri (born 1952)	1 October 2008	22 October 2010	2 years, 21 days
20	Timur Pradopo	Police General; Timur Pradopo (born 1955)	22 October 2010	25 October 2013	3 years, 3 days
21	Sutarman	Police General; Sutarman (born 1957)	25 October 2013	16 January 2015	1 year, 83 days
—	Badrodin Haiti	Police Commissioner General; Badrodin Haiti (born 1958); Acting	16 January 2015	17 April 2015	91 days
22	Badrodin Haiti	Police General; Badrodin Haiti (born 1958)	17 April 2015	13 July 2016	1 year, 87 days
23	Tito Karnavian	Police General; Tito Karnavian (born 1964)	13 July 2016	22 October 2019	3 years, 101 days
—	Ari Dono Sukmanto	Police Commissioner General; Ari Dono Sukmanto (born 1961); Acting	22 October 2019	1 November 2019	9 days
24	Idham Azis	Police General; Idham Azis (born 1963)	1 November 2019	27 January 2021	1 year, 87 days
25	Listyo Sigit Prabowo	Police General; Listyo Sigit Prabowo (born 1969)	27 January 2021	1 October 2026	5 years, 247 days
26	Suyudi Ario Seto	Police General; Suyudi Ario Seto (born 1973)	1 October 2026	Incumbent	34 days

== See also ==
- Indonesian National Police
