= Widodo Budidarmo =

Indonesian National Police Chief

Police-General (Ret.) Tan Sri Widodo Budidarmo
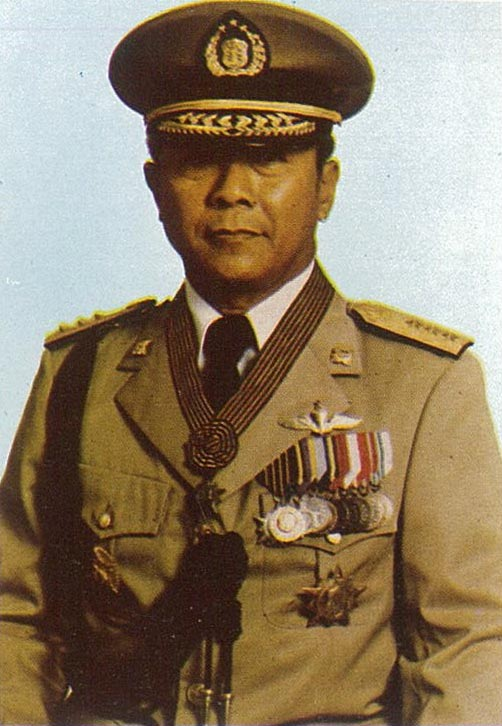

7th Chief of the Indonesian National Police
- In office 26 June 1976 – 24 September 1978
- President: Suharto
- Preceded by: Mohamad Hasan
- Succeeded by: Awaluddin Djamin

8th Jakarta Regional Police Chief
- In office 16 February 1970 – 24 June 1976
- Preceded by: Soekahar
- Succeeded by: Soetadi Ronodipuro

Personal details
- Born: 1 September 1927 Surabaya, East Java, Dutch East Indies
- Died: 5 May 2017 (aged 89) Jakarta, Indonesia
- Spouse: Darmiati Poeger
- Children: Martini Indah (born 1957); Agus Aditono (born 1959); Destina Lestari (born 1961)
- Education: Police College (1955)
- Police career
- Allegiance: Indonesia
- Branch: Indonesian National Police
- Service years: 1953–1978
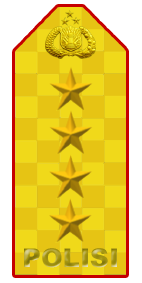
- Rank: Police-General

Police General Drs. Widodo Budidarmo (1 September 1927 – 5 May 2017) was the Chief of the Indonesian National Police (Kapolri) from 1976 to 1978, being the first Protestant National Police Chief.

== Profile ==
The eldest child of a sugar factory cashier, Widodo, was born in Kapaskamprung Village, east of Surabaya, on 1 September 1927. Widodo received his general education at a Hollandsch-Inlandsche School from 1933 to 1941, then continued to a Technical School from 1942 to 1945. During his high school education, he participated in the Indonesian War for Independence in East Java, as part of a Student's Brigade.

Widodo then entered the police force, and studied at the School of Police Science until he graduated in 1955. After that, he served as the Head of the Police Organization Division in Purwakarta for three years, from 1956 to 1959 and participated in Operations against the Darul Islam rebellion in West Java.

In early 1960, he went to the United States to study at the US Coast Guard Officers Candidate School, and completed in 1960. Returning from the US, Widodo served as head of the Greater Jakarta Police Operations Division (1960) and became heads of several divisions, becoming commander of the Air and Water Corps (1963), regional commander of Police II North Sumatra (1968), and head of Regional Police VII Metro Jaya from 1970 to 1976. Widodo was responsible for direct security operations during 1971 general election in Jakarta; after the election he secured the MPR-RI General Assembly which took place in Jakarta. Widodo was appointed a Member of the MPR-RI.

After serving as Chief of the Jakarta Police, on 25 June 1976, Widodo was appointed by President Suharto as national police chief. He served as chief of the National Police from 1976 to 1978. He was also chosen as vice president of Interpol in 1976.

As police chief Widodo Budidarmo established a joint office of three agencies, the Indonesian National Police, the DKI Jakarta Regional Government and Perum AK Jasa Raharja, under the jurisdiction of Polda Metro Jaya. The joint program operated in managing motor vehicle documents, such as STNK and BPKB. During his time as chief, the government issued Law no. 9 concerning Narcotics, dated 26 July 1976 and a special decree of the national police chief was issued regarding Satama Satwa to support the operational steps of the Indonesian National Police (1977).

== Personal life ==
On 4 June 1955, Widodo married Darmiati Poeger and had three children: Martini Indah, Agus Aditono and Destina Lestari. Widodo died at the age of 89, Friday morning on 5 May 2017 at 2.30 WIB at Medistra Hospital. He was buried at Kalibata Heroes' Cemetery, South Jakarta.
