= Tito Karnavian =

Indonesian politician and police officer (born 1964)

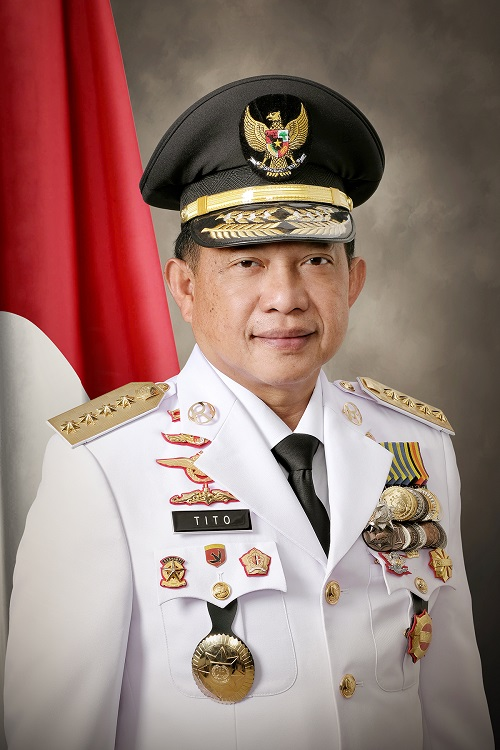
- Official portrait, 2019

29th Minister of Home Affairs
- Incumbent
- Assumed office 23 October 2019
- President: Joko Widodo; Prabowo Subianto
- Deputy: John Wempi Wetipo; Ribka Haluk; Bima Arya Sugiarto; Akhmad Wiyagus
- Preceded by: Tjahjo Kumolo

23rd Chief of the Indonesian National Police
- In office 13 July 2016 – 22 October 2019
- President: Joko Widodo
- Preceded by: Badrodin Haiti
- Succeeded by: Idham Azis

Role(s) of acting minister
- 2024: Acting Coordinating Minister for Political, Legal, and Security Affairs
Policing posts
3rd Chief of the National Counter Terrorism Agency
In office 16 March – 13 July 2016
Preceded by	Saud Usman Nasution
Succeeded by	Suhardi Alius
34th Chief of Greater Jakarta Metropolitan Regional Police
In office 12 June 2015 – 16 March 2016
Preceded by	Unggung Cahyono
Succeeded by	Moechgiyarto
12th Chief of Papua Regional Police
In office 21 September 2012 – 16 July 2014
Preceded by	B. L. Tobing
Succeeded by	Yotje Mende
Chief of Detachment 88
In office 24 November 2009 – 29 September 2010
Preceded by	Saud Usman Nasution
Succeeded by	Muhammad Syafi'i

Personal details
- Born: 26 October 1964 (age 61) Palembang, South Sumatra, Indonesia
- Spouse: Tri Suswati (m. 1991)
- Children: 3
- Education: Indonesian National Police Academy; University of Exeter; Massey University; Nanyang Technological University
- Police career
- Allegiance: Indonesia
- Department: Criminal Investigation Department (Bareskrim)
- Branch: Indonesian National Police
- Service years: 1987–2019
- Rank: Police-General

Police-General (Ret.) Muhammad Tito Karnavian (born 26 October 1964) is an Indonesian politician and retired police officer who is currently serving as Minister of Home Affairs. Previously, he served as chief of the Indonesian National Police from 2016 to 2019 and chief of the National Counter Terrorism Agency in 2016.

== Early life and education ==
Tito got his first formal education at SMA Negeri 2 Palembang and continued at the Indonesian Military Academy in 1987 because it was funded by the government. In 1993, Tito completed his education at the University of Exeter in England and earned an MA in police studies, and completed his education at the College of Police Science (STIK) in Jakarta in 1996 and earned a bachelor's degree in police studies.

Elementary school and junior high school are taken at Xaverius School, where his senior high school was at SMA Negeri 2 Palembang. When he was in grade 3, Tito started taking some undergraduate exams. He passed all tests, which included the Indonesian Armed Forces Academy, Medicine at Sriwijaya University, International Relations at Gadjah Mada University, and the State College of Accountancy. Eventually, he opted the Indonesian Military Academy, particularly the Police Academy.

- Primary School: SD Xaverius 4 Palembang, Indonesia (1976)
- Secondary School: SMP Xaverius 2 Palembang, Indonesia (1980)
- High School: SMA Negeri 2 Palembang, Indonesia (1983)
- Police Academy: Akademi Kepolisian Semarang, Indonesia (1987),
- Master of Arts (M.A.) in Police Studies, University of Exeter, UK (1993)
- Perguruan Tinggi Ilmu Kepolisian / PTIK (Police Science College), Jakarta, Indonesia (1996)
- Royal New Zealand Air Force Command & Staff College, Auckland, New Zealand (Sesko) (1998)
- Bachelor of Arts (B.A.) in Strategic Studies, Massey University, New Zealand (1998)
- Ph.D. in Strategic Studies with interest on Terrorism and Islamist Radicalization at S. Rajaratnam School of International Studies, Nanyang Technological University, Singapore (2013)

== Career ==
=== Police career ===
Tito served as chief of the Indonesian National Police from 2016 to 2019 and chief of the National Counter Terrorism Agency in 2016.

=== Political career ===
Split of Papua and West Papua Provinces

Shortly after his inauguration as Home Affairs Minister in October 2019, Tito confirmed that there would be a formation of a South Papua province, which was to be split from Papua.

Later on, in April 2021, Tito proposed on splitting Western New Guinea into six provinces; Southwest Papua, West Papua, Central Papua, Central Mountains, South Papua, and Papua Tabi Saireri.

COVID-19 Mitigation Efforts

Tito also involved in national COVID-19 mitigation efforts during 2020 world pandemics. In his involvement, he issued instructions to all local governments on health restrictions policies, including the 2022 year end holidays restrictions.

At the end of the year, he also issued the abolishment of health restrictions policies, as instructed by President Joko Widodo, considering that the national situation on pandemic is under control and the immune system of wider people have been better after several stages of vaccinations.

2020 Local Leaders Election

On 2020 elections, Tito played an important role in succeeding 270 local elections with some 140 millions voters across the country. He applied specific policies to prevent the surge of COVID-19 cases, which resulted in the democratic elections run smoothly without any increase in COVID-19 cases.

== Honours ==
=== National honours ===
- Star of Mahaputera, 2nd Class (Indonesian: Bintang Mahaputera Adipradana) (2020)
- National Police Meritorious Service Star, 1st Class (Indonesian: Bintang Bhayangkara Utama) (2016)
- Army Meritorious Service Star, 1st Class (Indonesian: Bintang Kartika Eka Paksi Utama) (2018)
- Navy Meritorious Service Star, 1st Class (Indonesian: Bintang Jalasena Utama) (2018)
- Air Force Meritorious Service Star, 1st Class (Indonesian: Bintang Swa Bhuwana Paksa Utama) (2018)
- National Police Meritorious Service Star, 2nd Class (Indonesian: Bintang Bhayangkara Pratama)
- National Police Meritorious Service Star, 3rd Class (Indonesian: Bintang Bhayangkara Nararya)
- Police Long Service Medal, 32 Years (Indonesian: Satyalancana Pengabdian XXXII Tahun)
- Medal for Advancing Police Organization (Indonesian: Satyalancana Jana Utama)
- Medal for Meritorious Policing Duty (Indonesian: Satyalancana Ksatria Bhayangkara)
- Medal for Concrete Work in the Police Force (Indonesian: Satyalancana Karya Bhakti)
- Medal for Police Education (Indonesian: Satyalancana Bhakti Pendidikan)
- Medal for Police Duty in International Peacekeeping (Indonesian: Satyalancana Bhakti Buana)
- Medal for Police Duty in Remote Regions (Indonesian: Satyalancana Bhakti Nusa)
- Medal for National Defense Service (Indonesian: Satyalancana Dharma Nusa)
- Medal for Police Operation (Indonesian: Satyalancana Operasi Kepolisian)
- Military Operation Service Medal in Aceh (Indonesian: Satyalancana G.O.M VII)
- Military Operation Service Medal Raksaka Dharma (Indonesian: Satyalancana Raksaka Dharma)
- Medal for Providing an Example of Meritorious Personality (Indonesian: Satyalancana Wira Karya)
- Medal for Service in the Field of Social Welfare (Indonesian: Satyalancana Kebhaktian Sosial)

=== Foreign honours ===
Brunei:

- Order of Paduka Keberanian Laila Terbilang, 1st Class (DPKT) – Dato Paduka Seri (15 July 2017)

East Timor:

- Medal of Merit (2018)

Malaysia:

- Pingat Panglima Gagah Pasukan Polis (P.G.P.P.) (2017)

Russia:

- "100 years of International Police Cooperation" Jubilee Medal (2017)

Singapore:

- Darjah Utama Bakti Cemerlang (D.U.B.C.) (2020)

== Publications ==
- Indonesian Top Secret: Membongkar Konflik Poso (Breaking Down Poso Conflict), Gramedia, Jakarta, 2008.
- Regional Fraternity: Collaboration between Violent Groups in Indonesia and the Philippines, a chapter in a book of "Terrorism in South and Southeast Asia in the Coming Decade", ISEAS, Singapura, 2009.
- Bhayangkara di Bumi Cenderawasih (The Guardian in The Land of Cendrawasih Bird), ISPI Strategic Series, Jakarta, 2013.
- Explaining Islamist Insurgencies, Imperial College, London, 2014
- Polri Dalam Arsitektur Negara (Police in State Architecture), LIPI, Jakarta, 2017.
- Democratic Policing, Gramedia, Jakarta, 2017.

== Gallery ==
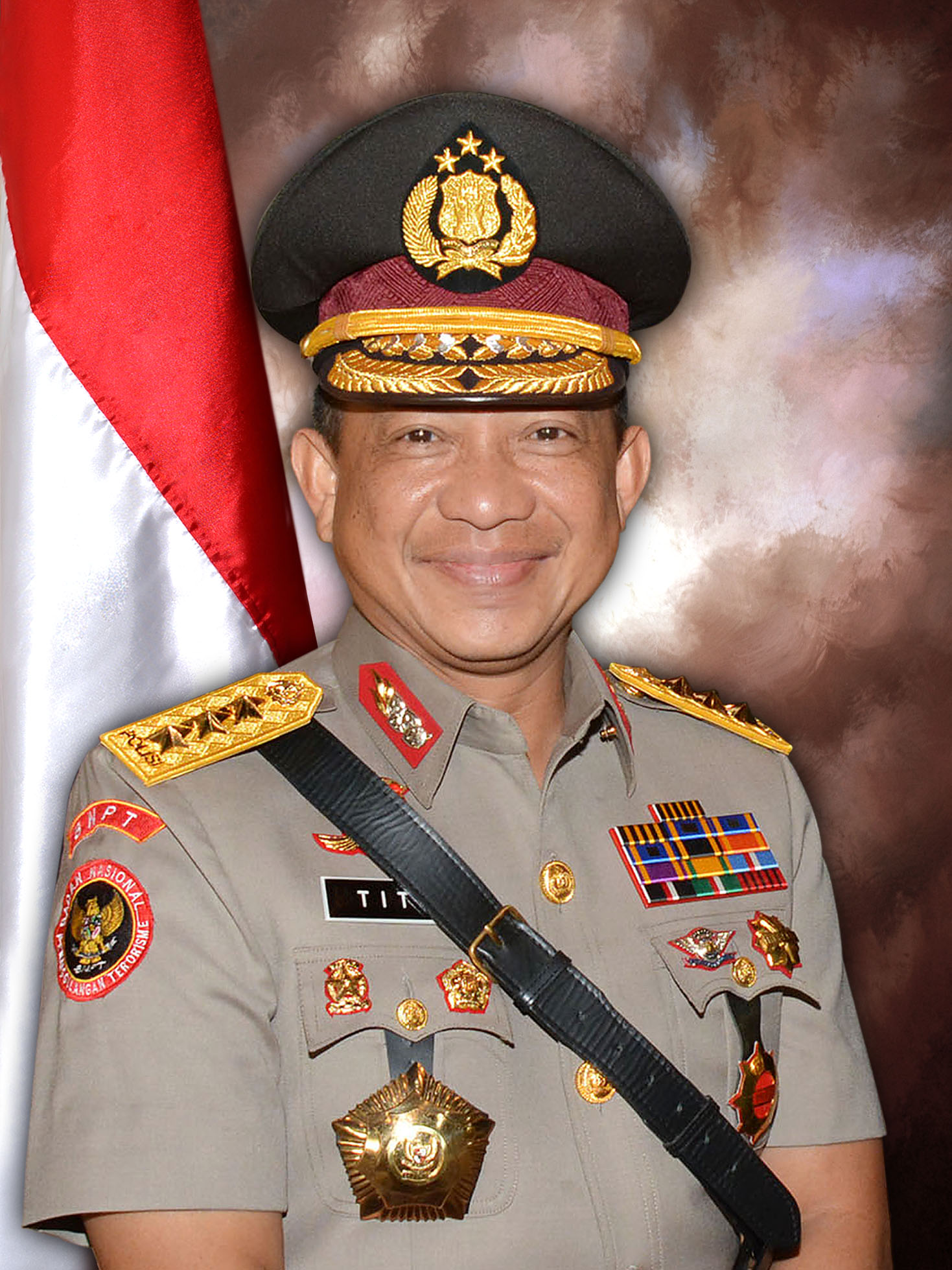
Karnavian as Chief of National Agency for Combating Terrorism, March 2016

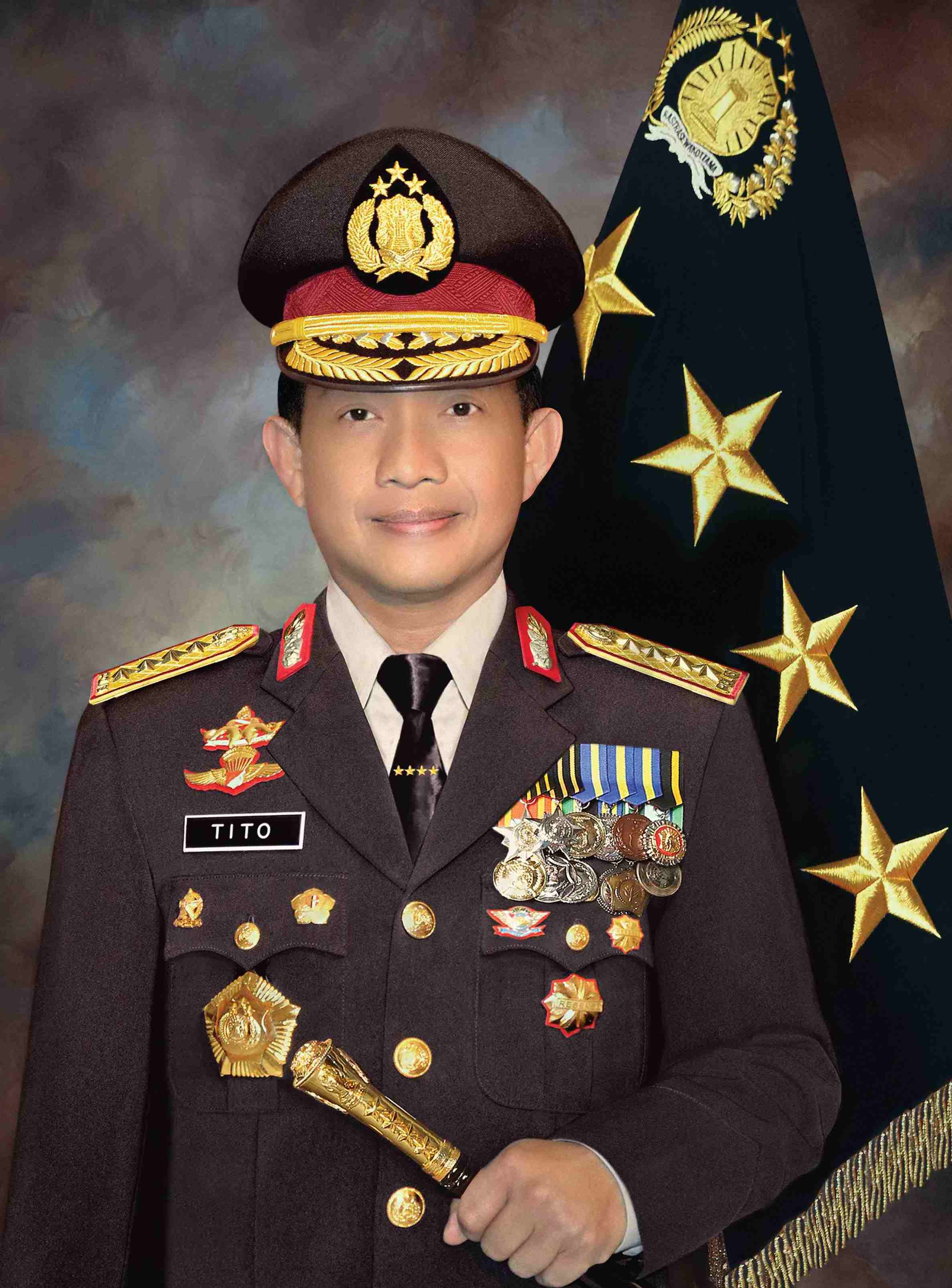
Karnavian as Chief of National Police of Indonesia, July 2016

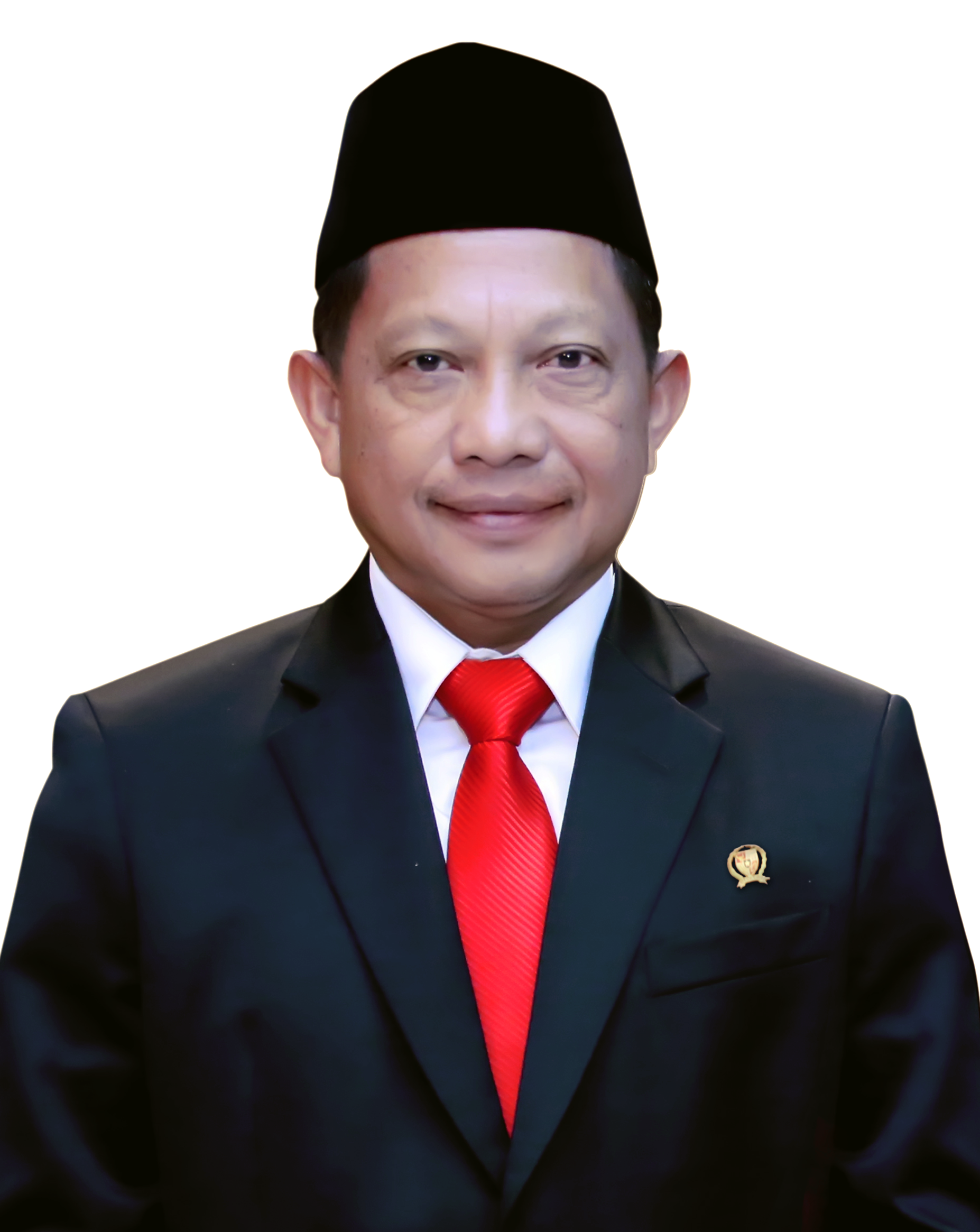
Karnavian in the Onward Indonesia Cabinet, 2019

Political offices
Preceded by Tjahjo Kumolo	Minister of Home Affairs; 2019–present	Incumbent
Police appointments
Preceded by Saud Usman Nasution	Chief of Detachment 88; 2009–2010	Succeeded by Muhammad Syafi'i
Preceded by B. L. Tobing	Chief of Papua Regional Police; 2012–2014	Succeeded by Yotje Mende
Preceded by Unggung Cahyono	Chief of Greater Jakarta Metropolitan Regional Police; 2015–2016	Succeeded by Moechgiyarto
Preceded by Saud Usman Nasution	Chief of the National Counter Terrorism Agency; 2016–2016	Succeeded by Suhardi Alius
Preceded by Badrodin Haiti	Chief of the Indonesian National Police; 2016–2019	Succeeded by Idham Azis
