= Mochammad Sanoesi =

Indonesian police chief

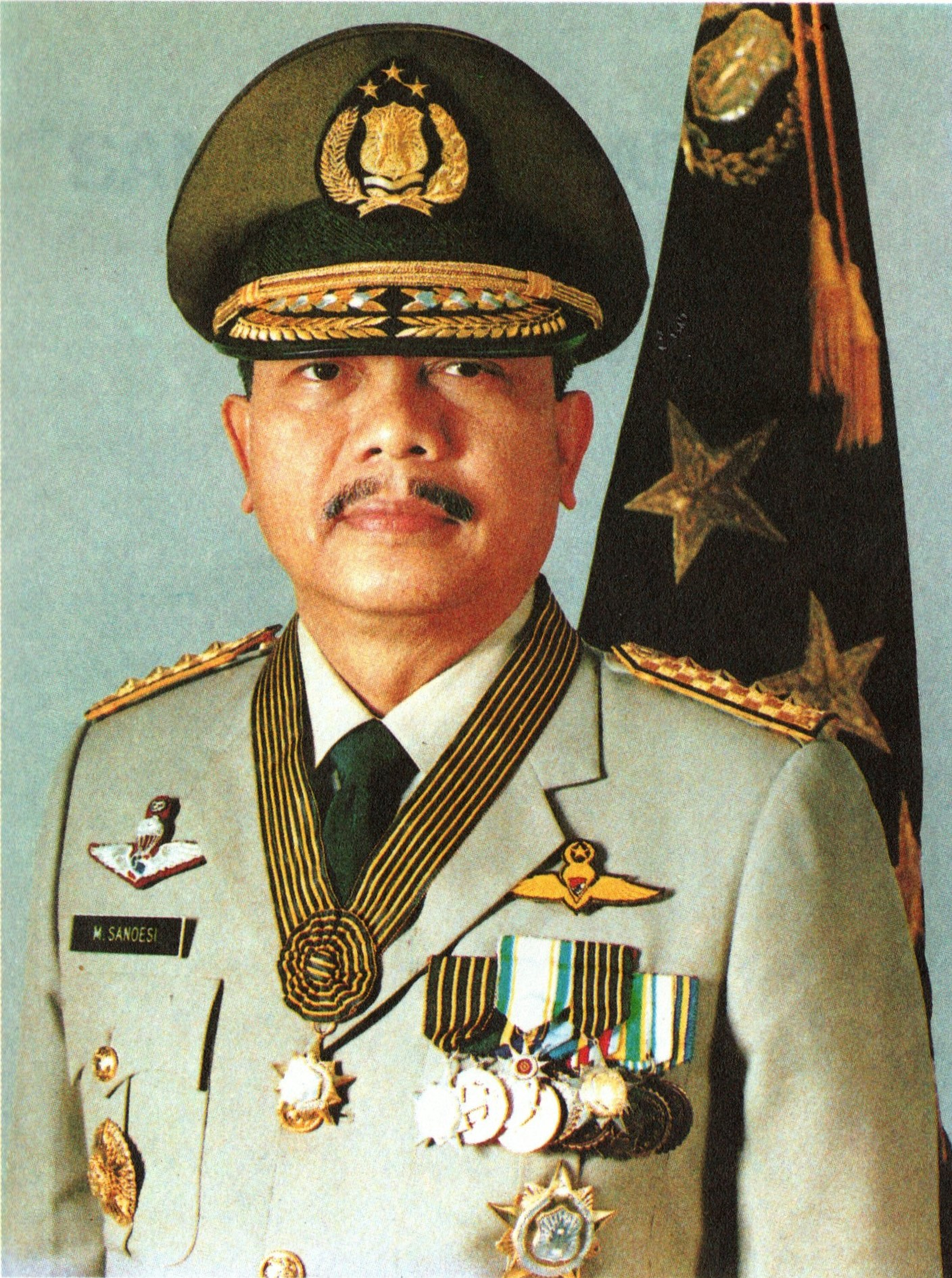
- Sanoesi in 1986

10th Chief of the Indonesian National Police
- In office 7 June 1989 – 19 February 1991
- President: Suharto
- Preceded by: Anton Soedjarwo
- Succeeded by: Kunarto

Personal details
- Born: February 15, 1935 Buitenzorg, Dutch East Indies
- Died: December 26, 2008 (aged 73) Jakarta, Indonesia

Military service
- Branch/service: Indonesian National Police
- Years of service: 1957—1991
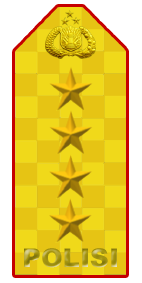
- Rank: Police General

Police General Mochammad Sanoesi (Bogor, West Java, 15 February 1935 – Jakarta, 26 December 2008) was the tenth Chief of the Indonesian National Police from 7 June 1985 to 19 February 1991.

== Honours ==
- France:
  - Commander of the National Order of the Legion of Honour
- Malaysia:
  - Honorary Commander of the Order of Loyalty to the Crown of Malaysia - Tan Sri (P.S.M.) (1988)

Preceded by Anton Soedjarwo	Chief of the Indonesian National Police; 1985–1991	Succeeded by Koenarto
