= Jusuf Manggabarani =

Deputy Chief of National Police of Indonesia from 2010 to 2011

Jusuf Manggabarani (11 February 1953 – 20 May 2025) was an Indonesian National Police officer who served as Deputy Chief of the Indonesian National Police accompanying General Timur Pradopo. Over a career spanning more than three decades, he held numerous key positions within the Indonesian National Police, including leadership roles in the Mobile Brigade Corps and as regional police chief in several provinces.

Manggabarani was born in Gowa to Andi Hasan Manggabarani and Andi Mani Intan. His last position in the Indonesian National Police was as Deputy Chief of Police and he retired in 2011.

== Early life and education ==
Jusuf Manggabarani was born on 11 February 1953, in Gowa, South Sulawesi, Indonesia. He pursued a career in law enforcement and enrolled in the Indonesian Armed Forces Academy, graduating in 1975.

== Police career ==
After graduating from the Indonesian Armed Forces Academy, Manggabarani began his career with a series of assignments in Bali. His early roles included serving as a junior officer in the Bali Regional Police Command, where he was appointed Platoon Commander of Company 5142 in 1976 and later as Company Commander of Company 5142 in 1977. He continued to serve in various operational and leadership positions within the Mobile Brigade units in Bali, including as Operations Officer and Commander of Company 5115.

Throughout the 1980s and 1990s, Manggabarani steadily advanced through the ranks of the Indonesian National Police. He held several key positions in the Mobile Brigade Corps (Korps Brigade Mobil, or Brimob), including Deputy Commander of the Brimob Unit in the Bali Regional Police Command and later in the South and Southeast Sulawesi Regional Police Command. He also served as Commander of the Gegana Detachment, a special unit within the Mobile Brigade Corps specializing in bomb disposal and counterterrorism.

In the early 1990s, Manggabarani took on more senior roles, such as Head of the Brimob Unit in the South and Southeast Sulawesi Regional Police and the East Nusa Tenggara Regional Police. He was later appointed Head of the Gegana Unit at the Mobile Brigade Headquarters and held several leadership positions at the Mobile Brigade Training Center, including as deputy head and secretary.

Upon serving in the mobile brigade, Manggabarani was transferred to Ujung Pandang (now Makassar), the largest city in the eastern part of Indonesia, where he became the police chief with the rank of colonel. During his tenure, he chaired an Asian Cup Winners' Cup match in the city between the Royal Thai Air Force and the PSM Makassar. He also uncovered a case of counterfeit paint oil production which lacked official permits from the local government. In 1998, he was appointed Chief of the Bandung Metropolitan Police.

He then served as Deputy Chief of the South Sulawesi Regional Police in 1999. He also served as Head of the Mobile Brigade Corps from 6 December 2001, to 27 January 2002, where he was responsible for leading the elite paramilitary unit of the Indonesian National Police. After the Indonesian government, under Presidential Instruction (Inpres) No.4 April 11, 2001, decided to take a more comprehensive and forceful approach to resolve the conflict, the security apparatus in Aceh was restructured. As part of this reorganization, Manggabarani, who was the commander of the national mobile police brigade (Brimob), was appointed to overall supervision of the new Operation for the Restoration of Security and Upholding the Law. Under Manggabarani’s command, both the police and the army were given equal responsibility for operations. Although the operations were officially under police authority, they were heavily backed by the military, especially units with special forces training.

Manggabarani coordinated a systematic campaign targeting suspected GAM (Free Aceh Movement) strongholds and headquarters. These operations resulted in many claims from local organizations about civilian casualties, widespread violence, and destruction of property (such as the burning of 800 homes and the deaths of 150 people confirmed by the Indonesian Red Cross between June and mid-July 2001 alone). The security forces also restricted access to the area and obstructed independent investigations into human rights violations, such as when members of the human rights group Kontras were detained and tortured by security forces while investigating incidents under Manggabarani’s watch. His role in the Aceh conflict led to his appointment as Chief of the Aceh Regional Police in 2002 while retaining his leadership of the Operation for the Restoration of Security and Upholding the Law. In 2003, he became Chief of the South Sulawesi Regional Police.

Manggabarani’s expertise in internal affairs and professional standards was recognized with his appointment as Head of the Profession and Security Division of the Indonesian National Police in 2005. In 2007, he was named chief supervisor of the Indonesian National Police, responsible for overseeing internal audits and ensuring accountability within the force. During his tenure, Manggabarani visited the Medan police for its alleged mishandling of the protests in front of the North Sumatra provincial parliament, which resulted in the death of speaker Abdul Azis Angkat.

Upon serving as the chief supervisor of the national police, Manggabarani was named as the deputy national police chief on the last day of 2009. He officially assumed office a week later, on 6 January 2010, replacing Makbul Padmanegara. In July 2010, Manggabarani was named as one of the front runner candidates for the national police chief, although the role was eventually given to the more junior Jakarta police chief Timur Pradopo.

During his tenure, in September 2010 Manggabarani was instructed by national police chief to visit Buol in Central Sulawesi following riots between the Buol populace and the local police that stemmed from the in-custody death of Kasmir Timumun, a taxi driver. As the chief investigator of the incident, Manggabarani questioned the Buol police chief for his role in the arrest of Timumun, and four civilians who incited the riots. Contrary to the public opinion in Buol at that time, Manggabarani claimed that Kasmir Timumun's death was a result of suicide, sparking further hatred on the police in Buol.

Manggabarani's official retirement date was on 11 February 2011, exactly on his 58th birthday. However, Manggabarani continued to retain his position even after the date, sparking criticism from the Indonesia Police Watch. He resigned and retired from the police service on 28 February, which was marked with a launching of his biography, titled Cahaya Bhayangkara (The Police's Light). He officially handed over his office a day later on 1 March 2011 to Nanan Soekarna. Upon retiring, Manggabarani announced his intention to become an entrepreneur.

== Death ==
On 20 May 2025, he died while receiving medical treatment at Dr. Wahidin Sudirohusodo General Hospital in Makassar, South Sulawesi. He was 72. Following his death, his body was taken to his family residence in Bukit Khatulistiwa Housing Complex, Tamalanrea District, Makassar. Plans were made for his burial in Jakarta.
