= Bambang Hendarso Danuri =

Chief of National Police of Indonesia from 2008 to 2010

Police-General (Ret.) Tan Sri Bambang Hendarso Danuri DUBC
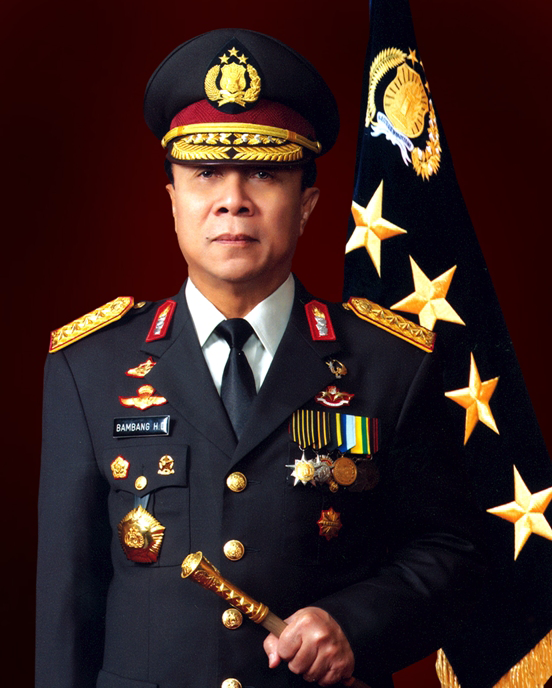

19th Chief of National Police of Indonesia
- In office 1 October 2008 – 22 October 2010
- President: Susilo Bambang Yudhoyono
- Preceded by: Sutanto
- Succeeded by: Timur Pradopo

Personal details
- Born: 10 October 1952 (age 73) Bogor, West Java, Indonesia
- Spouse: Nanny Hartiningsih
- Children: Hanny Kuncoro Hendarso, Bayu Huda Wicaksono Hendarso
- Police career
- Allegiance: Indonesia
- Branch: Indonesian National Police
- Service years: 1974—2010
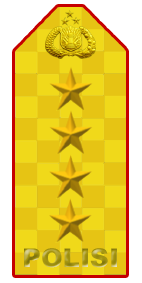
- Rank: Police-General

Police-General Bambang Hendarso Danuri (born 10 October 1952) is the former Chief of the Indonesian National Police (Kapolri) from 1 October 2008 to October 2010. He replaced Chief of Police General Sutanto who was relieved of duty. He was nominated by the Indonesian President, Susilo Bambang Yudhoyono.

== Honours ==
- Malaysia: Honorary Commander of the Order of Loyalty to the Crown of Malaysia - Tan Sri (P.S.M.) (2010)
- Singapore: Distinguished Service Order (2010)
