= Badrodin Haiti =

Indonesian police commssioner

Police-General (Ret.) Tan Sri Badrodin Haiti
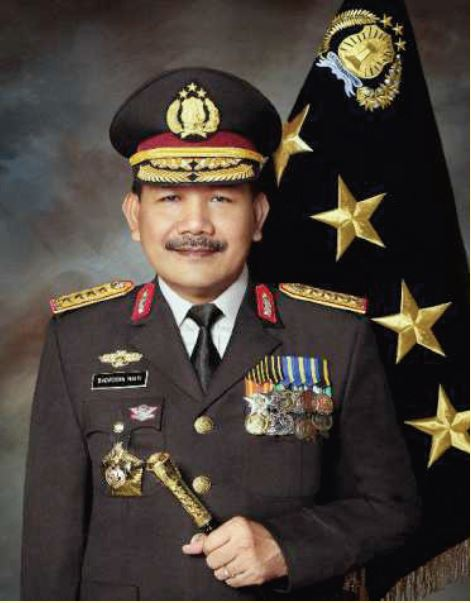

22nd Chief of National Police of Indonesia
- In office 17 April 2015 – 13 July 2016
- President: Joko Widodo
- Preceded by: Sutarman
- Succeeded by: Tito Karnavian

Personal details
- Born: 24 July 1958 (age 68) Jember, East Java, Indonesia
- Spouse: Tejaningsih Haiti
- Children: Farouq Ashadi Haiti Fakhri Subhana Haiti
- Education: Akpol 1982
- Awards: Adhi Makayasa (1982)

Military service
- Allegiance: Indonesia
- Branch/service: Indonesian National Police
- Years of service: 1981–2016
- Rank: Police-General
- Unit: Reserse

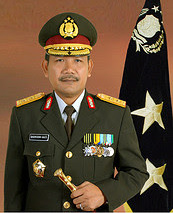
Haiti as Chief of East Java Police (2010)

Police-General Badrodin Haiti was the Chief of the Indonesian National Police from 16 January 2015 until 13 July 2016, succeeding, Police-General Sutarman. On 16 January 2015 Badrodin was appointed by Indonesian President Joko Widodo to be the Acting Chief of Indonesian National Police replacing Sutarman, who officially retired from the service and awaiting the elected Police Chief Police-Commissioner General Budi Gunawan who was a suspect on a corruption case. On 16 April 2015, he was confirmed unanimously by Indonesian House of Representatives and sworn in by President Joko Widodo on 17 April 2015. He was replaced by Police-General Tito Karnavian.

In 2020, he was appointed President Commissioner at state-owned construction firm Waskita Karya.

== Education ==
1. Akpol (1982)
2. PTIK (1989)
3. Sespim (1997)
4. Lemhanas RI (2003)

== Rank ==
1. Second Lieutenant (1982)
2. First Lieutenant (1984)
3. Major (1987)
4. Lieutenant Colonel (1992)
5. Colonel/Police Assistant Commissioner (1997)
6. Police Commissioner (2002)
7. Police Brigadier General (2007)
8. Police Inspector General (2010)
9. Police Commissioner General (2013)
10. Police General (2015)

== Career history ==
1. Danton Sabhara Dit Samapta Polda Metro Jaya (1982)
2. Kasubro Ops Polres Metro Depok Polda Metro Jaya (1983)
3. Kapolsek Pancoran Mas Polres Metro Depok Polda Metro Jaya (1983)
4. Kabin Info PPKO Polda Metro Jaya (1984)
5. Kabag Min Polres Aileu Polwil Timor Timur (1985)
6. Kasat Serse Polres Metro Bekasi Polda Metro Jaya (1990)
7. Kapolsek Metro Sawah Besar Polres Metro Jakpus Polda Metro Jaya (1993)
8. Kasat Serse Polres Metro Jakbar Polda Metro Jaya (1994)
9. Wakapolres Metro Jaktim Polda Metro Jaya (1995)
10. Pabungkol Spri Kapolri (1996)
11. Pamen Mabes Polri (1997)
12. Paban Madya Dukminops Paban II/Ops Sops Polri (1998)
13. Chief of Probolinggo Police Resort (1999)
14. Chief of Medan Metropolis Police (2000)
15. Director of East Java Criminal Investigation Police (2003)
16. Chief of Semarang Metropolis Police (2004)
17. Chief of Banten Regional Police (2004)
18. Institute Secretary of Police Education and Training Institutions (2005)
19. Chief of Central Sulawesi Regional Police (2006)
20. First Director of Criminal Investigation Police Agency (2008–2009)
21. Chief of North Sumatra Regional Police (2009–2010)
22. Head of Legal Division National Police of Indonesia(2010)
23. Chief of East Java Regional Police (2010–2011)
24. Expert Staff Chief of National Police of Indonesia (2011)
25. Operations Assistant Chief of National Police of Indonesia (2011–2013)
26. Head of the Police Security Sustainer (2013–2014)
27. Vice Chief of National Police of Indonesia (2014–2015)
28. Acting Chief of National Police of Indonesia (2015)
29. Chief of National Police of Indonesia (2015–2016)

== Honours ==
Awards and decorations

Baris ke-1	Star of Mahaputera 2nd Class (2016)		
Baris ke-2	Grand Meritorious Military Order Star, 1st Class (2016)	National Police Meritorious Service Star, 1st Class (2015)	Army Meritorious Service Star, 1st Class (2016)
Baris ke-3	Navy Meritorious Service Star, 1st Class (2016)	Air Force Meritorious Service Star, 1st Class (2016)	National Police Meritorious Service Star, 2nd Class
Baris ke-4	National Police Meritorious Service Star, 3rd Class	Darjah Utama Bakti Cemerlang (D.U.B.C.) - Singapura (2016)	Honorary Commander of the Order of Loyalty to the Crown of Malaysia (P.S.M.) - Malaysia (2022)
Baris ke-5	Satyalancana Pengabdian 32 Tahun	Satyalancana Pengabdian 24 Tahun	Satyalancana Pengabdian 16 Tahun
Baris ke-6	Satyalancana Pengabdian 8 Tahun	Satyalancana Jana Utama	Satyalancana Ksatria Bhayangkara
Baris ke-7	Satyalancana Karya Bhakti	Satyalancana Bhakti Pendidikan	Satyalancana Bhakti Nusa
Baris ke-8	Satyalancana Dharma Nusa	Satyalancana Seroja	Satyalancana Wira Karya
Baris ke-9	Satyalancana Operasi Kepolisian	Satyalancana Santi Dharma	United Nations Transitional Authority in Cambodia (UNTAC) Medal

Brevet
Brevet Selam Polri
Brevet Kavaleri Marinir
Pin Pelopor Keselamatan Lalu Lintas

Police appointments
Preceded by Sutarman	Chief of National Police of Indonesia; 2015–2016	Succeeded by Tito Karnavian
