= Said Soekanto Tjokrodiatmodjo =

Indonesian police officer (1908–1993)

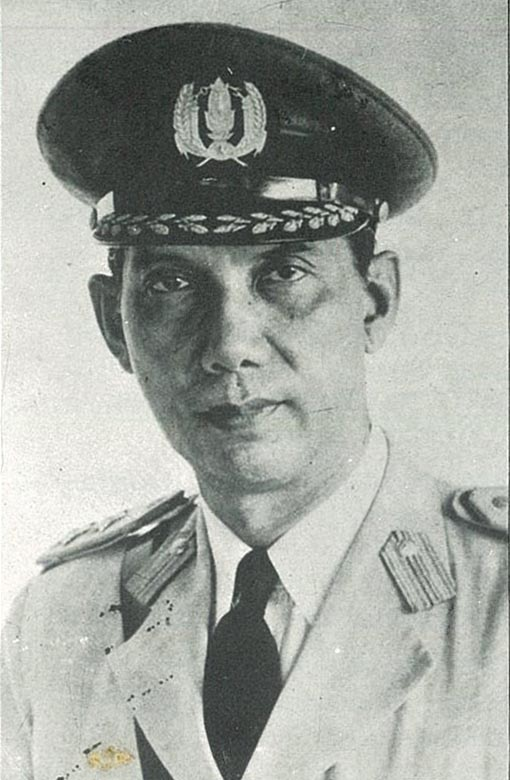

1st Deputy Minister of Police of the Republic of Indonesia
- In office 10 July 1959 – 15 December 1959
- President: Sukarno
- Premier: Sukarno (de facto)
- Preceded by: himself (as Head of the Police Service)
- Succeeded by: Soekarno Djojonegoro

1st Head of the Indonesian National Police Service
- In office 1 July 1946 – 15 December 1959
- President: Sukarno; Sjafruddin Prawiranegara (Acting); Sukarno
- Premier: List: Sutan Syahrir; Amir Sjarifuddin; Mohammad Hatta; Susanto Tirtoprodjo (Acting); Mohammad Natsir; Sukiman Wirjosandjojo; Wilopo; Ali Sastroamidjojo; Burhanuddin Harahap; Djuanda Kartawijaya
- Deputy: Raden Soemarto
- Preceded by: Himself (as Chief of the National Police)
- Succeeded by: self (as the Deputy Minister of the Republic of Indonesia Police)

1st Chief of National Police of Indonesia
- In office 29 September 1945 – 1 July 1946
- President: Sukarno
- Premier: Sutan Syahrir
- Minister of Home Affairs: Sutan Syahrir; Sudarsono
- Preceded by: Himself (as Head of the National Police Agency)
- Succeeded by: Himself (as Head of the National Police Service)

1st Head of the Republic of Indonesia National Police Agency
- In office 19 August 1945 – 29 September 1945
- President: Sukarno
- Premier: Sutan Syahrir
- Minister of Home Affairs (Note: The Police Agency from 1945 to 1946 was under the Ministry of Home Affairs of the Republic of Indonesia): Wiranatakusumah V
- Preceded by: positions created
- Succeeded by: Himself (as Chief of the National Police)

Personal details
- Born: 7 June 1908 Buitenzorg, West Java, Dutch East Indies
- Died: 24 August 1993 (aged 85) Jakarta, Indonesia

Military service
- Allegiance: Dutch East Indies (1930–1942); Empire of Japan (1942–1945); Indonesia (1945–1959)
- Branch/service: Indonesian National Police
- Years of service: 1945–1959
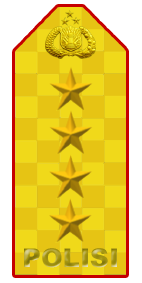
- Rank: Police-General

Police-General Said Soekanto Tjokrodiatmodjo (7 June 1908 – 24 August 1993) was the first Chief of the Indonesian National Police (Kapolri) and National Hero of Indonesia.

== Early life ==
Raden Said Soekanto Tjokrodiatmodjo was born in Bogor, West Java, the eldest of six siblings, of R. Martomihardjo, a civil servant from Ketangi Daleman, Purworejo, Central Java and Kasmirah from Ciawi, Bogor, West Java. At a few months old, Soekanto and his parents left Bogor and moved to Balaraja, Serang, after Martomihardjo was appointed a wedana. In 1910, his family moved to Tangerang. His father's position as a civil servant and wedana, had a great influence on Soekanto's life because his father had authority in the local community.

== Education ==
Soekanto was one of the few indigenous people who received a Dutch education. During his time at Europeesche Lagere School Bogor, Soekanto refused to be given a Dutch name, This refusal was based on advice given by his father not to change Soekanto's name to a Dutch nickname.

While studying at Rechtshoogeschool te Batavia in 1928, Soekanto became acquainted with Jong Java and nationalist figures, Sartono and Iwa Kusumasumantri, discussing the struggle for Indonesian independence. He was forced to leave Rechtshoogeschool te Batavia because his father had retired from the position of Wedana Tangerang.

In 1930, Soekanto was accepted as a student of Aspirant Commisaris van Politie, graduating in 1933 and receiving the rank of Police Commissioner class III.

== Career ==
On 29 September 1945, R.S. Soekanto was appointed by President Sukarno as the Chief of the Indonesian National Police, taking over responsibility from the Hoofd van de Dienst der Algemene Politie. Soekanto consolidated the police force to form the Indonesian National Police.

On 15 December 1958, he was replaced by Soekarno Djojonegoro, as Chief of the Indonesian National Police.

On 8 August 1973, During the New Order government he was appointed by President Suharto to the Supreme Advisory Council as Head of the People's Welfare Section until he was honourably discharged on 23 March 1978.

== Personal life ==
Soekanto married Bua Hadjijah Lena Mokoginta, his schoolmate from Meer Uitgebreid Lager Onderwijs on 12 April 1932. They had one daughter.

He died at Police Hospital on 25 August 1993. He was buried in the same grave with his wife at the Tanah Kusir public cemetery, Jakarta.

On 10 November 2020, Soekanto received the title of National Hero of Indonesia by President Joko Widodo.
