= Anton Soedjarwo =

Indonesian chief of police

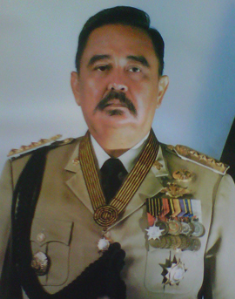
Anton Soedjarwo

Police General Anton Soedjarwo (21 September 1930 in Bandung, West Java – 18 April 1988 in Bandung) was Chief of the Indonesian National Police from 4 December 1983 to 6 June 1985. His son, Rudy Soedjarwo, is a film director.

== Life timeline ==
- 1952 - graduated from high school in Magelang
- 1954 - graduated from police academy in Sukabumi
- 1954–1956 - Police Chief Inspector in Palopo
- 1956 - aide Chief of Police Sukanto Tjokrodiatmodjo
- 1956–1957 - Head of Traffic at Makassar
- 1957–1958 - attache Foreign Relations Section of the Bureau of Police Headquarters Organizations
- 1959–1961 - Force Commander on Mobile Brigade
- 1960 - ranger training in Porong
- 1961 - infantry training in the United States
- 1962–1964 - Battalion Commander 1232/Pelopor on Mobile Brigade
- 1962 - led the unit that went into New Guinea
- 1964–1972 - Commander, Pioneer Regiment, Brimob
- 1967 - Furthered his studies at the Staff College in Lembang
- 1969 - Graduated as a paratrooper in Sukasari
- 1969–1972 - Tanjung Priok district police chief
- 1972–1974 - Commander, Kores 102, Kodak 10 in Malang
- 1974 - Commander, Komapta
- 1974–1976 - Commander, Regional Command Police (Kodak) 11 (West Kalimantan)
- 1976–1978 - Commander, Kodak 2 (North Sumatra)
- 1978–1983 - Brigadier General (Pol.), then Major General (Pol.), Kodak 7 (Jakarta Raya)
- 1983–1985 - Chief of the Indonesian National Police

Preceded by Awaluddin Djamin	Chief of the Indonesian National Police; 1983–1985	Succeeded by Mochammad Sanoesi
