= Criminal Investigation Agency =

Indonesian police agency

Criminal Investigation Department Badan Reserse Kriminal
- The crest of the Bareskrim
- Abbreviation: Bareskrim
- Motto: Sidik Sakti Indera Waspada

Jurisdictional structure
- Operations jurisdiction: Indonesia
- Primary governing body: Government of Indonesia
- Secondary governing body: Indonesian National Police

Operational structure
- Overseen by Police: Ministry of Home Affairs
- Headquarters: Jl. Trunojoyo No. 3, Jakarta 12110
- Minister of Home Affair responsible: Tito Karnavian

Notables
- People: Police Commissioner General Agus Andrianto, current commander

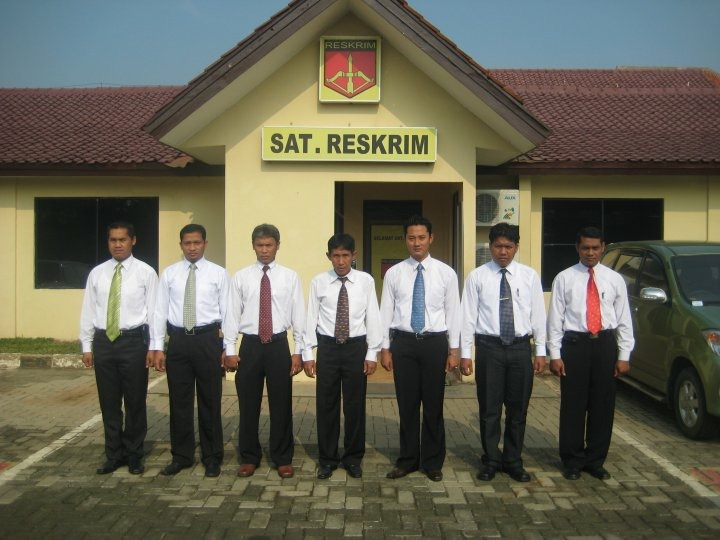
Indonesian Police investigators from the criminal investigation unit

Criminal Investigation Agency (Indonesian: Badan Reserse Kriminal, abbr. Bareskrim) is one of central executive agencies of Indonesian Police Force. Bareskrim is led by Kepala Bareskrim / Kabareskrim (Chief of Criminal Investigation Agency), a three-star general in Indonesian National Police. Bareskrim conducts inquiries into a variety of criminal offences, initiates criminal investigations, identifies suspects, makes arrests, and is in charge of forensic laboratory. The agency is currently led by Komisaris Jenderal Polisi (Police Commissioner General) Agus Andrianto. Officers from this unit wear civilian attire on duty.

== Organisation ==
The organisation of Bareskrim consists of:

- Leadership Element
  - Chief of Criminal Investigation Agency (Kepala Badan Reserse Kriminal Polri / Kabareskrim)
  - Vice Chief of Criminal Investigation Agency (Wakil Kepala Badan Reserse Kriminal Polri / Wakabareskrim)
- Auxiliary elements of leadership and Operational Staff
  - Bureau of Development and Operation (Biro Pembinaan dan Operasional / Robinopsnal)
  - Bureau of Planning and Administration (Biro Perencanaan dan Administrasi / Rorenmin)
  - Bureau of Investigation Supervision (Biro Pengawasan Penyidikan / Rowassidik)
  - Bureau of Coordination and Supervision of Civil Servants Investigator (Biro Koordinasi dan Pengawasan Penyidik Pegawai Negeri Sipil / Rokorwas PPNS)
- Special Executive Element
  - Forensic Laboratory Centre (Pusat Laboratorium Forensik / Puslabfor)
  - Indonesia Automatic Fingerprint Identification System Centre (Pusinafis)
  - National Criminal Information Centre (Pusat Informasi Kriminal Nasional / Pusiknas)
- Main Executive Element
  - Directorate of General Crime Investigation (Direktorat Tipidum)
  - Directorate of Financial Crimes (Direktorat Tipideksus)
  - Directorate of Corruption-related Crimes (Direktorat Tipidkor)
  - Directorate of Narcotics (Direktorat Tipidnarkoba)
  - Directorate of Cyber Crime (Direktorat Tipidsiber)
  - Directorate of Energy Resources and Environmental Crimes (Direktorat Tipidter), handles such as environmental crime, wildlife, fishery, forestry, mine, oil and gas, energy and related.

== Former Chiefs ==
- Police Commissioner General Listyo Sigit Prabowo (promoted as Chief of National Police)
- Police Commissioner General (ret.) Idham Azis (then-promoted as Chief of National Police)
- Police Commissioner General Arief Sulistyanto (currently Chief of Security Preserving Body)
- Police Commissioner General (ret.) Ari Dono Sukmanto (then-promoted as Vice Chief of National Police)
- Police Commissioner General (ret.) Anang Iskandar
- Police Commissioner General (ret.) Budi Waseso
- Police Commissioner General (ret.) Suhardi Alius
- Police Commissioner General (ret.) Sutarman (then-promoted as Chief of National Police)
- Police Commissioner General (ret.) Ito Sumardi
- Police Commissioner General (ret.) Susno Duadji
- Police Commissioner General (ret.) Bambang Hendarso Danuri (then-promoted as Chief of National Police)
