= Fifth Force (Indonesia) =

Proposed paramilitary service branch of the Armed Forces of the Republic of Indonesia

- Angkatan Kelima
- Country: Indonesia
- Type: Militia reserve force
- Role: Land warfare; Preparation against war; Defence of the nation against Nekolim; Assistance in maintaining public order
- Size: 15,000,000 (projected)
- Part of: Armed Forces of the Republic of Indonesia (proposed)

Commanders
- Commander-in-Chief: President Sukarno
- Chief of Staff of the Fifth Force: Major General Achmadi Hadisoemarto (nominated)

The Fifth Force (Indonesian: Angkatan Kelima) was a proposed military branch of the Armed Forces of the Republic of Indonesia. Conceived by the Indonesian Communist Party (PKI), it represented an initiative aimed at mobilizing armed workers and peasants.

== Background ==
During the Guided Democracy Era, the elements of the Armed Forces of the Republic of Indonesia (ABRI) comprised the Army, Navy, Air Force and the Police Force. Each of these elements functioned as a Ministry responsible directly to President Sukarno. Although there was a Commander of the Armed Forces acting as the Coordinating Minister for the Ministry of Defense, their role was limited to administrative duties and did not include command authority. The Police Force was part of the Indonesian Ministry of Defense until 1999, when it became an independent entity. Similarly, during the independence revolution, the Police Force was under the jurisdiction of the Department of Home Affairs.

== Development ==
=== D.N. Aidit's proposal ===
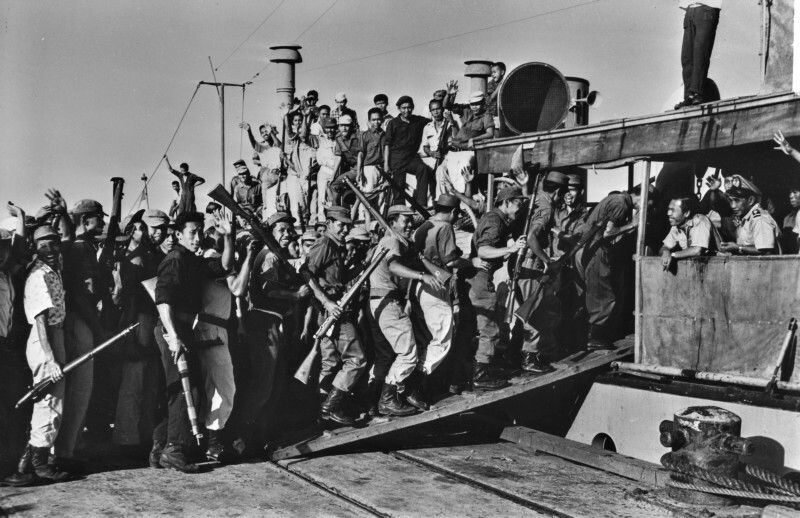
Dwikora volunteers

During Guided Democracy, the Indonesian Communist Party, a major Indonesian party after the 1955 elections, was an element in the Nasakom concept (National, Religious and Communist). With the turbulent political situation and the revolutionary call from President Sukarno and the many conflicts such as West Irian (Trikora) and Ganyang Malaysia (Dwikora) that required many volunteers, the PKI then proposed to the government/president to form a fifth force consisting of armed workers and peasants.

On 14 January 1965, the Chairman of the Central Committee of the Indonesian Communist Party, D.N. Aidit, was summoned on Thursday morning by President Sukarno at the Merdeka Palace. In his statement to the American press, Aidit expressed the intention of the PKI to propose to President Sukarno the arming of approximately 15 million peasants and workers, consisting of 10 million workers and 5 million farmers, amounting to 14.82% of the Indonesian populace at the time. The idea originated from Chairman of the Peasants Front of Indonesia, Asmoe Tjiptodarsono, in November 1964. He called on Sukarno to immediately arm Indonesian farmers, arguing that a United States invasion of Indonesia was imminent, an idea supported by Aidit. Additionally, Aidit further appealed to the Indonesian National Armed Forces (ABRI) for the provision of military training. He explained that once arms were in the hands of peasants and workers, there would be no more "boneka" or puppets in the nation, emphasizing the empowerment of the populace. Aidit clarified in response to inquiries from a CBS News journalist, Bernhard Kalb, asserting that this proposition was in response to fortifying the resilience of the ongoing revolution, intended to confront the British preparations for aggression, notably their "bolstering of the defense of their puppet state 'Malaysia'" by consolidating military forces in the east of Jambi region, possibly referring to peninsular Malaya. Moreover, Aidit expressed his intention to request ABRI to conduct military training sessions for peasants and workers, enabling them to swiftly utilize the provided arms. He disclosed that he had already communicated this plan to the British Ambassador, Andrew Gilchrist, during a meeting at the Cambodian Embassy the previous Wednesday night. Responding to inquiries from "Warta Bakhti" journalists regarding whether the PKI's initiative had been discussed with relevant organizations, such as student organizations, farmers, and worker unions, Aidit clarified that such discussions had not yet transpired with the specified organizations, indicating a forthcoming engagement.

=== Zhou Enlai's support ===
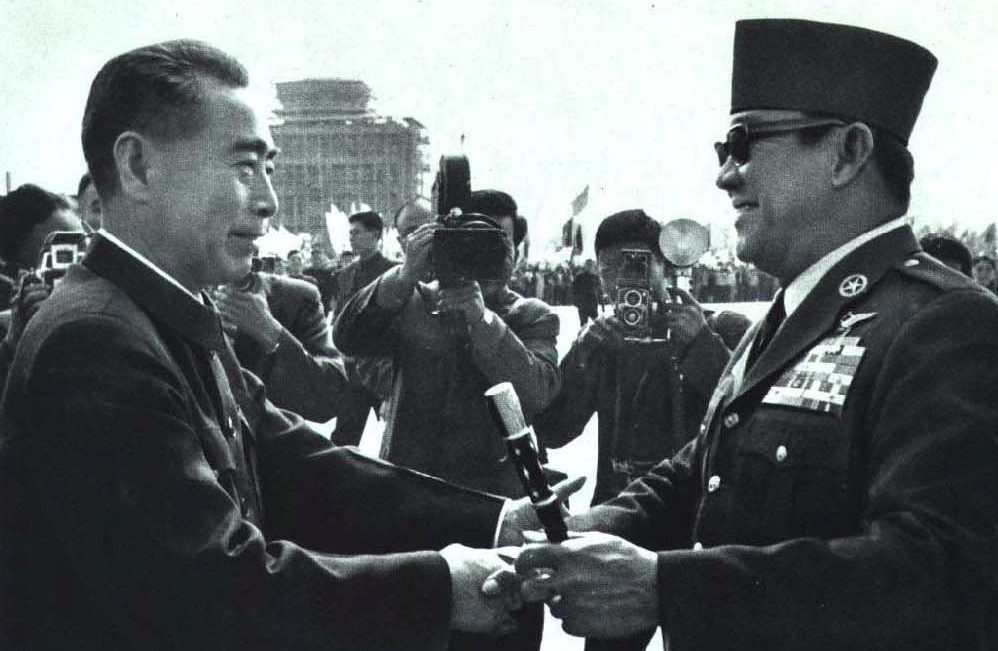
Sukarno meeting Zhou Enlai during his visit to China in 1964

During Sukarno's visit to China, Mao Zedong and then-Prime Minister Zhou Enlai proposed that Sukarno should arm workers and peasants to bolster his position and enhance the struggle against imperialists, particularly in the confrontation with Malaysia. Mao, drawing from his historical experience with the revolutionary Red Army, which had supported the founding of the People's Republic of China (PRC), advised that Sukarno could not solely rely on his existing military forces. In later more detailed conversation between Sukarno and Prime Minister Zhou Enlai, Zhou candidly expressed to Sukarno that he could not fully trust his soldiers, especially the Army, as many of the officers had been educated in the United States and maintained special relations with the U.S. He noted that numerous leaders within the Indonesian Army were reactionaries rather than revolutionary progressives, making them unreliable allies in the fight against imperialism. Consequently, Zhou recommended the formation of an independent branch, composed of armed workers and peasants, operating outside the coordination of the traditional military structure. Hearing this and the timing of Aidit's proposal, Sukarno then offered the idea of the Fifth Army as a container for volunteers. Even after the meeting and Aidit's proposal, Sukarno generally rejected Aidit's call for the arming of the workers and peasants, at least by arguing that such a thing was unnecessary. After multiple meetings, on 27 January 1965, Foreign Minister and First Deputy Prime Minister of Indonesia, Subandrio was tasked to meet with Zhou Enlai again in Beijing. To Subandrio, Zhou said his party would provide 100,000 Chung automatic weapons for free. Subandrio then went home and reported the results of his meeting to Sukarno. Leaving with the belief that Sukarno would indeed approve the project, Zhou supported Sukarno.

President Sukarno's proposal to militarise the masses was spot on. Your President is the Supreme Leader of the Armed Forces of the Sea, Land, Air and Police. There needs to be an additional force - a militia. And Sukarno needs to be the supreme commander of the militia too. Of course, this should be established gradually. The militia could defend the Homeland, the air, and the waters. Also, since the militia was made up of civilians, it could more easily conduct guerrilla warfare in North Kalimantan... the armed masses would be invisible... I am sharing my experience with you. Please convey this to the President.

— Zhou Enlai, on his opinion to Indonesian Deputy Prime Minister Subandrio, Diplomatic Bulletin of Indonesian Prime Minister Subandrio's First Visit and Bilateral Negotiations, 2 February 1965.

In April 1965, coinciding with the 10th anniversary of the Five Principles of Peace at the Bandung Conference in 1955, Zhou Enlai visited Jakarta. Zhou Enlai and his delegation now openly insisted on the formation of the Fifth Army. With Zhou Enlai personally supporting and urging the creation of the Fifth Force, publicly offering assistance of 100,000 light weapons to Indonesia in return, specifically the Chinese Type 56 'Chung' SKS; enough to fill in at least 10 armed divisions (40 battalions). This proposal was reported to President Sukarno and presented in front of the KOTI (Supreme Operations Command) meeting.

In a later conversation between Sukarno and Zhou Enlai in Shanghai in July 1965, Zhou Enlai's promise regarding the Chung type of light weapon was discussed. On September 14, 1965, the issue of handing over the weapons was revisited. Subsequently, President Sukarno sent the commander-in-chief of the Indonesian Air Force, Marshal Omar Dhani, as a military attaché to China to arrange the shipment of the weapons. Secretly, Dhani personally hoped for the Air Force can receive 25,000 units as part of the 100,000 units that Zhou promised for the Fifth Force, citing its use to "arm the workers and peasants around Halim Airbase." Thus on 17 September 1965, after further silent bargaining apart from the main shipment, it is said that a portion of 25,000 of the weapons was agreed to be transferred. However, due to the limited time and opportunity between Omar Dani's visit and the eruption of G30S, logistically it was very difficult for the air force to arrange and receive the delivery of these weapons. In anticipation of the shipment, Subandrio believed that President Sukarno followed through and conceived the idea of forming a Fifth Force to maximize the benefits of the weapons aid. At that time, the armament of the existing four forces (Army, Navy, Air Force, and Police Force) was considered sufficient, thus 40 battalions worth of armament could be used efficiently.

=== Rejection by the army ===
Aidit hoped to see the Fifth force to be an equal part and branch of ABRI, a notion that was supported by Indonesian Islamic Union Party. Aidit's idea caused consternation among the military leadership though it was met with support from the Indonesian Airforce, led by Omar Dhani. The Indonesian Navy led by admiral R. Eddy Martadinata wearily supported the idea. While the Police force was cautious. In response to the idea of the Fifth Force, Ahmad Yani assigned five generals consisting of Major General Siswondo Parman, Major General Soeprapto, Major General MT Haryono, Brigadier General D.I. Panjaitan, and Brigadier General Sutoyo Siswomiharjo to formulate the urgency of forming the Fifth Force. The results of the formulation showed that the formation of the Fifth Force was not an efficient step, which could not only accommodate security activities in the community but could also be relied upon for state defence activities. It was feared that this element would be used by the PKI to seize power, emulating the experience of the Russian and Chinese revolutions. Therefore, the Army leadership rejected the proposal. There was quite a heated closed conflict between the Army and the PKI, especially in anticipation of the national leadership after President Sukarno. It was later mentioned by some that in the conflict, especially Dwikora, the Army was considered less serious in conducting military operations than the Navy and Air Force, which provoked the PKI to form this element as volunteer assistance. Without outwardly confirming or denying their support, General Ahmad Yani and Nasution continued to stall for time. Ahmad Yani called for a stall based on the justification that all people should be armed, not just workers and peasants in the event of Nekolim attacking Indonesia. Also reciting inefficiency with its forming as a people's army for defense that already exist in the form of Civil Defense or Hansip. However according to Siswoyo, a former member of the PKI secretariat's Central Committee, the idea of forming the Fifth Force had been discussed for a long time and involved all Nasakom elements. Thus, the new army would not only contain communists. Siswoyo noted that the PKI agreed that if it were formed, the Fifth Force would be led by a non-PKI officer. That being Major General Achmadi Hadisoemarto nominated by President Sukarno as Chief of Staff, as he was already tasked in inspecting Fifth Force troop files.

Nevertheless, on May 31, 1965, President Sukarno called for the formation of said Fifth Force, operated under ABRI. Soon training began in a swampy area near Halim called Lubang Buaya. It was under the control of Major Sujono, the ground defence commander of the Halim Airbase. Among the participants were members of the PKI-affiliated youth group, Pemuda Rakyat. The PKI itself trained various elements of its organizations in the form of military exercises, although some say that the exercises that PKI elements participated in were actually official exercises for volunteers from both the Nationalist and Religious communities. However, various testimonies from political prisoners mention that the training was actually more attended by Communist elements such as the People's Youth and Gerwani than other elements. Thus, many testimonies from political prisoners, especially former military officers who became political prisoners, who said that many middle-ranking officers who were later implicated in the 30 September Movement who were accused of training communist elements, said that the training was an official volunteer training for Dwikora. In the training for volunteers, witnesses, especially from the Air Force, also expressed their amazement that the training resembled the training of the Communist Chinese Red Army, especially when the marching defile was answered as an element of propriety (gallantry) only.

Finally, the case of illegal arms smuggling from the PRC was alleged later on, especially after the failed September 30 Movement, which was alleged to be an attempt by the PKI to form a fifth army with the help of the PRC. However, this case, which was said to be true during the New Order era, became a questionable part or element of Indonesia's dark history after the 1998 reformation.

== The end of the Fifth Force ==
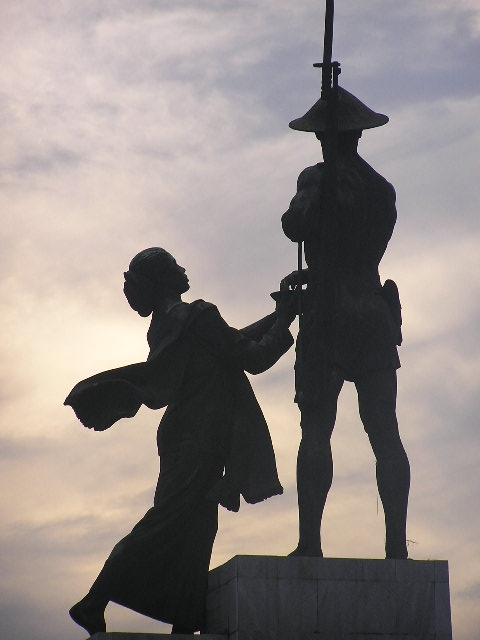
Tugu Tani Monument is often associated with the symbol of the Fifth Force.

After the events of the September 30th Movement, the idea of Fifth Force practically disappeared. The Army with Supersemar finally disbanded the PKI and its organizations, especially those from the People's Youth, Gerwani, Barisan Tani Indonesia, and SOBSI which were allegedly elements of the Fifth Force and made arrests which in the post-1998 reformation era were said to be "purges". Apart from the PKI, the post-Supersemar government of Major General Suharto also arrested military officers who were said to have been involved in the September 30 Movement and trained the "Fifth Force" which was later attributed to the Air Force, which was considered active in supporting President Sukarno's policies.

Some of the volunteers who had been sent to Kalimantan during the Dwikora conflict were also disarmed. In this case, the term Paraku (North Kalimantan People's Army) emerged, which was said to have been suppressed by the Indonesian military and the Malaysian military for resisting.

== See also ==
- Indonesian National Armed Forces Reserve Component
- Indonesian Army
- Indonesian Navy
- Indonesian Air Forces

Similar formations:

- Militia (China)
- People's Militias
- ORMO
- Workers' Militia
- Patriotic Guards
- Worker-Peasant Red Guards
