= Soeprapto (general) =

Indonesian general (1920–1965)

Raden Soeprapto
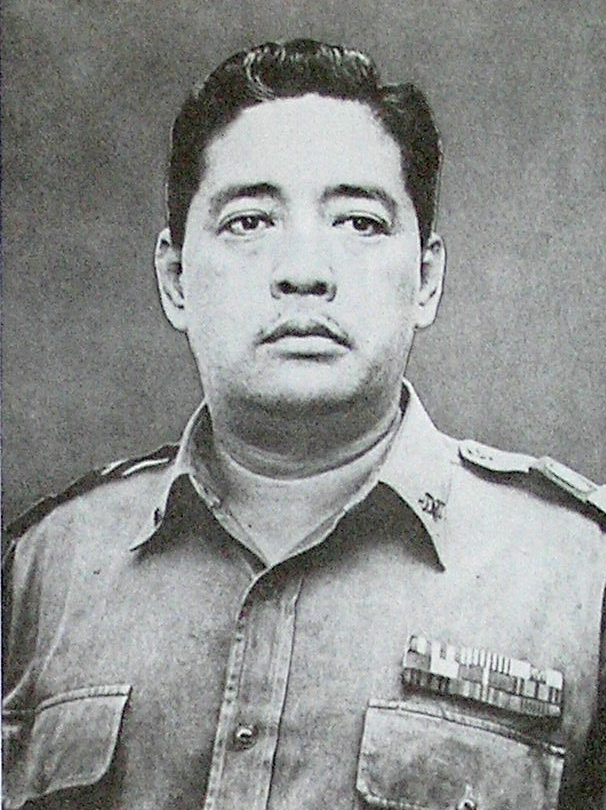
- Born: 20 June 1920; Purwokerto, Banjoemas Residency, Dutch East Indies
- Died: 1 October 1965 (aged 45); Lubang Buaya, East Jakarta, Indonesia
- Burial place: Kalibata Heroes' Cemetery; 6°15′26″S 106°50′46″E
- Military career
- Allegiance: Indonesia
- Service years: 1940–1965

R. Soeprapto (EYD: Suprapto; 20 June 1920 – 1 October 1965) was the Second Deputy Commander of the Indonesian Army, and was kidnapped from his home in Jakarta by members of the 30 September Movement in the early hours of 1 October. He was later killed at Lubang Buaya.

== Early life ==
Soeprapto was born in Purwokerto, Central Java. Starting education at Hollandsch Inlandsche School, continuing to Meer Uitgebreid Lager Onderwijs, and Algemene Middelbare School, in Yogyakarta, after graduating in 1941, continued his education at the Dutch royal military academy in Bandung, but did not graduate as the Japanese invaded. Soeprapto was detained by the Japanese, but managed to escape. Once Soeprapto realized he was not on the wanted list of the Japanese Kempeitai military police, he signed up for military training. When this finished, he worked at the public education office.

== Military career ==
Following the Independence, Soeprapto joined the People's Security Army (TKR), the forerunner of the Indonesian Military. He was involved in the disarming of the recently surrendered Japanese at Cilacap. He was later appointed adjutant to Indonesia's first military commander, General Sudirman, from 1946 to 1947 fighting in the battle of Ambarawa. In September 1949, he became chief of staff of the Diponegoro Division of Central Java, then moved to Army Staff HQ Jakarta in 1951. On 7 May 1960 he was transferred to Medan, North Sumatra and appointed as deputy Army Chief of Staff for Sumatra. His final post was as Second Deputy Army Chief of Staff, which he held from 1 July 1962 until his death.

== Death ==
In the early hours of the morning of 1 October 1965, Soeprapto was not able to sleep due to a toothache, instead he was painting a picture he was working on. Members of the 30 September Movement arrived at Soeprapto's house at Jalan Besuki No. 9, in Jakarta's Menteng district. The kidnappers, members of Tjakrabirawa Presidential Guard, told Soeprapto he was being summoned to appear before President Sukarno. He asked for permission to change his clothes, but was refused, and Soeprapto was taken by truck to Lubang Buaya, the movement's base on the southern outskirts of Jakarta.

His wife was awakened by the family's dogs barking and came into the living room but was forced back by her husband's captors. She was forbidden to use the phone, and rushed to it when the soldiers left but it had been cut. She scribbled a note to send to the residence of her neighbour, lieutenant general Siswondo Parman, to raise the alarm, but she did not know that he had also been seized that morning.

Later that night, Soeprapto was shot to death along with other members of the Army general staff who had survived their kidnapping attempts. All the bodies were thrown into an unused well. The bodies were recovered and all were given a state funeral on 5 October, before being buried at the Heroes' Cemetery, Kalibata. On the same day, via Presidential Decision No. 111/KOTI/1965, President Sukarno declared Soeprapto a Hero of the Revolution.

== Bibliography ==
- Bachtiar, Harsja W. (1988), Siapa Dia?: Perwira Tinggi Tentara Nasional Indonesia Angkatan Darat (Who's Who?: Senior Officers of the Indonesian Army), Penerbit Djambatan, Jakarta, ISBN 979-428-100-X
- Mutiara Sumber Widya (publisher) (1999) Album Pahlawan Bangsa (Albam of National Heroes), Jakarta
- Sekretariat Negara Republik Indonesia (1994) Gerakan 30 September Pemberontakan Partai Komunis Indonesia: Latar Belakang, Aksi dan Penumpasannya (The 30 September Movement/Communist Party of Indonesia: Background, Actions and its Annihilation) ISBN 9790830025
- Sudarmanto, Y.B. (1996) Jejak-Jejak Pahlawan dari Sultan Agung hingga Syekh Yusuf (The Footsteps of Heroes from Sultan Agung to Syekh Yusuf), Penerbit Grasindo, Jakarta ISBN 979-553-111-5
