= Cipayung, East Jakarta =

District in Jakarta, Indonesia

Coordinates: 6°19′S 106°54′E

Cipayung is a district (kecamatan) of East Jakarta, Indonesia, situated in the southeastern part of Jakarta, in the outskirts of Jakarta. Its northern boundary is Pondok Gede Raya Road, its eastern boundary is Sunter River to the East, and its western boundary is Jagorawi Tollway. Marshes can still be found in Cipayung.

There are several recreation places located in Cipayung, including Taman Mini Indonesia Indah, Cibubur scouting complex, and the PKI Betrayal Museum.

== Kelurahan (administrative villages) ==
Cipayung is divided into eight kelurahan or "administrative villages":

- Lubang Buaya - area code 13810
- Ceger - area code 13820
- Cipayung - area code 13840
- Munjul - area code 13850
- Pondok Ranggon - area code 13860
- Cilangkap - area code 13870
- Setu - area code 13880
- Bambu Apus - area code 13890

== List of important places ==
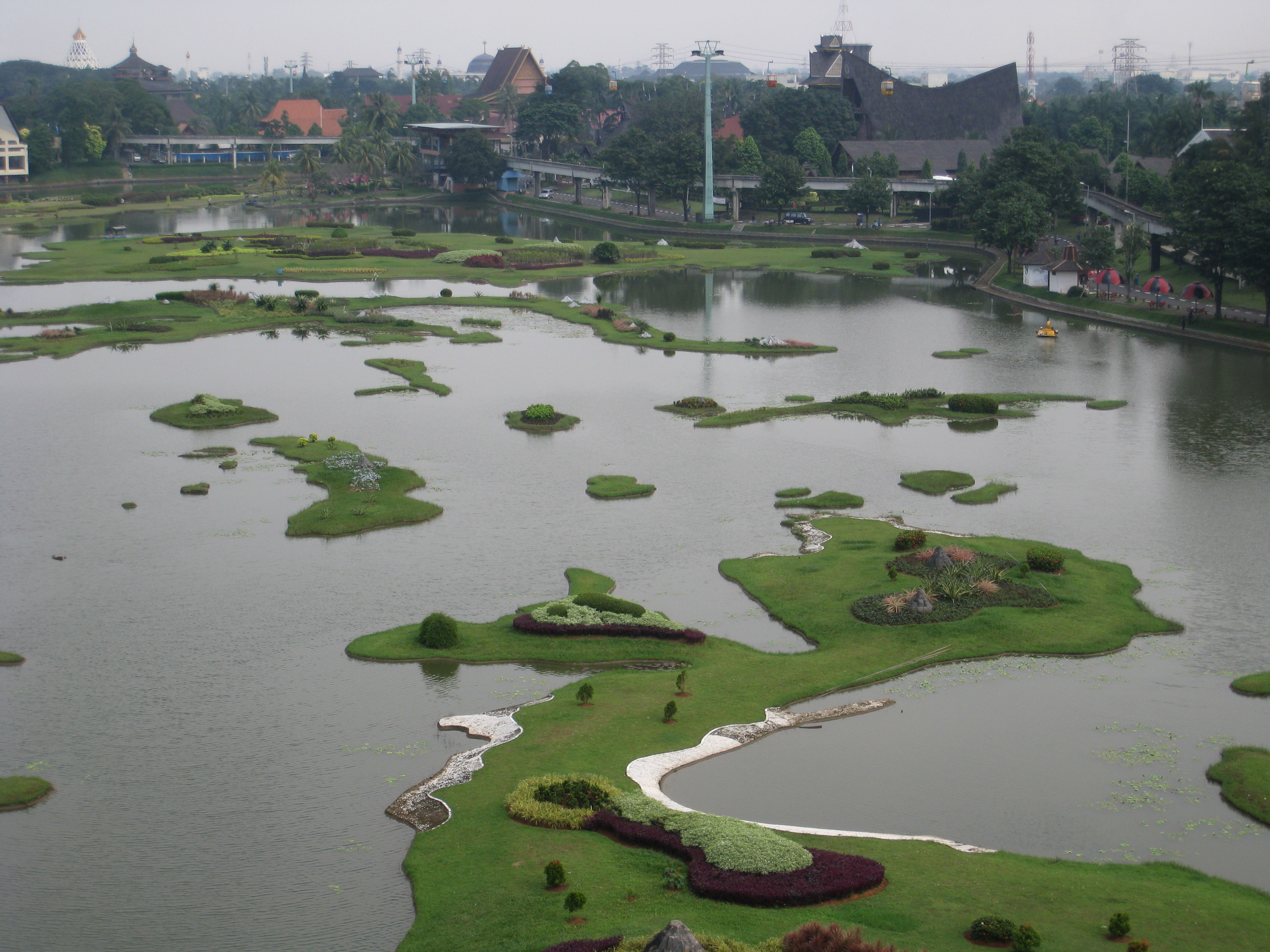
Miniature of Indonesian island in Taman Mini Indonesia Indah

- Arboretum botanical forest
- Museum Pengkhianatan PKI ("PKI Betrayal Museum")
- Pancasila Sakti or Pahlawan Revolusi (Indonesian "Revolution Heroes") Monument
- Scout's camping ground and recreation area (Bumi Perkemahan dan Graha Wisata Pramuka)
- Taman Mini Indonesia Indah
- Indonesian National Badminton Team Headquarters

== Pondok Ranggon Flood Control Lakes ==
In March 2014, construction started on three flood control lakes were built, predicted to be operational before end of the year. Pondok Ranggon Lake I is 11.5 hectares, Lake II is 5 hectares, while Lake III is 2 hectares. The lakes have a total capacity of 550,000. The lakes and surrounding area will be used as recreational area with a garden and pathway.
