= Lubang =

Lubang may refer to:

- Lubang Island, an island in the Philippines
  - Lubang, Occidental Mindoro, a municipality on Lubang Island
- Lubang Buaya, a suburb of Jakarta, Indonesia
