= Mas Tirtodarmo Haryono =

Indonesian general (1924–1965)

Lieutenant General Mas Tirtodarmo Haryono
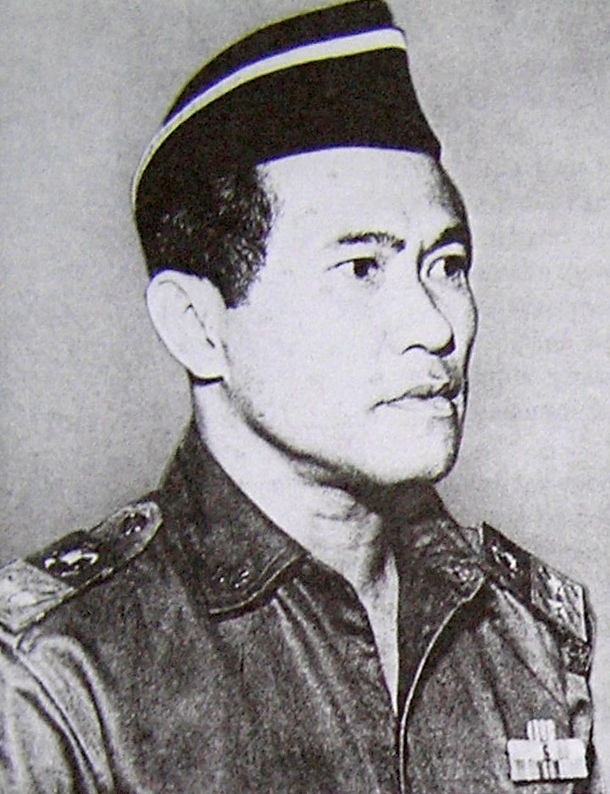
- Born: 20 January 1924; Surabaya, Soerabaja Residency, Dutch East Indies
- Died: 1 October 1965 (aged 41); Lubang Buaya, East Jakarta, Indonesia
- Burial place: Kalibata Heroes' Cemetery; 6°15′26″S 106°50′46″E
- Military career
- Allegiance: Indonesia
- Service years: 1945–1965
- Rank: Major General (at death); Lieutenant General (posthumously)
- Conflicts: Indonesian National Revolution
- Awards: National Hero of Indonesia

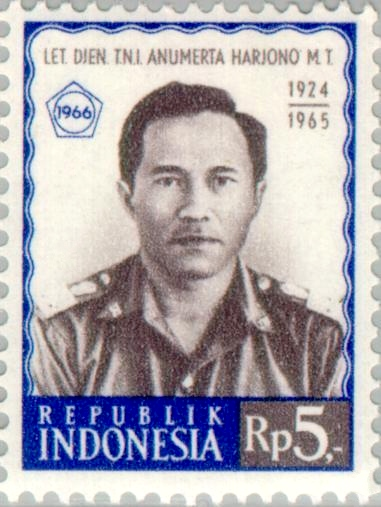
Haryono on a 1966 Indonesian stamp

Lieutenant General Mas Tirtodarmo Haryono (20 January 1924 – 1 October 1965) also known as M.T. Haryono was a general officer in the Indonesian Army who was killed during an attempt to kidnap him from his home by members of the 30 September Movement in the early hours of 1 October 1965.

== Early life ==
Haryono was born in Indonesia's second-largest city, Surabaya, East Java. He was fortunate enough to obtain a standard of education denied to most of his peers, attending an elementary school for European children and then high school in the Dutch East Indies. When the Japanese invaded, he was sent to a Japanese medical school in Jakarta (then Batavia) but did not graduate.

== Career with the Indonesian military ==
Haryono was in Jakarta when Indonesia declared independence. Like many Indonesian youths, Haryono joined other youths to fight the Dutch, then joined the People's Security Army (TKR), the forerunner of the Indonesian Army. Due to his superior education, he was made a major. His command of Dutch, English, and German meant he was in demand during negotiations between Indonesia and the colonial forces. On 1 September 1945, he was appointed Head of the Communication Office in Jakarta. In 1946, he was made secretary to the Indonesian delegation in the negotiations with the Dutch and the British. In November 1949, he also served as the Secretary of the Disarming Section of the Defense Commission at the Dutch-Indonesian Round Table Conference, at which the Dutch agreed to transfer sovereignty to Indonesia. He returned to the Netherlands in July 1950 as military attaché to the Indonesian embassy in the Hague, then on his return to Indonesia in October 1954, he joined the Army General Staff as Army Quartermaster. From August 1962 to 1964 he was Army Inspector General, and in 1963 was also appointed head of the Strategic Materials Section of the Supreme Operational Command (KOTI). His final position, which he took up on 1 July 1964, was Third Deputy to Army Chief of Staff Lieutenant General Ahmad Yani.

== Death ==
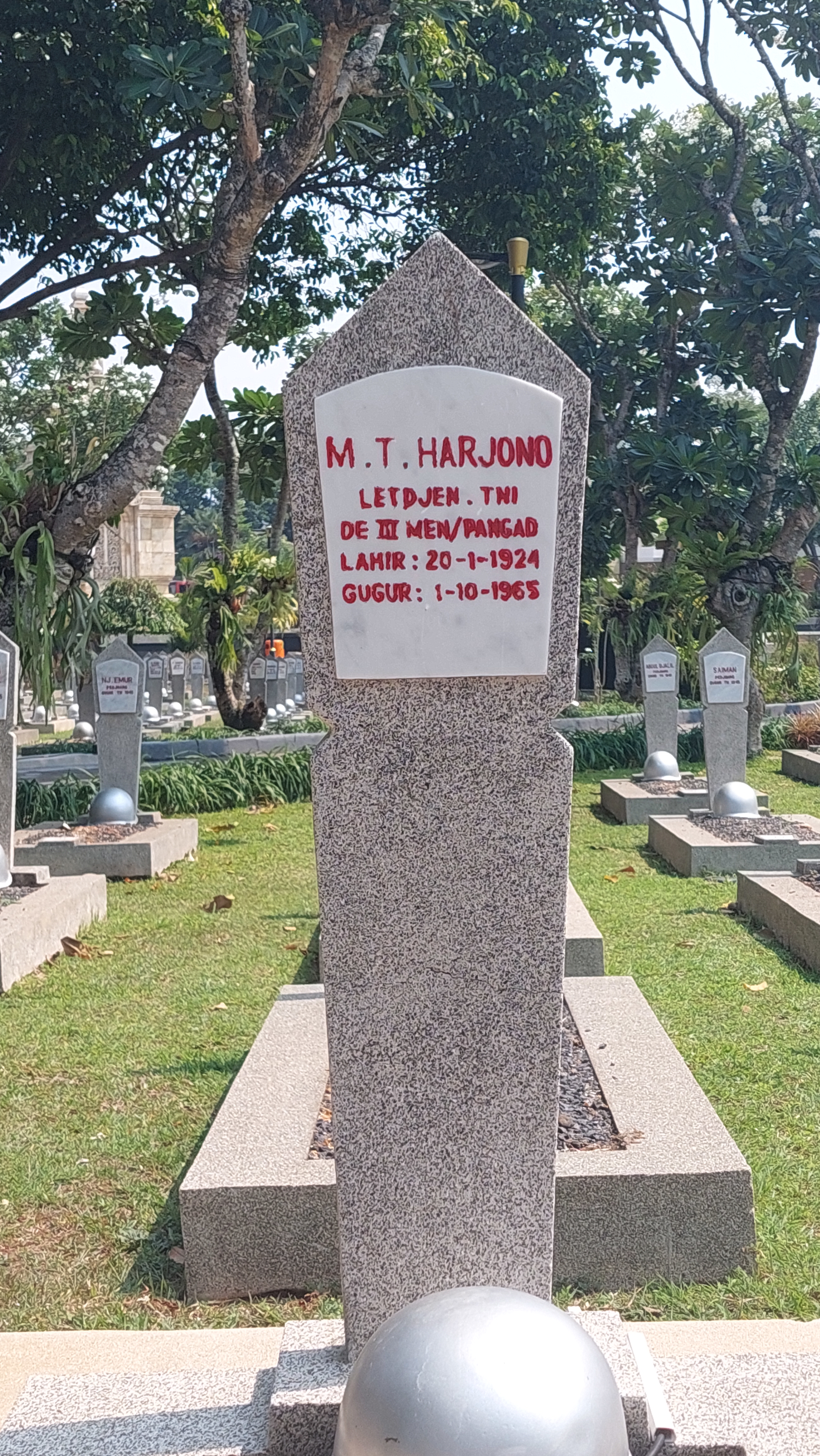
M. T. Haryono's grave at Kalibata Heroes' Cemetery, pictured in October 2023

In the early hours of 1 October 1965, members of the Tjakrabirawa, calling themselves the 30 September Movement, broke into Haryono's home at Jalan Prambanan No. 8. His wife was woken by the group of men who told her that the general had been summoned by President Sukarno. Mrs Haryono returned to the bedroom, locked the door behind her, and told her husband about what happened. She told him not to go, and to tell the guards to return at 8 a.m.

However, Haryono was suspicious and switched off the lights telling his wife to move with their children to an adjoining room. The Tjakrabirawa then fired shots through the locked bedroom door and Haryono jumped to the floor. Hiding, he waited for the first of the attackers who walked into the bedroom carrying a burning newspaper for light. Haryono tried to seize the soldier's gun, but failed and ran out of the door in confusion. He was shot down by a burst from a Sten gun, dragged through the garden, and his body thrown into one of the waiting trucks. His body was taken to Lubang Buaya, the rebel's base on the southern outskirts of Jakarta. There it was dropped into a disused well along with the bodies of the other murdered generals.

All the bodies were recovered on October 4 and the generals were given a state funeral. Haryono was buried with his colleagues at the Kalibata Heroes' Cemetery on 5 October. The same day, by order of President Sukarno, he was posthumously promoted and made a Hero of the Revolution.
