= Arnold Brackman =

American journalist

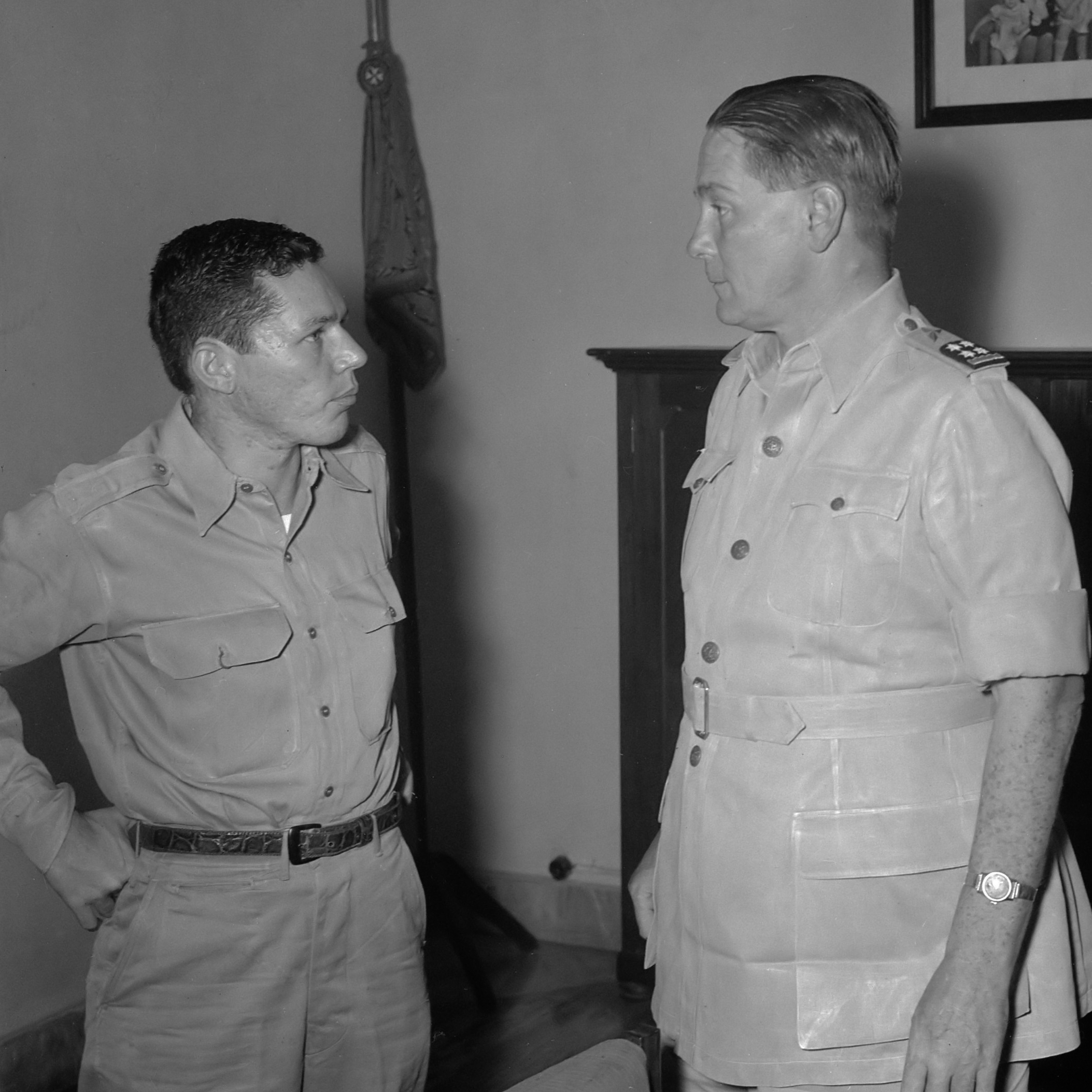
Arnold Brackman (l.) interviewing General Dirk Cornelis Buurman van Vreeden (1947)

Arnold Charles Brackman (March 6, 1923 – November 21, 1983) was an American journalist and author.

Brackman was born in New York City and received his journalism degree from New York University. He became a correspondent for the news agency United Press International and reported on topics of Asia. He was later employed by The Christian Science Monitor and The New York Times. Brackman lived in Brookfield Center, Connecticut, prior to his death.

Brackman established his reputation as a journalist and author from his writings on Asian countries, primarily those in Southeast Asia, and on archaeology. He was a reporter at the Tokyo military tribunals in which Imperial Japanese leaders were tried for crimes committed during World War II. He was quoted calling the 1858 joint presentation of Alfred Russel Wallace and Charles Darwin to the Linnean Society of London "one of the great watersheds in the history of Western civilization".

He was married to Agnes Brackman, and the couple had one daughter.

In 1969, Brackman published The Communist Collapse in Indonesia, a description of the events leading up to and following the 1965 coup in Indonesia. Throughout the 1970s, he was an adjunct professor of journalism at Western Connecticut State University. There is a scholarship, an award, and a laboratory named in his honor.

== Publications ==
- Indonesian Communism: A History (1963)
- The Communist Collapse in Indonesia (1969)
- Read to Succeed (1973)
- The Dream of Troy (1974)
- Indonesia: The Critical Years, 1976-78 (1974)
- The Last Emperor (1975)
- The Search for the Gold of Tutankhamne (1976)
- Luck of Nineveh: Greatest Adventure in Modern Archaeology (1978)
- A Delicate Arrangement: The Strange Case of Charles Darwin and Alfred Russel Wallace (1980)
- The Prisoner of Peking (1980)
- The Other Nuremberg: The Untold Story of the Tokyo War Crimes Trials (1990)
