= D. I. Pandjaitan =

Indonesian general (1925–1965)

Donald Isaac Pandjaitan
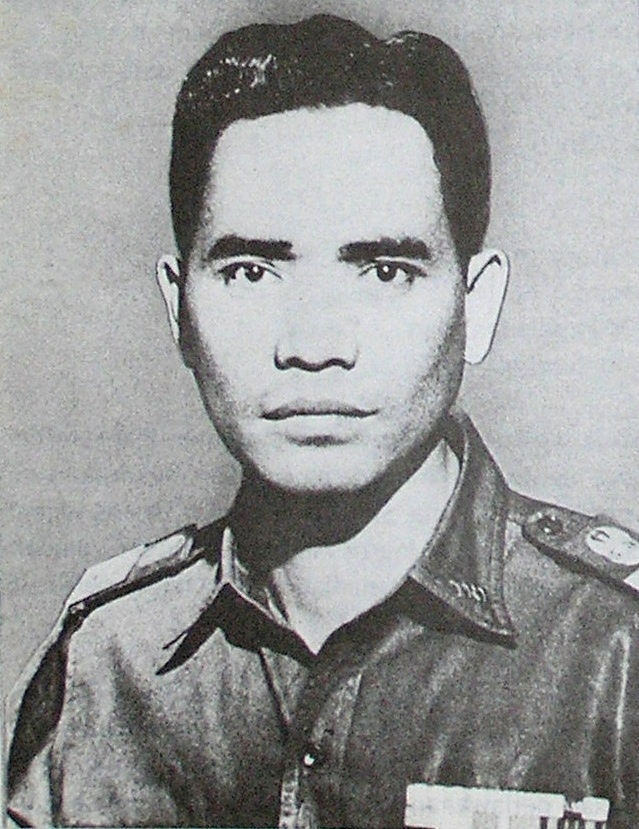
- Born: 9 June 1925; Balige, Tapanoeli Residency, Dutch East Indies
- Died: 1 October 1965 (aged 40); Lubang Buaya, East Jakarta, Indonesia
- Burial place: Kalibata Heroes' Cemetery; 6°15′26″S 106°50′46″E
- Spouse: Marieke br. Tambunan (m. 1946)
- Children: 6
- Military career
- Allegiance: Indonesia (1945–1965)
- Service years: 1945–1965
- Rank: Brigadier General (at death); Major General (posthumously, 1965)
- Nickname: Singer (Note: The code used by Cakrabirawa during the September 30th Movement)
- Commands: I/Bukit Barisan Division APRIS, Medan
- Conflicts: Indonesian National Revolution: Operation Kraai
- Awards: National Hero of Indonesia

Donald Isaac Pandjaitan (Note: Under Indonesian law, a full name is a single personal name with no legal distinction for any family names or inherited names (see Indonesian name). He is formally referred to in Indonesia as "D. I. Pandjaitan," and so the article refers to the individual by the final element of his name.) (Note: His birth name was Donald Isac Pandjaitan, however it was commonly mispronounced as Donald Isaac Pandjaitan. Since 1943, he has been known as Donald Izakus Pandjaitan because that is how his superior, a Japanese businessman, pronounced it. This name was later spelled as Donald Izacus Pandjaitan.) (EYD: Donald Isaac Panjaitan; 9 June 1925 – 1 October 1965) was an Indonesian general who was killed during a kidnapping attempt by the members of the 30 September Movement. Of the six army generals killed in the coup attempt, he was the only Christian.

== Early life ==
D.I. Pandjaitan was born in Silaen, Balige in the Tapanuli region of North Sumatra. After completing elementary and high school, with the arrival of the invading Japanese, he underwent Japanese Giyūgun military education. He was then posted to Pekanbaru, and was there when Indonesian independence was declared on 17 August 1945.

== Military career ==
In November 1945, Pandjaitan, together with other young people, helped establish a local branch of the People’s Security Army (TKR), initially serving as a battalion commander. In March 1948, he was appointed commander for the organization and education of the XI/Banteng Division at Bukittinggi, West Sumatra. Not long after, he became the fourth deputy commander (supplies) for the Sumatran Army Command, then when the Dutch launched their Second Police Action against the republic, he was put in charge of supplies for the Emergency Government of the Republic of Indonesia.

After the Dutch recognition of Indonesian sovereignty in 1949, Pandjaitan was posted to the headquarters of the Sumatran Division in Medan, and on 2 January 1950 became head of the operational staff of the I/Bukit Barisan Division. He was then transferred to Palembang, South Sumatra, and appointed deputy commander of the II/Sriwijaya Division. From October 1952 to July 1957, he served as the military attaché to the Indonesian embassy in Bonn, West Germany. Upon his return to Indonesia, he joined the Army General Staff. He attended a course at the US Army Command and General Staff College at Fort Leavenworth from December 1963 to June 1964. He then took up his final post as fourth assistant to the Army Chief of Staff for logistics and ordnance.

== Death ==
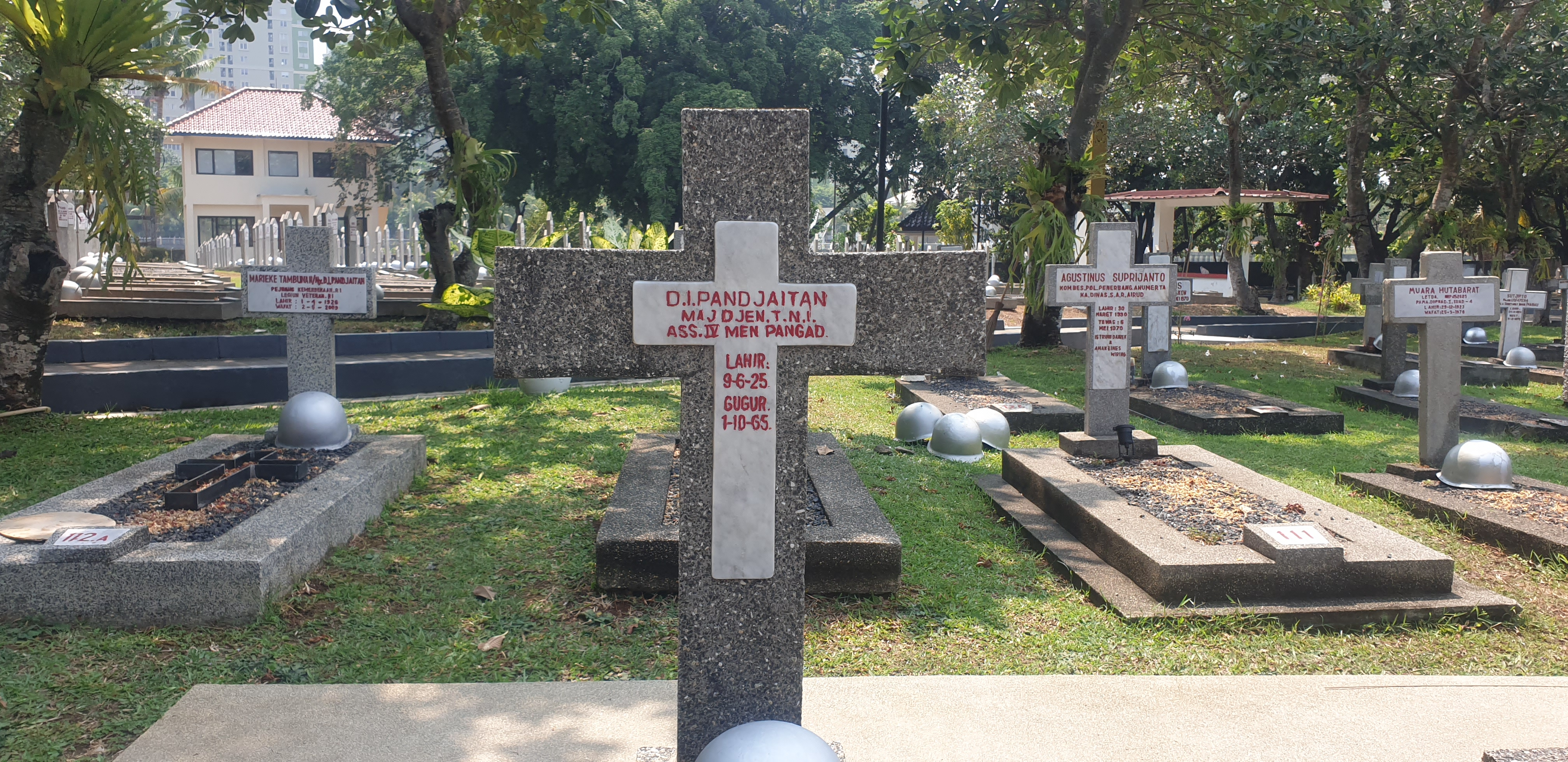
Pandjaitan's grave at Kalibata Heroes' Cemetery, 2023

In the early hours of 1 October 1965, several members of the 30 September Movement left Lubang Buaya on the eastern outskirts of Jakarta to seize key military figures and take them hostage. Pandjaitan was among their targets, so they broke the fence near his house along Jalan Hasanuddin, Kebayoran Baru, South Jakarta. They shot and killed one of the household staff sleeping on the ground floor of Pandjaitan’s two-storey house, before calling on Pandjaitan himself to come down. Two of the men involved at the time were Albert Naiborhu and Viktor Naiborhu, who were seriously injured during the attempted kidnapping, with Albert dying shortly afterward. Pandjaitan, then in full army dress, came from the second floor and allowed himself to be led away, stopping briefly to pray in his front yard. After some minutes of irritatedly waiting for Pandjaitan to finish prayers, his captors lost their patience and shot him dead from behind.

His body was put in a truck and brought to the movement’s headquarters at Lubang Buaya. His body, along with those of his colleagues who had also been killed, were thrown down a nearby disused well. The bodies were found on 4 October, and all were given a state funeral the following day. Pandjaitan, along with the other victims, are buried at the Kalibata Heroes’ Cemetery in South Jakarta. Pandjaitan was posthumously promoted to major general and awarded the title Hero of the Revolution.
