= Nekolim =

Political neologism and concept

Nekolim is a neologism and concept introduced by Indonesian President Sukarno used to describe "the enforced conditions of imperial control without formal rule." It derives from the combination of the terms neocolonialism, colonialism and imperialism (in Indonesian, spelled NEokolonialisme-KOLonialisme-IMperialisme). This term was used by Sukarno in his speech at the 1960 Bandung Conference after Indonesia was liberated from Japanese occupation following World War II to describe imperial interests of Western powers, including the Netherlands and the United States.

Qualities that distinguish nekolim from related concepts involve the intentional restructuring of a country in order to make it dependent upon a foreign power, often economically and culturally. Once this is achieved, force is not needed because independence becomes infeasible for the dominated country. Likewise, nekolim leads to the establishment of puppet governments in exploited regions to remove the need for traditional military control of a country. Sukarno's criticisms made of US involvement in Indonesia which he deemed to be "nekolim practices" are largely entailed by the modern understanding of the concept of neocolonialism.

== Nekolim in Indonesia ==
During Sukarno's administration, there were several alleged instances of nekolim being imposed by the US on Indonesia, such as through economic aid which purportedly caused Indonesia's national economy to become dependent on the US, and through cultural and scientific cooperation that purportedly prevented the development of national culture and knowledge. In response to these practices, Sukarno opposed nekolim by promoting the Berdikari (meaning standing on one's own feet) Movement and advocating for the principle of national personality.

Sukarno's efforts at disrupting nekolim were interrupted after a CIA-backed coup against the Sukarno administration resulted in the Indonesian anticommunist mass killings of 1965-66. These killings have been described by some scholars as a genocide and caused an estimated 500,000 to over 1,000,000 deaths. It has been referred to by one reporter as the "biggest US-backed genocide". After Sukarno's administration was overthrown, it was replaced by that of pro-American President Suharto.

During Suharto's administration, nekolim practices allegedly re-emerged. Citing Indonesia's economic downturn at the time, Suharto agreed to accept loans from the International Monetary Fund and the World Bank. This led to bilateral political agreements for the United States and Europe to control Indonesia's natural resources through the establishment of the General Agreement on Tariffs and Trade (renamed the World Trade Organization). Another form of nekolim that allegedly emerged in Indonesia was the large amount of foreign capital entering the country in the form of foreign companies or domestic companies that have been privatized. The emergence of these companies taught the Indonesian people the "perspective" that parties with large capital will push out those with smaller capital.
