= 30 September Movement =

1965 Indonesian military faction that attempted a coup

- Part of the Cold War in Asia, Konfrontasi and the transition to the New Order
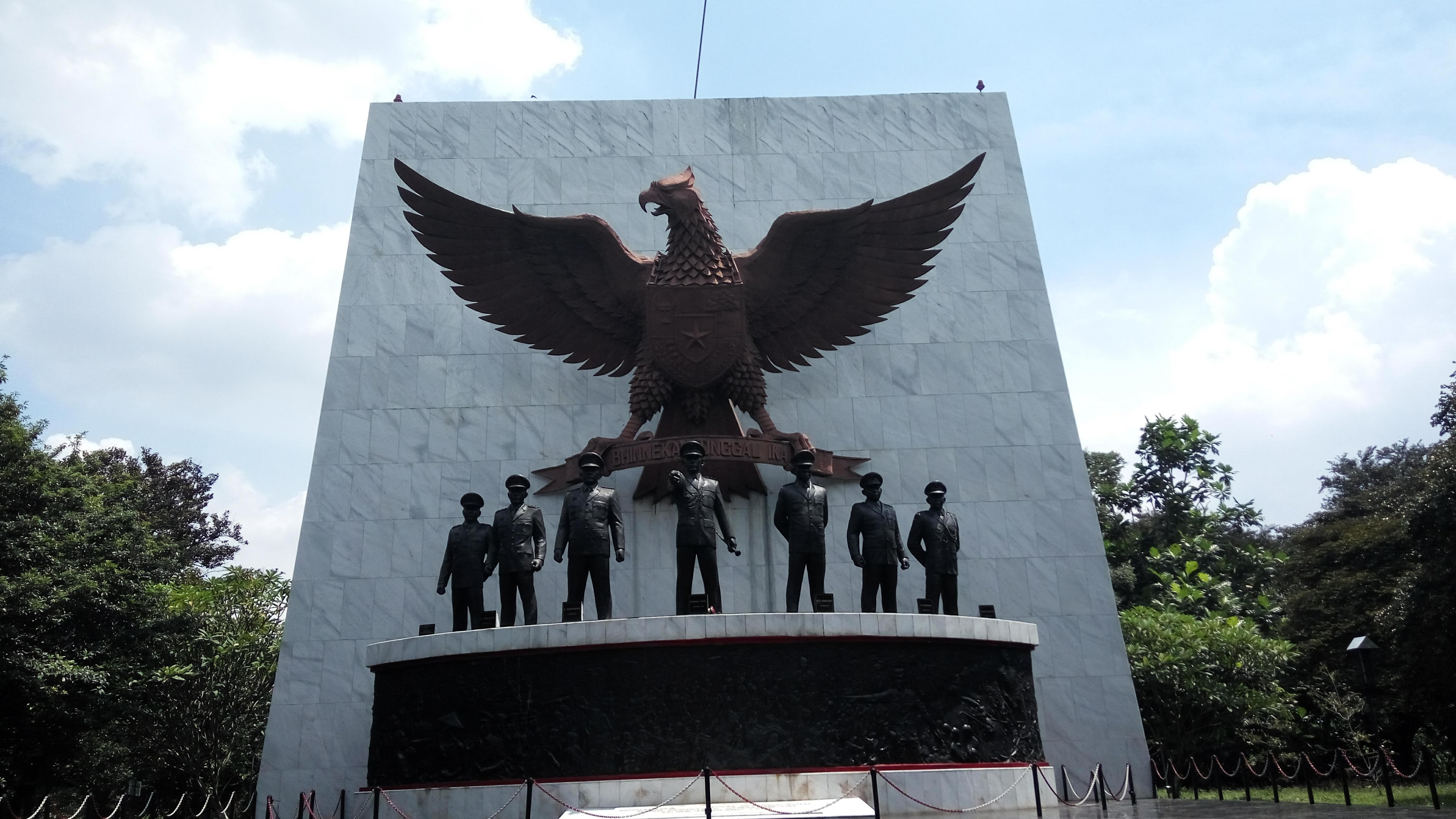
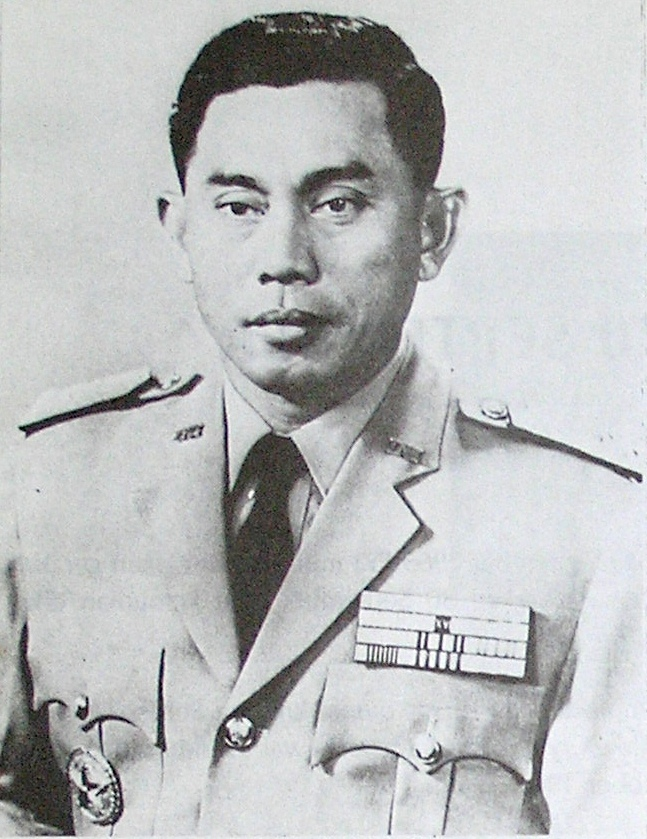
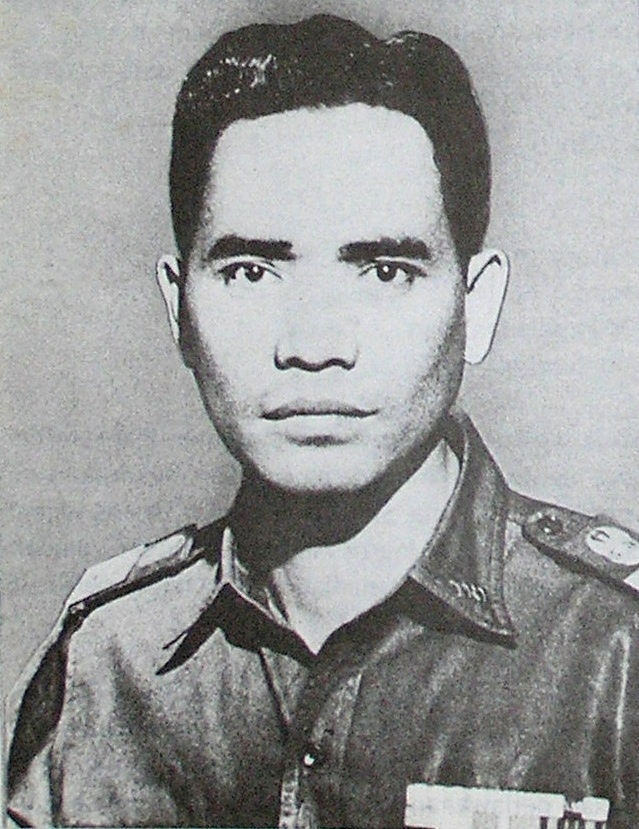
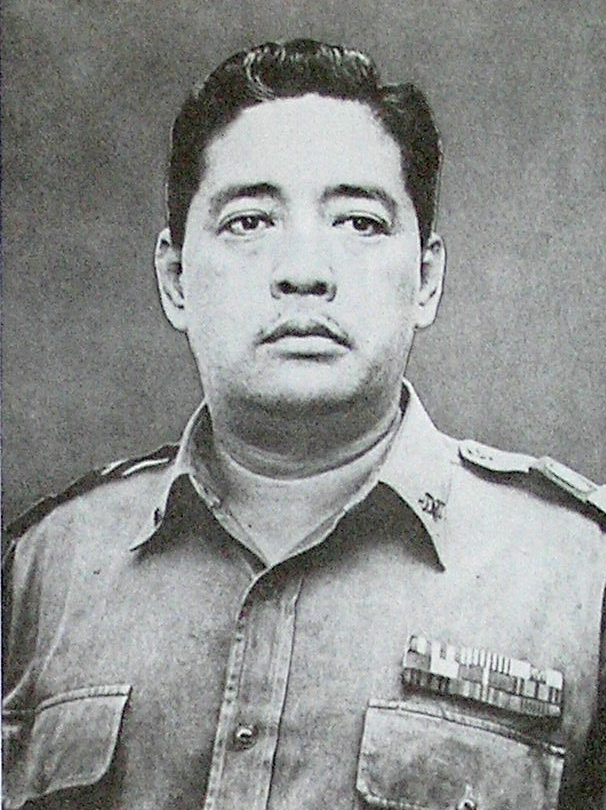
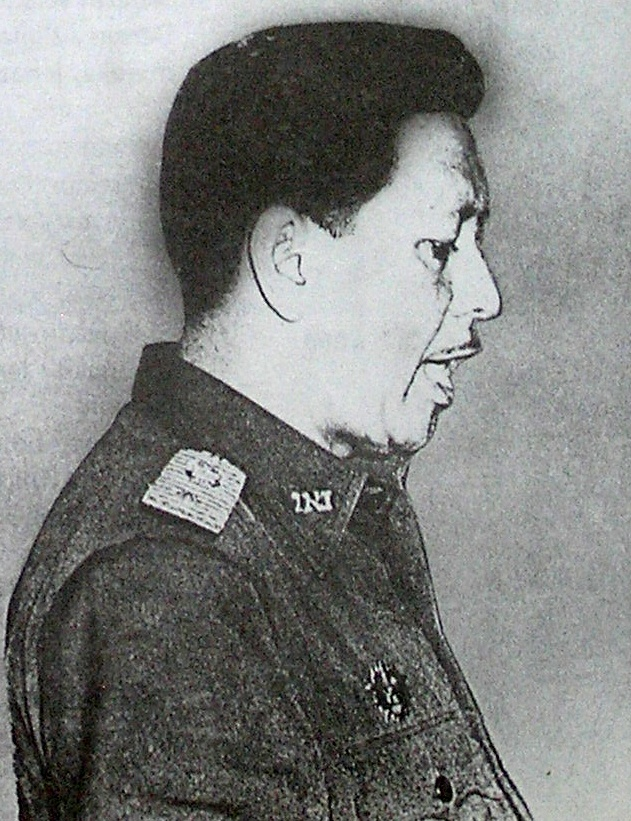
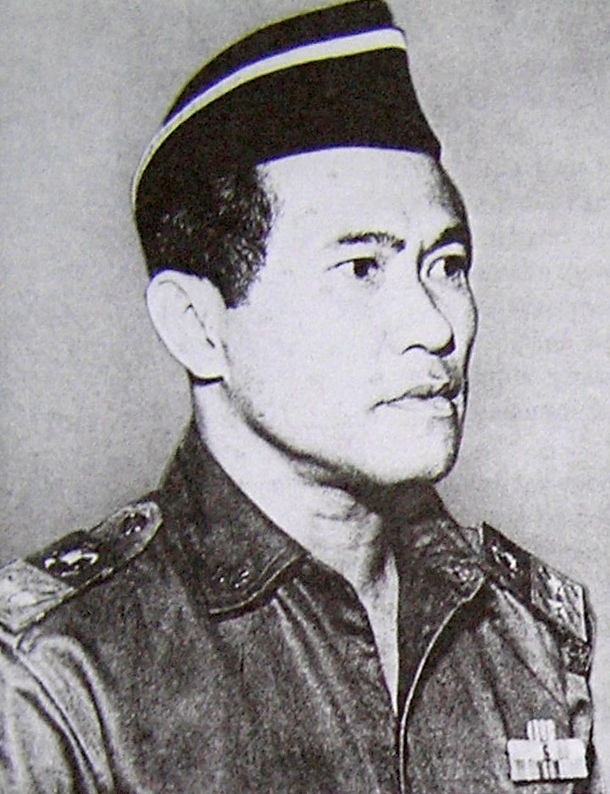
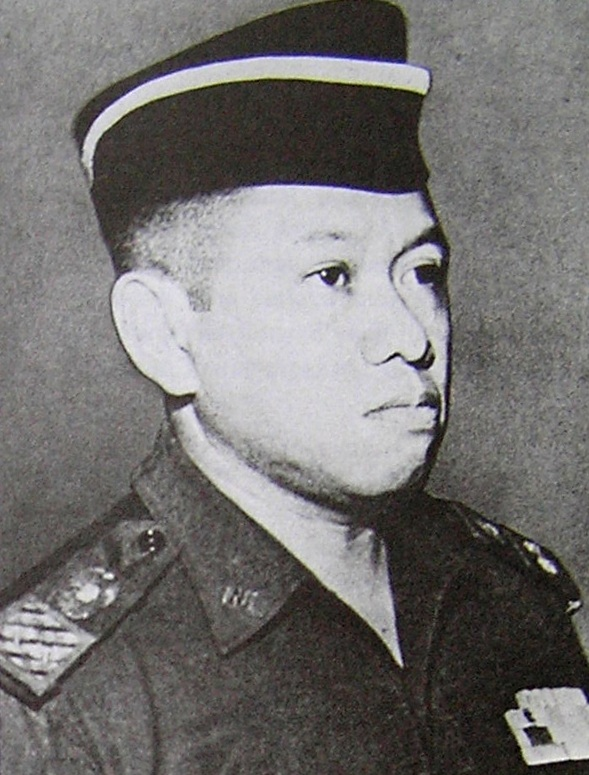
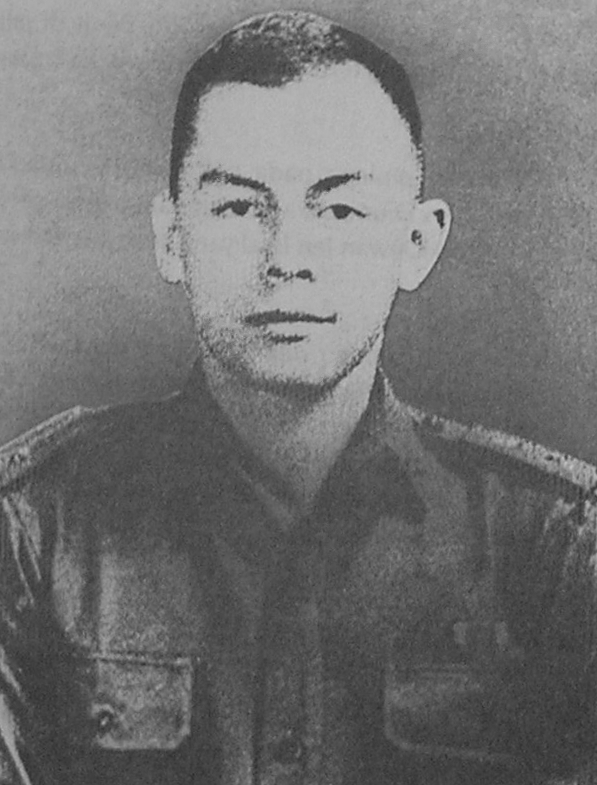
- Pancasila Sakti Monument Victims found in Lubang Buaya. From left to right: General Ahmad Yani, Brigadier General D. I. Pandjaitan, Major General R. Suprapto. Brigadier General Sutoyo Siswomiharjo, Major General M. T. Haryono, Major General S. Parman, First Lieutenant Pierre Tendean.
Date	1 October 1965; 61 years ago
Location	Jakarta and Java, Indonesia
Result	Coup attempt failed; Outbreak of anti-communist purge in Indonesia; Sukarno and Guided Democracy starts to fall; Suharto begins to rise to power and start the New Order; PKI and "Communism/Marxism-Leninism" simultaneously banned in a 1966 MPRS session

Belligerents
30 September Movement; Elements of Tjakrabirawa; Communist Party of Indonesia (Disputed); Special Bureau of the Communist Party of Indonesia; Fifth Force Militias in Lubang Buaya; Elements of Indonesian Air Force (Suspected, denied by the Air Force)	Government of Indonesia; Indonesian Army (Loyalist factions)

Commanders and leaders
Untung Syamsuri (executed); Soepardjo (executed) D. N. Aidit (executed); Kamaruzaman Sjam (executed); Supono "Pono" Marsudidjojo (executed); Njono (executed); Utomo Ramelan (executed)	(Indonesia) Sukarno Suharto; A. H. Nasution (WIA); Sarwo Edhie Wibowo; Umar Wirahadikusumah

Casualties and losses
- Six Indonesian Army commanders killed during the coup, along with other military and civilian casualties.

The Thirtieth of September Movement (Indonesian: Gerakan 30 September, also known as G30S, and by the syllabic abbreviation Gestapu for Gerakan September Tiga Puluh, Thirtieth of September Movement, also unofficially called Gestok, for Gerakan Satu Oktober, or First of October Movement) was a coup movement allegedly orchestrated by the leaders of the Communist Party of Indonesia (PKI) and its sympathizers within the Indonesian military.

In the early hours of 1 October 1965 in Jakarta, G30S assassinated six Indonesian Army generals, including the Commander of the Army Ahmad Yani, in an abortive coup d'état. The Coordinating Minister for Defense and Security, General Abdul Haris Nasution, survived the assassination attempt in his house after being urged to escape by his wife, and he jumped into the residence of the Iraqi ambassador next door. But his lieutenant Pierre Tendean was killed while trying to protect the general by claiming he was Nasution. Ade Irma Suryani, Nasution's daughter, was also shot during the chaos and died a few days later.

Later that morning, the organization declared that it was in control of media and communication outlets and claimed to have taken President Sukarno under its protection. During that chaotic morning, Sukarno decided to go to Halim Perdana Kusuma Airport, and eventually rejected giving his support to G30S. Meanwhile Suharto, alongside Nasution and other military officials, managed to suppress G30S in Jakarta. By the end of the day, the coup attempt had failed in the nation's capital. The leader of PKI, D.N. Aidit, who was also at Halim Airport during the coup attempt, decided to escape to Yogyakarta on 2 October 1965.

The bodies of the slain military officers in Jakarta were thrown into a well in Lubang Buaya, near Halim Airport. Suharto was involved in the evacuation process of the bodies on 4 October. The funeral procession for the seven military officers, known as Pahlawan Revolusi (Heroes of the Revolution), was held on 5 October 1965. At that time, Kompas described the funeral as being witnessed by a sea of people in Jakarta. Sukarno was notably absent from the funeral.

In the days and weeks that followed, the army, socio-political, and religious groups blamed the coup attempt on the Communist Party of Indonesia (PKI). Soon a mass purge was underway, resulting in the imprisonment and deaths of many actual or suspected Communist Party members and sympathizers. According to most estimates, at least between 500,000 to 1 million people were killed, with higher estimates reaching 2 to 3 million.

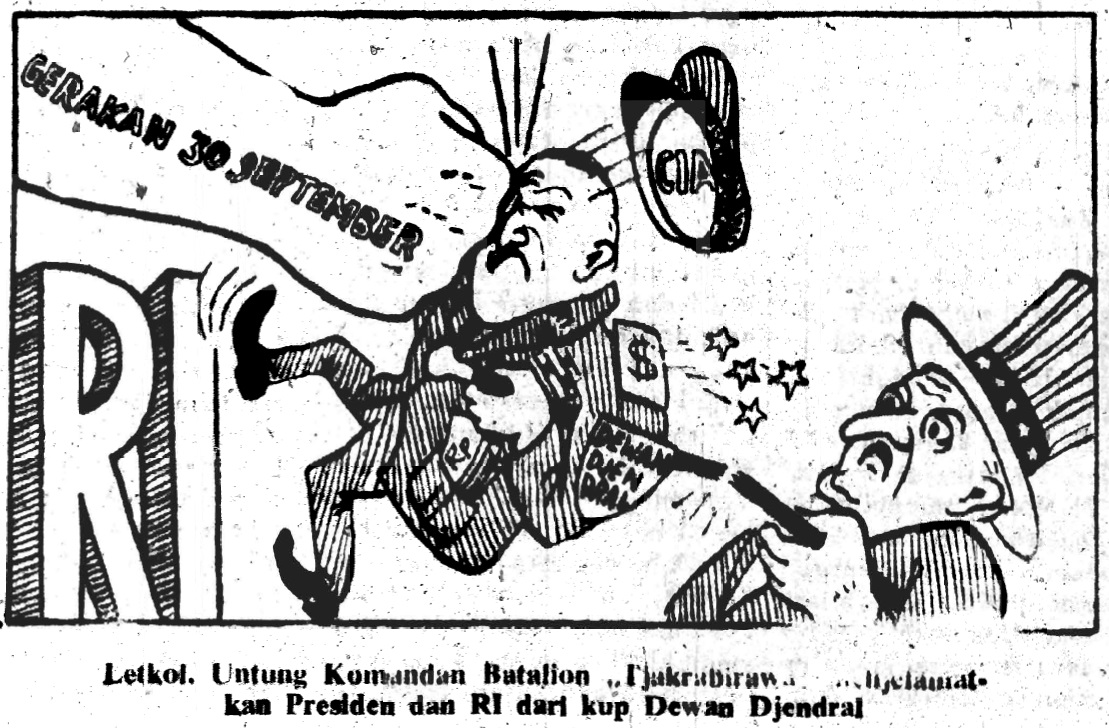
The editorial cartoon from the front page of the PKI newspaper Harian Rakjat, 2 October 1965

Investigations and questioning of Suharto's version of the events were long obstructed in Indonesia. While the Central Intelligence Agency (CIA) initially believed that Sukarno orchestrated the entire coup, several outside sources found inconsistencies and holes in Indonesian army claims, notably Benedict Anderson and Ruth McVey, who wrote the Cornell Paper that challenged it.

== Background ==
From the late 1950s, President Sukarno's position depended on balancing the opposing and increasingly hostile forces of the army and the PKI. His "anti-imperialist" ideology made Indonesia increasingly dependent on the Soviet Union and particularly China.

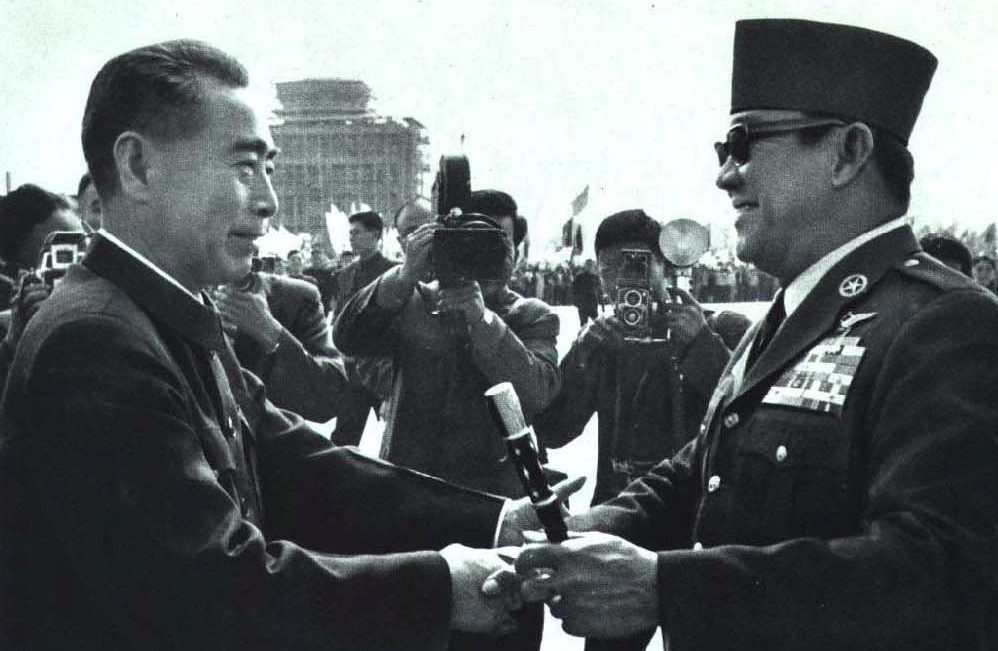
The closeness of Sukarno and Zhou Enlai in 1964

In the 1960s, the conflict between the army and the PKI intensified when the PKI asked President Sukarno to support the establishment of a Angkatan kelima, a left-wing militia of workers and peasants armed primarily to support the ongoing confrontation with Malaysia. This proposal was opposed by the army generals of the TNI because they feared that the PKI would become a fifth column as a military militia against the TNI if a civil war occurred. The force itself had been trained by the Indonesian Air Force at Lubang Buaya near its headquarters at Halim Perdanakusuma Airport.

By 1965, at the height of the Cold War, the PKI had extensively penetrated all levels of government. With the support of Sukarno and the air force, the party gained increasing influence at the expense of the army, thus ensuring the army's enmity. By late 1965, the army was divided between a left-wing faction allied with the PKI and a right-wing faction that was being courted by the United States.

In need of Indonesian allies in its Cold War against the Soviet Union, the United States cultivated a number of ties with officers of the military through exchanges and arms deals. This fostered a split in the military's ranks, with the United States and others backing a right-wing faction against a left-wing faction leaning towards the PKI.

== Insurgency on 1 October ==
=== Kidnapping and murder of generals ===
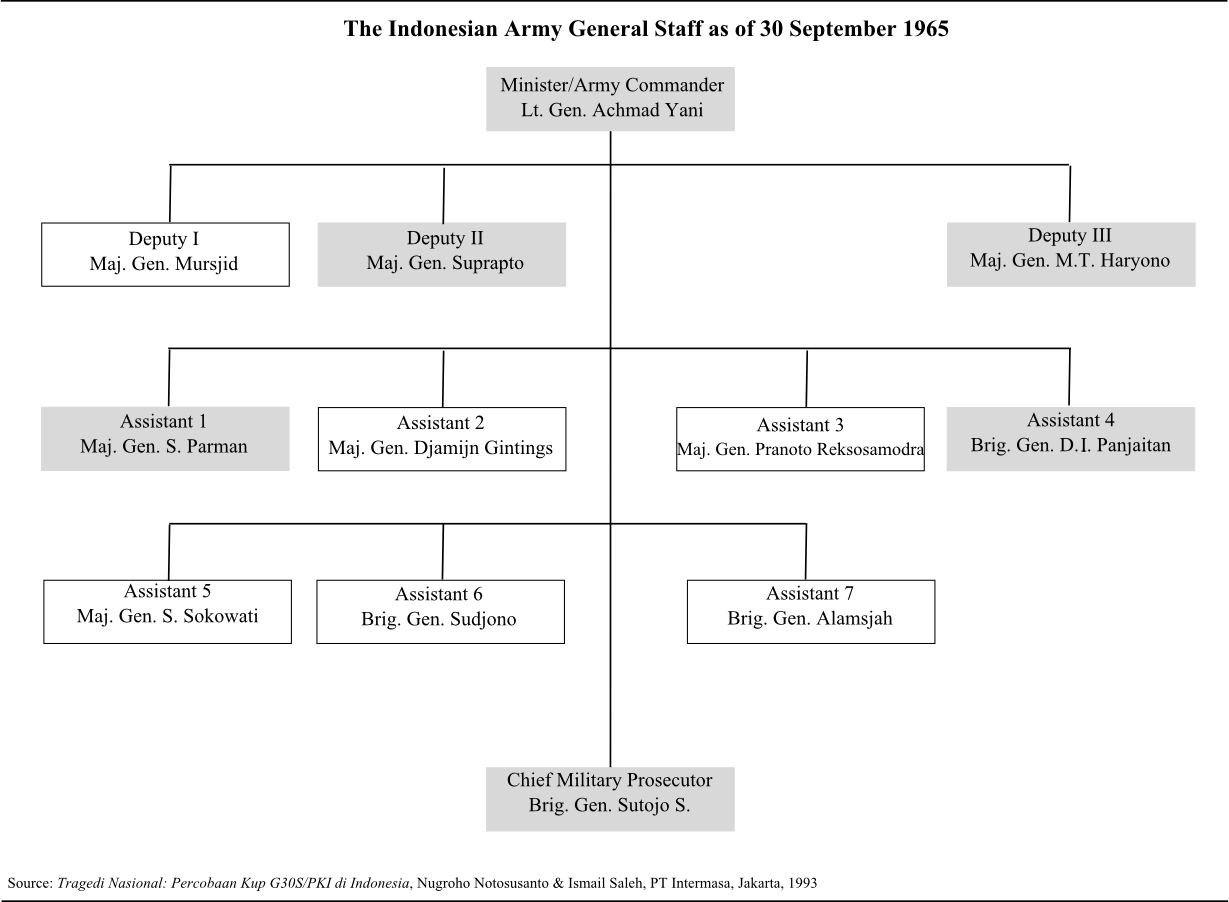
The Army General Staff at the time of the coup attempt. The generals who were killed are shown in grey.

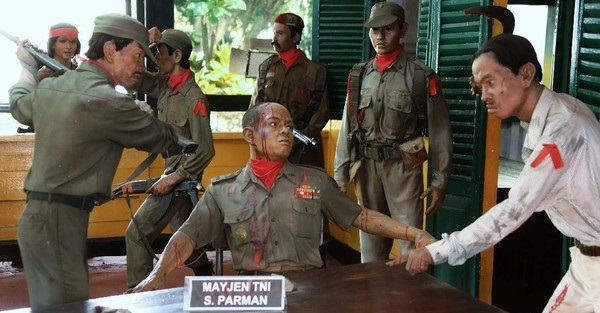
The diorama depicts S. Parman being interrogated and tortured by members of the 30 September Movement in Lubang Buaya Museum

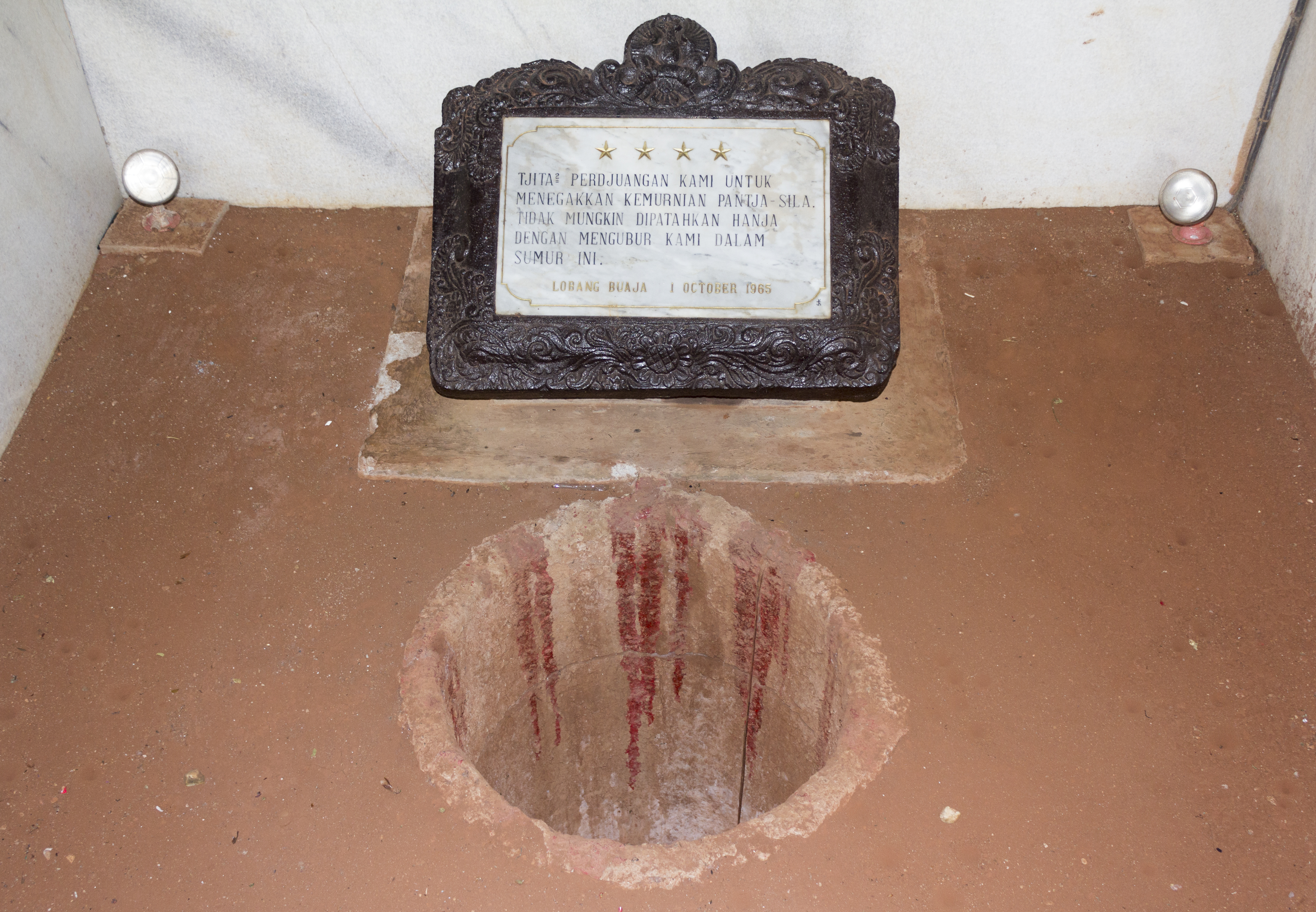
The well where the bodies of the 6 generals and 1 officer who were victims of the 30 September Movement were dumped

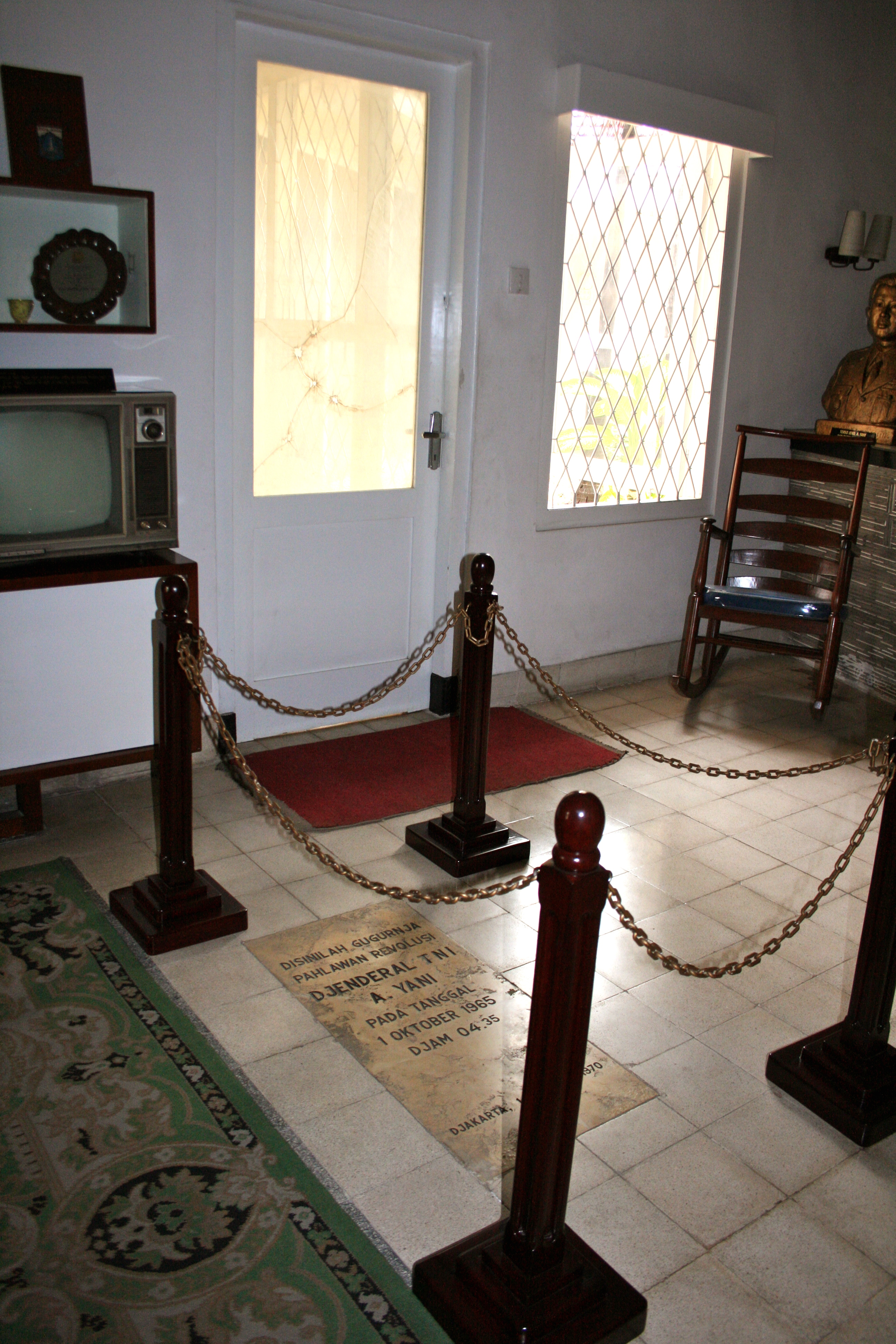
Plaque at the home of former TNI Commander Ahmad Yani marking the spot where he died after being shot by Tjakrabirawa through a glass door (note the bullet holes on the glass panel of the door)

At around 3:15 am on 1 October, seven detachments of troops in trucks and buses dispatched by Lieutenant Colonel Untung Syamsuri (commander of Tjakrabirawa, the presidential guard), comprising troops from the Tjakrabirawa Regiment (Presidential Guards), the Diponegoro (Central Java), and Brawijaya (East Java) Divisions, left the movement's base at Halim Perdanakusumah Air Force Base, just south of Jakarta to kidnap seven generals, all members of the Army General Staff. Three of the intended victims, (Minister/Commander of the Army Lieutenant General Ahmad Yani, Major General M. T. Haryono, and Brigadier General D. I. Pandjaitan) were killed at their homes, while three more (Major General Soeprapto, Major General S. Parman, and Brigadier General Sutoyo) were taken alive.

Ahmad Yani famously slapped a Cakrabirawa soldier before he was shot. During the encounter, a Cakrabirawa soldier told Ahmad Yani that he was summoned by President Sukarno. Yani was willing to go but he wanted to take a bath first, however another soldier denied him that request. Ahmad Yani was furious and slapped that soldier on the face.

Meanwhile, their main target, Coordinating Minister for Defense and Security and Armed Forces Chief of Staff, General Abdul Haris Nasution managed to escape the kidnap attempt by jumping over a wall into the Iraqi embassy garden. However his personal aide, First Lieutenant Pierre Tendean, was captured after being mistaken for Nasution in the dark. Nasution's five-year-old daughter, Ade Irma Suryani Nasution, was shot by the assault group and died on 6 October. In addition a police officer guarding Nasution's neighbor Johannes Leimena, Police Chief Brigadier Karel Sadsuitubun, was shot and killed by the kidnapping group. A final victim was Albert Naiborhu, General Pandjaitan's nephew, who was killed during the raid on the General's home. The generals and the bodies of their dead colleagues were taken to a place known as Lubang Buaya near Halim where those still alive were shot dead. The bodies of all the victims were then thrown down a disused well near the base.

=== Takeover in Jakarta ===
Later that morning, around 1,000 troops from two Java-based divisions (the 454th Infantry Battalion from the Diponegoro Division and the 530th Infantry Battalion from the Brawijaya Division) occupied Lapangan Merdeka, the park around the National Monument in central Jakarta, and three sides of the square, including the Radio Republik Indonesia (RRI) main building and studios. They did not occupy the east side of the square – the location of the armed forces strategic reserve (KOSTRAD) headquarters, commanded at the time by Major General Suharto. At some time during the night, D. N. Aidit, the Communist Party of Indonesia (PKI) leader, and the Commander of the Indonesian Air Force and Minister of the Air Force, Air Marshal Omar Dani, both went to the Halim AFB, which pointed to their involvement in the movement.

Following the news at 7 am, RRI broadcast a message from Lieutenant Colonel Untung Syamsuri, commander of the 1st Honor Guard Battalion (Army), Tjakrabirawa Regiment, to the effect that the 30 September Movement, an internal Indonesian Army organization, had taken control of strategic locations in Jakarta, with the help of other military units. They proclaimed that this was to forestall a coup attempt by a 'Generals' Council' aided by the Central Intelligence Agency, intent on removing Sukarno on the upcoming 20th Armed Forces Day, 5 October. It was also stated that President Sukarno was under the movement's protection. Sukarno traveled to Halim 'after learning that there were troops near the Palace on the north side of Lapangan Merdeka' and also claimed (later) 'that this was so he could be near an aircraft should he need to leave Jakarta'. Further radio announcements from RRI later that day listed 45 members of the G30S Movement and stated that all army ranks above Lieutenant Colonel would be abolished. While at Halim, the president met with Deputy Prime Minister Johannes Leimena and the navy and police commanders, along with the attorney general and the palace guard chief to plan for a replacement to the post of Commander of the Army which was by now vacant.

=== The end of the movement in Jakarta ===
At 5.30 am, Suharto, commander of the Army's Strategic Reserve (KOSTRAD), was woken up by his neighbor and told of the disappearances of the generals and the shootings at their homes. He went to Kostrad HQ and tried to contact other senior officers. He managed to contact and to ensure the support of the commanders of the Navy and the National Police, but was unable to contact the Air Force Commander. He then took command of the Army and issued orders confining all troops to their barracks.

Because of poor planning, the coup leaders had failed to provide provisions for the troops on Lapangan Merdeka, who were becoming hot and thirsty. They were under the impression that they were guarding the president in the palace. Over the course of the afternoon, Suharto persuaded both battalions to give up without a fight, first the Brawijaya battalion, who came over to Kostrad HQ, then the Diponegoro troops, which withdrew to Halim. His troops gave Untung's forces inside the radio station an ultimatum and they also withdrew. By 7 pm Suharto was in control of all the installations previously held by the 30 September Movement's forces. Now joined by Nasution, at 9 pm he announced over the radio that he was now in command of the Army and that he would destroy the counter-revolutionary forces and save Sukarno. He then issued another ultimatum, this time to the troops at Halim. Later that evening, Sukarno left Halim and arrived in Bogor, where there was another presidential palace.

Most of the rebel troops fled, and after a minor battle in the early hours of 2 October, the Army regained control of Halim, Aidit flew to Yogyakarta and Dani to Madiun before the soldiers arrived.

=== Events in Central Java ===
Following the 7 am radio broadcast on RRI, troops from the Diponegoro Division in Central Java took control of five of the seven battalions and other units in the name of the 30 September movement. The PKI mayor of Solo, Utomo Ramelan, issued a statement in support of the movement. Rebel troops in Yogyakarta, led by Major Muljono, kidnapped and later killed Col. Katamso and his chief of staff Lt. Col. Sugiyono. However, once news of the movement's failure in Jakarta became known, most of its followers in Central Java gave themselves up. On 5 October, both Katamso and Sugiyono, the commander and executive officer of the 72nd Military Area at the time of their murders, were also posthumously named Heroes of the Revolution by Sukarno, also in his capacity of Commander of KOTI.

== Aftermath ==
=== Funeral ===
On 4 October, the bodies of all seven casualties were recovered from the well in which they were thrown at Lubang Buaya. They were buried in a state funeral on 5 October, Armed Forces Day, preceded by an address by Nasution.

All seven Army officers and the police brigadier were, by order of President Sukarno in his capacity as the Commander of the Supreme Operations Command (Panglima Komando Operasi Tertinggi/Panglima KOTI), (Note: "Supreme Operations Command" (Komando Operasi Tertinggi, KOTI) here referred to the then-ongoing Indonesia–Malaysia confrontation.) officially declared the very same day as Heroes of the Revolution posthumously per Decree of the President/Commander of KOTI No. 111/KOTI/1965.

President Sukarno himself did not attend the funeral. Minister for Foreign Affairs Subandrio acted as the ceremony inspector for the funeral, and General Nasution was reportedly bowing in front of Pierre Tendean's body as a gesture of respect for his loyalty and sacrifice.

=== Anti-communist purge ===
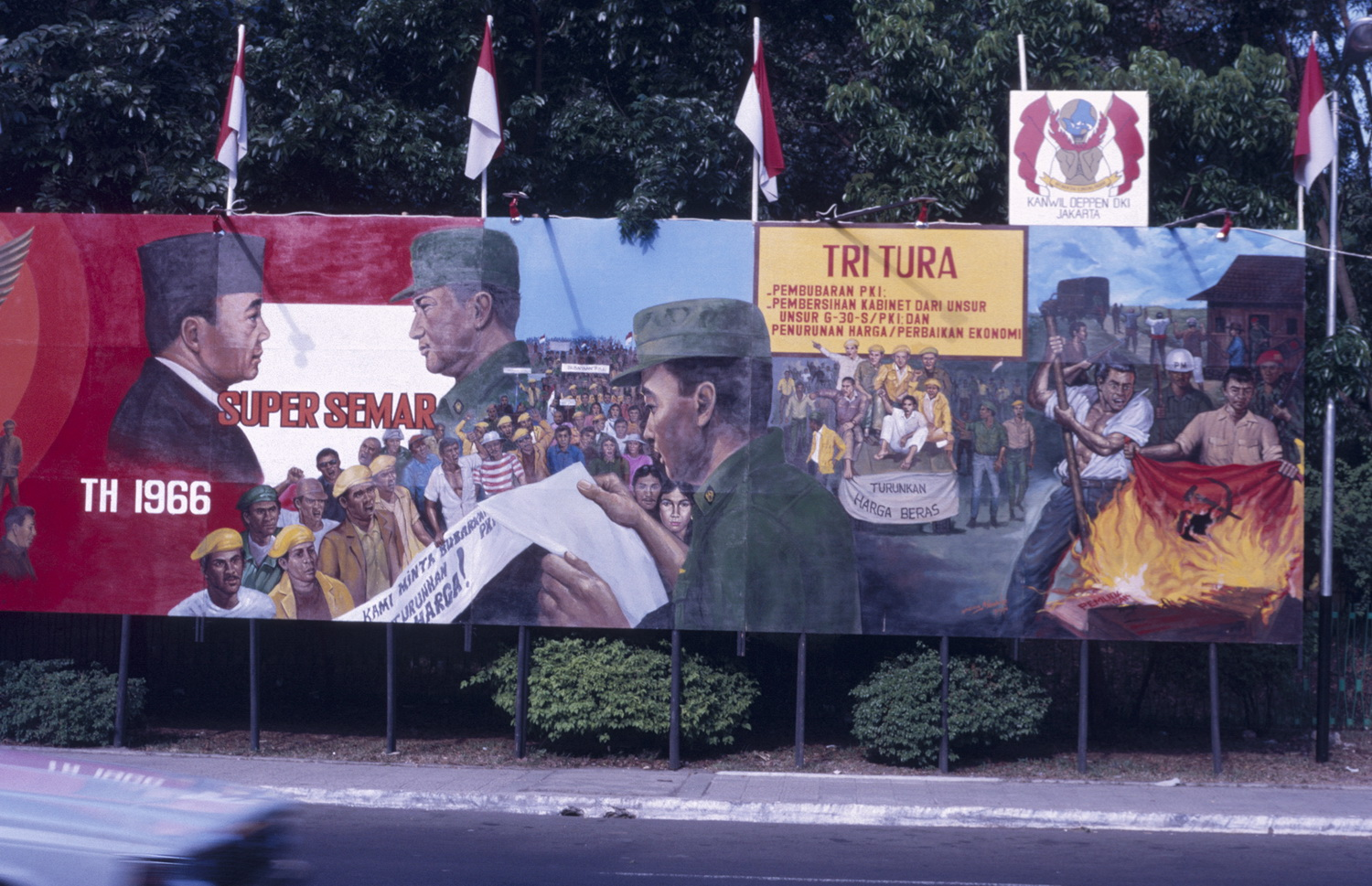
Tritura image, namely the post-1965 incident where the people began to support Suharto's rule due to Sukarno siding with the communists.

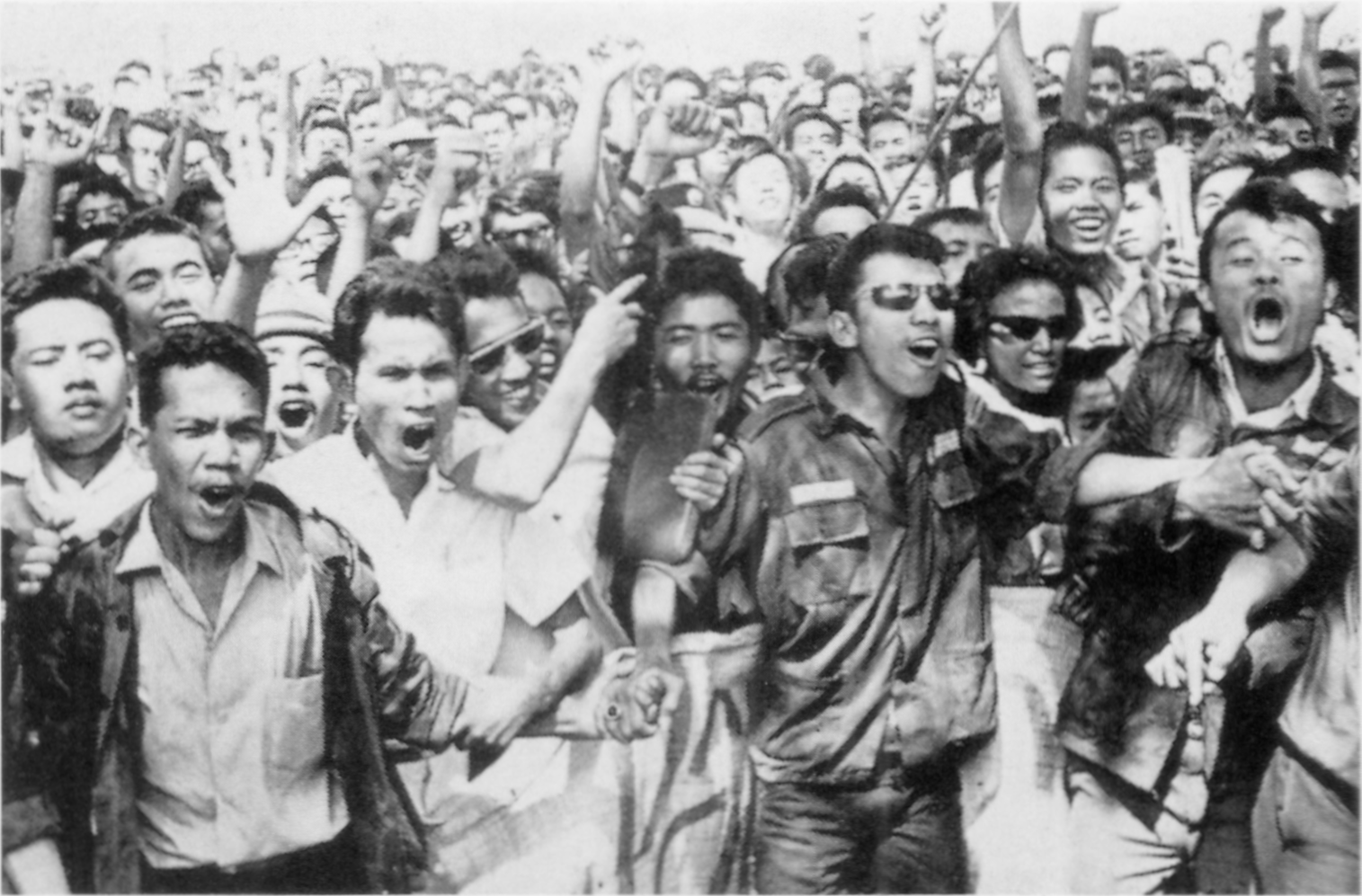
Students and soldiers demonstrated and protested against Sukarno after the 30 September Movement.

Suharto and his associates immediately blamed the PKI as masterminds of the 30 September Movement. With the support of the Army, and fueled by horrific tales of the alleged torture and mutilation of the generals at Lubang Buaya, anti-PKI demonstrations and then violence soon broke out. Violent mass action started in Aceh, then shifted to Central and East Java. Suharto then sent the RPKAD paratroops under Col. Sarwo Edhie to Central Java. When they arrived in Semarang, locals burned the PKI headquarters to the ground. The army swept through the countryside and were aided by locals in killing suspected communists. In East Java, members of Ansor Youth Movement, the youth wing of the Nahdlatul Ulama went on a killing frenzy, and the slaughter later spread to Bali. Figures given for the number of people killed across Indonesia vary from 78,000 to one million. Among the dead was Aidit, who was captured by the Army on 21 November and summarily executed shortly after. Records from the United States Department of State indicate that the U.S. embassy in Jakarta tracked the killings of these leftists, and that U.S. officials "actively supported" the efforts of the Indonesian Army to quell the labour movement. US Ambassador Marshall Green advised the Suharto government to "Spread the story of PKI‘s guilt, treachery and brutality" and assisted by providing detailed lists of thousands of PKI members to the military and anti-communist civilians.

Several hundred or thousand Indonesian leftists travelling abroad were unable to return to their homeland. Djawoto, the ambassador to China, refused to be recalled and spent the rest of his life outside of Indonesia. Some of these exiles, writers by trade, continued writing. This Indonesian exile literature was full of hatred for the new government and written simply, for general consumption, but necessarily published internationally.

=== Commemoration ===
Immediately following Suharto's appointment as President in 1967, 1 October was decreed as Pancasila Sanctity Day (Indonesian: Hari Kesaktian Pancasila). The government's official narrative is that the day is commemorated to celebrate the triumph of Pancasila over all ideologies, especially "Communism/Marxism-Leninism" (sic; official terminology). It is still commemorated to this day.

Under the New Order and to this day, the movement is usually referred to as the Thirtieth of September Movement/PKI (Indonesian: Gerakan 30 September/PKI or "G30S/PKI"). The name of Betrayal of PKI (Pengkhianatan PKI) is also used for the museum in East Jakarta to remember its history. The houses of Yani and Nasution in Central Jakarta have also become museums.

== Theories about the 30 September Movement ==
=== A PKI coup attempt: The first "official" (New Order) version ===
The Army leadership began making accusations of PKI involvement at an early stage. Later, the government of President Suharto would reinforce this impression by referring to the movement using the abbreviation "G30S/PKI". School textbooks followed the official government line that the PKI, worried about Sukarno's health and concerned about their position should he die, acted to seize power and establish a communist state. The trials of key conspirators were used as evidence to support this view, as was the publication of a cartoon supporting the 30 September Movement in the 2 October issue of the PKI newspaper Harian Rakjat. According to later pronouncements by the army, the PKI manipulated gullible left-wing officers such as Untung through a mysterious "special bureau" that reported only to the party secretary, Aidit. This case relied on a confession by the alleged head of the bureau, named Sjam, during a staged trial in 1967. But it was never convincingly proved to Western academic specialists, and has been challenged by some Indonesian accounts.

The New Order government promoted this version with a Rp800 million film directed by Arifin C. Noer entitled Pengkhianatan G30S/PKI (Treachery of G30S/PKI; 1984). Between 1984 and 1998 the film was broadcast on the state television station TVRI and, later, private stations; it was also required viewing at schools and political institutions. A 2000 survey by the Indonesian magazine Tempo found 97% of the 1,101 students surveyed had seen the film; 87% of them had seen it more than once.

=== A PKI coup attempt: Western scholars' theories ===
A number of Western scholars, while rejecting Suharto's propaganda, argue that the 30 September Movement was indeed a PKI coup d'état attempt. Robert Cribb states that "the Movement aimed to throw the army high command off balance, discredit the generals as apparent enemies of Sukarno, and shift Indonesian politics to the left so that the PKI could come to power rapidly, though probably not immediately"; Cribb believes that the PKI acted because it feared that, given Sukarno's failing health, the system of Guided Democracy would soon collapse, allowing the right-wing faction in Indonesian society to take over the country. John Roosa writes that the 30 September Movement was an attempt to purge the Indonesian government of anti-communist influences, that failed because it was "a tangled, incoherent mess".

=== Internal army affair ===
In 1971, Benedict Anderson and Ruth McVey wrote an article which came to be known as the Cornell Paper. In the essay they proposed that the 30 September Movement was not a party-political but entirely an internal army affair, as the PKI had insisted. They claimed that the action was a result of dissatisfaction on the part of junior officers, who found it extremely difficult to obtain promotions and resented the generals' corrupt and decadent lifestyles. They allege that the PKI was deliberately involved by, for example, bringing Aidit to Halim: a diversion from the embarrassing fact the Army was behind the movement.

Recently Anderson expanded on his theory that the coup attempt was almost totally an internal matter of a divided military with the PKI playing only a peripheral role; that the right-wing generals assassinated on 1 October 1965 were, in fact, the Council of Generals coup planning to assassinate Sukarno and install themselves as a military junta. Anderson argues that G30S was indeed a movement of officers loyal to Sukarno who carried out their plan believing it would preserve, not overthrow, Sukarno's rule. The boldest claim in the Anderson theory, however, is that the generals were in fact privy to the G30S assassination plot.

Central to the Anderson theory is an examination of a little-known figure in the Indonesian army, Colonel Abdul Latief. Latief had spent a career in the Army and, according to Anderson, had been both a staunch Sukarno loyalist and a friend with Suharto. Following the coup attempt, however, Latief was jailed and named a conspirator in G30S. At his military trial in the 1970s, Latief made the accusation that Suharto himself had been a co-conspirator in the G30S plot, and had betrayed the group for his own purposes.

The Indonesian military is interrogating one of the communist sympathizers involved in the September 30th movement.

Anderson points out that Suharto himself has twice admitted to meeting Latief in a hospital on 30 September 1965 (i.e. G30S) and that his two narratives of the meeting are contradictory. In an interview with American journalist Arnold Brackman, Suharto stated that Latief had been there merely "to check" on him, as his son was receiving care for a burn. In a later interview with Der Spiegel, Suharto stated that Latief had gone to the hospital in an attempt on his life, but had lost his nerve. Anderson believes that in the first account, Suharto was simply being disingenuous; in the second, that he had lied.

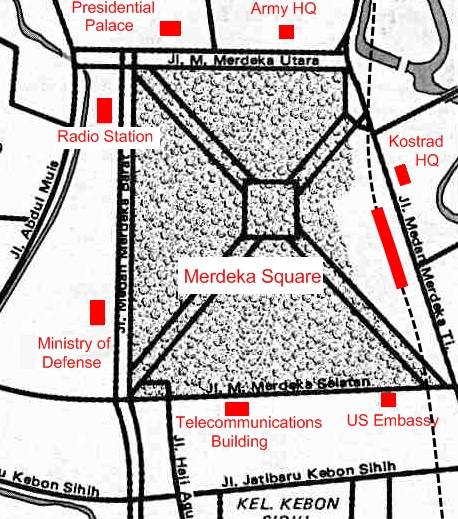
Key locations around Merdeka Square on 30 September 1965.

Further backing his claim, Anderson cites circumstantial evidence that Suharto was indeed in on the plot. Among these are:

- That almost all the key military participants named as part of G30S were, either at the time of the assassinations or just previously, close subordinates of Suharto: Lieutenant-Colonel Untung, Colonel Latief, and Brigadier-General Supardjo in Jakarta, and Colonel Suherman, Major Usman, and their associates at the Diponegoro Division's HQ in Semarang.
- That in the case of Untung and Latief, their association with Suharto was so close that they attended each other's family events and celebrated their sons' rites of passage together.
- That the two generals who had direct command of all troops in Jakarta (save for the Presidential Guard, who carried out the assassinations) were Suharto and Jakarta Military Territory Commander Umar Wirahadikusumah. Neither of these figures were assassinated, and (if Anderson's theory that Suharto lied about an attempt on his life by Latief is confirmed) no attempt was even made.
- That during the time period in which the assassination plot was organized, Suharto (as commander of Kostrad) had made a habit of acting in a duplicitous manner: while Suharto was privy to command decisions made in the context of then ongoing Konfrontasi with Malaysia, the intelligence chief of his unit Ali Murtopo had been making connections and providing information to the hostile governments of Malaysia, Singapore, United Kingdom, and the United States through an espionage operation run by Benny Moerdani in Thailand. Moerdani later became a spy chief in Suharto's government.

=== Suharto with US support ===
Professor Peter Dale Scott alleges that the entire movement was designed to allow for Suharto's response. Dale Scott draws attention to the fact the side of Lapangan Merdeka on which KOSTRAD was situated was not occupied, and that only those generals who might have prevented Suharto seizing power (except Nasution) were kidnapped. Scott also discusses the relationship between Suharto and three of the Army battalions involved in the coup, which were under his command and staffed by US-trained soldiers. He notes that these battalions switched sides during the rebellion, working to both instigate and quell the coup.

He also alleges that the fact that the generals were killed near an air force base where PKI members had been trained allowed him to shift the blame away from the Army. He links the support given by the CIA to anti-Sukarno rebels in the 1950s to their later support for Suharto and anti-communist forces. He points out that training in the US of Indonesian Army personnel continued even as overt military assistance dried up, and contends that the US contributed substantial covert aid, noting that the US military presence in Jakarta was at an all-time high in 1965, and that the US government delivered a shipment of 200 military aircraft to the Indonesian Army the summer before the coup. Scott also implicates the CIA in the destabilization of the Indonesian economy in 1965, and notes that investment by US corporations in Indonesia increased in the months prior to the movement, which he argues indicates US foreknowledge of the plot.

Another damaging revelation came to light when it emerged that one of the main plotters, Col Latief, was a close associate of Suharto, as were other key figures in the movement, and that Latief actually visited Suharto on the night before the murders.

A Tirto.id article also suggests that Suharto, with the military, was behind the attack. It mentions the military's cooperation with Washington after the latter's failure in taking over Sumatra, an area which at that time contained strong support for Marxism and therefore constituted a threat for the Western bloc, particularly the US. Over time, the military and the PKI became increasingly at-odds. In August 1965, the military feared that because of the Fifth Regiment (Angkatan Kelima), they would not able to monopolise the military - and as a result, the PKI would be unstoppable. This led to impatience within the military for the fall of Sukarno.

Latief, an officer attached to the Jakarta military command, was interviewed by Greg Poulgrain, a research fellow at Queensland University of Technology, shortly after Suharto resigned. Latief directly implicated Suharto in the coup, saying he met with Suharto six hours before the planned kidnapping of the army generals to confirm with him that the plan was about to start. In response to rumours that some generals were planning to seize power from Sukarno, Latief, Lieutenant-Colonel Untung and General Supardjo planned to kidnap the generals and take them to Sukarno for an explanation. The plan did not involve killing the generals. Kamaruzzaman Sjam, who was a long-time friend of Suharto and had contacts in the Jakarta military command as well as the PKI, was responsible for collecting the generals. At his trial, Sjam admitted to killing the generals and blamed the PKI under Aidit. Suharto used the connection between Sjam and Aidit as evidence that the PKI was responsible for killing the generals.

=== Series of inconsistencies ===
Historian John Roosa highlights several inconsistencies in the official version of the events. Roosa primarily bases his theories on the candid reflection of Supardjo. As a general who joined the movement just days before its execution, Supardjo offers a unique perspective on the movement as both an outsider and insider. In his testimony intended for the PKI leadership, he assesses the strengths and weaknesses of the 30 September Movement, particularly those of its presumed leader, Kamaruzaman Sjam.

Roosa then challenges the credibility of the evidence on which the Suharto regime based its official narrative. The evidence provided by the army consisted of the testimony of two officers who were under the influence of torture and therefore unreliable.

One has to be suspicious when the case is partly based on black propaganda and torture-induced testimonies. The confessions of two PKI leaders, Njono and Aidit, printed in the army press in late 1965, were transparent fakes. Likewise, the highly publicized story about the movement's female participants; torturing and castrating the seven captured officers in Lubang Buaya turned out to be a fabrication, presumably by psychological warfare specialists.

The first statement reported the movement's capture of the generals and their intent to act against the sympathizers of the Council of Generals. After five hours, the PKI released its second statement revealing the names of the deputy commanders under Lieutenant Colonel Untung. The third broadcast, "Decision No. 1", listed the 45 members of the Indonesian Revolution Council. The fourth broadcast then declared Untung as the highest-ranking official and any higher member was to be demoted.

Roosa argues that the broadcasts provided an inconsistent face to the public; and thus, they obtained little public support. The broadcasts were self-contradictory, as they oscillated between protecting Sukarno and disposing of him due to his unwillingness to support the movement. In the end, the broadcasts were ineffective and provided no assistance to the coup.

As to the movement itself, Roosa concludes that it was led by Sjam, in collaboration with Aidit, but not the PKI as a whole, together with Pono, Untung and Latief. Suharto was able to defeat the movement because he knew of it beforehand and because the Army had already prepared for such a contingency. He says Sjam was the link between the PKI members and the Army officers, but lack of coordination was a major reason for the failure of the movement.
