= Siswondo Parman =

Indonesian general (1918–1965)

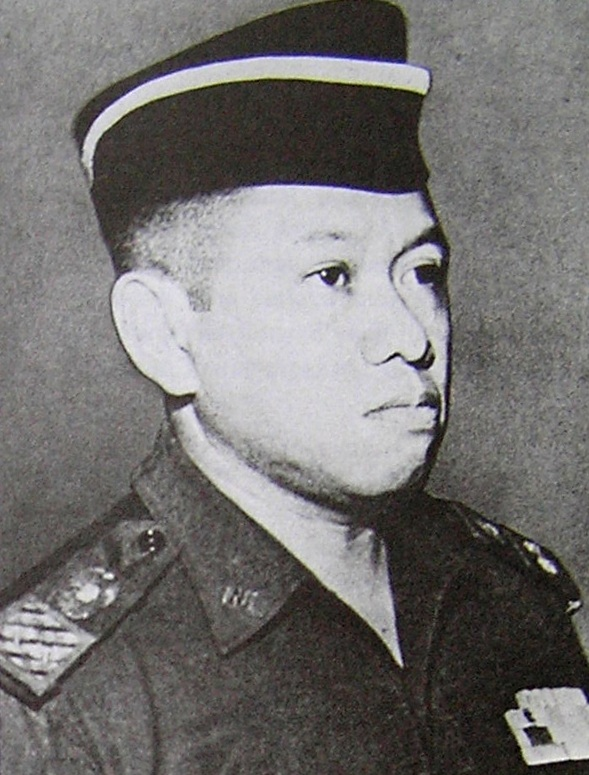
- Born: 4 August 1918; Wonosobo, Kedu Residency, Dutch East Indies
- Died: 1 October 1965 (aged 47); Lubang Buaya, East Jakarta, Indonesia
- Burial place: Kalibata Heroes' Cemetery; 6°15′26″S 106°50′46″E
- Military career
- Allegiance: Indonesia
- Service years: 1945–1965
- Rank: Major General (at death); Lieutenant General (posthumously)
- Conflicts: Indonesian National Revolution
- Awards: National Hero of Indonesia

Siswondo Parman (4 August 1918 – 1 October 1965) or more popularly known such as in streets name as S. Parman, was a soldier in the Indonesian Army. He was kidnapped from his home in Jakarta by members of the 30 September Movement in the early hours of October 1. He was later killed at Lubang Buaya.

== Early life ==
Parman was born in Wonosobo, Central Java. He graduated from the town's Dutch high school in 1940 and entered medical school, but had to leave when the Japanese invaded the Dutch East Indies. He then worked for the Japanese Kempeitai military police. He was arrested because of doubts over his loyalty, but was later freed. Following his release, he was sent to Japan for intelligence training, and worked again for the Kempeitai on his return until the end of the war, working as a translator in Yogyakarta.

== Career with the Indonesian Military ==
After the Indonesian Declaration of Independence, Parman joined the People's Security Army (TKR), the forerunner of the Indonesian National Armed Forces, and joined the military police. At the end of December 1945, he was appointed chief of staff of the Military Police in Yogyakarta. Four years later he became chief of staff to the Greater Jakarta Military Governor and was promoted to major, managing to foil a coup by the Legion of the Just Ruler (APRA), a pro-Dutch militia group led by Raymond Westerling.

In 1951, Parman was sent to the Military Police School in the United States for further training, and on November 11 that year, was appointed commander of the Jakarta Military Police. He then occupied a number of positions at National Military Police HQ and became Provost Commandant of the Military Police Corps from 1950 to 1952, and was later assigned to the Indonesian Defense Ministry before being sent to London as military attache to the Indonesian Embassy there. On 28 June, he was appointed First Assistant Chief of Staff with responsibility for intelligence to the Chief of Staff of the Army, Lieutenant General Ahmad Yani.

== Death ==
Parman was one of six army generals killed by members of the 30 September Movement on the night of 30 September 1965. He had been warned several days before of a possible Communist move. On the night of 30 September, there were no guards watching over the house.

According to Parman's wife, the couple were woken from their sleep at about 4:10 in the morning by the noise of people at the side of the house. Parman went to investigate and twenty-four men in the uniform of the Tjakrabirawa (Presidential Guard) burst into the living room. The men told him he was to appear before the President as "something interesting had happened". About 10 men went into his bedroom while Parman got dressed. His wife was more suspicious of the men, and questioned whether they had an authorising letter, to which one of the men replied he had a letter while tapping his chest pocket.

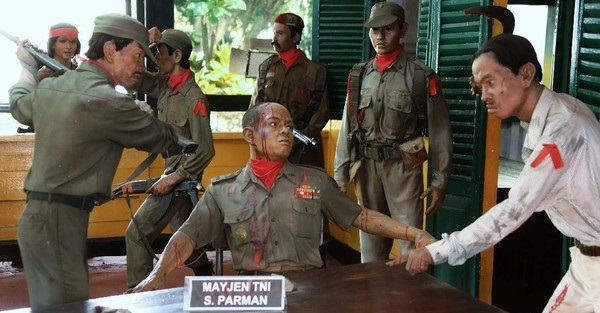
The Diorama depicted S. Parman tortured and interrogation by one of the member of 30th September Movement insurgent and member of PKI in Lubang Buaya Museum.

Parman asked his wife to report what had happened to his commander, Yani, but the telephone wires had been cut. Parman was put into a truck and taken to the movement's base at Lubang Buaya. Later that night, along with the other 2 generals and 1 first officer who had been taken alive, Parman was shot dead and his body dumped in a disused well.

According to the testimony of Soekitman, a police office who was taken alive to Lubang Buaya and was the key guide that helped the army troops locate the disused well, he saw one of the kidnapped General who was still alive and wearing full military uniform complete with its two-star insignia on his shoulder was brought right in front of him for being interrogated and refuse when forced to sign a letter, stating that he was part of the General Council that was rumored by the PKI that about to initiate military coup to topple Soekarno's presidency, by one of the member of 30 September Movement insurgent. Later on the General who refused to sign was brought and dumped to the disused well while still alive by an insurgent of the 30 September Movement. It can be implied that it was Parman that Soekitman saw, since he was the only General that was still alive and wearing his complete full military uniform when kidnapped by the members of the 30 September Movement.

The bodies of all the victims were recovered on October 4 and the men were given a state funeral on 5 October, the Armed Forces Day, before being buried at the Heroes' Cemetery, Kalibata. On the same day, via Presidential Decision No. 111/KOTI/1965, President Sukarno formally made Parman a Hero of the Revolution.

== Bibliography ==
- Bachtiar, Harsja W. (1988), Siapa Dia?: Perwira Tinggi Tentara Nasional Indonesia Angkatan Darat (Who is S/He?: Senior Officers of the Indonesian Army), Penerbit Djambatan, Jakarta, ISBN 979-428-100-X
- Hughes, John (2002) [1967]. The End of Sukarno: A Coup That Misfired: A Purge That Ran Wild (third ed.). Singapore: Archipelago Press. ISBN 981-4068-65-9.
- Mutiara Sumber Widya (publisher)(1999) Album Pahlawan Bangsa (Album of National Heroes), Jakarta
- Secretariat Negara Republik Indonesia (1994) Gerakan 30 September Pemberontakan Partai Komunis Indonesia: Latar Belakang, Aksi dan Penumpasannya (The 30 September Movement/Communist Party of Indonesia: Bankground, Actions and its Annihilation) ISBN 9798300025
- Sudarmanto, Y.B. (1996) Jejak-Jejak Pahlawan dari Sultan Agung hingga Syekh Yusuf (The Footsteps of Heroes from Sultan Agung to Syekh Yusuf), Penerbit Grasindo, Jakarta ISBN 979-553-111-5
