= List of Surakarta and Yogyakarta nobility titles =

This is a list of noble titles commonly used at the Surakarta and Yogyakarta courts, including the Mangkunegaran , Mangkualaman and Pakualaman palaces. As the symbols and centres of Javanese culture, the sovereigns of both these courts still hold high esteem in Javanese society and Indonesian society in general. The Princely Families are still known by their noble titles. Many people with distant familial relations to the Palaces also use noble titles, which sometimes are included in the official register of the names. Abdi Dalem with prominent stature are also granted titles. The sovereigns also still grant titles to certain persons deemed helpful in maintaining Javanese traditions and the dignity of the royal courts, even to non-Javanese.

As Indonesia is not a monarchy, the Government of Indonesia does not confer any noble titles on its citizens. However, noble titles are still recognised officially as distinct from personal names. This is in contrast with the situation in e.g. Germany or Austria, in which personal names were forced to be used after the abolition of the monarchies. Minister of Home Affairs Regulation no. 25 year 2011 is one example of such state regulations that recognises and govern the use of noble titles within the Indonesian administration. Even the second vice-president of Indonesia (1973-1978) — who was also the sultan of Yogyakarta — was known officially by his regnal name, Hamengkubuwono IX.

This list is created to help readers from a non-Javanese background distinguish the noble titles from the personal names of individuals commonly known only by their noble titles. Notable examples are Raden Adjeng (R.A.) Kartini, Raden Panji (R.P.) Soeroso, and M. T. (Mas Tirtodharmo) Haryono.

Note that in the Javanese alphabet the phoneme /ɔ/ is written with the same letter and sign as 'a'. In Indonesian newspapers, the sound /ɔ/ is generally written with the letter 'o', hence allowing for another mistake in pronunciation (with the phoneme /o/. The letter å in this list is used to show such differences and to prevent such mistakes. The same purpose is also intended with the use of the letter è to represent /ɛ/. Plain e is pronounced /ə/.

The common abbreviations in Indonesian modern spelling are written next to each of the titles.

== Titles for male ==
- Sampéyan Dalem Ingkang Sinuhun Kangjeng Susuhunan/Sultan - SISKS
- Kangjeng Gusti Pangéran Adipati Aryå - KGPAA
- Kangjeng Gusti Pangéran Adipati Anom - KGPAA
- Gusti Panembahan - GP
- Kangjeng Gusti Pangeran Adipati - KGPA
- Kangjeng Gusti Pangeran Haryå - KGPH
- Gusti Pangeran - GP
- Gusti Bendårå Pangeran Haryå - GBPH
- Gusti Pangeran Haryå - GPH
- Bendara Pangeran Haryå - BPH
- Kangjeng Pangeran Haryå - KPH
- Gusti Radèn Mas - GRM
- Bendårå Radèn Mas - BRM
- Radèn Mas - RM
- Radèn - R
- Kangjeng Radèn Tumenggung - KRT
- Kangjeng Radèn Haryå Tumenggung - KRHT
- Kangjeng Radèn Haryå - KRA
- Radèn Tumenggung - RT
- Radèn Riya - RRy
- Radèn Wedana - RW
- Radèn Ngabèhi - RNg
- Radèn Panèwu - RPn
- Radèn Lurah - RL
- Radèn Panji - RP
- Radèn Bekel - RB
- Mas - M

== Titles for female ==
- Gusti Kangjeng Ratu - GKR
- Kangjeng Radèn Ayu - KRAy
- Gusti Kangjeng Putri - GKP
- Gusti Kangjeng Bendara Raden Ayu Adipati - GKBRAA
- Gusti Bendårå Raden Ayu - GBRAy
- Bendårå Raden Ayu - BRAy
- Bendårå Mas Ayu - BMAy
- Mas Ayu - MAy
- Radèn Ayu - RAy
- Radèn Ajeng - RAj
- Radèn Rårå - RRr
- Rårå - Rr
