= Lubang Buaya =

Place in East Jakarta, Indonesia

- Administrative village
- Interactive map of Lubang Buaya
- Country: Indonesia
- Province: DKI Jakarta
- Administrative city: East Jakarta
- District: Cipayung

Lubang Buaya (literally "crocodile's pit") is an administrative village (kelurahan in Indonesian) in Cipayung, East Jakarta, Indonesia, located on the outskirts of Jakarta near the Halim Perdanakusuma Air Force Base. It is the site of the murder of seven Indonesian army officers during the 1 October coup attempt of the 30 September Movement.

== History ==
Lubang Buaya was first given its name by a notable Betawi ulema in Jakarta, Syarif Hidayatullah (Datuk Banjir), because there were more crocodiles when he dug a water hole. Lubang Buaya itself is actually a swamp which more crocodiles living there.

On 31 May 1965, President Sukarno called for the establishment of a "fifth force", in addition to the three existing armed forces (Army, Navy, and Air Force) and the police, to be made up of workers and peasants. This attracted strong opposition from Army commander Ahmad Yani, but soon training commenced at the swampy region near Halim called Lubang Buaya. It was under the control of Major Sujono, commander of the Halim base ground defense. Among the participants were members of the PKI-affiliated youth group Pemuda Rakyat.

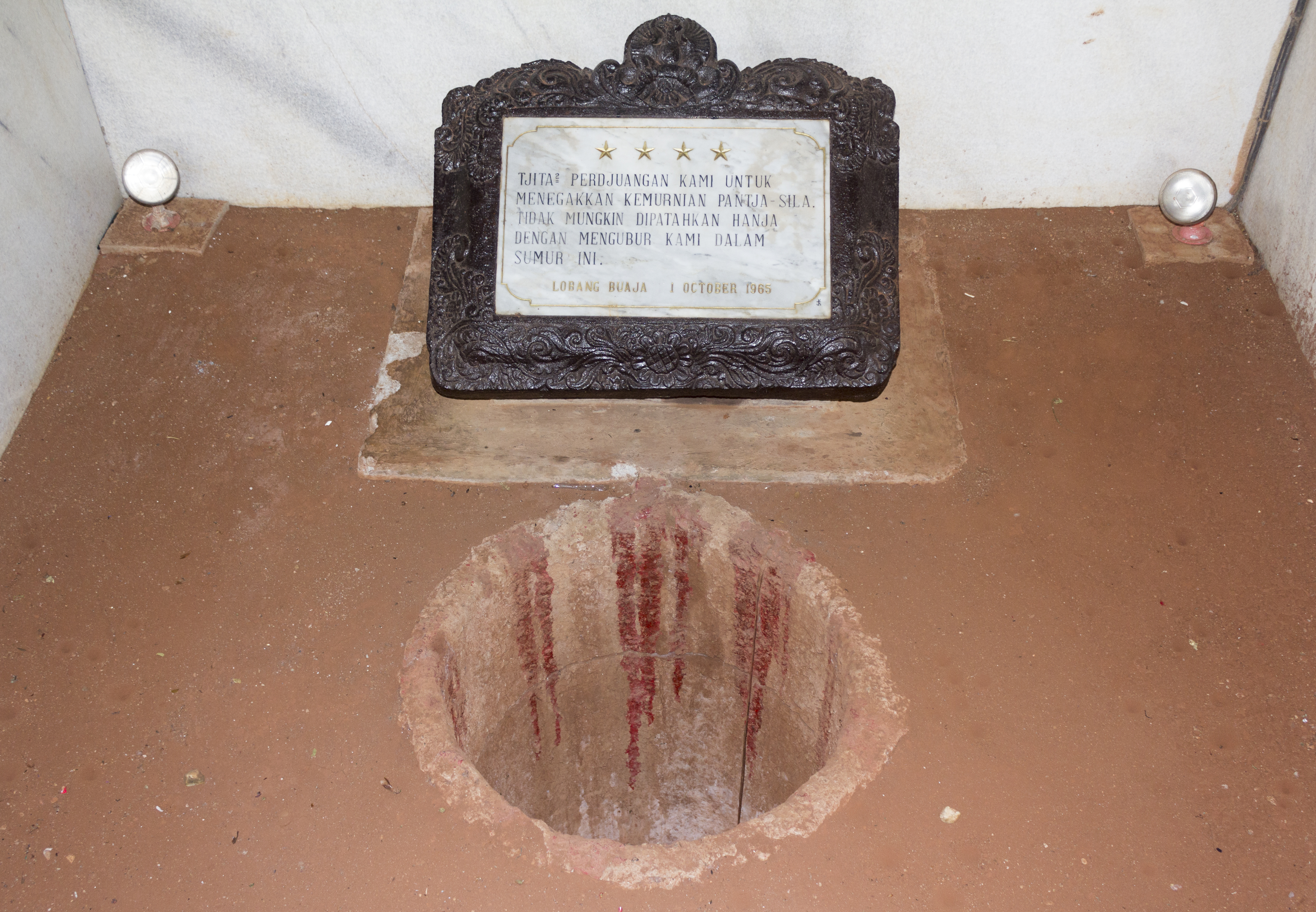
The well down which the generals' bodies were dumped, 2013

In the early hours of 1 October 1965, members of the 30 September Movement left their base at Lubang Buaya on a mission to kidnap seven generals, all members of the Army General Staff. Later that night, they returned with the bodies of three of generals killed in the kidnap attempts, as well as four living prisoners. The survivors were subsequently killed, and all seven bodies were thrown down a disused well.

On 4 October, the bodies were recovered using special equipment. Suharto personally supervised the operation.

During the New Order regime, a ceremony attended by the President and senior officials was held every year on October 1.

== Monument and museums ==
The New Order regime built a large monument, which opened in 1969, called the "Sacred Pancasila Monument". It comprises life-size bronze statues of : (from left to right)

Position	Name
Brigadier General	Sutoyo Siswomiharjo
Brigadier General	D. I. Pandjaitan
Major General	R. Suprapto
Army commander Lieutenant General	Ahmad Yani shown as pointing his finger straight to the well
Major General	M. T. Haryono
Major General	Siswondo Parman
First Lieutenant	Pierre Tendean (standing on a platform)

The Museum of PKI Treason

Behind them is a 17m high structure with a large bronze Garuda, the symbol of the Indonesian nation,. The front of the platform is covered with a bronze frieze that tells the official government version of the actions of the Indonesian Communist Party (PKI) since Indonesian independence.

Nearby there is a "Museum of PKI Treason", which was built in 1990. It contains 34 dioramas portraying acts allegedly committed by the PKI. There is also a "Sacred Pancasila Museum" opened by then President Suharto on 1 October 1981 containing another 9 dioramas of the events before and after the coup attempt, relics such as an aqualung used during the recovery of the bodies from the well, a theater and an exhibition of photographs.

The well into which the bodies were thrown is now protected by a pavilion. A small plaque reads:
"It is not possible that the aspirations of our struggle to uphold the purity of Pancasila will be defeated by merely burying us in this well.
Lubang Buaya 1 October 1965".

There are several other buildings in the vicinity, including the one in which the kidnapped generals were allegedly mistreated (containing a life-sized diorama of torture), the movement's command post, and a canteen.

Finally, there are four vehicles: Yani's official car, the jeep Suharto used at the time, a truck used by the kidnappers, and a Saracen armored car used to transport the bodies away from the scene after they had been recovered.

== Bibliography ==
- Pusat Sejarah TNI (2002) Buku Panduan Monumen Pancasila Sakti Lubang Buaya Jakarta [Guidebook to the Sacred Pancasila Monument Lubang Buaya Jakarta] (in Indonesian)
- Drakeley, S. M. (2000) Lubang Buaya: myth, misogyny and massacre Clayton, Vic.: Monash Asia Institute: Working papers on Southeast Asia / Monash University Centre of Southeast Asian Studies, 0314–6804; no. 108 ISBN 0-7326-1189-X
- Hughes, John (2002), The End of Sukarno – A Coup that Misfired: A Purge that Ran Wild, Archipelago Press, ISBN 981-4068-65-9
- Lev, Daniel S. Indonesia 1965: The Year of the Coup Asian Survey, Vol. 6, No. 2 (Feb., 1966), pp. 103–110
- Roosa, John (2007) Pretext for Mass Murder: The September 30th Movement & Suharto's Coup D'État in Indonesia, University of Wisconsin Press. ISBN 978-0-299-22034-1
- Sekretariat Negara Republik Indonesia (1975) 30 Tahun Indonesia Merdeka: Jilid 3 (1965–1973) (30 Years of Indonesian Independence: Volume 3 (1965–1973)
- Sundhaussen, Ulf (1982) The Road to Power: Indonesian Military Politics 1945–1967, Oxford University Press. ISBN 0-19-582521-7
