= Tjakrabirawa Regiment =

Indonesian President Sukarno's bodyguards (1962–1966)

- Resimen Tjakrabirawa
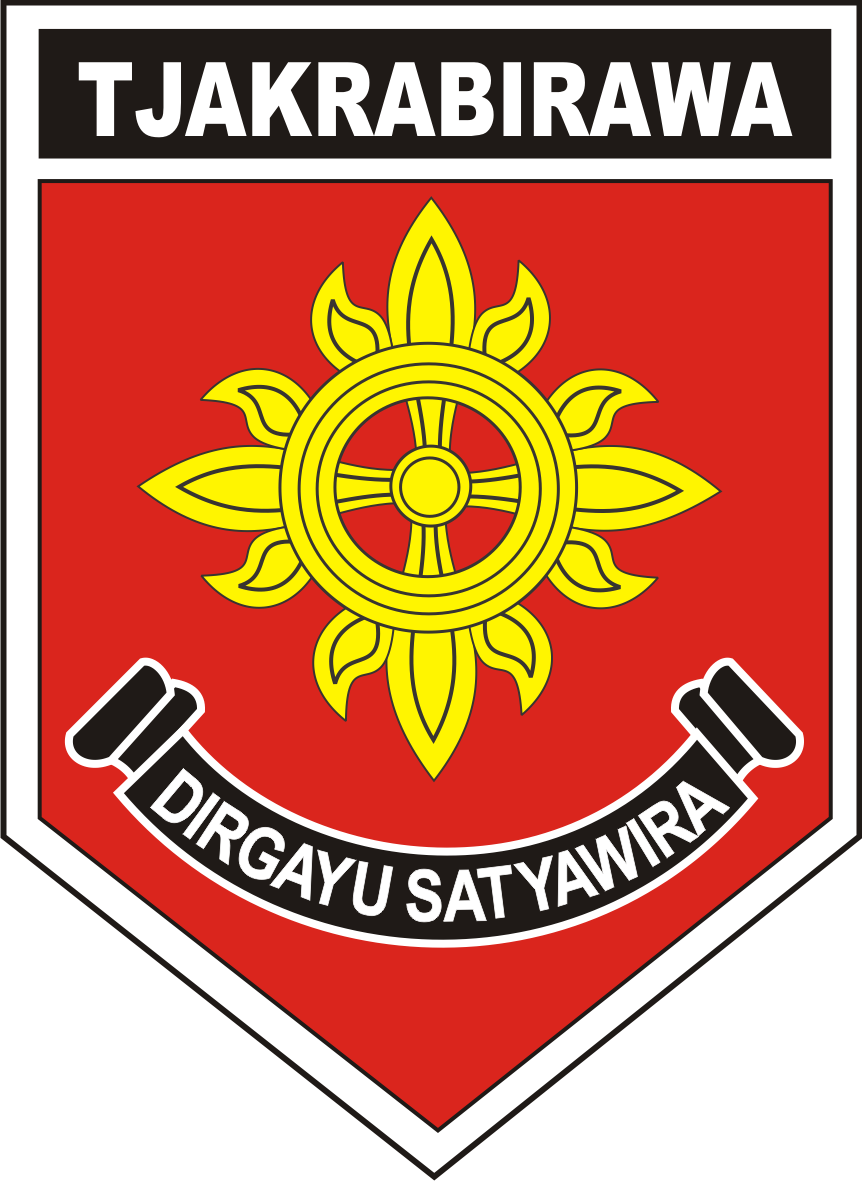
- Active: 6 June 1962–28 March 1966
- Country: Indonesia
- Branch: Army, Navy, Police, and Air Force
- Type: Protective security unit
- Role: Protection and escort for the President, and his/her family
- Size: see Organization
- Part of: Indonesian National Armed Forces (TNI)
- Garrison/HQ: Jakarta
- Motto: Dirgayu Satyawira (Long-standing Loyal Forces)
- Beret colour: Brick Red

Commanders
- Notable commanders: Brigadier General Sabur; Lieutenant Colonel Untung

The Tjakrabirawa Regiment was the presidential bodyguard unit of the former Indonesian President Sukarno. It was disbanded in 1966 because of its involvement in the coup attempt of the 30 September Movement.

== History ==
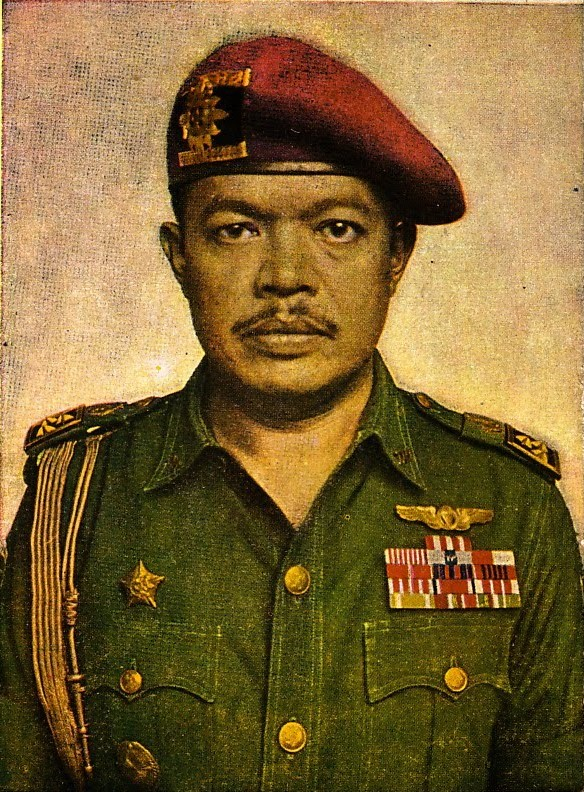
Brigadier General M. Sabur the first commander of the Tjakrabirawa

The Tjakrabirawa Regiment was formed on 6 June 1962 by President Sukarno at the suggestion of army officers after attempts to assassinate the head of state, most recently on 14 May that year. Its primary task was to provide security for the president and his family. Security for the president consisted of individual protection and area protection. Its personnel were recruited from all branches of the Indonesian military, such as the Army Raiders and the Army Parachute Commandos, the Navy Commando Operations Corps (KKO), the Air Force Rapid Action Force (PGT) and Police Mobile Brigade (BRIMOB). The first commandant and executive officer were Brigadier General M. Sabur and Colonel Maulwi Saelan. President Sukarno gave the name "Tjakrabirawa" after Krishna's sacred weapon in wayang mythology. The regiment badge was a golden "Cakra" in a dark red pentagonal field. Its members wore a brick red beret, pushed to the left.

On 30 September 1965, Lieutenant Colonel Untung, commander of one of the regiment's three battalions, led the 30 September Movement coup attempt. Tjakrabirawa personnel were involved in the kidnapping and subsequent murder of six senior generals. The coup failed, and Untung was later sentenced to death for his actions. In the months following the coup attempt, the army encouraged a series of anti-Sukarno demonstrations in Jakarta. During a large demonstration by students near the presidential palace on 24 February 1966, Tjakrabirawa soldiers opened fire, killing a female high school student and a male university student, Arif Rahman Hakim.

Two months after the issuing of the 11 March 1966 Order authorizing Maj. Gen Suharto to take all measures necessary to guarantee security, there were purges in the Air Force, Navy and Police, and the Tjakrabirawa regiment was disbanded on 28 March. Its members were hunted down by the Army, interrogated, tortured and jailed. Those deemed to have been directly involved in the 30 September Movement were executed. Presidential guard functions were subsequently taken over by the Military Police Command of the Armed Forces in early 1966, called Satgas Pomad Para. Subsequently, the Presidential Security Force ("Pasukan Pengamanan Presiden") was formed by New Order Government and is still responsible for presidential protection, as well as for honor guard duties in the capital.

== Organization ==
The Tjakrabirawa organization consisted of:

- HQ and Services Detachment
- Special Security Detachment
- Personal Security Detachment
- Honor Guard Detachment
  - Detachment HQ
  - 1st Honor Guard Battalion (consisting of Army personnel)
  - 2nd Honor Guard Battalion (consisting of Navy personnel)
  - 3rd Honor Guard Battalion (consisting of Air Force personnel)
  - 4th Honor Guard Battalion (consisting of Police personnel)
  - Presidential Band
- Support Detachment

== Bibliography ==
- Anderson, Benedict R. & McVey, Ruth T. (1971), A Preliminary Analysis of the 1 October 1965, Coup in Indonesia, Interim Reports Series, Ithaca, New York: Cornell Modern Indonesia Project, ISBN 9780877630081, OCLC 210798.
- Crouch, Harold (2007) [1978]. The Army and Politics in Indonesia. Equinox Publishing. ISBN 9789793780504.
- Dian Anditya Mutiara (17 February 2006). "Cakrabirawa Diburu TNI AD Sampai Ada yang Kabur ke Thailand" [Cakrabirawa Hunted Down by TNI AD [Indonesian Army] after Feeling as far as Thailand]. Kompas Gramedia Group#Warta_Kota (in Indonesian).
- Fotaleno, Fahmi (30 September 2017). "Ini Dia Sejarah Resimen Tjakrabirawa, Cikal Bakal Terbentuknya Paspampres". Okenews.
- Mangil Martowidjojo (2006). asaksian Tentang Bung Karno 1945–1967 [Testimony Regarding Bung Karno 1945–1967] (in Indonesian). Jakarta: Grasindo. ISBN 979-669-519-7.
- Matanasi, Petrik (2011). Untung Cakrabirawa dan G30S (in Indonesian). Trompet Book. ISBN 978-602-991-315-6.
- Paspampres (nd). "Sejarah Paspampres" [Paspampres History]. Portal PPID TNI. PPID Tentara Nasional Indonesia.
- "RESIMEN TJAKRABIRAWA".
- Roosa, John (2006). Pretext for Mass Murder: The September 30th Movement and Suharto's Coup d'État in Indonesia. Madison, Wisconsin: The University of Wisconsin Press. ISBN 978-0-299-22034-1.
