= List of Bugis people =

This is a list of prominent people of Bugis descent, sorted by field, industry and activity. Some of the notable individuals may appeared more than once based on their multiple contributions to the society, while persons of mixed ancestries have their respective heritage credited.

== Authors and writers ==
- Mario Teguh, motivational speaker and consultant
- Nh. Dini, Indonesian novelist and feminist
- Manuel Godinho de Eredia, 16th century explorer and writer, born in Portuguese Malacca (partial Portuguese ancestry)
- Raja Ali Haji, a 19th-century historian, poet and scholar (Bugis-Malay)
- Rex Shelley, a Singaporean author (of mixed English, Portuguese, Malay and Bugis origin)
- Za'aba (Zainal Abidin Ahmad), Malaysian writer and language expert

== Actors and actresses ==
- Ali Joego, stage film actor
- Andi Soraya, actress (Bugis-Arab and Cirebon ancestry)
- Andi Tenri Natassa, model, actress, TV presenter and politician (partial Dutch ancestry)
- Deddy Mizwar, Indonesian actor, film director and politician, former Vice Governor of West Java (Dutch, Betawi and Bugis ancestry)
- Deva Mahenra, actor
- Lisa Surihani, Malaysian actress, model, television host and commercial model
- Lukman Sardi, actor (Javanese and Bugis ancestry)
- Manohara Odelia Pinot, socialite, model and actress (partial American ancestry)
- Raihaanun, actress (partial Minangkabau ancestry)
- Rina Hasyim, actress
- Sophan Sophiaan, actor and politician
- Sophia Latjuba, actress (German-Jewish, Bugis and Javanese ancestry)
- Tara Basro, actress and model (partial Lampung ancestry)

== Artist and musicians ==
- Andi Fadly Arifuddin, Padi lead singer
- Andi Rianto, Indonesian film score composer
- Dewiq, Indonesian singer and songwriter (half Dutch ancestry)
- Eva Celia, actress, singer-songwriter (Dutch, German-Jewish, Bugis, Javanese, Minangkabau and Madurese ancestry)
- Hady Mirza, Singaporean singer (partial Chinese ancestry)
- Hannah Al Rashid, actress, model and activist (partial French ancestry)
- Idris Sardi, Indonesian violinist and composer
- Joe Flizzow, Malaysian rapper and co-founder of Too Phat (Buginese Malay)
- Once Mekel, former lead vocals for Dewa
- Pasha, politician and Ungu lead singer
- Sandhy Sondoro, Indonesian singer-songwriter (Palembangese, Javanese, Buginese, and Minangkabau ancestry)
- Saridjah Niung, Indonesian musician, teacher, radio announcer, playwright and batik artist
- Syafinaz Selamat, Malaysian singer and lecturer
- Taufik Batisah, Singaporean singer (partial Indian ancestry)
- Yunalis Zarai, Malaysian singer (Buginese Malay)
- Ziana Zain, Malaysian singer (partial Indian ancestry)

== Businessmen ==
- Anas Alam Faizli, Malaysian entrepreneur (quarter Bugis ancestry)
- Achmad Arnold Baramuli, Indonesian prosecutor, politician and businessman (part Manado ancestry)
- Nazir Razak, Malaysian banker (Bugis and Malay ancestry)
- Nurdin Halid, politician and businessman

== Diplomats ==
- Andi Muhammad Ghalib, Attorney General of Indonesia (1998–1999), Ambassador to India (2008–2013)
- Hamid Awaludin, former Ambassador of the Republic of Indonesia to the Russian Federation and Belarus

== Film directors ==
- Riri Riza, film director, producer and screenwriter
- Pierre Coffin, French voice actor, animator and film director (partial French ancestry)

== Head of governments ==
- Abdul Razak Hussein, 2nd Prime Minister of Malaysia
- B. J. Habibie, third President of Indonesia (Bugis, Gorontalese, Javanese ancestry)
- Ismail Abdul Rahman, former Deputy Prime Minister of Malaysia (1970-1973)
- Jusuf Kalla, former Vice President of Indonesia
- Muhyiddin Yassin, former Prime Minister of Malaysia (partial Javanese ancestry)
- Najib Razak, 6th Prime Minister of Malaysia (Bugis, Sasak and Malay ancestry)
- Abdullah Ahmad Badawi, 5th Prime Minister of Malaysia (Bugis ancestry)
- Tunku Abdul Rahman, first prime minister of Malaysia.

== Monarch ==
- Abu Bakar of Johor, the 21st sultan of the Johor Sultanate in Malaysia (Bugis-Malay)
- Alauddin Ahmad Syah, twenty-third Sultan of Aceh (1727 to 1735) and progenitor of the Bugis Dynasty of Aceh
- Alauddin Muhammad Da'ud Syah II, thirty-fifth and last Sultan of Aceh
- Andi Djemma, former King of Luwu, Indonesian nationalist
- Andi Mappanyukki, 32nd King of Bone, declared a National Hero of Indonesia in 2004
- Arung Palakka, 17th-century prince and warrior
- Hisamuddin of Selangor, second Yang di-Pertuan Agong of Malaya and the sixth Sultan of Selangor
- La Maddukelleng, supreme leader of Wajo
- Raja Haji Fisabilillah, warrior, and also the Yang Dipertuan Muda (Crown Prince) of the Johor-Riau Sultanate from 1777 to 1784 (Bugis-Malay)
- Sultan Salehuddin Shah ibni Almarhum Daeng Chelak, the 1st Sultan of Selangor in Malaysia
- Siti Aisyah We Tenriolle, the monarch of the Kingdom of Tanette, an advocate of women's rights and responsible for the translation of La Galigo epic
- Tengku Ampuan Jemaah, second Raja Permaisuri Agong of Malaysia and Tengku Ampuan of Selangor

== Journalists ==
- Meutya Hafid, Indonesian newscaster and politician
- Najwa Shihab, journalist and TV presenter (Arab-Bugis ancestry)

== Judiciary ==
- Abraham Samad, Indonesian lawyer and activist
- Farhat Abbas, Indonesian lawyer
- Muhammad Hatta Ali, thirteenth Chief Justice of the Supreme Court of Indonesia
- Harifin Tumpa, twelfth Chief Justice of the Supreme Court of Indonesia as well as the first Deputy Chief Justice of the Supreme Court Indonesia for non-judicial affairs.

== Military personnel ==
- Idham Azis, former Chief of the Indonesian National Police
- Mohammad Jusuf, Indonesian military general
- Tanribali Lamo, Indonesian military officer and bureaucrat, former Director General of National Unity and Politics in the Ministry of Home Affairs.
- Yunus Yosfiah, Indonesian politician and a decorated member of the Indonesian Army

== National heroes ==
- Andi Abdullah Bau Massepe, Indonesian freedom fighter
- Andi Djemma, former King of Luwu, Indonesian nationalist
- Andi Mappanyukki, 32nd King of Bone, declared a National Hero of Indonesia in 2004
- Pajonga Daeng Ngalie, Indonesian governor
- Ranggong Daeng Romo, Indonesian freedom fighter
- Andi Sultan Daeng Radja, Indonesian politician, independence activist

== Politicians ==
- Abdul Kahar Muzakkar, leader of an Islamic movement in South Sulawesi
- Abdul Rahman Mohamed Yassin, 1st President of the Dewan Negara Malaysia
- Alwi Shihab, Indonesian Coordinating Minister for People's Welfare in 2004–2005 and the Foreign Minister of Indonesia from 1999 to 2001 (Arab-Bugis ancestry)
- Andi Mallarangeng, former Indonesian Minister of Youth and Sports in the Second United Indonesia Cabinet (2009–2012)
- Andi Muhammad Suryady Bandy, Malaysian politician, Sabah State Assistant Minister of Youth and Sports
- Andi Oddang, former Governor of South Sulawesi
- Andi Sudirman Sulaiman, current Governor of South Sulawesi
- Amir Syamsuddin, former Minister of Justice and Human Rights of Indonesia (2011–2014)
- Anis Matta, politician
- Azalina Othman Said, Malaysian politician and lawyer (Bugis and Arab ancestry)
- Beddu Amang, economist, former head of the State Logistics Agency (Bulog) from 1995 to 1998
- Daeng Sanusi Daeng Mariok, Malaysian politician
- Dira Abu Zahar, Malaysian politician (Bugis-Malay ancestry)
- Erna Witoelar, former Minister of Human Settlements and Regional Development of Indonesia
- Ibrahim Yaacob, Malayan politician
- Isran Noor, Governor of East Kalimantan (partial Kutai ancestry)
- Indah Putri Indriani, politician, current regent of North Luwu Regency.
- Idrus Marham, former Indonesian Social Affairs Minister
- Ma'mun Sulaiman, Malaysian Politician
- Oesman Sapta Odang, Indonesian politician of the People's Conscience Party (Hanura) (partial Minang ancestry)
- Opu Daeng Risaju, Indonesian independence activist
- Rizal Mallarangeng, politician, senior advisor to Indonesia's Coordinating Economic Minister (2004-2005) and Coordinating Welfare Minister (2005-2008)
- Sandiaga Uno, politician, Minister of Tourism and Creative Economy (2020-2024), 14th Vice Governor of Jakarta (Bugis-Gorontalese and Javanese ancestry)
- Sarifuddin Sudding, politician, member of the People's Representative Council.
- Syahrul Yasin Limpo, Indonesian Minister of Agriculture
- Zainal Arifin Paliwang, Governor of North Kalimantan.

== Religious leaders ==
- Ali Yafie, faqih and chairman of the Indonesian Ulema Council
- Muhammad Quraish Shihab, religious scholar (Arab-Bugis ancestry)
- Nasaruddin Umar, Grand Imam of Istiqlal Mosque

== Sports ==
- Ahmad Amiruddin, footballer
- Andi Oddang, former footballer
- Hamka Hamzah, professional footballer
- Isnan Ali, retired footballer
- La Nyalla Mattalitti, former chairman of the Football Association of Indonesia
- Ramang, former footballer
- Syamsidar, former footballer
- Zulkifli Syukur, professional footballer
- Kusuma Wardhani, former archer
- Achmad Hisyam, former footballer
- Sunar Sulaiman, footballer
- Rachmat Latief, footballer
- Maulwi Saelan, Indonesian footballer
- Rahmat, footballer
- Hendra Ridwan, professional footballer

== See also ==
- List of Acehnese people
- List of Batak people
- List of Chinese Indonesians
- List of Javanese people
- List of Minangkabau people
- List of Moluccan people
- List of Sundanese people
