= Pierre Tendean =

National Hero of Indonesia (1939–1965)

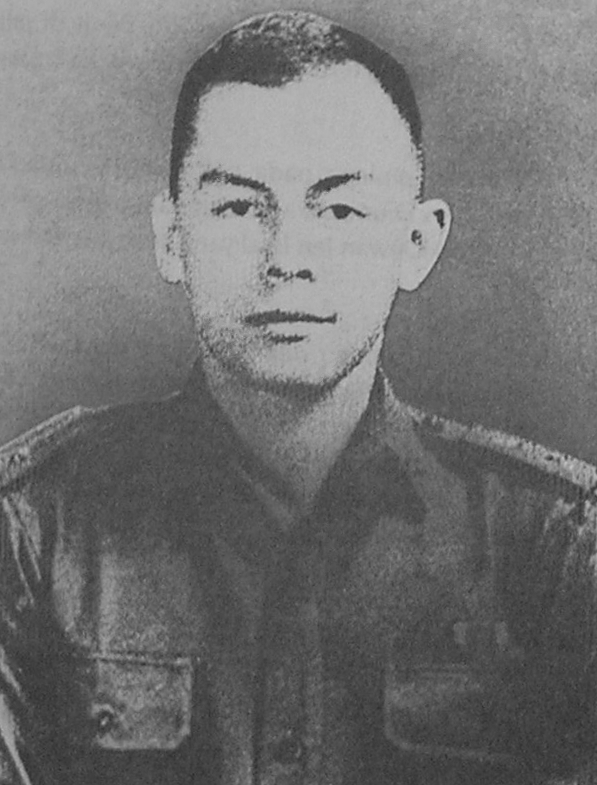
- Tendean, c. 1963
- Born: 21 February 1939; Batavia, Dutch East Indies
- Died: 1 October 1965 (aged 26); Jakarta, Indonesia
- Cause of death: Tortured and killed in Lubang Buaya, Jakarta, Indonesia
- Burial place: Kalibata Heroes' Cemetery
- Military career
- Allegiance: Indonesia
- Branch: Indonesian Army
- Service years: 1962–1965
- Conflicts: PRRI Rebellion; Operation Sapta Marga; Operation Dwikora
- Awards: National Hero of Indonesia

Pierre Andries Tendean (21 February 1939 – 1 October 1965) was an Indonesian Army lieutenant. He is best known for being one of the victims of the 30th September Movement (G30S) and was posthumously awarded as revolution hero, later Indonesian national hero.

== Early life ==
Pierre Andries Tendean was born in a public hospital Centrale Burgerlijke Ziekeninrichting (CBZ, now Cipto Mangunkusumo Hospital) in Batavia on 21 February 1939 to Aurelius Lammert Tendean, a psychiatrist from Minahasa, and Dutch-born French mother Maria Elizabeth Cornet.

One year after Pierre Tendean was born, his family relocated to Tasikmalaya following his father’s assignment to address a malaria outbreak. During his early childhood, Tendean suffered from an illness that required treatment at Cisarua Hospital in Bogor, prompting his father to request a transfer there. In 1942, shortly before the Japanese occupation of the Dutch East Indies, the family moved again, this time to Magelang, where his father was appointed vice director of the Keramat Mental Hospital.

In 1946, Tendean enrolled at Sekolah Rakyat Botton (Botton People School) in Magelang. In the aftermath of the Madiun Affair, the Tendean family residence was looted and his father was abducted. Although he managed to escape, he sustained a gunshot wound and was treated at the Central General Hospital (CBZ) in Semarang (now known as Kariadi Hospital). In 1950, while Tendean was in the fifth grade, the family relocated permanently to Semarang following his father’s appointment as head of the Central Psychiatric Hospital of Semarang. Tendean continued his study to State Junior High School 1 Semarang in 1952, then in 1955 he enrolled at State High School B Section Semarang (now known as SMA Negeri 1 Semarang. He graduated from the latter school on 5 August 1958.

His desire after completing high school was to attend the National Military Academy (Indonesian: Akademi Militer Nasional). However, his parents wanted him to become a doctor like his father or an engineer. The compromise was for Pierre to enroll at Army's Engineering Academy (Indonesian: Akademi Zeni Angkatan Darat (Akziad)) in Bandung. He was accepted as cadet on 26 November 1958. Tendean completed basic training on 23 January 1959. On 1 April, Tendean was promoted to cadet corporal.

== Military career ==
In his second year in the academy, Tendean received battlefield experience while in the academy when he was sent to West Sumatra with his fellow cadets to participate in Operation 17 August led by Colonel Ahmad Yani against the Revolutionary Government of the Republic of Indonesia (PRRI) in the region. At that time Tendean was a Corporal Cadet and was assigned to the Army's Corps of Engineers (Indonesian: Zeni Tempur).

The engineering battalion were attached to 3rd Combat Team Regiment Diponegoro. They were dispatched from Tanjung Priuk Port on 6 October 6, 1959 and arrived at Teluk Bayur Port on 8 October. Their first assignment was to restore damaged railways which was done in about 20 days. The deployment was concluded on 31 December 1959. On 1 October 1960, Tendean and his fellow cadets were promoted to cadet sergeant.

On 19 December 1961, on the same day as the announcement of Trikora by Sukarno, Tendean and his fellow cadets graduated from Atekad, formerly Akziad, and was commissioned as second lieutenant in graduation ceremony (Indonesian: Letnan Dua (Letda) Czi) in north alun-alun of Yogyakarta Palace. On the next day, they were sworn in as army officers by Sukarno in a ceremony which was presided by Gatot Subroto in Magelang. Cadets from engineering school still needed to continue engineering application training course for a year in 1962. After completing the course, on 13 December 1962 Tendean and five other graduates was assigned to 1st Combat Engineering Battalion of 2nd Military Regional Command Bukit Barisan. They departed to Medan in January 1963. He was assigned Platoon Leader 1, Combat Engineer Company A.

Around late June or early July 1963, Tendean and several fellow officers were reassigned to attend the Intelligence Training Center (Pusdikintel) in Bogor. Tendean underwent three months of intelligence training before being seconded to the Army Central Intelligence Executive Agency (Dinas Pelaksana Intelijen Angkatan Darat) during the Dwikora campaign.

He was subsequently assigned for approximately one year to operations in Riau and the Riau Islands, during which he carried out several intelligence missions, including multiple covert crossings into Malaya. In the same period, he was also tasked with assisting State Minister Oei Tjoe Tat, who traveled discreetly in Malaya to mobilize opposition to the formation of the Federation of Malaysia.

As a fresh Zeni officer, he then pursued a year-long course in military-civil engineering in the same academy and finished the course in December 1962. His first assignment after Academy was as Platoon Commander in the 2nd Battalion of the Corps of Engineers in the 2nd Regional Military Command (Indonesian: Komandan Peleton Batalyon Zeni Tempur 2 Komando Daerah Militer II (Danton Yon Zipur 2 / Dam II) ) in Medan.

The following year, Tendean received intelligence training in Army Intelligence Training Centre in Bogor and was subsequently assigned to the Army Central Intelligence Service (Indonesian: Dinas Pusat Intelijen Angkatan Darat (DIPIAD)). He was sent to the front lines during operation Dwikora, Indonesia's confrontation with Malaysia, where he led a group of volunteers in several infiltrations into Malaysia performing intelligence gathering.

On 15 April 1965, Tendean was promoted to First Lieutenant (Indonesian: Letnan Satu (Lettu) Czi) and simultaneously was assigned as a aide-de-camp to Coordinating Minister for Defense and Security/Chief of Staff of the Armed Forces General Abdul Haris Nasution.

In the final days before the events of 30 September 1965, Tendean accompanied General A. H. Nasution on a series of official engagements. On 24 September, he accompanied Nasution to Padjadjaran University in Bandung for the presentation of unit standards (tunggul) to a student regiment battalion. The following day, they traveled to Yogyakarta to visit the Air Force Academy. During this visit, Nasution declined an invitation from the Diponegoro Military Commander to inspect 403th Infantry Battalion in Kentungan. Notably, elements of this battalion were later implicated in the Yogyakarta-related actions of the 30 September Movement, which resulted in the deaths of Colonel Katamso and Lieutenant Colonel Sugiyono. On 28 September, Tendean again accompanied Nasution to an official event held at the Bank Indonesia building.

== 30th September Movement ==
On 30 September 1965 at approximately 15:00, Tendean was officially recorded as being on leave, as he planned to travel to Semarang the following morning to attend his mother’s birthday. That afternoon, despite his leave status, he assisted Victor Sihite, a journalist from Sinar Harapan, who sought to photograph General A. H. Nasution for an article marking the anniversary of the Armed Forces of the Republic of Indonesia (ABRI), recommending the journalist to visit the following day. Later the same afternoon, Tendean met with his brother-in-law, Jusuf Razak, to discuss his planned return to Semarang the next day.

In the early hours of 1 October 1965, a force of approximately 100 personnel drawn from Tjakrabirawa and several other units arrived at General A. H. Nasution's residence. According to Nasution's later testimony, the group initially managed to locate him, but a commotion ensued, enabling him to escape by jumping out of an outer gate. His eldest child, awakened by the disturbance, reported the incident to Pierre Tendean, who then armed himself with a Garand rifle and went out to confront the intruders. After a brief exchange, Tendean was taken away by the troops, reportedly because he was mistaken for Nasution, as recalled by Hamdan Mansjur, one of Nasution's aides present at the residence.

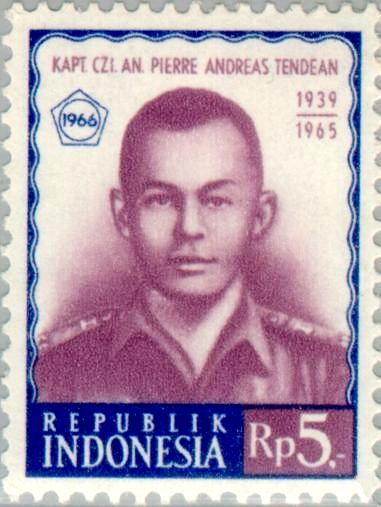
Pierre Tendean on a 1966 Indonesia stamp with his name being misspelled as Andreas instead of Andries.

Tendean was brought to Lubang Buaya along with six high-ranking officers of the army. He was shot to death, and his body thrown into an old well with those of the other captives. His body was among those recovered from the well just three days later.

On 5 October 1965, President Sukarno named Pierre Tendean a national hero for his dedication and sacrifice to the nation. He was posthumously promoted to the rank of Captain and buried in the Kalibata Heroes' Cemetery. The second youngest of the 8 who were killed in Jakarta, he was only 26 years old at the time of his murder.

== Personal life ==
Tendean had an older sister, Mitzi Farre, and younger sister, Rooswidiati.

== Bibliography ==
- Besman, Abie, ed. (2019). Sang Patriot: Kisah Seorang Pahlawan Revolusi – Biografi Resmi Pierre Andries Tendean [The Patriot: The Story of a Revolutionary Hero – Official Biography of Pierre Andries Tendean] (in Indonesian). Jakarta: Penerbit Buku Kompas. ISBN 978-602-412-652-0.
- Masykuri (1983). Pierre Tendean (in Indonesian). Jakarta: Proyek Inventarisasi dan Dokumentasi Sejarah Nasional, Direktorat Sejarah dan Nilai Tradisional, Departemen Pendidikan dan Kebudayaan.
- "Kapten Czi Anumerta Pierre Andries Tendean" [Captain (Posthumously Promoted) Pierre Andries Tendean] (in Indonesian). Indonesian Army Headquarters. Archived from the original on 27 June 2007.
