= National Hero of Indonesia =

Award

National Hero of Indonesia (Indonesian: Pahlawan Nasional Indonesia) is the highest-level title awarded in Indonesia. It is posthumously given by the Government of Indonesia for actions which are deemed to be heroic, defined as "actual deeds which can be remembered and exemplified for all time by other citizens" (Note: Original: "'... perbuatan nyata yang dapat dikenang dan diteladani sepanjang masa bagi warga masyarakat lainnya.") or "extraordinary service furthering the interests of the state and people". (Note: Original: "... berjasa sangat luar biasa bagi kepentingan bangsa dan negara.") The Ministry of Social Affairs gives seven criteria which an individual must fulfill, as follows:

1. Have been an Indonesian citizen (Note: Act No. 20 of 2009 gives provisions for persons who died before Indonesia's independence in 1945, allowing those who "fought against colonialism in an area that is now part of the Unitary State of the Republic of Indonesia" (Original: "berjuang melawan penjajahan di wilayah yang sekarang menjadi wilayah Negara Kesatuan Republik Indonesia") to receive the title.) who is deceased and, during their lifetime, led an armed struggle or produced a concept or product useful to the state;
2. Have continued the struggle throughout their life and performed above and beyond the call of duty;
3. Have had a wide-reaching impact through their actions;
4. Have shown a high degree of nationalism;
5. Have been of good moral standing and respectable character;
6. Never surrendered to their enemies; and
7. Never committed an act which taints their legacy. (Note: Based on the original: 1. Warga Negara Indonesia yang telah meninggal dunia dan semasa hidupnya: 1. Telah memimpin dan melakukan perjuangan bersenjata atau perjuangan politik/ perjuangan dalam bidang lain mencapai/ merebut /memper tahankan/mengisi kemerdekaan serta mewujudkan persatuan dan kesatuan bangsa.; 2. Telah melahirkan gagasan atau pemikiran besar yang dapat menunjang pembangunan bangsa dan negara.; 3. Telah menghasilkan karya besar yang mendatangkan manfaat bagi kesejahteraan masyarakat luas atau meningkatkan harkat dan martabat bangsa Indonesia.; 2. Pengabdian dan Perjuangan yang dilakukannya berlangsung hampir sepanjang hidupnya (tidak sesaat) dan melebihi tugas yang diembannya.; 3. Perjuangan yang dilakukan mempunyai jangkauan luas dan berdampak nasional.; 4. Memiliki konsistensi jiwa dan semangat kebangsaan/nasionalisme yang tinggi.; 5. Memiliki akhlak dan moral yang tinggi.; 6. Tidak menyerah pada lawan/musuh dalam perjuangannya.; 7. Datam riwayat hidupnya tidak pernah melakukan perbuatan tercela yang dapat merusak nilai perjuangannya.)

Nominations undergo a four-step process and must be approved at each level. A proposal is made by the general populace in a city or regency to the mayor or regent, who must then make a request to the province's governor. The governor then makes a recommendation to the Ministry of Social Affairs, which forwards it to the president, represented by the Board of Titles (Dewan Gelar); this board consists of two academics, two persons of a military background, and three persons who have previously received an award or title. Those selected by the president, as represented by the Board, are awarded the title at a ceremony in the Indonesian capital of Jakarta. Since 2000, the ceremony has occurred in early November, coinciding with Indonesia's Heroes' Day (Hari Pahlawan).

The legal framework for the title, initially styled National Independence Hero (Pahlawan Kemerdekaan Nasional), was established with the release of Presidential Decree No. 241 of 1958. The title was first awarded on 30 August 1959 to the politician turned writer Abdul Muis, who had died the previous month. This title was used for the rest of Sukarno's rule. When Suharto rose to power in the mid-1960s, the title was given its current name. Special titles at the level of National Hero have also been awarded. Hero of the Revolution (Pahlawan Revolusi) was given in 1965 to ten victims of the 30 September Movement that resulted in end of Sukarno reign, while Sukarno and former vice-president Mohammad Hatta were given the title Proclamator Heroes (Pahlawan Proklamator) in 1986 for their role in reading the Proclamation of Indonesian Independence.

A total of 198 men and 18 women have been deemed national heroes. These heroes have come from all parts of the Indonesian archipelago, from Aceh in the west to Papua in the east. They represent numerous ethnicities, including native Indonesians, ethnic Chinese, Arabs and Eurasians. They include prime ministers, guerrillas, government ministers, soldiers, royalty, journalists, and a bishop.

The following list is initially presented in alphabetical order; owing to differing cultural naming conventions, not all entries are sorted by last name. The list is further sortable by year of birth, death, and recognition. Names are standardised using the Indonesian Spelling System and thus may not reflect the original spelling. (Note: The Indonesian language has undergone several spelling reforms since the country declared its independence in 1945. As of 2020, the Indonesian Spelling System, issued in 2015, is the official spelling system in Indonesia.)

== National Heroes of Indonesia ==
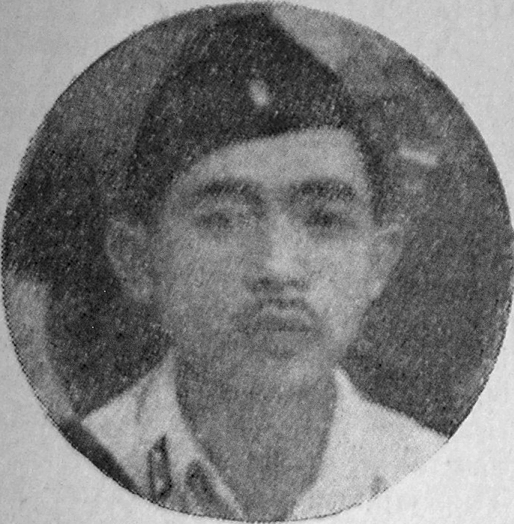
I Gusti Ngurah Rai

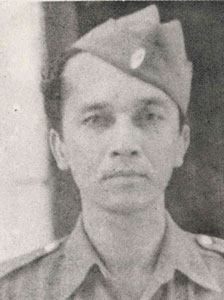
Adnan Kapau Gani

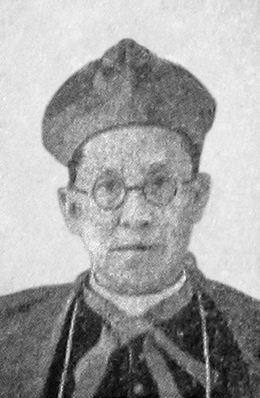
Albertus Sugiyapranata

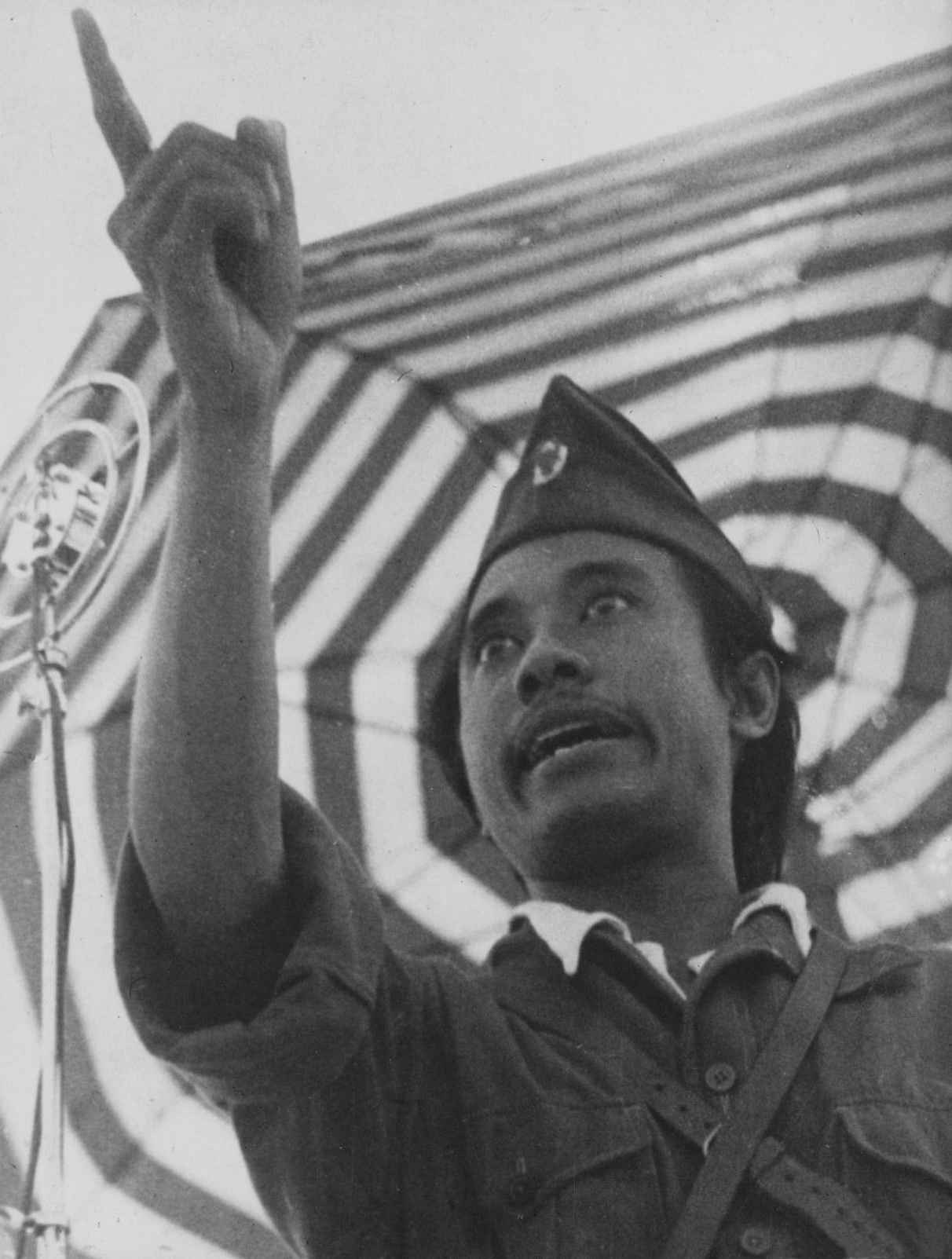
Bung Tomo

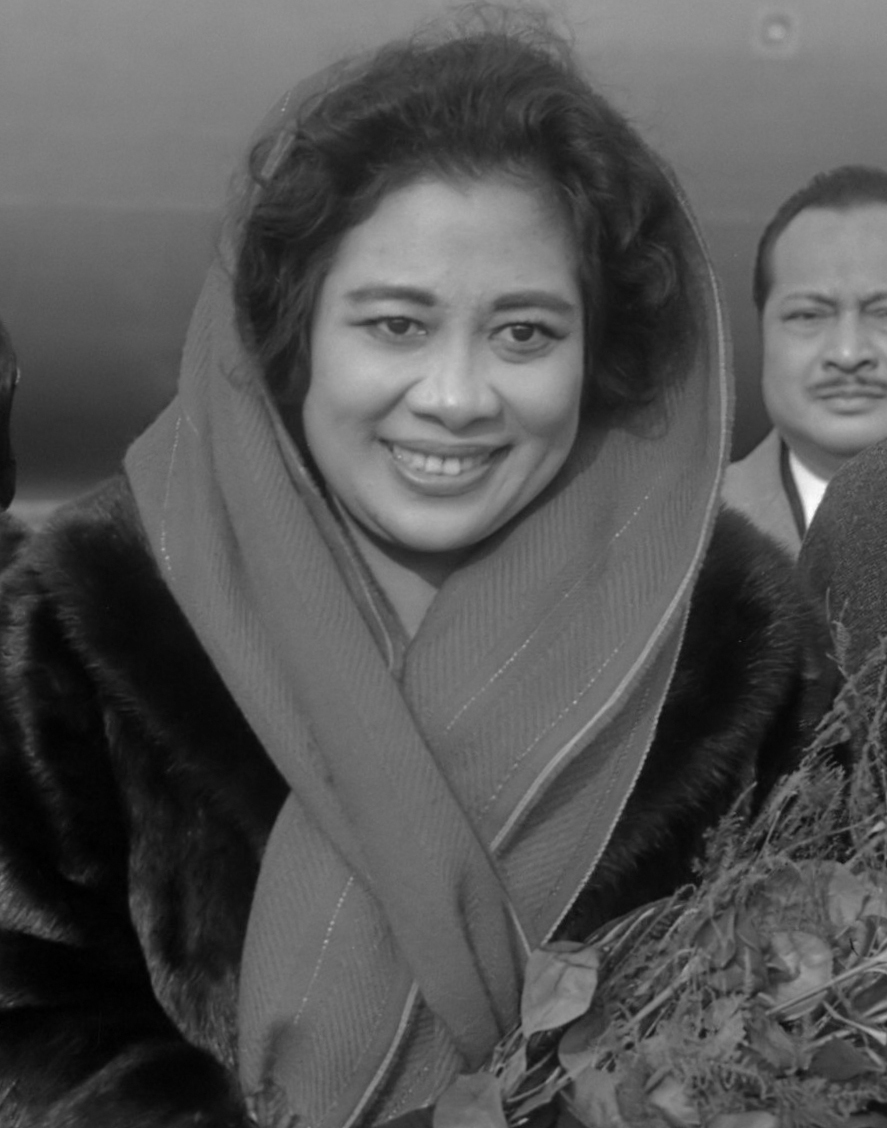
Fatmawati

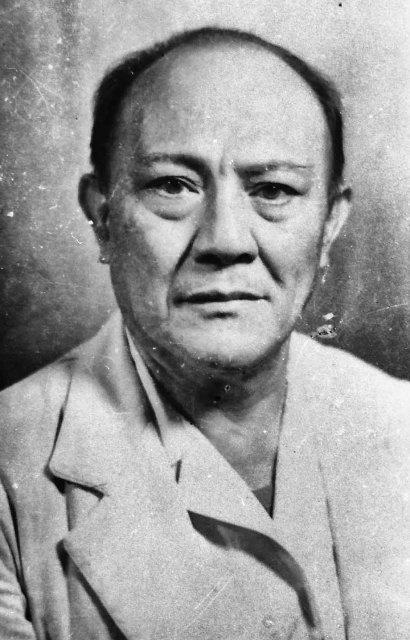
Sam Ratulangi

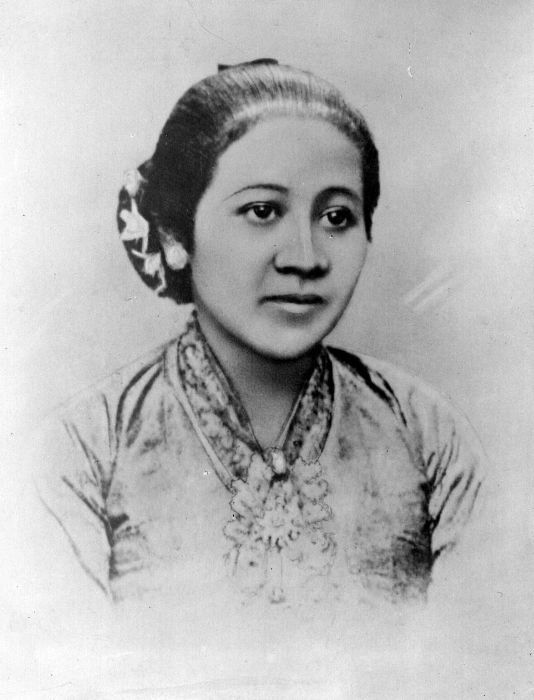
Kartini

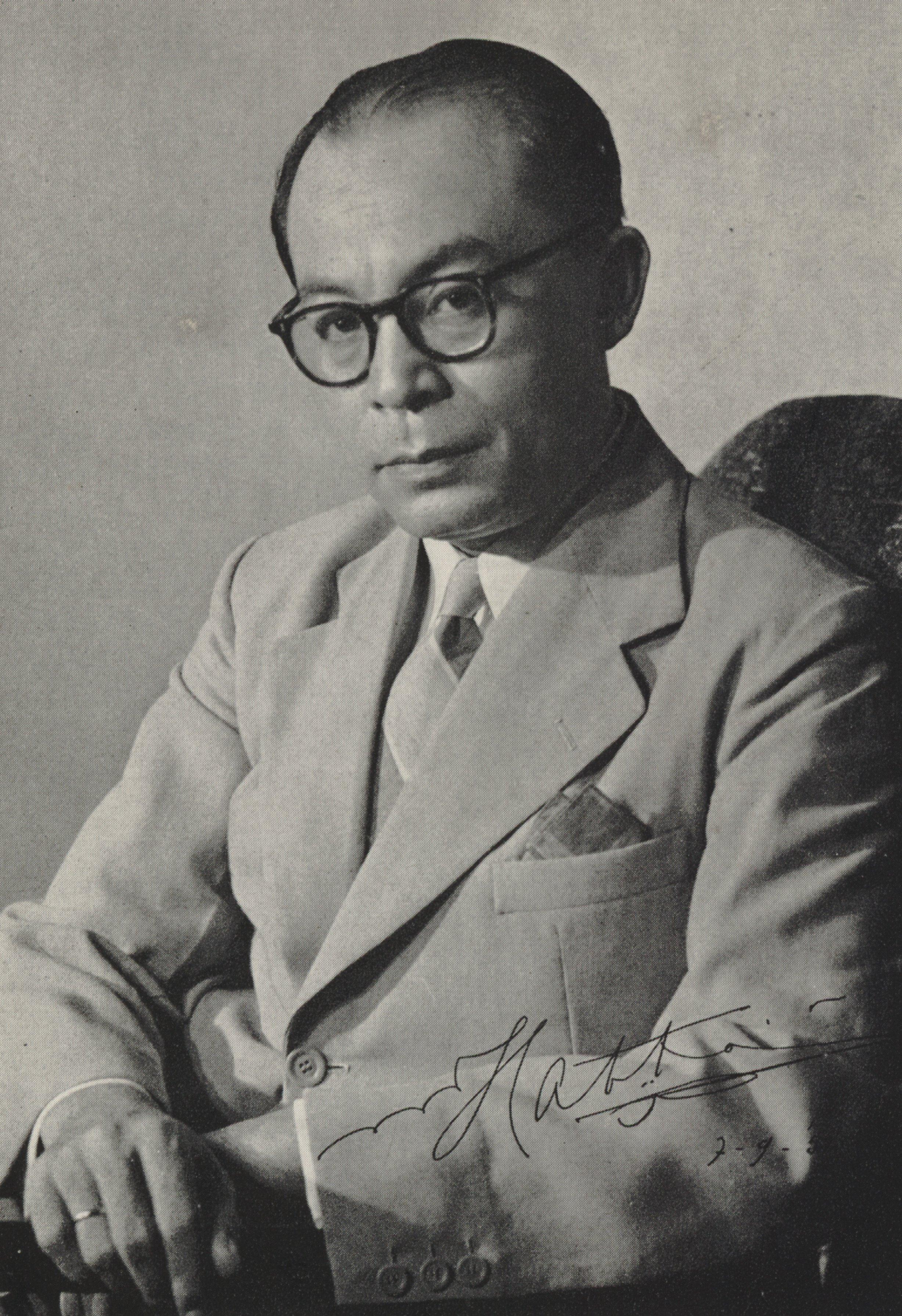
Mohammad Hatta

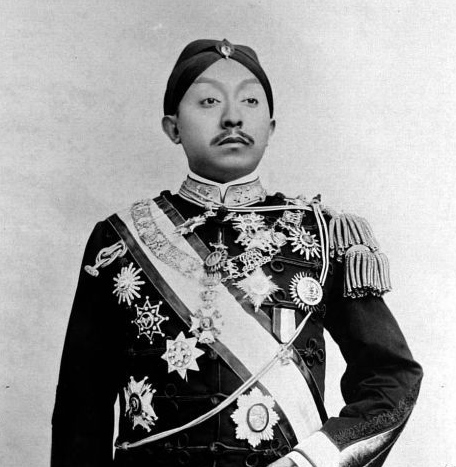
Pakubuwono X

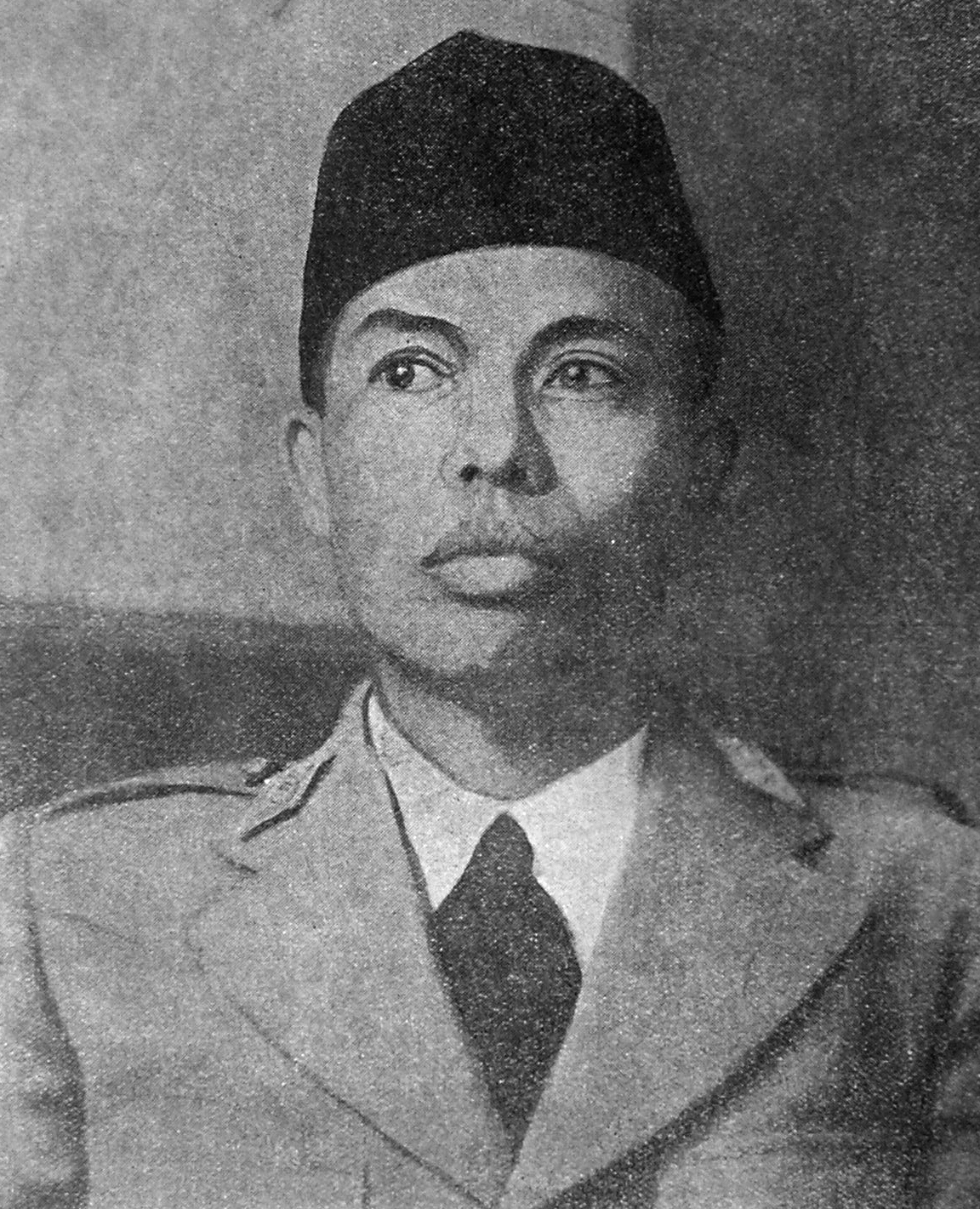
Sudirman

Sukarno

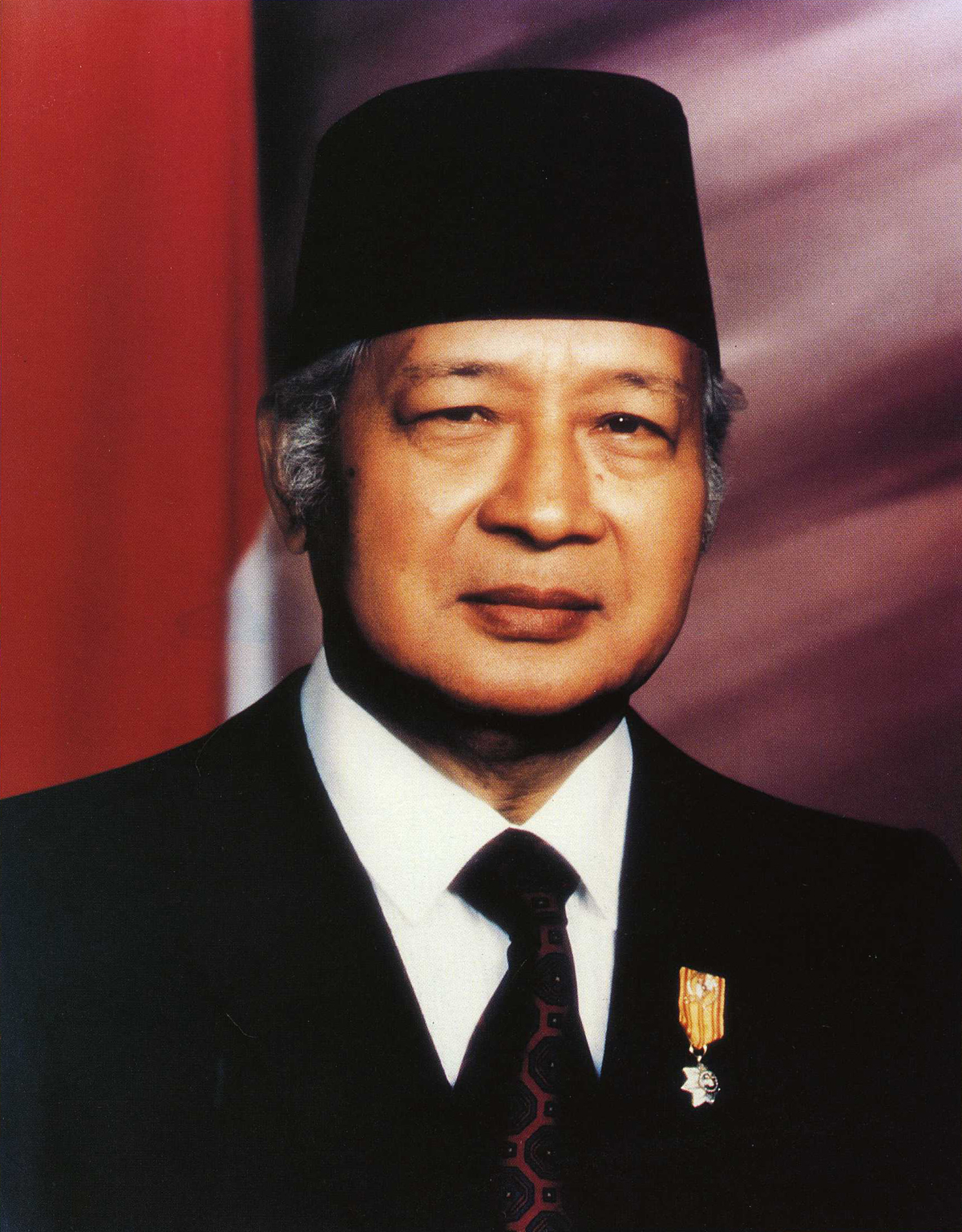
Suharto

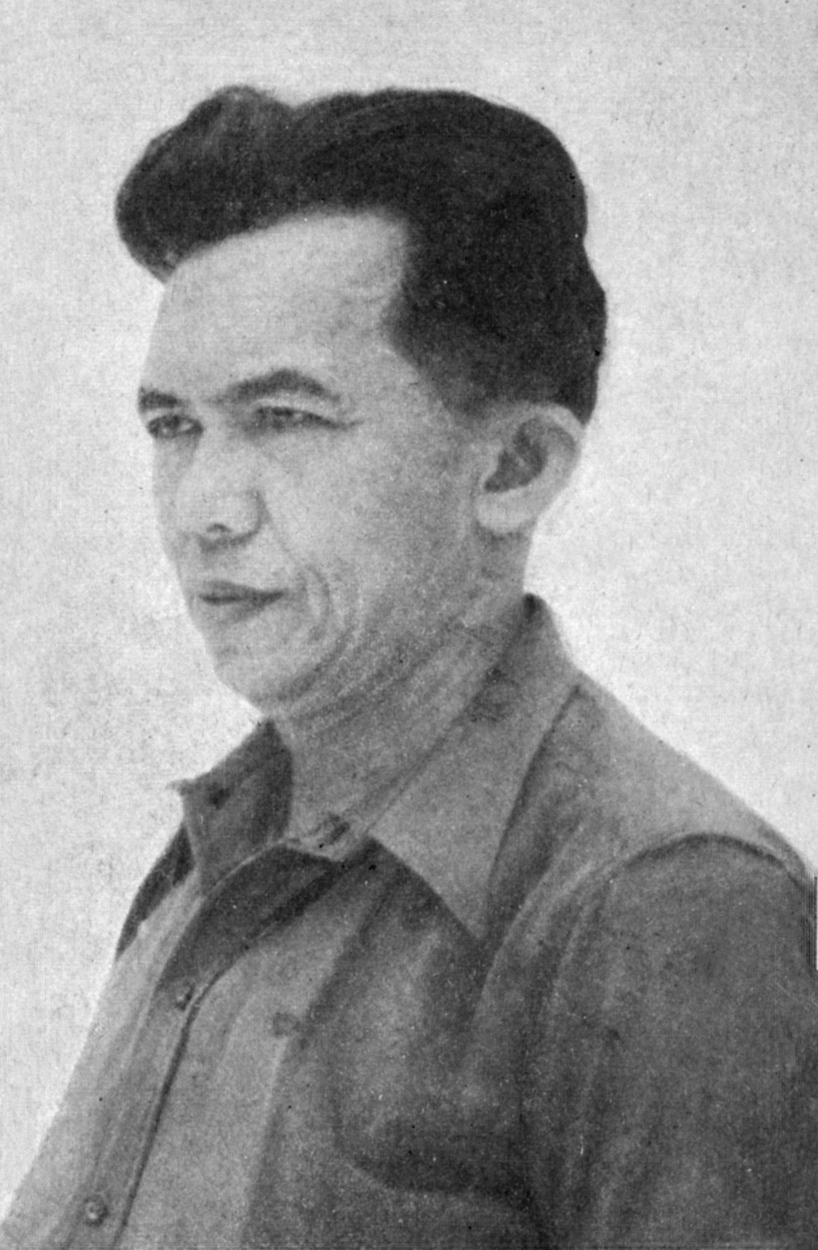
Tan Malaka

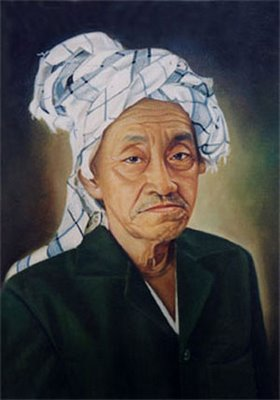
As'ad Syamsul Arifin

National Heroes of Indonesia
Name	Born	Died	Elevated	Notes	Ref.
Abbas Abdul Jamil	1922	2007	2026	Islamic cleric, militia leader	
Abdul Chalim	1898	1972	2023	Islamic Leader, co-founder of Nahdlatul Ulama	
Abdul Halim Majalengka	1887	1962	2008	Independence activist and Islamic scholar, Member of BPUPK	
Abdul Haris Nasution	1918	2000	2002	General in the Army, twice appointed Army Chief of Staff	
Abdul Kadir	1771	1875	1999	Nobleman from Melawi, promoted economic development, fought against the colonial Dutch	
Abdul Kahar Muzakir	1907	1963	2019	Member of BPUPK and first rector of the Islamic University of Indonesia	
Abdul Malik Karim Amrullah	1908	1981	2011	Islamic scholar and author	
Abdul Muis	1883	1959	1959	Politician, later author	(Note: Some sources give his birth year as 1886 or 1890.)
Abdul Muthalib Sangadji	1889	1949	2026	Politician, militia leader	
Abdul Rahman Saleh	1909	1947	1974	Early figure in the Air Force, killed when his medical flight was shot down by the Dutch	
Abdul Wahab Hasbullah	1888	1971	2014	Founding father of Nahdlatul Ulama, established pro-independence organizations	
Abdurrahman Baswedan	1908	1986	2018	Journalist who united Arab-descent people with Indonesians during the period of the National Revolution	
Abdurrahman Wahid	1940	2009	2025	Fourth president of Indonesia, Islamic leader, political activist, and strong advocate for human rights, tolerance, and pluralism	
Ahmad Sanusi	1889	1950	2022	Islamic scholar, Member of BPUPK	
Ahmad Subarjo	1896	1978	2009	Independence activist and government minister	
Adam Malik Batubara	1917	1984	1998	Journalist and independence activist, 3rd vice president of Indonesia	
Adnan Kapau Gani	1905	1968	2007	Independence activist, smuggled weapons to support the National Revolution	
Nyi Ageng Serang	1752	1828	1974	Javanese guerrilla leader who led attacks on Dutch colonials on several occasions	
Agus Salim	1884	1954	1961	Minang Islamic leader, politician, independence activist	
Agustinus Adisucipto	1916	1947	1974	Early figure in the Air Force, killed when his medical flight was shot down by the Dutch	
Ahmad Dahlan	1868	1934	1961	Javanese Islamic leader, established Muhammadiyah; husband of Siti Walidah	
Ahmad Hanafiah	1905	1947	2023	Islamic leader, founder of Hizbullah (Indonesia)	
Ahmad Rifa'i	1786	1870	2004	Islamic thinker and writer known for his anti-Dutch stance	
Ahmad Yani	1922	1965	1965	Leader of the Army, killed by the 30 September Movement	
Aji Muhammad Idris	1667	1739	2021	Monarch of the Sultanate of Kutai (now part of East Kalimantan) who fought the Dutch	
Albertus Sugiyapranata	1896	1963	1963	Javanese Catholic bishop and nationalist	
Alexander Andries Maramis	1897	1977	2019	Member of BPUPK and government minister	
Ali Sadikin	1926	2008	2026	Politician, former governor of Jakarta	
Ali Sastroamidjojo	1903	1975	2026	Diplomat, former prime minister of Indonesia	
Alimin	1889	1964	1964	Independence advocate, politician, and Communist Party of Indonesia figure	
Andi Abdullah Bau Massepe	1918	1947	2005	Bugis nobleman, attacked Dutch forces during National Revolution, son of Andi Mappanyukki	
Andi Jemma	1901	1965	2002	Independence activist, led attacks against Dutch forces during the National Revolution	
Andi Mappanyukki	1885	1967	2004	Bugis nobleman, led attacks against Dutch forces, father of Andi Abdullah Bau Massepe	
Antasari	1809	1862	1968	Fought against Dutch colonial forces in the Banjarmasin War	
Arie Frederik Lasut	1918	1949	1969	Geologist and educator who was executed by the Dutch	
Arnoldus Isaac Zacharias Mononutu	1896	1983	2020	Information minister	
As'ad Syamsul Arifin	1897	1990	2016	Islamic Leader, co-founder of Nahdlatul Ulama	
Sultan Baabullah	15th century	1583	2020	Ruler of Sultanate of Ternate; repelled Portuguese hegemony from Ternate	
Bagindo Azizchan	1910	1947	2005	Mayor of Padang, resisted Dutch forces during the National Revolution	
Basuki Rahmat	1921	1969	1969	General, witness to the Supersemar	
Bataha Santiago	1622	1675	2023	The third king of Manganitu Kingdom in Sangihe Islands who fought against Dutch colonial forces	
Bernard Wilhelm Lapian	1892	1977	2015	Nationalist, church leader, and second governor of Sulawesi	
Teungku Chik di Tiro	1836	1891	1973	Acehnese Islamic figure and guerrilla leader who fought against Dutch colonial forces	
Cilik Riwut	1918	1987	1998	Soldier and politician, promoted economic and cultural development in Central Kalimantan	
Cipto Mangunkusumo	1886	1943	1964	Javanese politician, mentor to Sukarno	
Cokroaminoto	1883	1934	1961	Politician, leader of Sarekat Islam, mentor to Sukarno	
Ernest Douwes Dekker	1879	1950	1961	Indo journalist and politician who advocated Indonesian independence	(Note: Also known by the Sundanese name Danudirja Setiabudi)
Depati Amir	1805	1869	2018	Independence fighter from Bangka	
Andi Depu Maraddia Balanipa	1907	1985	2018	Female figure from West Sulawesi who led fighters for independence	
Dewi Sartika	1884	1947	1966	Educator, established the country's first school for girls	
Cut Nyak Dhien	1850	1908	1964	Acehnese guerrilla leader who fought against Dutch colonial forces; wife of Teuku Umar	
Diponegoro	1785	1855	1973	Son of the Sultan of Yogyakarta, fought a five-year war against Dutch colonial forces	
Donald Isaac Panjaitan	1925	1965	1965	General in the Army, killed by the 30 September Movement	
Fakhruddin	1890	1929	1964	Islamic leader, negotiated protection of Indonesian hajj pilgrims	
Fatmawati	1923	1980	2000	Sewed the first national flag, social activist, a wife of Sukarno	
Ferdinand Lumban Tobing	1899	1962	1962	Doctor and politician, fought for the rights of forced labourers	
Frans Kaisiepo	1921	1979	1993	Papuan nationalist who helped in the acquisition of Papua	
Frans Seda	1926	2009	2026	Politician, freedom fighter	
Gatot Mangkupraja	1896	1968	2004	Independence activist and politician, suggested the formation of Defenders of the Homeland	
Gatot Subroto	1907	1962	1962	General, deputy chief-of-staff of the Army	
Halim Perdanakusuma	1922	1947	1975	Early figure in the Air Force, died in an accidental plane crash in Perak, Malaysia during the National Revolution	
Hamengkubuwono I	1717	1792	2006	Sultan of Yogyakarta, fought against the Dutch East India Company, established Yogyakarta	
Hamengkubuwono IX	1912	1988	1990	Sultan of Yogyakarta, independence activist, military leader, and politician; 2nd vice president of Indonesia	
Harun Thohir	1947	1968	1968	Bombed the Hong Kong and Shanghai Bank building in Singapore during the Indonesia–Malaysia confrontation	(Note: Also known as Harun Tahir)
Hasan Basri	1923	1984	2001	Soldier during the Indonesian National Revolution, supported the integration of Kalimantan in Indonesia	
Hasanuddin	1631	1670	1973	Sultan of Gowa, fought against Dutch colonial forces	
Hasyim Asy'ari	1875	1947	1964	Islamic leader, founder of Nahdlatul Ulama	
Hazairin	1906	1975	1999	Legal scholar, independence activist, government minister, and educator	
Herman Johannes	1912	1992	2009	Engineer, made weapons for the National Revolution, co-founded Gadjah Mada University	
Sultan Himayatuddin Muhammad Saidi	18th century	1776	2019	Sultan of Buton who protested against a deal with the Dutch East India Company (VOC)	
Hoegeng Iman Santoso	1922	2004	2026	The 5th National Police chief, renowned for being the most courageous and honest police official in the nation, in a time when a majority of government officials were corrupt	
Ibrahim Chaliluddin	1858	1930	2026	The last Sultan of Paser, leader of an uprising against Dutch colonial authority	
Ida Anak Agung Gde Agung	1921	1999	2007	Independence activist, diplomat, and government minister	
Ida Dewa Agung Jambe	1855	1908	2023		
Idham Chalid	1921	2010	2011	Leader of Nahdlatul Ulama, politician	
Ilyas Yakoub	1903	1958	1999	Independence activist, politician, and guerrilla fighter	
Tuanku Imam Bonjol	1772	1864	1973	Islamic figure from West Sumatra who fought against Dutch colonial forces in the Padri War	
Radin Inten II	1834	1856	1986	Nobleman from Lampung, led a revolution against Dutch colonists	
Iskandar Muda	1593	1636	1993	Sultan of Aceh, expanded the state's influence	(Note: Year of birth uncertain. Some sources, such as Encyclopædia Britannica, give 1590.)
Ismail Marzuki	1914	1958	2004	Composer known for numerous patriotic songs	
Iswahyudi	1918	1947	1975	Early figure in the Air Force, killed during the National Revolution	
Iwa Kusumasumantri	1899	1971	2002	Independence activist, lawyer, and politician, first Minister of Social Affairs	
Izaak Huru Doko	1913	1985	2006	Independence activist and educator, helped establish Udayana University	
Jamin Ginting	1921	1974	2014	Politician and military officer in Sumatra during the National Revolution	
Janatin	1943	1968	1968	Bombed the Hong Kong and Shanghai Bank building in Singapore during the Indonesia–Malaysia confrontation	(Note: Also known as Usman bin Haji Muhammad Ali.)
Jatikusumo	1917	1992	2002	Member of the Pakubuwono royal family of Surakarta, general in the Army and politician	
Johannes Abraham Dimara	1916	2000	2010	Papuan army officer who helped in the acquisition of Papua	
Johannes Leimena	1905	1977	2010	Early Minister of Health, developed the Puskesmas clinic system	
Juanda Kartawijaya	1911	1963	1963	Sundanese politician, final Prime Minister of Indonesia	
Karel Satsuit Tubun	1928	1965	1965	Police brigadier, killed by the 30 September Movement	
Ignatius Joseph Kasimo	1900	1986	2011	Independence activist, Catholic Party leader	
Kasman Singodimedjo	1904	1982	2018	Muhammadiyah figure, who united the nation during the UUD 1945 Constitution ratification process by the Preparatory Committee for Indonesian Independence. Later served as chair of the Central Indonesian National Committee, the precursor of the People's Representative Council and as Justice Undersecretary.	
Katamso Darmokusumo	1923	1965	1965	General in the Army, killed by the 30 September Movement	
I Gusti Ketut Jelantik	18th century	1849	1993	Balinese leader who fought against Dutch colonial forces	
I Gusti Ketut Puja	1904	1957	2011	First Governor of Sunda Kecil Province	
Ki Bagus Hadikusumo	1890	1954	2015		
Ki Hajar Dewantara	1889	1959	1959	Educator and state minister, established Taman Siswa, brother of Raden Mas Suryopranoto	
Ki Sarmidi Mangunsarkoro	1904	1957	2011	Educator with Budi Utomo and Taman Siswa, government minister	
Kiras Bangun	1852	1942	2005	Batak guerrilla leader who fought the Dutch colonialists	
Kyai Maja	1792	1849	2026	Islamic cleric, militia leader during the Java War	
La Maddukelleng	1700	1765	1998	Nobleman from Paser Sultanate, repelled Dutch forces from Wajo Kingdom	
Lafran Pane	1922	1991	2017	Founded the Muslim Students' Association	
Lambertus Nicodemus Palar	1900	1981	2013	Diplomat, negotiated recognition of Indonesia during the Revolution	
Yahya Daniel Dharma	1911	1988	2009	Rear Admiral in the Navy, smuggled products to fund the National Revolution	
Mahmud Singgirei Rumagesan	1885	1964	2020	Monarch of Sultanate of Sekar (now in Fakfak Regency, West Papua) who advocated for integration of Western New Guinea into Indonesia	
Mahmud Badaruddin II	1767	1852	1984	Sultan of Palembang, fought against Dutch colonial forces	
Sultan Mahmud Riayat Syah	1760	1812	2017	Sultan of Riau Lingga, fought against Dutch colonial forces	
Malahayati	15th century	early 16th century	2017	Female admiral in the navy of the Aceh Sultanate, fought against Cornelis de Houtman	
Mangkunegara I	1725	1795	1988	Fought against Dutch colonists and collaborators in Central Java	
Maraden Panggabean	1922	2000	2026	Prominent army general	
Maria Walanda Maramis	1872	1924	1969	Women's rights advocate and educator	
Margono Djojohadikusumo	1894	1978	2026	Founder of a state-owned bank Bank Negara Indonesia, the first chairman of Supreme Advisory Council	
Marsinah	1969	1993	2025	Labor activist	
Martha Christina Tiahahu	1800	1818	1969	Guerrilla fighter from Maluku who died in Dutch custody	
Marthen Indey	1912	1986	1993	Nationalist and independence activist, promoted Papuan integration in Indonesia	
Mas Isman	1924	1982	2015	Revolutionary who commanded students paramilitary TRI Pelajar during independence war	
Mas Mansur	1896	1946	1964	Islamic scholar, Muhammadiyah leader	
Masykur	1917	1994	2019	Member of BPUPK, founder of PETA, government minister	
Mas Tirtodarmo Haryono	1924	1965	1965	General in the Army, killed by the 30 September Movement	
Maskun Sumadireja	1907	1986	2004	Independence activist and politician	
Raden Mattaher	1871	1907	2020		
Cut Nyak Meutia	1870	1910	1964	Acehnese guerrilla leader who fought against Dutch colonial forces	
Mochtar Kusumaatmadja	1929	2021	2025	Diplomat and politician	
Mohammad Srudji	1915	1949	2026	Army officer during the independence war	
Mohammad Hatta	1902	1980	2012	Independence activist, 1st vice president of Indonesia	(Note: Previously declared a Proclamation Hero in 1986)
Mohammad Husni Thamrin	1894	1941	1960	Politician and independence activist	
Mohammad Jusuf	1928	2004	2026	Prominent army general	
Mohammad Natsir	1908	1993	2008	Islamic scholar and politician, fifth Prime Minister of Indonesia	
Mohammad Roem	1908	1983	2026	Politician, diplomat	
Mohammad Tabrani Soerjowitjirto	1904	1984	2023	Indonesian journalist and politician, major proponent of the Indonesian language as a national language.	
Mohammad Yamin	1903	1962	1973	Poet turned politician and independence activist	
Muhammad Ali Abdul Jalil Muazzam Syah		1791	2026	Sultan of Siak, fought several times with the Dutch forces	
Teuku Muhammad Hasan	1906	1997	2006	Independence activist, first governor of Sumatra	
Muhammad Mangundiprojo	1905	1988	2014		
Sultan Muhammad Salahuddin	1889	1951	2025		
Muhammad Yasin	1920	2012	2015	Regarded as the founder of Indonesian Police's Mobile Brigade Corps	
Muhammad Zainuddin Abdul Madjid	1898	1997	2017	Islamic scholar and Nahdlatul Wathan founder	
Mustopo	1913	1986	2007	Leader during the Battle of Surabaya, established Dr. Moestopo Dental College	
Muwardi	1907	1948	1964	Handled security for the Proclamation of Independence, established a hospital in Surakarta	
Nani Wartabone	1907	1986	2003	Independence activist and politician, helped put down the Permesta rebellion	
I Gusti Ngurah Made Agung	1876	1906	2015	Balinese fighter against the Dutch colonials	
I Gusti Ngurah Rai	1917	1946	1975	Balinese military leader during National Revolution	
Nuku Muhammad Amiruddin	1738	1805	1995	Sultan of Tidore, led several naval battles against Dutch colonial forces	
Nur Ali	1914	1992	2006	Islamic leader and educator, led student soldiers during the National Revolution	
Teuku Nyak Arif	1899	1946	1974	Acehnese politician and resistance leader, first governor of Aceh	
Opu Daeng Risaju	1880	1964	2006	Early woman politician, fought against the Dutch during the National Revolution	
Oto Iskandar di Nata	1897	1945	1973	Politician and independence activist	
Pajonga Daeng Ngalle Polobangkeng	1901	1958	2006	Coordinated attacks in South Sulawesi during the National Revolution, promoted integration	
Paku Alam VIII	1910	1998	2022	Vice Governor of Yogyakarta, independence activist, and politician	
Pakubuwono VI	1807	1849	1964	Susuhunan of Surakarta, rebelled against Dutch colonial forces	
Pakubuwono X	1866	1939	2011	Susuhunan of Surakarta, supported various projects which furthered Native Indonesian interests	
Pangeran Muhammad Noor	1901	1979	2018	Banjar Prince, guerrilla fighter, 1st Governor of Kalimantan & former Minister of Public Works	
Pattimura	1783	1817	1973	Guerrilla from Maluku who fought against Dutch colonial forces	
Pierre Tendean	1939	1965	1965	Soldier in the Army, killed by the 30 September Movement	
Pong Tiku	1846	1907	2002	Torajan noble, fought against Dutch colonialists	
Raden Ajeng Kartini	1879	1904	1964	Javanese women's rights figure	
Raden Aria Wangsakara		1721	2021	Indonesian cleric and nobleman, regarded as the founder of Tangerang and defended the region from Dutch attack in the early 18th century	
Raden Eddy Martadinata	1921	1966	1966	Admiral in the Navy and diplomat, killed in a helicopter crash	
Raden Mas Suryopranoto	1871	1959	1959	Education and workers' rights figure, brother of Ki Hajar Dewantara	
Raden Mas Tumenggung Ario Suryo	1896	1948	1964	First Governor of East Java during the National Revolution	
Raden Panji Suroso	1893	1981	1986	Politician and independence activist, first Governor of Central Java	
Raden Said Sukanto Cokrodiatmojo	1908	1993	2020	First Chief of the Indonesian National Police	
Sarwo Edhie Wibowo	1925	1989	2025	Military leader	
Sudirman	1916	1950	1964	Commander in Chief of the Indonesian Armed Forces for most of the National Revolution	(Note: 1916 is the date recognised by the Indonesian government. The actual date may be different. Several sources, for example, give 1912 (Said 1991, p. 80).)
Syaikhona Muhammad Kholil	1835	1925	2025		
Raden Suleiman Effendi Kusumahatmaja	1898	1952	1965	First Chief Justice of the Supreme Court of Indonesia	
Rahmah el Yunusiyah	1900	1969	2025	Women's education and empowerment activist	
Raja Ali Haji	1809	c. 1870	2004	Historian and poet from Riau	
Raja Haji Fisabilillah	1727	1784	1997	Warrior from Riau who fought against Dutch colonial forces	
Rajiman Wediodiningrat	1879	1952	2013	First head of the People's Representative Council	
Ranggong Daeng Romo	1915	1947	2001	Led troops in two battles against Dutch forces during the National Revolution	
Ratu Kalinyamat	1520	1579	2023		
Rasuna Said	1910	1965	1974	Women's rights advocate and nationalist	
Rubini Natawisastra	1906	1944	2022	Medical doctor, killed during Mandor affair	
Robert Wolter Mongisidi	1925	1949	1973	Guerrilla fighter in Makassar during the National Revolution, executed by the Dutch	
Rohana Kudus	1884	1972	2019	First female journalist, activist for education and women's emancipation.	
Rondahaim Saragih Garingging	1828	1891	2025		
Saharjo	1909	1963	1963	Minister of Justice, pioneered legal reform in the country	
Salahuddin bin Talabuddin	1874	1948	2022	North Maluku politician and supporter of Indonesian independence, executed by the Dutch	
Sam Ratulangi	1890	1949	1961	Minahasa politician and supporter of Indonesian independence	
Samanhudi	1878	1956	1961	Businessman, established Sarekat Islam	
Sardjito	1889	1970	2019	First rector of Gadjah Mada University	
Silas Papare	1918	1978	1993	Fought for Papua's independence from the Dutch, promoted Papuan integration in Indonesia	
Sisingamangaraja XII	1849	1907	1961	Batak leader who fought a lengthy guerrilla campaign against Dutch colonial forces	
Siswondo Parman	1918	1965	1965	General in the Army, killed by the 30 September Movement	
Siti Hartinah	1923	1996	1996	Wife of president Suharto, active in social work, established Taman Mini Indonesia Indah	
Syam'un	1894	1949	2018	Islamic scholar, guerrilla fighter for independence.	
Siti Walidah	1872	1946	1971	Founder of Aisyiyah, Muhammadiyah figure, wife of Ahmad Dahlan,	(Note: Generally noted as Nyai Ahmad Dahlan, meaning "wife of Ahmad Dahlan")
Slamet Riyadi	1927	1950	2007	Brigadier General in the Army, killed while putting down a rebellion in Sulawesi	
Sugiyono Mangunwiyoto	1926	1965	1965	Colonel in the Army, killed by the 30 September Movement	
Soeharto Sastrosoeyoso	1908	2000	2022	Medical doctor, founder of Indonesian Medical Association	
Suharso	1912	1971	1973	Medical pioneer in prosthetics	
Suharto	1921	2008	2025	Second president of Indonesia, Grand general of the Army	
Sukarjo Wiryopranoto	1903	1962	1962	Independence figure, diplomat, and politician	
Sukarni	1916	1971	2014	Youth leader and activist	
Sukarno	1901	1970	2012	First president of Indonesia, Independence activist, orator, proclamator of the Independence	
Sultan Agung	1591	1645	1975	Sultan of Mataram, fought against encroachment by the Dutch East India Company	
Andi Sultan Daeng Raja	1894	1963	2006	Independence activist and politician	
Sungkono	1911	1977	2026	Prominent military officer during the independence war	
Supeno	1916	1949	1970	Government minister, killed while fighting against the Dutch during the National Revolution	
Supomo	1903	1958	1965	First Minister of Justice, helped write the Constitution	
Suprapto	1920	1965	1965	General in the Army, killed by the 30 September Movement	
Supriyadi	1925	1945	1975	Leader of a rebellion against the Japanese occupation forces in Blitar	(Note: Date of death uncertain; he disappeared in 1945.)
Suryadi Suryadarma	1912	1975	2026	The first chief of Indonesian Air Force	
Sutan Mohammad Amin Nasution	1904	1993	2020	First governor of North Sumatra	
Sutan Syahrir	1909	1966	1966	Politician, first Prime Minister of Indonesia	
Sutan Takdir Alisjahbana	1908	1994	2026	Renowned author	
Sutomo	1888	1938	1961	Javanese educator, established Budi Utomo	(Note: Most often referred to as Dr. Sutomo)
Sutomo	1920	1981	2008	Military officer who led troops in the Battle of Surabaya	(Note: Also known as Bung Tomo)
Sutoyo Siswomiharjo	1922	1965	1965	General in the Army, killed by the 30 September Movement	
Syafruddin Prawiranegara	1911	1989	2011	First governor of Bank Indonesia	
Syarif Kasim II	1893	1968	1998	Sultan of Siak, promoted integration of the East Sumatran kingdoms	
Tahi Bonar Simatupang	1920	1990	2013	General who served as chief of staff from 1950 to 1954	
Tuanku Tambusai	1784	1882	1995	Islamic leader from Riau who fought against Dutch colonial forces in the Padri War	
Tan Malaka	1884	1949	1963	Minang politician and communist activist	
Thaha Syaifuddin	1816	1904	1977	Sultan of Jambi, led an armed revolution against Dutch colonial forces	
Tirtayasa	1631	1683	1970	Guerrilla from Banten who fought against the Dutch	
Tirto Adhi Suryo	1880	1918	2006	Early journalist, exiled for his anti-Dutch editorials	
Tengku Amir Hamzah	1911	1946	1975	Langkat royal family member, poet, nationalist; victim of the East Sumatra Social Revolution	
Teuku Umar	1854	1899	1973	Acehnese guerrilla leader, fought against Dutch colonial forces; husband of Cut Nyak Dhien	
Tombolotutu	1857	1901	2021	Monarch of the Kingdom of Moutong who fought a guerilla campaign against Dutch colonial government from 1898–1901	
Untung Surapati	1660	1706	1975	Led several rebellions against the Dutch East India Company	
Urip Sumoharjo	1893	1948	1964	Early leader of Indonesian Armed Forces, second in command to Sudirman	
Usmar Ismail	1921	1971	2021	Indonesian journalist and film director, regarded as the Father of Indonesian Cinema	
Wage Rudolf Supratman	1903	1938	1971	Composer of the national anthem "Indonesia Raya"	
Wahid Hasyim	1914	1953	1964	Leader of Nahdlatul Ulama, first Minister of Religion of Indonesia	
Wahidin Sudirohusodo	1852	1917	1973	Doctor and leader in Budi Utomo	
Wasyid	1843	1888	2026	Islamic cleric, leader of an uprising against Dutch colonial authority	
Wilhelmus Zakaria Johannes	1895	1952	1968	Medical pioneer in radiology	
Yos Sudarso	1925	1962	1973	Navy Commodore, killed in a confrontation with the Dutch over Netherlands New Guinea	
Yusuf Hasyim	1929	2007	2026	Islamic cleric, independence activist	
Yusuf Tajul Khalwati	1626	1699	1995	Islamic leader, led a guerrilla rebellion against the Dutch East India Company	
Zainal Abidin Syah	1912	1967	2025		
Zainal Mustafa	1907	1944	1972	Islamic leader who fought against the Japanese occupation forces	
Zainul Arifin	1909	1963	1963	Politician and guerrilla fighter, killed by an assassin targeting Sukarno	

== Works cited ==
- Artaria, Myrtati Diah (2002). "Heroes and Heroines". In Chambert-Loir, Henri; Reid, Anthony (eds.). The Potent Dead: Ancestors, Saints and Heroes in Contemporary Indonesia. University of Hawaii Press. pp. 538–540. ISBN 978-1-86508-739-9.
- "Abdul Muis". Encyclopedia of Jakarta (in Indonesian). Jakarta City Government. Archived from the original on 2 March 2013.
- Aritonang, Margareth S. (12 November 2012). "Sukarno, Hatta national heroes at last". The Jakarta Post. Archived from the original on 10 November 2012.
- "Daftar Nama Pahlawan Nasional Republik Indonesia (1)" [List of Names of National Heroes of the Republic of Indonesia (1)]. Awards of the Republic of Indonesia (in Indonesian). Indonesian State Secretariat. Archived from the original on 14 April 2012.
- "Daftar Nama Pahlawan Nasional Republik Indonesia (2)" [List of Names of National Heroes of the Republic of Indonesia (2)]. Awards of the Republic of Indonesia (in Indonesian). Indonesian State Secretariat. Archived from the original on 21 January 2013.
- "Doctor, Army Officer Named National Heroes". The Jakarta Post. 12 November 2010. Archived from the original on 21 May 2013.
- "Editorial: Respect Thy Heroes". The Jakarta Post. 10 November 2012. Archived from the original on 21 May 2013.
- "Govt Gives Posthumous Honor to Heroes". The Jakarta Post. 9 November 2011. Archived from the original on 21 May 2013.
- "Iskandar Muda". Encyclopædia Britannica Online.
- Kamajaya (1981). Lima Putera-Puteri Aceh Pahlawan Nasional [Five Sons and Daughters of Aceh that are National Heroes] (in Indonesian). Yogyakarta: U.P. Indonesia. OCLC 65644873.
- Mirnawati (2012). Kumpulan Pahlawan Indonesia Terlengkap [Most Complete Collection of Indonesian Heroes] (in Indonesian). Jakarta: CIF. ISBN 978-979-788-343-0.
- Parlina, Ina (9 November 2013). "Govt names three new national heroes". The Jakarta Post. Archived from the original on 11 November 2013.
- "Prosedur Penganugerahan Gelar Pahlawan Nasional" [Procedure for Awarding the Title of National Hero]. Awards of the Republic of Indonesia (in Indonesian). Indonesian State Secretariat. Archived from the original on 28 December 2011.
- "Presiden Jokowi Anugerahkan Gelar Pahlawan Nasional". Setneg.go.id (in Indonesian). Ministry of State Secretariat. 10 November 2014.
- "Jokowi Anugerahkan Gelar Pahlawan Nasional Ke Lima Tokoh". CNN Indonesia (in Indonesian). 5 November 2015.
- "Moehammad Jasin: Bapak Brimob, Spesialis Penumpas Separatisme". Tirto.id (in Indonesian). 3 May 2018.
- "As'ad Syamsul Arifin Dianugerahi Gelar Pahlawan Nasional". Kompas.com (in Indonesian). 9 November 2016.
- Said, Salim (1991). Genesis of Power: General Sudirman and the Indonesian Military in Politics, 1945–49. Singapore: Institute of Southeast Asian Studies. ISBN 978-981-3035-90-4.
- Sudarmanto, J. B. (2007). Jejak-Jejak Pahlawan: Perekat Kesatuan Bangsa Indonesia [Footsteps of the Heroes: Uniting the Indonesian People] (in Indonesian). Jakarta: Grasindo. ISBN 978-979-759-716-0.
- Undang-Undang Republik Indonesia Nomor 20 Tahun 2009 tentang Gelar, Tanda Jasa, dan Tanda Kehormatan [Law of the Republic of Indonesia Number 20 of 2009 Regarding Titles, Awards, and Recognition] (PDF). Jakarta: Government of Indonesia. 18 June 2009. Archived from the original (PDF) on 11 December 2012.
- "Ini Kiprah 4 Pahlawan Nasional yang Baru Dinobatkan Tahun Ini". Detik.com (in Indonesian).
- "Presiden Anugerahkan Gelar Pahlawan kepada 4 Tokoh Nasional". Kominfo (in Indonesian). Kementerian Komunikasi dan Informatika Indonesia. 9 November 2017. Archived from the original on 13 February 2023.
- "President awards title of national hero to six figures". Antara. 8 November 2018.
- "Jokowi confers National Hero titles on first UGM rector, five figures". Antara. 8 November 2019.
- "Jokowi to name six historical figures as national heroes". Antara.
- "Machmud Singgirei Rumagesan, Pahlawan Nasional Pertama Dari Papua Barat". Detik.com (in Indonesian).
- "President Jokowi Names Four Historical Figures as National Heroes". Sekretariat Kabinet Republik Indonesia. 10 November 2021.
- "Usmar Ismail, Bapak Perfilman Indonesia Yang Jadi Pahlawan Nasional". CNN Indonesia (in Indonesian).
- "Profil Tombolotutu, Raja Asal Sulteng yang Diberi Gelar Pahlawan Nasional". Kumparan (in Indonesian).
- "Siapakah Sosok Raden Aria Wangsakara Yang Belum Lama Ini Dinobatkan Sebagai Pahlawan Nasional Oleh Jokowi?". bantenekspose.id (in Indonesian). 6 November 2021.
- "Sosok Sultan Aji Muhammad Idris, Raja Kutai yang Diberi Gelar Pahlawan 2021". Medcom.id (in Indonesian). 10 November 2021.
