= Andi Depu =

Indonesian revolutionary (born 1907)

- Born: Andi Depu Marradia Balanipa; August 1, 1907; Tinambung, Polewali Mandar, Dutch East Indies
- Died: June 18, 1985 (aged 77); Makassar, South Sulawesi, Indonesia
- Honours: National Hero of Indonesia

Andi Depu (August 1, 1907 – June 18, 1985) was an Indonesian revolutionary and leader of the Mandarese people against the Dutch during the Indonesian National Revolution. She was the first female high king or Maharani in Indonesia.

== Early life ==
Depu was born on August 1, 1907, in Tinambung, Polewali Mandar, in present-day West Sulawesi. She was a royal child of the 50th king of Balanipa, Laqju Kanna Idoro. As a child, Depu enjoyed climbing trees, riding horses and playing war games. She was also sociable and enjoyed hanging out with different people in Mandar.

== Revolution ==
In 1923, Andi Depu married Andi Baso Pabiseang. Her married life eventually turned strained because of their contradicting beliefs—she was willing to defend the land against Dutch imperialism, while her husband was in favor of Dutch colonial governance over the Indonesian Archipelago—leading to their divorce. Depu and her son, Andi Parenrengi, joined the movement against the government of the Dutch East Indies. Depu did not raise much suspicion as a dissident due to her gender. In 1939, Depu was crowned as ruler of Balanipa.

After Imperial Japan overthrew the Dutch during World War II, Depu led the establishment of the pro-Japanese Fujinkai in Mandar to tackle the struggles of women in the region. She was also an active supporter of the Islamic youth organization Jong Islamieten Bond.

Depu founded and led the Kris Muda (English: Young Kris), with the goal of defending Indonesia's independence following the proclamation of Indonesian Independence in 1945. The movement expanded to a number of places outside Mandar.

When the Dutch returned to the East Indies after the end of the Japanese occupation, Depu made the Balanipa Palace the headquarters for Indonesian independence fighters in Mandar. Under her leadership, she was momentarily able to defend Mandar from reassertion of Dutch control. In one instance, the Dutch army saw the flag of Indonesia raised on a small pole in front of her house and demanded she lower it, but Depu grabbed the flag and waved it in front of them as a sign of defiance.

In the end, however, the Dutch were able to capture Depu. In December 1949, she was arrested by the Netherlands Indies Civil Administration and was tortured. She was later released.

== Death ==
Depu died on June 18, 1985, and was buried at the Panaikang Heroes Cemetery in Makassar.
