= Pajonga Daeng Ngalle =

Indonesian politician

Pajonga Daeng Ngalle also known with his title Karaeng Polongbangkeng (1901 – 23 February 1958) was the 12th Karaeng (ruler) of Polongbangkeng and Indonesian revolutionary figure from South Sulawesi.

Ngalle founded the Laskar Gerakan Muda Bajoang movement which rejected the Dutch colonists. Posthumously, he was recognised as a National Hero of Indonesia (Pahlawan Nasional) and Bintang Maha Putra Adipradana in 2006.

== Early life ==
Ngalle was born in Takalar, South Sulawesi in 1901. He was the son of Hajina Daeng Massaung Karaeng Ilangari Mangkura and Hapipah Daeng Ngintang, South Sulawesi aristocrats from Polongbangkeng.

== Career ==
In 1934, Ngalle became the 12th Karaeng Polongbangkeng, the head of the district government in Polongbangkeng.

He participated in the conference held by South Sulawesi royals in October 1945 with Andi Mappanyukki and Andi Pangerang Petta Rani of Bone, Andi Djemma of Luwu, Andi Abdullah Bau Massepe of Suppa, which resulted in a pledge to support republican government under Governor Sam Ratulangi and rejection Dutch authority. He founded the movement Laskar Gerakan Muda Bajoang and helped coordinate attacks in South Sulawesi from his base in Polongbangkeng, Takalar during the National Revolution to promote integration with Indonesia and resist Dutch and Allied forces.

== Death ==
Ngalle died on 23 February 1958 in Takalar, South Sulawesi.

He was posthumously conferred the award of National Hero of Indonesia (Pahlawan Nasional) by President Susilo Bambang Yudhoyono and Bintang Maha Putra Adipradana in 2006. He was also memorialized with a statue in Takalar Regency.
