= Temenggung Setia Pahlawan =

National Hero of Indonesia

Abdul Kadir Raden Temenggung Setia Pahlawan (1771–1875) was a nobleman from Melawi. He fostered economic development in his region and fought against colonial Dutch. With the Presidential Decree No. 114/TK/1999 released on 13 October 1999, he was given the title of a National Hero of Indonesia. He was the only Indonesian National Hero to die aged over 100. He died aged 104, just 3 weeks after being captured by the Dutch.
