= KH Fakhruddin =

National Hero of Indonesia

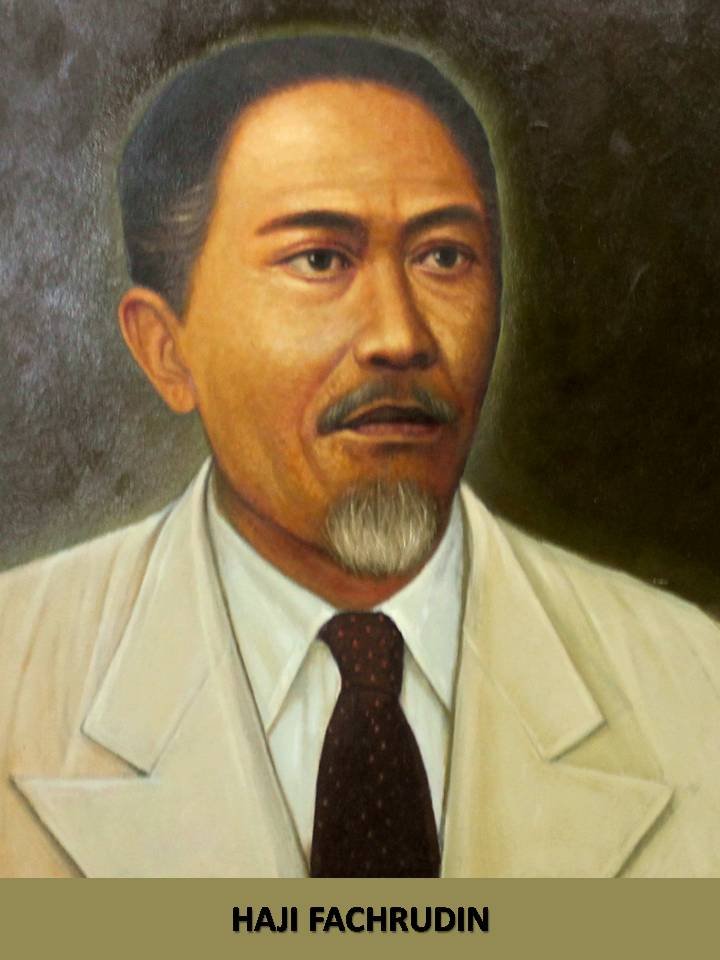
Haji Fakhrudin

KH Fakhruddin (born Muhammad Jazuli, 1890 – 28 February 1929) was an Indonesian Islamic leader. He is regarded as a National Hero of Indonesia. He initiated the Badan Penolong Haji (Hajj Helper Agency) to help Indonesians who are conducting hajj in Mecca.
