= Pong Tiku =

Torajan guerrilla fighter (1846–1907)

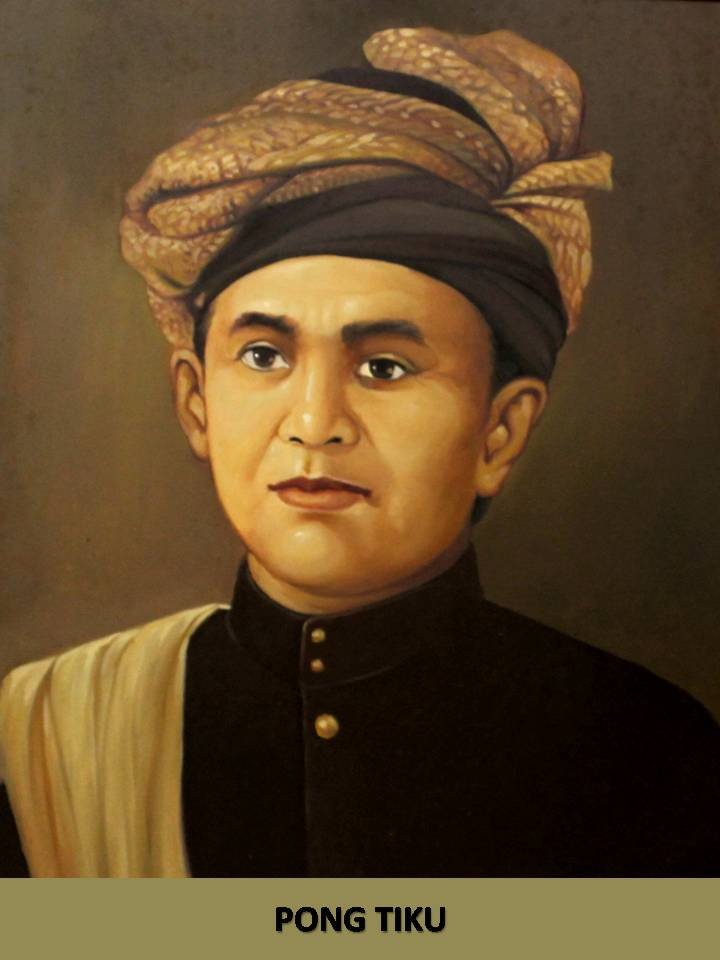
- Sketch of Tiku
- Born: c. 1846 near Rantepao, Sulawesi
- Died: 10 July 1907 (aged 60–61); Tondon, Tana Toraja, Dutch East Indies
- Resting place: Tondon, Tana Toraja
- Occupation: Guerilla Leader
- Years active: 1880–1907

Pong Tiku (also spelled Pontiku and Pongtiku; c. 1846 – 10 July 1907), known among his Buginese allies as Ne' Baso, was a Torajan leader and guerrilla fighter who operated in southern Sulawesi, part of modern-day Indonesia.

The son of the lord of Pangala', after Tiku captured the neighbouring kingdom Baruppu' he became its leader, later ruling Pangala' after his father's death. By exploiting the coffee trade and allying with the lowlands Buginese, Tiku was able to obtain large amounts of wealth, land, and power. During the Coffee War (1889–1890), his capital at Tondon was razed by another lord, but retaken the same day. When the Dutch colonials, based in Java, invaded Sulawesi in the early 1900s, Tiku and his soldiers utilised fortresses to withstand and launch attacks. Captured in October 1906, in January 1907 he escaped and remained at large until June. He was executed several days later.

Tiku was the longest lasting resistance leader in Sulawesi, such that Governor-General J. B. van Heutsz considered him damaging the stability of Dutch control over the region and dispatched the Governor of Sulawesi to oversee his capture. Since his death, Tiku has been used as a symbol of Torajan resistance. Long commemorated in Sulawesi, he was officially declared a National Hero of Indonesia in 2002.

== Early life and rise to power ==
Tiku was born near Rantepao in the highlands of Sulawesi (now part of North Toraja Regency, South Sulawesi) in 1846. At the time, southern Sulawesi was home to a booming coffee trade and controlled by numerous warlords. Tiku was the last of six children born one of these warlords; he was born to Siambo' Karaeng, lord of Pangala', and his wife Leb'ok. An athletic youth, Tiku was friendly with coffee traders who visited his village.

In 1880, a war broke out between Pangala' and Baruppu', a neighbouring state led by Pasusu. Tiku took an active role in a successful campaign against the neighbouring state, and when Pasusu was defeated Tiku took his place as ruler of Baruppu'. The newly annexed kingdom was rich in rice fields and easily defensible, giving Tiku great power. Although the Torajans traditionally valued manpower and did not kill more people than necessary, Baruppu' oral history describes Tiku as killing men, women, and children with abandon.

When, not long afterwards, Tiku's father died, Tiku became leader of Pangala'. As a leader, Tiku worked to strengthen the economy with an increase in the coffee trade and strategic alliances with predominantly Buginese lowlands groups. The economic success this brought led nearby rulers to respect and envy Tiku.

== Coffee and civil wars ==
Fearing competition from the kingdoms of Luwu and Bone to the north and Sidareng and Sawitto to the south, Tiku worked on reinforcing his country's defences. The kingdoms eventually reached several trade agreements. However, Buginese encroaches led to renewed tensions between the states, climaxing in the Coffee War (Perang Kopi) in 1889. Tiku sided with the Buginese-influenced southern kingdoms.

The Bone military leader Petta Panggawae and his Songko' Borrong soldiers (Note: Named after their hats, which were red. In the local language, songko' means hat and borrong means red.) invaded Pangala' and sided with Pong Maramba', a minor lord. Panggawae overtook Tiku's capital at Tondon and razed the city, leading Tiku and the civilian population to abandon the area. Tiku, having sided with the Sidenreng leader Andi Guru, was able to retake the remains of the capital that night. The war ended in 1890, after Dutch scouts – representing the colonial government on Java – reached Bone. However, the remaining states soon began another series of struggles over the arms and slave trade, where states would exchange weapons for slaves; Tiku also participated in the trade.

Tiku eventually formed an alliance with nearby Buginese leaders, which reduced tensions and improved trade; he also learned the group's writing system and language, allowing him to easily correspond with Buginese leaders. By this time Tiku had captured numerous lands. To avoid a repetition of the raze of Tondon, Tiku began construction of seven fortresses in his lands, as well as several surveillance outposts and storeholds. The Torajan fortresses were designed to prevent entry to the valleys leading to population centres, and Tiku's were divided between the eastern and western parts of his land. He instituted a tax system to fund these defensive measures: owners of rice fields were obligated to tax two-thirds of their produce, while other farmers were taxed ten per cent.

== Dutch advances ==
By 1905 the previously fragmented Buginese and Torajan lands had united into four major areas, one of which was under Tiku. In July of that year the king of Gowa, a nearby state, began collecting soldiers to fight off the invaders and prevent the remainder of the Torajan lands from conquest. Ma'dika Bombing, a leader from a southern state, approached Tiku for his assistance. A month after the messengers had dispersed, the leaders gathered at Gowa to make a plan of action. The result was that the local lords were to stop warring amongst themselves and focus on the Dutch, who had superior strength; these internal conflicts, however, did not completely abate. By the time the meeting adjourned, the Dutch had already begun making advances on Luwu. Tiku, tasked with diverting the Dutch from the indefensible town of Rantepo, began to build his army and work on his defences.

In January 1906 Tiku sent scouts to Sidareng and Sawitto, which the Dutch were invading, to observe their way of battle. When the scouts reported of the Dutch forces' overwhelming strength and seemingly magical powers used against the Bugis soldiers, he ordered his fortresses to increase readiness and begin stocking up on rice; that month, Luwu fell to Dutch forces, who then moved further inland. In February Tiku's men, sent to reinforce the southern kingdoms, reported that there was no longer coherent leadership and that both kingdoms were losing against the Europeans. This convinced Tiku to train more troops and form a nine-member military council, with himself as its leader.

By March 1906 the other kingdoms had all fallen, leaving Tiku as the last Torajan lord. The Dutch took Rantepao without a struggle, unaware that the city's surrender had been arranged by Tiku. Through a letter, the Dutch commander Captain Kilian told Tiku to surrender, a demand Tiku was unwilling to entertain. Aware of Tiku's gathered forces and numerous fortresses, Kilian did not attempt a direct attack. Instead, in April 1906 he sent an expeditionary party to Tondon. Although the party's approach was not resisted, after nightfall Tiku's troops attacked the Dutch camp in Tondon; this forced the Dutch forces to retreat to Rantepao with Tiku's men in pursuit, suffering numerous casualties along the way.

Tiku's military actions were based on the experience he had gained fighting the other lords. The Dutch and their mixed native forces, (Note: The native forces mainly consisted of Ambonese, Batak, Javanese, and Timorese conscripts.) on the other hand, underestimated Tiku's forces and were unable to cope with the cold weather of the high altitudes.

== Initial struggle ==
The failed expeditionary force led to open warfare between Tiku, who went into hiding in his fortress at Buntu Batu, and Dutch troops. Tiku kept spies on the Dutch forces at Rantepao. On 22 June they reported that the preceding night a Dutch battalion consisting of roughly 250 men and 500 porters had departed the village, headed south towards Tiku's fortress at Lali' Londong. Tiku ordered the road sabotaged, extending the travel time from one day to five. On the night of 26 June, Tiku's forces attacked the Dutch forces outside of Lali' Londong, an attack for which the Dutch were unprepared; nobody was killed in the attack. The following morning, the Dutch began a siege on Lali' Londong, using hand grenades and ladders. Unable to deal with the grenades, which the Dutch had not used on the other lords, that afternoon the fortress was captured.

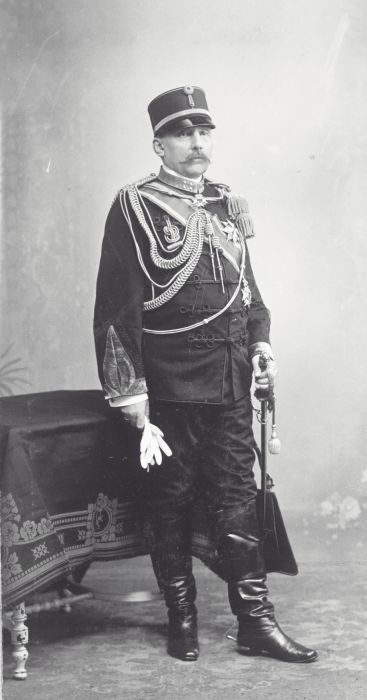
Governor-General J. B. van Heutsz ordered the Governor of Sulawesi to capture Tiku because of a loss of face the guerrilla caused.

This loss led Tiku to reinforce his men. The Torajan troops were armed with rifles, spears, boulders, swords, and chili pepper extract, sprayed into enemy eyes with a device called a tirik lada, or blowgun, to blind them. Tiku himself was armed with a Portuguese rifle, spear, and labo. He wore protective armour, a sepu (crotch guard), and a songkok with protrusions in the shape of buffalo horns, and carried a decorated shield. With his soldiers, Tiku dug pits filled with bamboo stakes along Dutch supply routes; those who wandered over the pits would fall in and be impaled. However, these were not enough to stop the advancing Dutch. On 17 October 1906, two more fortresses, Bamba Puang and Kotu, fell, after several unsuccessful Dutch attacks since June. As the campaign against Tiku, which had already lasted longer than most other campaigns in the occupation, was thought to undermine Dutch authority in Sulawesi, Governor-General J. B. van Heutsz dispatched Governor of Sulawesi Swart to personally lead the attack.

After a long siege, Andi Guru and Tiku's former lieutenant Tandi Bunna' – both by then working for the Dutch – approached Tiku on 26 October and offered a cease fire. Although initially unwilling, Tiku was reportedly convinced by civilians who reminded him that his mother – who had died in the siege – needed to be buried. After three days of peaceful intermingling, on the night of 30 October the Dutch forces took over the fortress, appropriated all weapons, and captured Tiku. He and his soldiers were forced to go to Tondon.

== Second struggle and death ==
In Tondon Tiku began preparations for his mother's funeral, preparations which, in Torajan culture, took several months. While taking care of the preparations, he had an advisor collect weapons secretly while another went to his fortresses in Alla' and Ambeso. Tiku then made preparations to escape Dutch custody; he also returned all property that he had taken as a lord, as he knew he would no longer use it. While in Tondon, Dutch forces may have harassed the Torajan leader. The night before his mother's funeral, in January 1907, Tiku and 300 of his followers escaped Tondon, heading south.

After he was told that the Dutch had followed him, Tiku ordered most of his followers to return to Tondon while he and a group of fifteen, including his two wives, continued south. They first arrived at Ambeso, but the fortress fell several days later, at which time they evacuated to Alla'. This fortress fell at the end of March 1907 and Tiku began to work his way back to Tondon through the forest. He and the other leaders, Buginese and Torajan alike, were chased by Dutch troops. The other leaders capitulated to the Dutch and were sentenced to either three years in a prison in Makassar or exile to Buton. Tiku, meanwhile, stayed hidden in the forests.

On 30 June 1907 Tiku and two of his men were caught by the Dutch forces; he was the last guerrilla leader to be caught. After several days in prison, on 10 July 1907 Tiku was shot and killed by the Dutch soldiers near the Sa'dan River; some reports have him bathing at the time. He was buried with the rest of his family in Tondol, while his cousin Tandibua' became the native ruler of Pangala', serving under the Dutch.

== Legacy ==
After Tiku's death, the colonial powers hoped that he would be forgotten, a hope which was not realised; Tandibua' rebelled in 1917, and other local rebellions arose in different areas of Sulawesi until the Dutch withdrawal following the Japanese occupation. During the occupation, the Japanese forces used Tiku as a symbol of Torajan struggle against colonial aggression, working to unite the people against Europeans. However, this was poorly received in conquered areas such as Baruppu' and Sesean, where Tiku was remembered as a man who killed others to steal their wives.

The Tana Toraja Regency government declared Tiku a national hero in 1964, and in 1970 a monument to him was built on the bank of the Sa'dan. Tiku was declared a National Hero of Indonesia with Presidential Decree 073/TK/2002 on 6 November 2002. On the anniversary of Tiku's death, commemorative ceremonies are held in the provincial capital of Makassar. Aside from several streets, Pongtiku Airport in Tana Toraja is named after him.
