= Achmad Rifa'i =

Islamic thinker and writer

Achmad Rifa'i (1786–1870) was an Islamic thinker and writer known for his anti-Dutch stance. He was registered as a National Hero of Indonesia in 2004.
