= Nyai Ageng Serang =

National Heroine of Indonesia

Raden Ajeng Nyai Ageng Serang
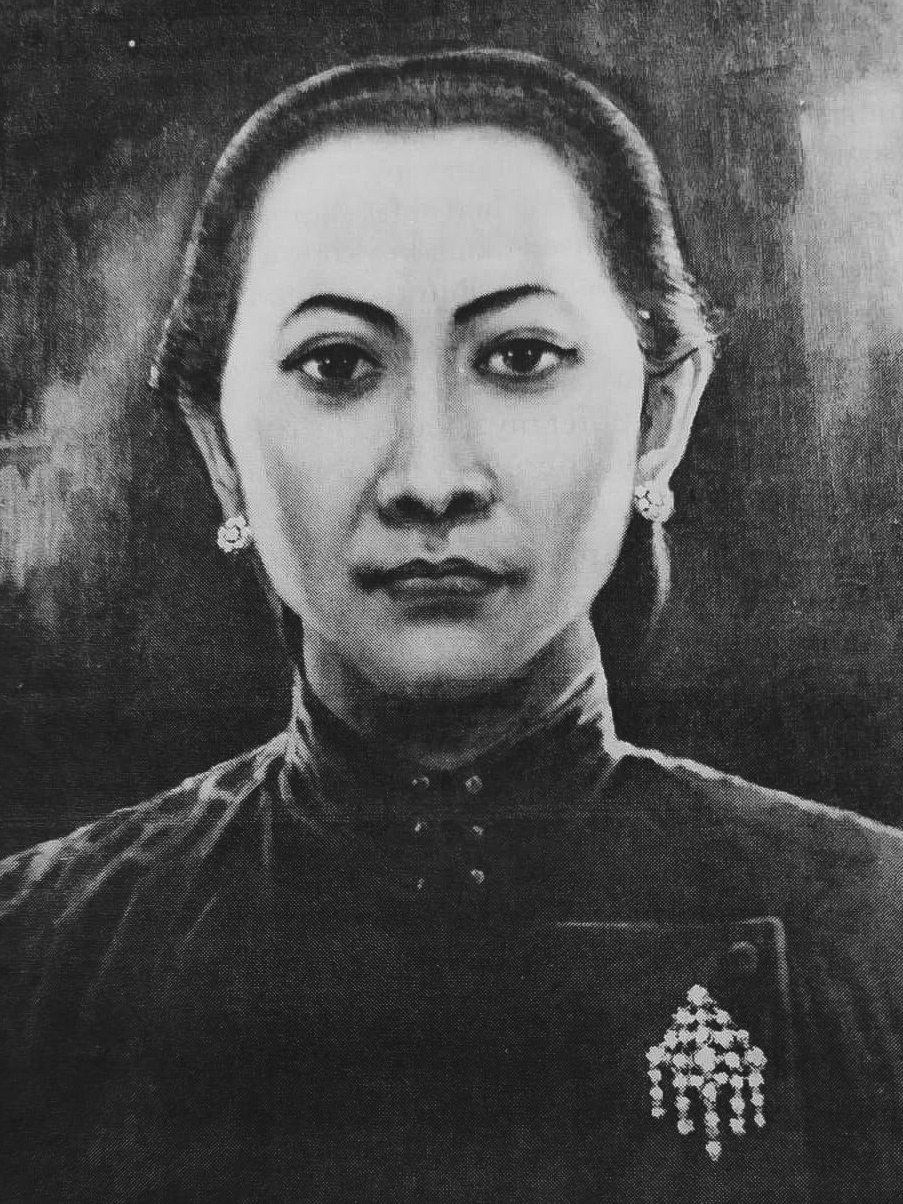
- Born: Raden Ajeng Kustiyah Wulaningsih Retno Edi; October 1, 1752; Sragen, Dutch East Indies
- Died: July 1828; Sultanate of Yogyakarta, Dutch East Indies
- Other names: Bendara Raden Ayu Kustiyah Wulaningsih Retno Edi
- Known for: National Hero of Indonesia

Raden Ajeng Kustiyah Wulaningsih Retno Edhi (1752–1838), better known as Nyai Ageng Serang, is a National Hero of Indonesia.

== Biography ==
Nyai Ageng Serang was born under the name Raden Ajeng Kustiyah Wulaningsih Retno Edhi in Serang (40 kilometres (25 mi) north of Solo), in 1752. Her father was Pangeran Natapraja (also known as Panembahan Serang), a ruler of Serang and Pangeran Mangkubumi's war commander. She was also a descendant of Sunan Kalijaga. The name Nyai Ageng Serang was given to her after her father lived of disease and she took over his position.

She helped her father to fight against the Dutch colonial government, which attacked them because her father still maintained troops, in violation of the Treaty of Giyanti. After the battle, she was arrested and taken to Yogyakarta. Then, she was sent back to Serang.

At the beginning of Diponegoro War in 1825, 73-year-old Nyai Ageng Serang commanded the force on a stretcher to help Pangeran Diponegoro fighting the Dutch. During the war, she was accompanied by her son-in-law, Raden Mas Pak-pak. She also became a war advisor. She fought in several areas, including Purwodadi, Demak, Semarang, Juwana, Kudus, and Rembang. She was also assigned to defend the area of Prambanan from the Dutch. One of her best-known strategies was the use of lumbu (green taro leaves) for disguise. Her forces attached the lumbu to poles to look like a taro orchard. She stopped fighting after 3 years, although her son-in-law continued fighting. Despite fighting the Dutch, beginning in 1833 they gave her an annuity of 100 gulden per month.

She died in Yogyakarta in 1838. Her remains were buried in Beku, Kulon Progo, Yogyakarta.

== Legacy ==
Nyai Ageng Serang was awarded the title National Heroine of Indonesia through Presidential Decree number 084/TK/1974 on 13 December 1974. One of her grandsons, Raden Mas Soewardi Soerjaningrat, is also a national hero. Her name is used for the building of the Culture and Museum Office (Dinas Kebudayaan dan Permuseuman) in South Jakarta.

== Bibliography ==
- Ajisaka, Arya (2008). Mengenal Pahlawan Indonesia. Jakarta: Kawan Pustaka. ISBN 9789797572785.
- Komandoko, Gamal (2006). Kisah 124 Pahlawan dan Pejuang Nusantara. Yogyakarta: Pustaka Widyatama. ISBN 9789796610907.
- Sudarmanto, J. B. (2007). Jejak-Jejak Pahlawan: Perekat Kesatuan Bangsa Indonesia. Jakarta: Grasindo. ISBN 9789797597160.
