= Zainal Mustafa =

Indonesian ulama and National Hero of Indonesia

- Zainal Mustofa
- Born: Umri; 1899; Singaparna, Tasikmalaya, Dutch East Indies
- Died: 25 October 1944 (aged 44–45); Djakarta, Japanese-occupied Dutch East Indies
- Cause of death: Executed
- Resting place: Tasikmalaya
- Occupations: Religious teacher, guerrilla fighter

Kiai Haji Zainal Mustafa (1899 – 25 October 1944), born Umri, and also known as Zainal Mustofa, was an Indonesian ulama and National Hero of Indonesia. He founded the Pesantren Sukamanah when he was 20. He was awarded the title of National Hero in 1972.

== Biography ==
=== Early life and dealing with the Dutch colonial government ===
Zainal Mustafa was born under the name Umri in Singaparna, Tasikmalaya Regency, Dutch East Indies in 1899. He was a santri, an orthodox Javanese Muslim. After attending a standard elementary school, he went on to study at many Islamic schools, which earned him the nickname santri kelana (wandering student). In 1927 he went to Mecca on the hajj; after he returned to Indonesia, he changed his name to Zainal Mustafa. At the age of 20, he founded his own Islamic school named Pesantren Sukamanah. He later served as the Assistant Councillor for the Nahdlatul Ulama branch in Tasikmalaya.

Mustafa was fiercely against the Dutch colonialism due to his Islamic beliefs. He was approached several times by the Dutch colonial government and asked to work with them, yet he refused each time. On 17 November 1941, after a period of censorship and being stalked by the secret police, he and fellow kyai Rukhiyat were arrested by the Dutch colonial government and charged with provoking people to rebel against the Dutch. He was jailed for almost two months in Sukamiskin, Bandung. In February 1942 he was arrested again.

=== Japanese occupation, struggle, and death ===
On 31 March 1942, the nineteenth day of Japanese occupation of the Indies, a Japanese officer approached Mustafa in his prison cell in Ciamis, West Java, and promised to release him on condition that he would help the Japanese. After refusing, both he and Rukhiyat were sent back to Sukamanah.

During a ceremony at Sukamanah square, Mustafa and his followers refused to bow to honor the Japanese emperor, or saikeirei (最敬礼; lit. "most respectful bow") (usually misspelled as seikeirei in Indonesian history literature). As a result, his pesantren was kept under watch for 3 months. He was also accused by the Japanese government of being insane and perpetuating a cult. The Kempeitai soon attempted to assassinate Mustafa while he prayed, but missed and hit another devotee. In response to this and increasing instances of Japanese-ordered forced labour, Mustafa formed his own militia and began training for an armed struggle, which he planned to launch on 1 Maulud (25 February 1944).

The day before his attack, the Japanese sent an expeditionary force to invite Mustafa to hold negotiations. In response, Mustafa's troops killed all but one of the Japanese soldiers; the surviving soldier was ordered to return to his commander with an ultimatum requiring the sovereignty of Java. On 25 February 1944, the Japanese, totaling six companies of soldiers, two of heihos, one of raiders, and two motorized brigades, besieged Pesantren Sukamanah. Mustafa was arrested in Kampung Cihaus and taken to Batavia (modern day Jakarta), while 120 people died in the siege. After several months of torture Mustafa was executed on 25 October 1944, along with 17 of his followers, but his family only learned of his fate in 1970. His remains were claimed by his family and buried in Sukamanah, Tasikmalaya, on 10 January 1974.

== Legacy ==
Zainal Mustafa was awarded the title of National Hero of Indonesia title by President Suharto through Presidential Decree number 64 in 1972.

== Bibliography ==
- Ajisaka, Arya; Damayanti, Dewi (2010). Mengenal Pahlawan Indonesia [Knowing Indonesian Heroes] (in Indonesian). Jakarta: Kawan Pustaka. ISBN 978-979-757-430-7.
- Amin, Samsul Munir (2008). Karomah Para Kiai [Dignity of the Kyai] (in Indonesian). Yogyakarta: Pustaka Pesantren. ISBN 978-979-8452-49-9.
- Aritonang, Jan S. (2004). Sejarah Perjumpaan Kristen dan Islam di Indonesia [History of the Interactions Between Christianity and Islam in Indonesia] (in Indonesian). Jakarta: BPK Gunung Mulia. ISBN 978-979-687-221-3.
- Iskandar, Salman (2009). 99 Tokoh Muslim Indonesia [99 Indonesian Muslim Figures] (in Indonesian). Bandung: Dar! Mizan. ISBN 978-979-752-682-5.
- Moesa, Ali Maschan (2007). Nasionalisme Kiai: Konstruksi Sosial Berbasis Agama [Nationalism of the Kyai: Social Constructs Based on Religion]. Yogyakarta: LKiS. ISBN 978-979-1283-28-1.
- "Zainal Mustofa, KH". Encyclopedia of Jakarta (in Indonesian). Jakarta: Jakarta City Government. Archived from the original on 12 November 2012.
