= As'ad Syamsul Arifin =

Indonesian Islamic scholar, National Hero

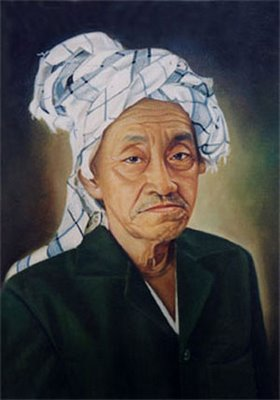
- As'ad Syamsul Arifin
- Born: Raden As'ad; 1897; Mecca, Hejaz, Ottoman Empire
- Died: 4 August 1990 (aged 92–93); Situbondo, East Java, Indonesia
- Occupation: Ulama
- Known for: Musytasar Nahdlatul Ulama

KHR. As’ad Syamsul Arifin (1897 – 4 August 1990) was an Indonesian ulama and co-founder of Nahdatul Ulama. In 2016, he was declared a National Hero of Indonesia.

== Biography ==
=== Early life ===
As'ad was born as Raden As'ad Syamsul Arifin in Syi'ib Ali, near Haram Mosque, Mecca, the oldest son of Raden Ibrahim and his wife Siti Maimunah. Kiai As'ad was of Wali Sanga’s descent from his father who was of a genealogical line from Sunan Kudus, and his mother who was of Sunan Ampel’s line.

At six old, his parent took him returned to Pondok Pesantren Kembang Kuning, Pamekasan, Madura. His brother, Abdurrahman, who was four years old, stayed with his mother’s cousin in Mecca. Five years later, As’ad and his father move to Asembagus, Situbondo in order to spread Islam in Java.

=== Education ===
Young As’ad studied and stayed in Pondok Pesantren Banyuanyar for three year (1910–1913). He continued his study at Madrasah as-Sawlatiyah.

== Founding Pesantren ==
At 1908, As’ad and his father, assisted by a number of santri cleared a land and built some buildings. It was located at Sumberejo, which was suggested by Habib Hasan Musawa dan Kiai Asadullah.

At 1951, As’ad was succeeded his father to lead the Pondok Pesantren Salafiyah Syafi'iyah. He expanded an educational system of the pesantren by adopting formal educational system both madrasah (which is regulated by Ministry of Religious Affair) and school (under Ministry of National Education).
