= Ilyas Yakoub =

Indonesian national hero

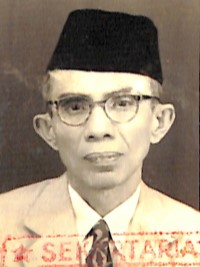
- Ilyas Yakoub
- Born: 14 June 1903; Asam Kumbang, North Sumatra, Dutch East Indies
- Died: 2 August 1958 (aged 55); Indonesia
- Occupations: Islamic scholar, journalist, politician
- Known for: Indonesian nationalist movement, exile to Boven-Digoel, National Hero of Indonesia
- Honors: National Hero of Indonesia (1999)

Ilyas Yakoub (14 June 1903 – 2 August 1958) sometimes spelled Ilyas Ya'kub, was an Indonesian Islamic scholar, journalist and politician. He was declared a National Hero of Indonesia in 1999.

== Biography ==
Ilyas Yakoub was born in Asam Kumbang, North Sumatra, Dutch East Indies (now Indonesia) on 14 June 1903. His father Haji Yakoub was a cloth merchant. Ilyas was sent to in a Hollandsch-Inlandsche School, a Dutch-language school for native children, and he also studied Islam with his grandfather. After graduating during the First World War, he worked as a clerk for a mining company in Sawahlunto until 1919. In 1923, he went to Egypt to study further; he became active in student and Islamic politics and began to write for Egyptian newspapers. He returned to the Indies in 1929.

In 1930 he cofounded the Persatuan Muslim Indonesia, a nationalist party with an Islamist orientation. Because of this he was exiled by the Dutch to the Boven-Digoel concentration camp.

He died on 2 August 1958. In 1958 he was declared a Pioneering Hero of Indonesian Independence and was declared a National Hero in 1999.
