= Raden Mattaher =

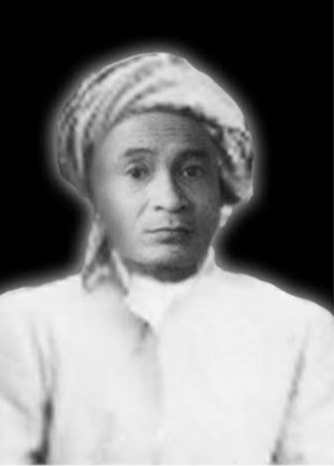
- Born: 1871; Sekamis, Jambi Sultanate
- Died: 10 September 1907 (aged 35–36); Muaro Jambi, Jambi Residency, Dutch East Indies
- Other names: Raden Mohammad Tahir, Pangeran Mattahir
- Known for: Indonesian Independence Fighter from Jambi, and Indonesian National Hero
- Parent(s): Raden Kusin (father); Ratumas Esa (mother)
- Relatives: Sultan Thaha Syaifuddin (grandfather)

Raden Mattaher, born Raden Mohammad Tahir, (born in Sekamis, Jambi Sultanate, 1871 - Muaro Jambi, Jambi Residency, 10 September 1907) was an Indonesian freedom fighter from Jambi. He has been recognised as an Indonesian National Hero.

== Early life ==
Mattaher was born in 1871 in Sekamis, Kasau Melintang Pauh, Air Hitam, Batin VI, Jambi and died in Muaro Jambi, 10 September 1907. His father was Prince Kusin who died in Makkah, while his mother was Ratumas Esa (Ratumas Tija) birth Mentawak Air Hitam Pauh, the district where the Temenggung Merah Mato came to power.

Mattaher's genealogy is Raden Mattaher bin Raden Kusin with the title of Prince Jayoningrat bin Prince Adi bin Raden Mochamad title Sultan Mochammad Fachruddin. He was the grandson of Sultan Thaha Syaifuddin another National Hero. Raden Mattaher's grandfather, Prince Adi, was the brother of Sultan Thaha Syaifuddin.

== Struggle ==
Sultan Thaha Syaifuddin a warlord who owned Sultan Thaha at that time. Using guerrilla tactics, Mattaher crushed the Dutch soldiers. He earned the title Singo Kumpeh. The nickname was given because of his ferocity.

Raden Mattaher served as a warlord. He formed pockets and lines of defense and resistance that moved in territory of Muara Tembesi up to Muaro Kumpeh. Mattaher focused on attacking Dutch warships that entered Jambi through the river. The Dutch warships were carrying personnel, medical drugs and ammunition.

Thanks to his tactics that focused on attacking ships loaded with army personnel and ammunition, Mattaher was feared by the Dutch army. In 1885 Thaha and Mattaher managed to sink a Dutch warship in the Kumpeh River Muaro Jambi which became a milestone known as Singo Kumpeh.

On September 10, 1907 Mattaher was shot dead in his home during a Dutch military operation. He was buried in the cemetery of the Kings of Jambi on the shores of Lake Sipin Jambi City. In addition, Mattaher's little finger was buried in a village in Muaro Jambi.

== Recognition ==
Mattaher's name adorns the Regional General Hospital (RSUD) Jambi Province alond with streets, a shooting range and a foundation in Jambi City.

On November 10, 2020, Mattaher was awarded the title of national hero of President Of The Republic Of Indonesia.
