= Kiras Bangun =

National Hero of Indonesia

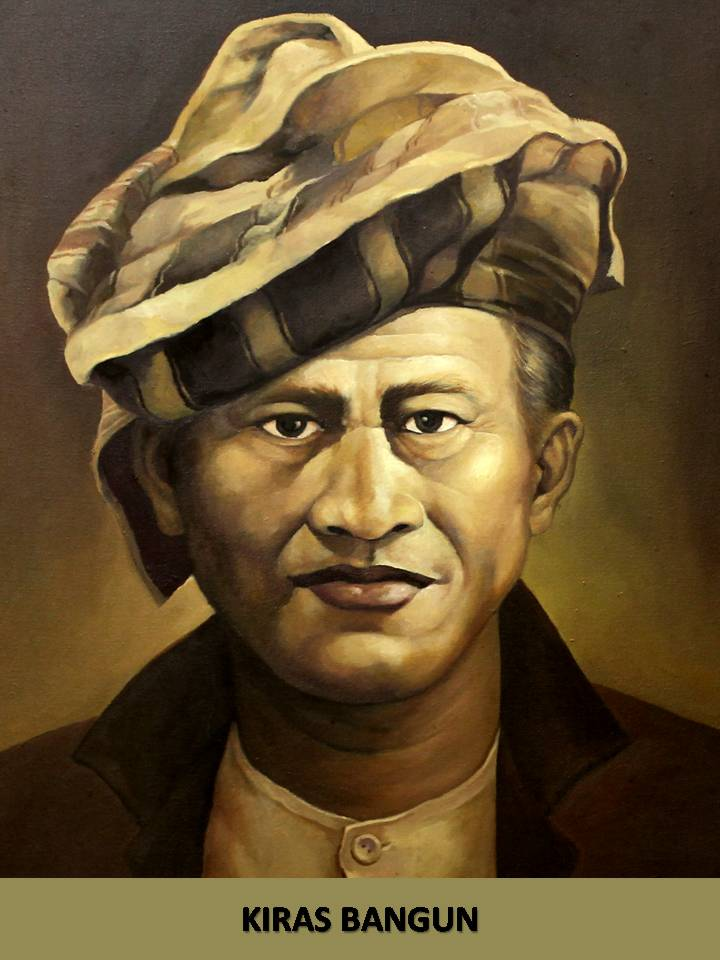
Sketch of Kiras Bangun Indonesian National Hero from North Sumatra by Ministry of Social Affairs Republic of Indonesia

Kiras Bangun (1852 – 22 October 1942), also known as Garamata, is a national hero of Indonesia.

== Biography ==
Bangun was born in the village of Batu Karang (modern day Karo Regency, North Sumatra), Dutch East Indies, in 1852. He was nicknamed Garamata (Red Eyes). As a youth, he wandered from urung (village) to urung in order to maintain the norms, customs and cultures of Karo.

In 1905, Bangun fought the Dutch in Southeast Aceh and Dairi with guerrilla tactics. However, the Dutch that used oportuniteit beginsel, forced him out of hiding and exiled him to Riung. He was released in 1909, although still under Dutch control. From 1919 to 1926, helped by two of his sons, he led the rebellion in Tanah Karo. They were exiled to Cipinang, whilst he continued his struggle against the Dutch.

Bangun died on 22 October 1942 in Batu Karang.

He was given the title Gelar Pahlawan Nasional Indonesia (National Hero of Indonesia) on 9 November 2005 by president Susilo Bambang Yudhoyono.

== Bibliography ==
- Sudarmanto, J.B. (2007). Jejak-Jejak Pahlawan: Perekat Kesatuan Bangsa Indonesia (in Indonesian). Grasindo. ISBN 978-979-759-716-0.
- Ajisaka, Arya (2008). Mengenal Pahlawan Indonesia (in Indonesian) (Revised ed.). Kawan Pustaka. ISBN 978-979-757-278-5.
