= Maskoen Soemadiredja =

Indonesian independence activist and politician

Maskun Sumadiredja (25 May 1907 – 4 January 1986) was an Indonesian independence activist and politician. He is now regarded as a National Hero of Indonesia, a title he was posthumously awarded in 2004.
