= Opu Daeng Risaju =

Indonesian independence activist

- Born: Famajjah; 1880; Palopo, Dutch East Indies
- Died: 10 February 1964 (aged 83–84)
- Other names: Opung Daeng Risadju, Opu Daeng Risadju
- Title: Opu Daeng Risaju
- Honours: National Hero of Indonesia

Opu Daeng Risaju (born Famajjah 1880 in Palopo, Dutch East Indies – died 10 February 1964) was an Indonesian independence activist. She was canonized as a National Hero of Indonesia in 2006.

== Biography ==
She was born to Muhammad Abdullah To Baresseng and Opu Daeng Mawellu in 1880, and at birth was named Famajjah. She was from a Buginese community in Luwu in South Sulawesi.^{:198} When she married H. Muhammad Daud, she assumed the Luwu royal title Opu Daeng Risaju, which is how she was known for the rest of her life. She was Muslim and wore hijab.^{:63}

Opu Daeng Risaju primarily fought against the Dutch colonization of what were, at the time, the Dutch East Indies. She became active in politics relative late in her life. She first became a member of the Indonesian Islamic Union Party (PSII) in 1927, around age forty-seven, in Parepare. She quickly became involved in the nationalist movement and rose through the PSII's organization.

In 1930, she established a local branch of PSII in Palopo.^{:198} She would serve as chairman. In 1933, she attended the Indonesian Islamic Union Congress in Batavia (now Jakarta).

Due to her political agitation and growing popularity, her peerage was revoked, and the Dutch government in Masamba arrested her and tried her for sedition. Beginning in 1934, she was imprisoned for fourteen months, sentenced to forced labor, and tortured.^{:64} After her release from prison and throughout the Japanese occupation, she continued to travel and establish branches of the PSII in South Sulawesi. She was arrested again after the Japanese surrender and transferred between various prisons, where she was tortured. This torture rendered her deaf for the remainder of her life and also damaged one of her eyes.^{:64}

In 1949, she moved to Pare-Pare to live with her son Abdul Kadir Daud. She died on 10 February 1964, at age eighty-four. She was buried in the cemetery of the rulers of Luwu in Lokkoe in Palopo.

In 2006, Opu Daeng Risaju was named a National Hero of Indonesia, one of the few women who have received the honor.
