= Sugiyono Mangunwiyoto =

Indonesian national hero

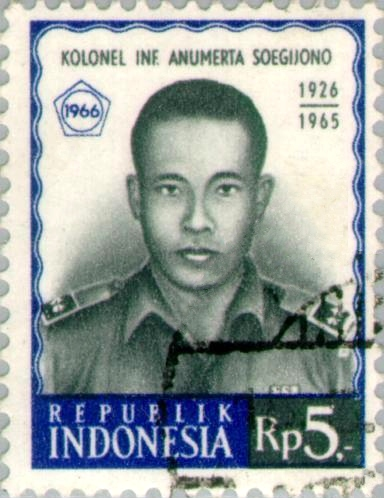
Sugiyono on a 1966 Indonesia stamp

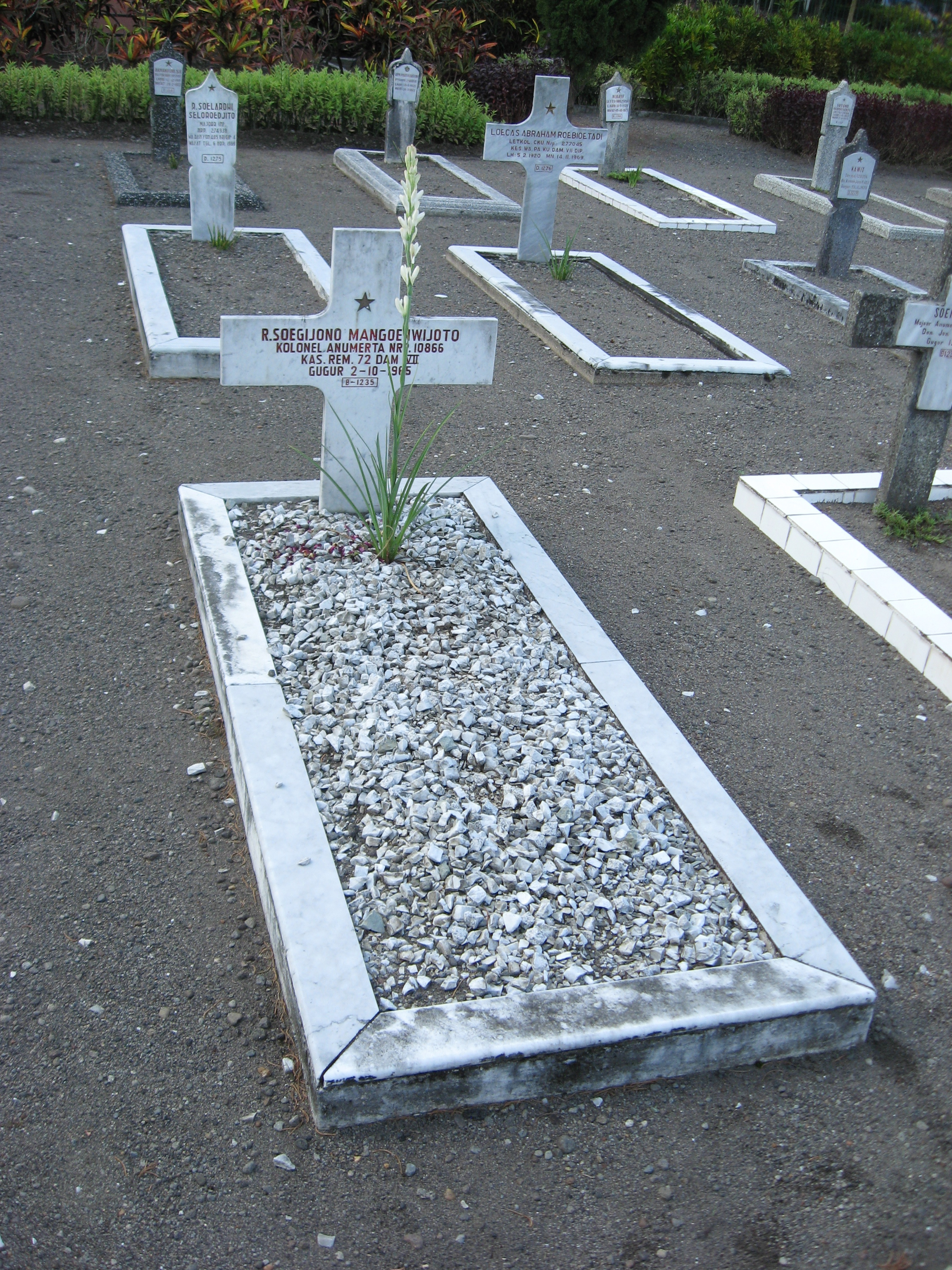
Mangunwiyoto's grave

Raden Sugiyono Mangunwiyoto (12 August 1926 – 1 October 1965) was one of 10 revolutionary heroes of Indonesia. He was kidnapped and killed by members of the 30 September Movement.

== Family ==
Mangunwiyoto married Supriyati and had 7 children, 6 sons and 1 daughter.

- R. Erry Guthomo (b. 1954)
- R. Agung Pramuji (b. 1956)
- R. Haryo Guritno (b. 1958)
- R. Danny Nugroho (b. 1960)
- R. Budi Winoto (b. 1962)
- R. Ganis Priyono (b. 1963)
- Rr. Sugiarti Takarina (b. 1965), she was born after the death of her father and her name was given by President Sukarno
