= La Maddukelleng =

National Hero of Indonesia

La Maddukelleng (c. 1700–1765) was a Buginese adventurer who served as supreme leader of Wajo in the second quarter of the 18th century. La Maddukelleng is now regarded as a National Hero of Indonesia.
