= Balanipa =

Coordinates: 3.4782973°S 119.0576298°E

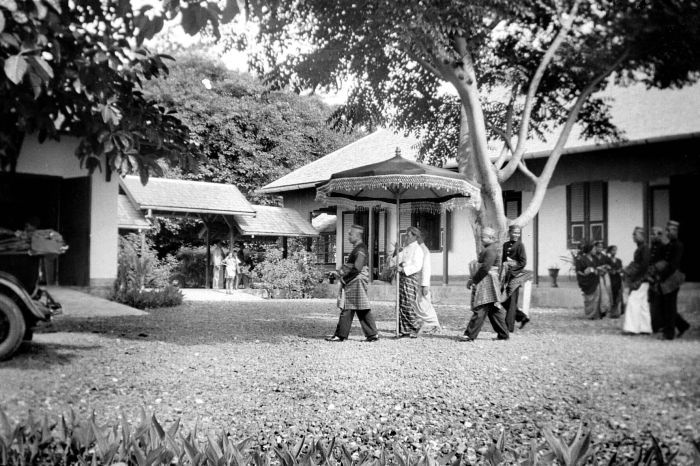
The prince of Balanipa leaves after a meeting with the assistent-resident of Mamuju (1938)

Balanipa is a subdistrict (Indonesian: kecamatan) of the Polewali Mandar regency, in West Sulawesi, Indonesia.

The sub-district had an estimated population of 26,140 as of 2019.
