= Djambi Residency =

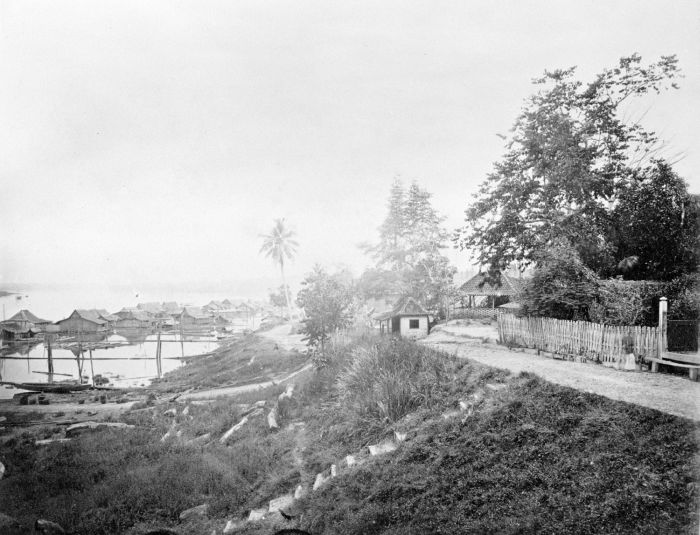
Batang Hari River photographed during the 1877-79 Sumatra Expedition

Djambi Residency (Dutch: Residentie Djambi) was an administrative territorial entity of the Dutch East Indies and was established in 1906.

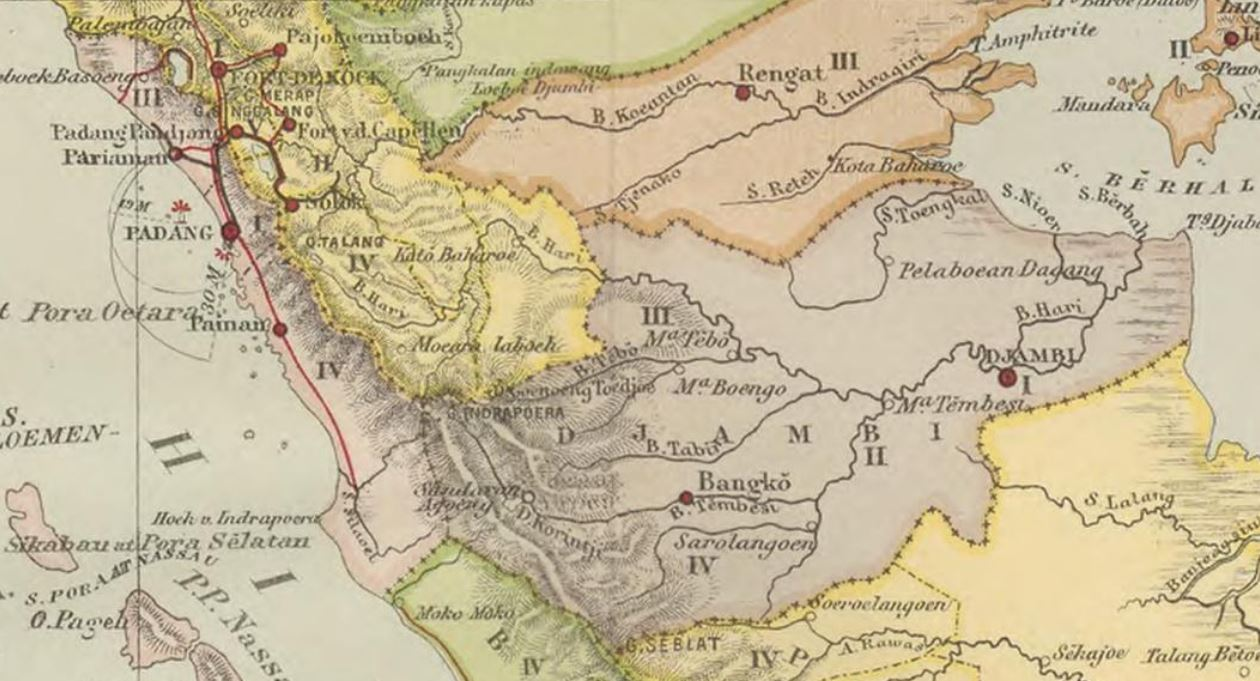
1909 Malay-language Map of Djambi Residency

== List of residents ==
Dutch Colonial Era
No.	Name	Took office	Left office
1.	O.L. Helfrich	1906	1908
2.	A.J.N. Engelenberg	1908	1910
3.	Th. A.L. Heyting	1910	1913
4.	AL. Kamerling	1913	1915
5.	H.E.C. Quast	1915	1918
6.	H.L.C Petri	1918	1923
7.	C. Poortman	1923	1925
8.	G.J. Van Dongen	1925	1927
9.	H.E.K Ezerman	1927	1928
10.	J.R.F Verschoor Van Niesse	1928	1931
11.	W.S. Teinbuch	1931	1933
12.	Ph. J. Van der Meulen	1933	1936
13.	M.J. Ruyschaver	1936	1940
14.	Reuvers	1940	1942
Indonesian Independence Era
No.	Name	Took office	Left office
15.	Segaf Yahya	1945	1945
16.	R. Inu Kertapati	1945	1950
17.	Bachsan	1950	1953
18.	Hoesin Puang Limbaro	1953	1954
19.	R. Sudono	1954	1955
20.	Djamin Datuk Bagindo	1955	1957

== See also ==
- Jambi
