= Andi Sultan Daeng Radja =

Indonesian politician

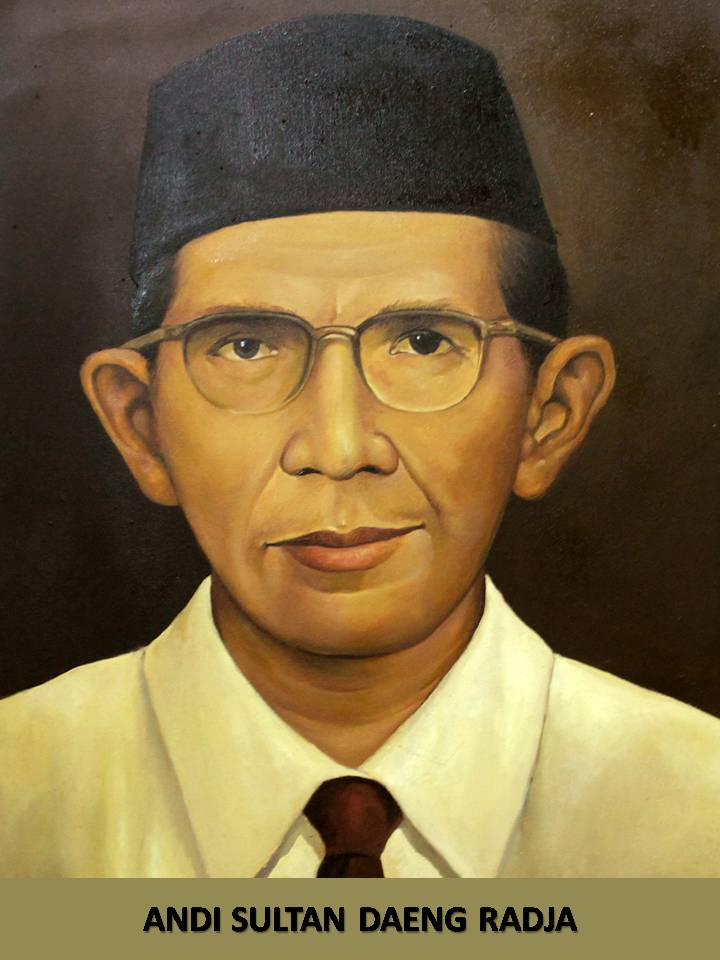
Andi Sultan Daeng Raja

Andi Sultan Daeng Radja (1894–1963) was an Indonesian politician, who is now regarded as a National Hero of Indonesia.
