= Andi Mappanyukki =

Indonesian national hero

32nd King of Bone

Personal details
- Born: 1885
- Died: 18 April 1967 (aged 81–82)
- Children: Andi Abdullah Bau Massepe
- Awards: National Hero of Indonesia

Military service
- Branch/service: Royal Army of Gowa

Andi Mappanyukki, also spelt as Andi Mappanjukki, (1885 – 18 April 1967), was the 32nd King of Bone and an Indonesian rebel who fought against the Dutch from the 1920s to the 1930s. A National Hero of Indonesia, he was the father of Andi Abdullah Bau Massepe. He was a scion of both the houses of Gowa and Bone.

Born the son of I Makkulau Daeng Serang Karaeng Lembangparang, Sultan of Gowa, his father appointed him Lieutenant of the Royal Army of Gowa in 1905 after a rebellion against the Dutch broke out. When his father died, he continued with guerrilla warfare. In 1931, he was appointed ruler of Bone after a 26-year interregnum.

Dying on 18 April 1967, in Jongaya, he was buried at Panaikang Ujung Pandang with state honours, and later on 10 November 2004 declared a National Hero of Indonesia by Presidential Decree No. 089 / TK / TH 2004.
