= Andi Djemma =

National Hero of Indonesia

Andi Djemma (15 January 1901 – 23 February 1965) was a king of Luwu in South Sulawesi and Indonesian nationalist who later supported inclusion of his own kingdom to the newly formed Indonesian Republic.

== Early life ==
Djemma was born in Palopo, 15 January 1901 from the Luwu royal family. He attended Inlandsche School, a native Indonesian school in Luwu for five years, then continued his education informally, educated by his own family inside the royal court. He was frequently invited to attend meetings between colonial officials and royal administrative officials by his mother, where he would develop his political thoughts and interest in Indonesian nationalism. Djemma became a district official in 1919 and was placed in several districts in South Sulawesi such as Ngapa and Ware. However, he was fired from his position in 1931 for his alleged connections and secretly funding Indonesian nationalist organization in the region.

He was nominated as one of the successors for king of Luwu following his father's death. Among twelve candidates, three left after consideration by royal council. Dutch government was worried at Andi's rise to the position, but despite that, he was chosen since Andi's supporters threatened to start a conflict if he was not elected.

== National Revolution ==
After the Japanese occupation of the Dutch East Indies and the Proclamation of Indonesian Independence, he contacted Sam Ratulangi, then-governor of newly formed Sulawesi province to discuss the Indonesian Republic position and decided to support the republic establishment. He later formed a paramilitary organization named Soekarno Moeda (lit: Young Sukarno). He negotiated and convinced other traditional rulers in the region to support Indonesian Republic and reject any cooperation with Netherlands Indies Civil Administration. His paramilitary would later be under his own son, Andi Makkalau, and attacked several Japanese positions to steal their weapons.

On 21 January 1946, Andi sent an ultimatum to all Dutch officials to leave the Luwu region in 48 hours after an incident involving the destruction of a mosque by the Royal Netherlands East Indies Army, or else all Dutch officials would be massacred. This ultimatum was ignored and a widespread attack started on 23 January 1946 involving the Royal Netherlands East Inies Army and also the Australian army who were also attacked by militias. This would be followed by the South Sulawesi campaign of 1946–1947, and Andi would be arrested by the Dutch on 3 July 1946 and exiled to Ternate. He was sentenced to death but reduced to 25 years imprisonment and soon released after the Dutch–Indonesian Round Table Conference.

He stayed on in his position as king of Luwu and a civil servant until he died on 23 February 1965.

== Awards and legacy ==
He was awarded Satyalacana Karya in 1964. In 2002, he was posthumously awarded the title National Heroes of Indonesia. A street in Makassar was named after him, a university in Palopo, and also Andi Jemma Airport.
