= Katamso Darmokusumo =

Indonesian general

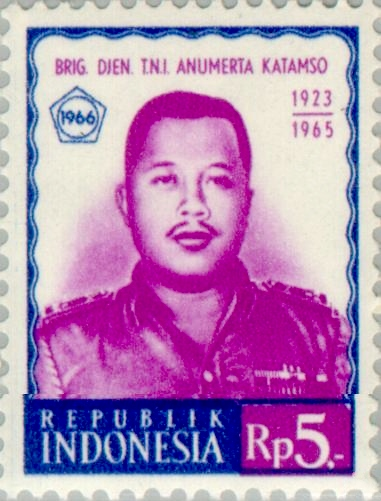
Katamso Darmokusumo on a 1966 Indonesia stamp

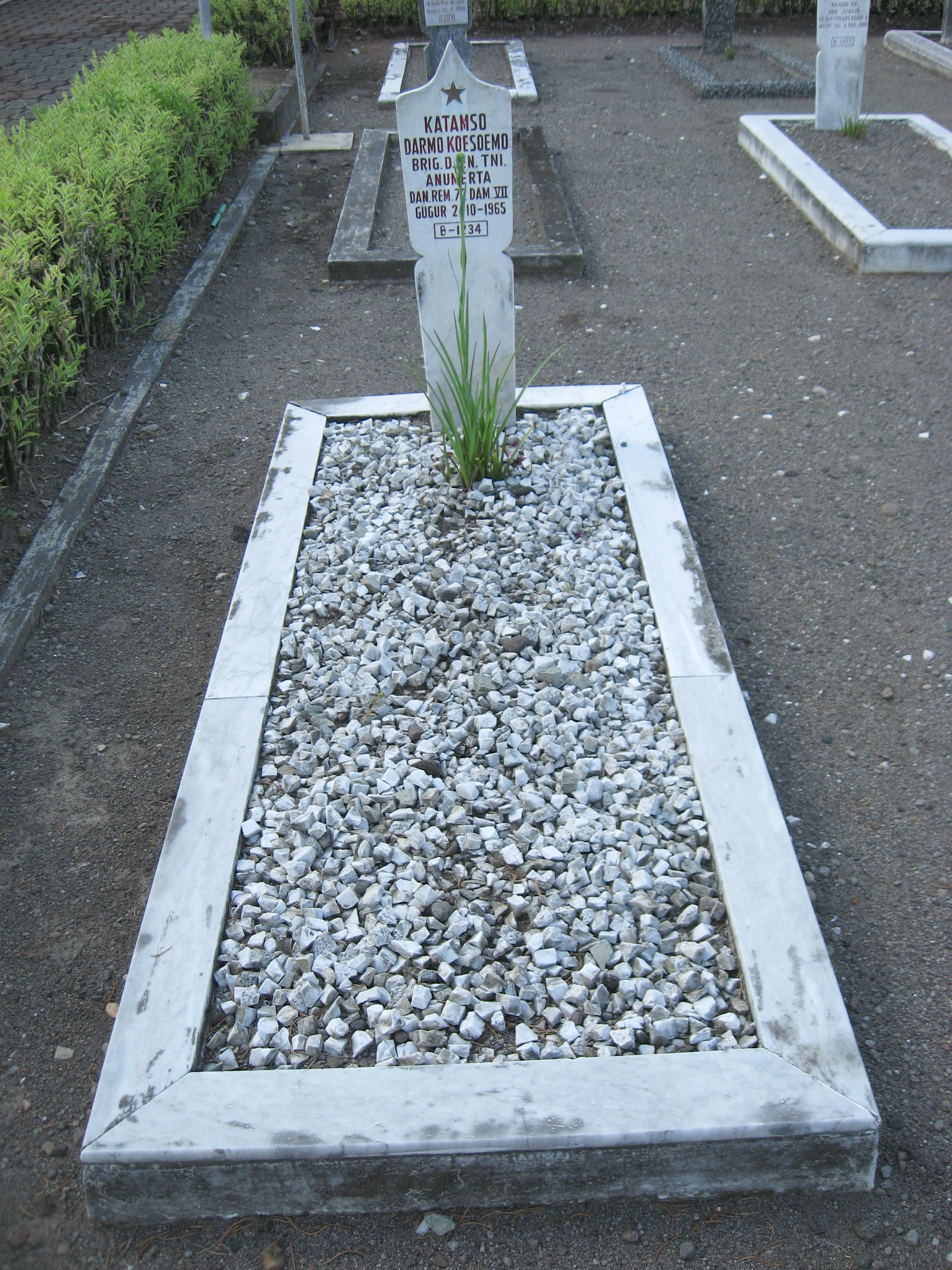
Darmokusumo's grave

Katamso Darmokusumo (5 February 1923 – 1 October 1965) was the commander of Military District (Korem) 072 in the Diponegoro Area Military command of the Indonesian Army in Central Java. He was kidnapped on 1 October 1965 and killed later the same day by members of the 30 September Movement. He was declared one of Indonesia's national heroes.
