= Amoroso Katamsi =

Indonesian actor (1938–2018)

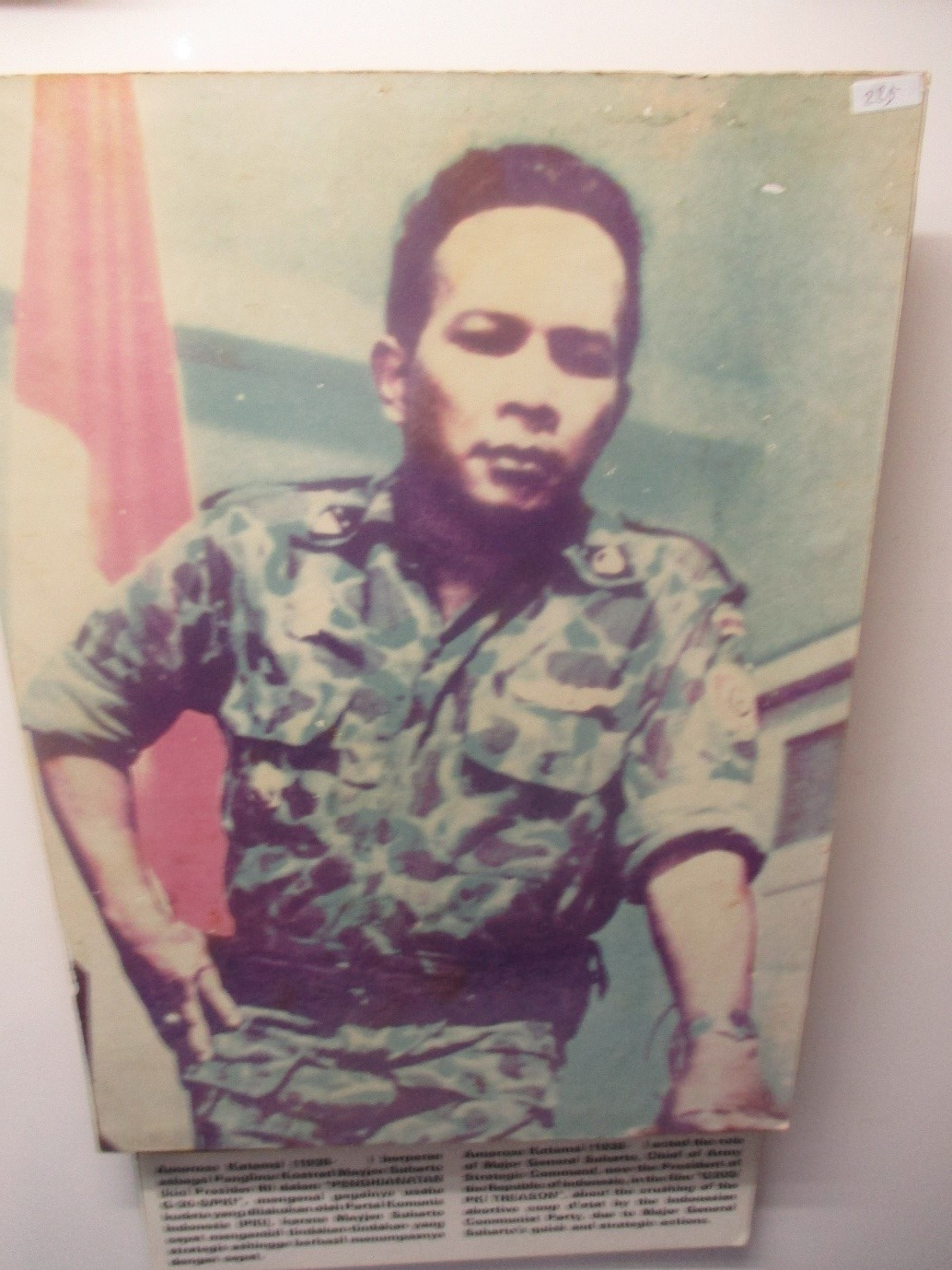
- Amoroso Katamsi when acting as Lieutenant Colonel. Suharto in the film Penumpasan Pengkhianatan G 30 S PKI.
- Born: 21 October 1940; Batavia, Dutch East Indies
- Died: 17 April 2018 (aged 79); Jakarta, Indonesia
- Occupations: Singer, performer
- Years active: 1976–2018
- Spouse: Pranawengrum Katamsi
- Children: Ratna Arumasari Katamsi (1965); Doddy Keswara Kartikajaya/Doddy Katamsi (10 Juni 1967); Ratna Kusumaningrum Katamsi/Aning Katamsi (3 Juni 1969)

Amoroso Katamsi (21 October 1938 – 17 April 2018) was an Indonesian actor and artist. He is well known by Penumpasan Pengkhianatan G 30 S PKI created in 1982 by director, Arifin C. Noer and by Djakarta 1966 supported by Umar Kayam with same director. He became chief of PARFI.

== Filmography ==
Movies

- "Cinta Abadi" (1976) starred by Erna Santoso
- "Menanti Kelahiran" (1976) starred by Vonny Pawaka
- "Cinta Putih" (1977) starred by Yati Octavia
- "Terminal Cinta" (1977) starred by W.S. Rendra
- "Serangan Fajar" (1981)
- "Djakarta 1966" (1982)
- "Pasukan Berani Mati" (1982)
- "Perkawinan 83" (1982)
- "Penumpasan Pengkhianatan G 30 S PKI" (1984)
- "Bila Saatnya Tiba" (1985)
- "Bisikan Setan" (1985)
- "Pergaulan" (1994)
- "Dibalik 98"(2015)

Soap operas

- Hidayah (2005)
- Di Atas Sajadah Cinta (2006)
- Hingga Akhir Waktu (2008)
- Anak Durhaka (MNCTV)
- Tukang Bubur Naik Haji (2013)
