= Pengkhianatan G30S/PKI =

1984 Indonesian propaganda film directed by Arifin C. Noer

- Lobby card
- Directed by: Arifin C. Noer
- Written by: Arifin C. Noer; Nugroho Notosusanto
- Based on: The Coup Attempt of the 30 September Movement in Indonesia by Nugroho Notosusanto and Ismail Saleh
- Produced by: G. Dwipayana
- Starring: Amoroso Katamsi as Suharto; Umar Kayam as Sukarno; Syubah Asa as DN Aidit
- Cinematography: Hasan Basri
- Edited by: Supandi
- Music by: Embie C. Noer
- Production company: Perum Produksi Film Negara
- Release date: September 30, 1984
- Running time: 220 minutes
- Country: Indonesia
- Language: Indonesian
- Budget: Rp. 800 million

Pengkhianatan G30S/PKI (Note: Also written Pengkhianatan G 30 S/PKI and Pengkhianatan G-30-S/PKI; also known as Penumpasan Pengkhianatan G30S/PKI, Indonesian for Eradication of the Treachery of G30S/PKI.) ([pəŋxiaˈnatan ˈɡe ˈtiɡa ˈpulʊh ˈɛs ˈpe ˈka ˈi]; Indonesian for Treachery of G30S/PKI) is a 1984 Indonesian docudrama co-written and directed by Arifin C. Noer, produced by G. Dwipayana, and starring Amoroso Katamsi, Umar Kayam, and Syubah Asa. Produced over a period of two years with a budget of Rp. 800 million, the film was sponsored by Suharto's New Order government. It was based on an official history of the 30 September Movement (Gerakan 30 September, or G30S) coup in 1965 written by Nugroho Notosusanto and Ismail Saleh, which depicted the coup as being orchestrated by the Communist Party of Indonesia (Partai Komunis Indonesia, or PKI).

The film depicts the period leading up to the coup and several days after it. In a time of economic turmoil, six generals are kidnapped and killed by the PKI and Air Force, purportedly to pre-empt a coup against President Sukarno. General Suharto destroys the coup and, afterwards urges the Indonesian populace to commemorate those killed and fight against all forms of communism. The film shows the G30S leadership as ruthless and planning "every move to the last detail", taking joy in using excessive violence and torturing the generals, depictions which have been read as portraying "the state's enemies as outside the realm of the human".

The first commercially released domestic feature film to deal with the events of 1965, Pengkhianatan G30S/PKI was a commercial and critical success. It was nominated for seven awards at the 1984 Indonesian Film Festival, winning one, and reached record viewership numbers – although in many cases audiences were required to see the film. The film was used as a propaganda vehicle by the New Order government until its collapse; televised annually on 30 September and became mandatory viewing for students. Since the fall of Suharto in 1998, such use of the film has become less common. Although the film's artistic aspects remain well-received, its misrepresentation of history has been criticised.

== Background ==
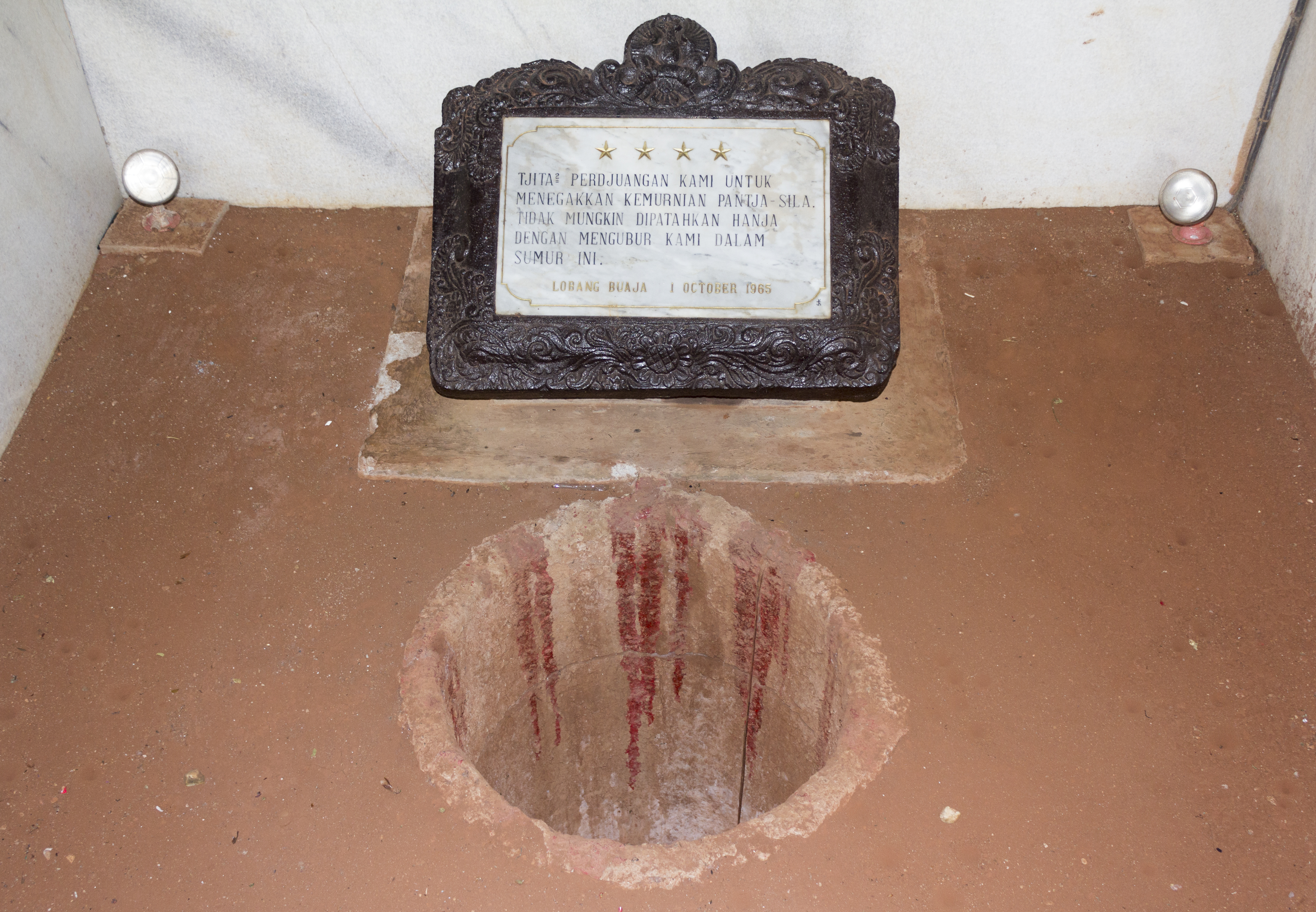
The well down which the generals' bodies were dumped, 2013

Pengkhianatan G30S/PKI was based on the version of the story endorsed by Suharto's New Order government, in which the 30 September Movement (Gerakan 30 September, or G30S) coup was allegedly orchestrated by the Communist Party of Indonesia (Partai Komunis Indonesia, or PKI). (Note: Several alternative theories have been put forward. McGlynn & Sulistyo (2007, pp. 6–8), for example, record four theories which, respectively, render the coup as an internal Army affair, or masterminded by Sukarno, Suharto, or Indonesian intelligence.) In the early 1960s the PKI and other leftist parties had the support of President Sukarno, giving them great political power. By 1965 the PKI claimed millions of members, a growing number influenced by hyperinflation and widespread poverty. The Army, however, was distrustful of the PKI, a feeling which the PKI reciprocated.

On the night of 30 September–1 October 1965, a group of Indonesian National Armed Forces members calling themselves the 30 September Movement captured and killed six Army generals thought to belong to an anti-revolutionary "Generals' Council", including Commander of the Army Ahmad Yani; another target, Abdul Haris Nasution, escaped. The bodies, along with those of others captured by the G30S, were dumped down a well at Lubang Buaya, Jakarta.

Later that morning, armed forces occupied Merdeka Square in central Jakarta. From the Radio Republik Indonesia (RRI) office there, Lieutenant-Colonel Untung Syamsuri of the Presidential Guard announced that the movement had secured several key locations in the city in an attempt to forestall a coup by the Generals' Council. They also announced that President Sukarno was under their power. The movement's core leadership, later joined by the President, stayed at Halim Perdanakusuma Air Force Base.

Major-General Suharto, the interim leader after Yani's death, became aware of the movement on the morning of 1 October. By evening he had convinced a G30S battalion in Merdeka Square and those occupying the RRI building to surrender, without any bloodshed. Army loyalists under Suharto retook Halim Air Force Base early the following morning. By that time the G30S leadership had escaped, while Sukarno had withdrawn to his palace in Bogor. In the years that followed, the Indonesian Army and general populace undertook a campaign of retribution, killing or capturing registered and suspected PKI members – including most of the G30S leadership. (Note: Most estimates put the total at 500,000 dead, though numbers vary and the actual total may never be known (Ricklefs 1993, pp. 288–290).)

== Plot ==
Indonesia is in turmoil. The populace lives in poverty, while the rich flaunt their wealth. President Sukarno is ill and may die. Meanwhile, his political concept of Nasakom (nationalism, religion, and communism) has promoted an explosive growth in the PKI. The party, which staged a coup in 1948, has been attacking and killing people throughout the country. The weakened president is also being manipulated by the party. The PKI has manufactured a story, based on the forged Gilchrist Document, that a Generals' Council is preparing for a coup should Sukarno die. D. N. Aidit, Syam, and the PKI leadership secretly plan to use this as an excuse for their own coup. The rank and file members of the Party accept the leadership's explanation and, with the help of "forward-thinking" soldiers and officers (mostly from the Air Force), work to gather the Party's forces. They plan to kidnap seven generals (said to be members of the Generals' Council), overtake the city, and secure Sukarno. The newly named G30S begins training. The rightist members of the Army are unaware of this upcoming coup, living happily with their families. By the time they realise that something is amiss, it is too late.

On the night of 30 September – 1 October, seven units are sent to kidnap the generals associated with the Council. General A. H. Nasution manages to escape over a wall, while his Aide-de-camp, Pierre Tendean comes running out; he is quickly captured and confesses himself to be the general. Yani, who fights back, and Major General M. T. Haryono are killed in their homes. Chief Military Prosecutor Sutoyo Siswomiharjo, Major General Siswondo Parman, and Lieutenant General Soeprapto are captured. Brigadier General D. I. Pandjaitan goes willingly, but when he prays for too long before entering the truck he is killed. The bodies and prisoners are taken to the G30S/PKI camp in Lubang Buaya, where the survivors are tortured and killed. Their bodies are then thrown into a well. Later that morning, members of the movement take over the state radio office and force the staff to read a speech by Untung, declaring that the G30S has moved to forestall a coup by the Generals' Council and announces the formation of a "Revolutionary Council". Suharto leaves Merdeka Palace for Halim Air Base, where he tells the G30S leaders that he will take full control of the Army. Another radio speech outlines the composition of the new Revolutionary Council and announces changes to Army hierarchy. The G30S leaders aim to escape from Halim before midnight.

Suharto, awoken early in the morning, denies Untung's announcement, stating explicitly that there is no Generals' Council and making an adjunct record notes on the true nature of G30S. As there is a power vacuum with Yani dead, Suharto takes temporary control of the Army and plans a counter-assault with his men, but is unwilling to force a fight. He instead gives a radio announcement; delivered after forces loyal to him retake the office; it outlines the situation, describes G30S as counter-revolutionary, and states that the Army will deal with the coup. The G30S leaders flee Halim, and Suharto's troops retake the air base. Some time later, forces under Suharto's leadership attack a G30S/PKI headquarters. While PKI-affiliated soldiers fight, the Party leadership escapes and separates, planning to continue their struggle underground.

Suharto is soon called to the secondary Bogor Palace to speak with Sukarno. There, the president says that he has received assurances from Air Marshal Omar Dani that the Air Force was not involved. Suharto refutes the statement, noting that the movement's arms were like those of the Air Force. The meeting eventually results in Suharto being confirmed as leader of the Army, working with Pranoto Reksosamodra. The Army discovers the camp at Lubang Buaya and the generals' bodies, which are recovered while Suharto delivers a speech describing the coup and the PKI's role in it. The generals are interred elsewhere. In a eulogy, Suharto condemns the G30S/PKI and urges the Indonesian people to continue the fallen generals' struggle.

== Cast ==
- Syu'bah Asa as DN Aidit
- Umar Kayam as Sukarno
- Amoroso Katamsi as Suharto
- Didi Sadikin as Sarwo Edhie Wibowo
- Bram Adrianto as Untung Syamsuri
- Pramana Padmodarmaya as Ahmad Yani
- Rudy Sukma as Abdul Haris Nasution
- Ade Irawan as Johanna Sunarti
- Henneke Adinda Tumbuan as Ade Irma Suryani Nasution
- Wawan Wanisar as Pierre Tendean

== Production ==
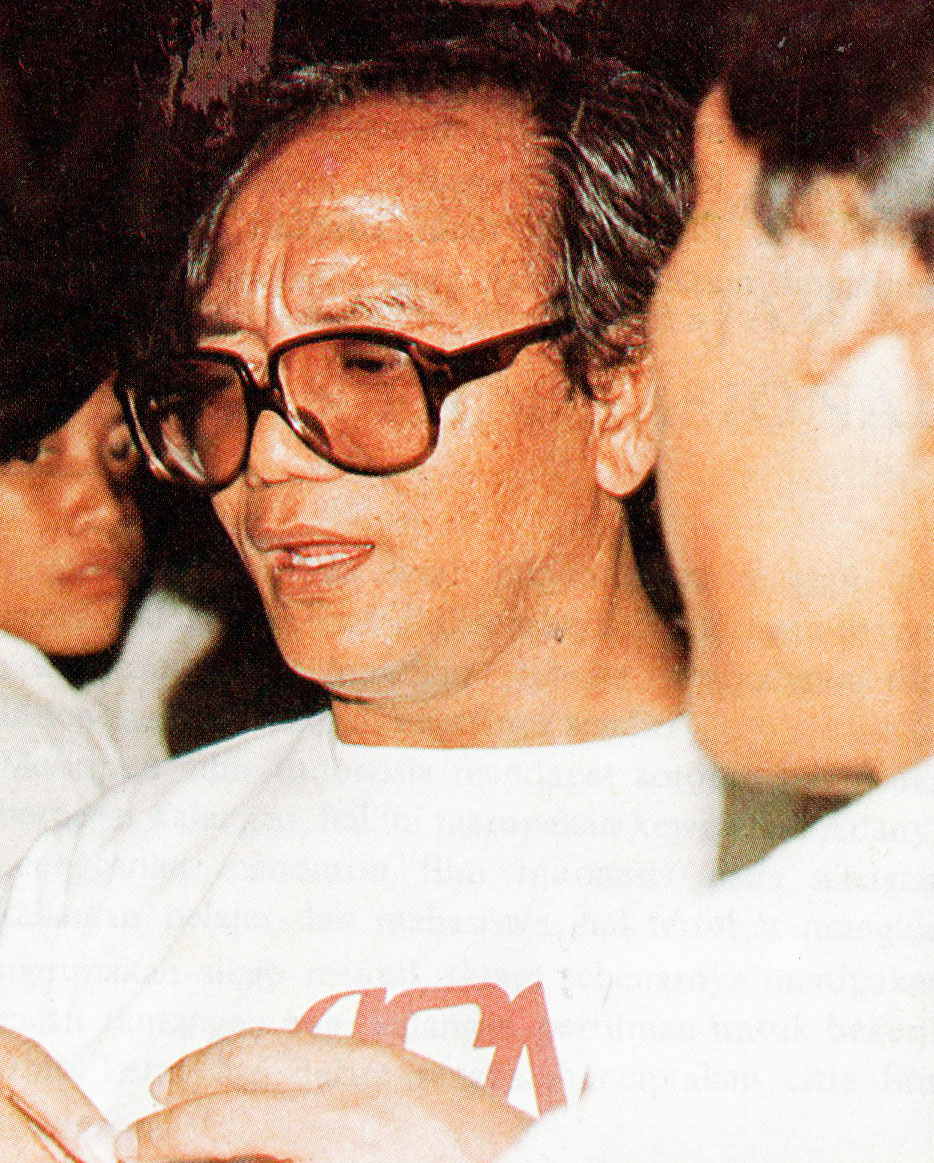
The film was directed by Arifin C. Noer.

Pengkhianatan G30S/PKI was directed by Arifin C. Noer, a Citra Award-winning director with a background in theatre. He had previous experience in the genre, having made the war film Serangan Fajar (Dawn Attack; 1981), which emphasised Suharto's role in the National Revolution. Noer was assigned to work on the film by the state-owned National Film Production Company (Perum Produksi Film Negara, or PPFN), which maintained a degree of control over the production. Professors of Indonesian culture Krishna Sen and David T. Hill suggest that Noer's creative input was minimal. Instead, "for all intents and purposes" the film was the work of its producer, Brigadier-General Gufran Dwipayana, then the head of PPFN and a member of the presidential staff. However, Noer's wife Jajang C. Noer insists that he had remained independent while making the film.

The screenplay for Pengkhianatan G30S/PKI was based on a 1968 book by the military historian Nugroho Notosusanto and the investigator Ismail Saleh entitled The Coup Attempt of the 30 September Movement in Indonesia. The book, which was meant to counter foreign theories about the coup, detailed the 30 September Movement as the government viewed it. Only Notosusanto, the higher-ranking of the two authors, was credited for his contribution. In adapting the book Noer read much of the available literature (including court documents) and interviewed numerous eyewitnesses; Jajang, in a 1998 interview, said that her husband had not only read the official government version, but also the controversial Cornell Paper, which portrayed the coup as entirely an internal Army affair. During filming the crew emphasised realism, "paying great attention to detail" and using the generals' actual homes.

Owing to the large number of roles – including some 100 bit parts and more than 10,000 extras – casting for Pengkhianatan G30S/PKI was difficult. Noer attempted to cast actors who resembled the historical figures depicted; Rano Karno later recalled that he was rejected for the role of Pierre Tendean as the latter did not have a mole on his face. Ultimately the film starred Bram Adrianto as Untung, Amoroso Katamsi as Suharto, Umar Kayam as Sukarno, and Syubah Asa as Aidit; other actors included Ade Irawan, Sofia W.D., Dani Marsuni, and Charlie Sahetapy. Kayam, then a lecturer at Gadjah Mada University in Yogyakarta, did not have the time to research Sukarno's mannerisms from his books and speeches; instead, he portrayed the president based on testimonials from the staff at the Bogor palace. Katamsi, on the other hand, studied Suharto's role from books and, by the time filming had commenced, felt as if "was Pak Harto, not an imitation of Pak Harto." (Note: Original: "... sebagai Pak Harto, bukan imitasi Pak Harto." Pak is an honorific which literally translates as "father", but can also mean "mister".) Sanusi, meanwhile, considered his own performance underwhelming.

Production of Pengkhianatan G30S/PKI, originally titled Sejarah Orde Baru (History of the New Order), took nearly two years, spending four months in pre-production and a year and half in filming. It cost Rp. 800 million, (Note: Roughly equivalent to US$1,000,000 in March 1984. When Pengkhianatan G30S/PKI was produced the rupiah was on a managed float but depreciating; in March 1983 the value was Rp. 970 to the US$, but by September 1986 it was Rp. 1,664 to the US$ (CUHK 2000, Historical Exchange Rate).) receiving funding from the government. Cinematography was handled by Hasan Basri, with music by Arifin's brother Embie C. Noer. Editing was done by Supandi. Parts of the film, particularly the final ten minutes, reused archival footage and newspaper clippings contemporaneous to the events.

== Themes ==
Pengkhianatan G30S/PKI portrays the PKI and communism as inherently evil, with its followers "beyond redemption", while the G30S leadership are seen as cunning and ruthless, plotting "every move to the last detail". The historian Katherine McGregor finds this emphasised in the film's portrayal of the G30S leadership as gangsters, sitting in secret meetings amidst clouds of cigarette smoke. She considers an opening scene, where the PKI attacks an Islamic school, as likewise meant to show the "evil" nature of communists.

The PKI are portrayed as enjoying violence, with the film heavily featuring "eye-gouging women and decomposed, tortured bodies". The generals are kidnapped, and in several cases killed, in front of their families; later the captured generals are tortured while the communists dance around a bonfire. The sociologist Adrian Vickers suggests that the film's violence was meant to portray "the state's enemies as outside the realm of the human", similar to monsters in horror films. (Note: This, Vickers (2012, pp. 63–64) suggests, links the "individual horror" in horror films to wider social issues like communism.) Yoseph Yapi Taum of Sanata Dharma University notes that members of the leftist women's movement Gerwani are shown as part of a "crazy" Communist Party, dancing in the nude and cutting off the general's penises. However, Vickers considers these portrayals as ambiguous, suggesting that the New Order government was allowed a monopoly on violence. McGregor suggests that the violence in once-tranquil homes shows the "'destruction' of the family". Sen notes the violence belies a "representation of chaos before order" which is common in New Order films.

== Release ==
Before its commercial release, Pengkhianatan G30S/PKI was pre-screened in August 1984 for high-ranking military officers who had been involved in stopping the coup, including Suharto and Sarwo Edhie Wibowo. The film was released on 30 September 1984, the first commercially released domestic feature film to deal with the events of 1965. (Note: Sen (1994, p. 81), quoted in Heryanto (2006, pp. 198–199), records an earlier domestic production regarding the G30S coup entitled Operasi (Operation; 1968), but it never saw commercial release.) It was seen by 699,282 people in Jakarta by the end of 1984, a national record which remained unbroken for over a decade. (Note: At the time, any film with more than 200,000 viewers was considered a "top box office" hit ("sangat laris"); seven films produced in 1984 reached this benchmark (Kompas 1984, 'Pengkhianatan G30S/PKI').) However, not all audiences attended of their own volition. The Indonesian sociologist Ariel Heryanto records students as being "required to pay" to see the film during school hours, a fact not reflected in contemporary records. A novelisation by popular writer Arswendo Atmowiloto likewise helped promote the film.

Dwipayana's influence ensured that contemporary reviews, especially synopses, repeated the government's position on the G30S coup. This is not to say all reviews were positive. Marselli of Kompas, for instance, found that Pengkhianatan G30S/PKI was highly detailed, with extensive work and quality acting going to represent events accurately. He felt, however, that the film felt too long and, as viewers knew instantly who the good and bad characters were, it became "nothing but a black-and-white portrait without any complex issues", which ignored the underlying problems which had sparked the G30S movement. (Note: Original: "... hanyalah lukisan hitam-putih tanpa persoalan kompleks.")

Suharto, after viewing an early screening, stated that the story was unfinished and suggested that a sequel was necessary. Two sequels by PPFN, Operasi Trisula (Operation Trisula; 1987) and Djakarta 1966 (Jakarta 1966; 1988), followed. Operasi Trisula, directed by BZ Kadaryono, dealt with the extermination of G30S and PKI members in Blitar, East Java. Djakarta 1966, meanwhile, was directed by Noer and showed the lead-up to the signing of Supersemar on 11 March 1966, in which Sukarno gave Suharto authority to take whatever measures he "deemed necessary"; Kayam and Katamsi reprised their roles for the latter film, which won seven awards at the 1989 Bandung Film Festival.

== Accolades ==
Pengkhianatan G30S/PKI received seven nominations at the 1984 Indonesian Film Festival (Festival Film Indonesia, or FFI), including a Citra Award for Best Film, winning one Citra Award for Best Screenplay. It was beaten in four categories: for Best Director, Best Cinematography, Best Leading Actor (Katamsi), and Best Musical Direction, by Sjumandjaja's Budak Nafsu (Slave to Passion), while Slamet Rahardjo's Ponirah Terpidana (Ponirah Convicted) took Best Artistic Direction. For the latter category, the nomination's recipient was Farraz Effendy. At the 1985 FFI Pengkhianatan G30S/PKI received an Antemas Award as the best-selling film of the preceding calendar year. The film scholar Thomas Barker suggests that the film's awards were, in part, a conjunction of state and FFI interests: both were focused on promoting a united national culture.

== Propaganda use ==
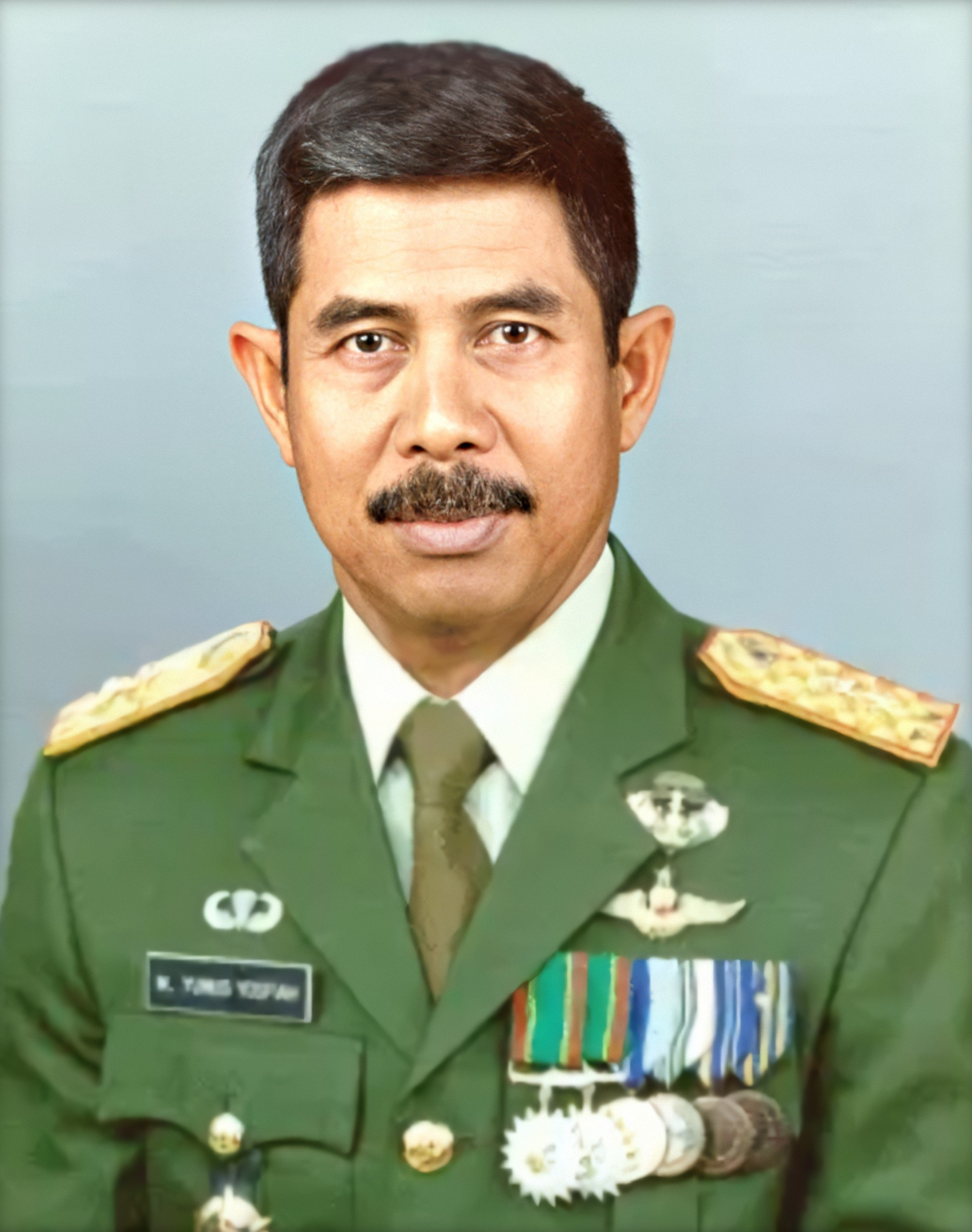
In September 1998, the Information Minister Yunus Yosfiah (pictured in 1993) described the film as an attempt to create a cult around Suharto

Beginning in 1984 the New Order government used Pengkhianatan G30S/PKI as a propaganda vehicle, showing it annually on 30 September. The film was broadcast by the state-owned network TVRI, and later on private television stations after they were established. It was also shown at schools and government institutions; students would be taken to open fields to view the film in a group. Because of this use, Sen and Hill suggest that Pengkhianatan G30S/PKI is the most-broadcast and most-watched Indonesian film of all time. A 2000 survey by the Indonesian magazine Tempo found 97 percent of the 1,101 students surveyed had seen the film; 87 percent of them had seen it more than once.

During the remainder of the 1980s and early 1990s the historical accuracy of Pengkhianatan G30S/PKI was little disputed, and the film became representative of canonical history; its version of the 1965 events was the only one allowed in open discourse. By the mid-1990s, however, anonymous Internet communities and small publications had begun questioning the film's contents; one online message, sent anonymously through a mailing list, asked "If only a small section of the PKI leadership and military agents knew about [the coup, as in the film], how is it that over a million people were killed and thousands of people who knew nothing had to be imprisoned, exiled, and lost their civil rights?" Heryanto suggests that this resulted from an unintended polyphony in the film, while Sen and Hill opine that Noer may have been aware of the government's intent for propaganda and thus made the film's political message "obviously contradictory".

In September 1998, four months after the fall of Suharto, the Information Minister Yunus Yosfiah declared that the film would no longer be compulsory viewing material, reasoning that it was an attempt to manipulate history and create a cult with Suharto in the centre. Tempo reported in 2012 that Saleh Basarah of the Indonesian Air Force (former Chief of Staff of the Air Force) had influenced this decree. The magazine stated that Basarah had called the Education Minister Juwono Sudarsono and asked him to not screen Pengkhianatan G30S/PKI, as it was damaging to the Air Force. Two other films, Janur Kuning (Yellow Coconut Leaves; 1979) and Serangan Fajar, were likewise affected by the decree; Janur Kuning portrayed Suharto as the hero behind the historic General Offensive of 1 March 1949 in Yogyakarta while Serangan Fajar showed him as a major hero of the National Revolution. At the time it was suggested that TVRI was attempting to distance itself from the former president. This occurred in a period of desanctifying symbols related to the events, and by the early 2000s non-government versions of the G30S coup were easily available in Indonesia.

== Legacy ==
Pengkhianatan G30S/PKI has proven to be Noer's most controversial film, although until his death in 1995 the director remained publicly ambivalent. The film's visuals have generally received positive reviews, but its use for propaganda and historical accuracy have been widely condemned. The Indonesian director Hanung Bramantyo praised the film's style, stating that close-up shots of men smoking were "brilliant" and that, at times, he felt "it's not a film. But real!" (Note: Original: "... itu bukan film. Tapi real!") The director Monty Tiwa likewise praised the film's shots, citing a scene where Pandjaitan's daughter cries hysterically as her father is shot as "full of drama and using a shot [he had] never seen before in an Indonesian film". (Note: Original: "... (efel) [sic] dramatis yang tinggi dan shot yang belum pernah saya lihat dalam film Indonesia.") Sen and Hill, however, find "none of the aesthetic hallmarks" of the director's other works.

Hilmar Farid, an Indonesian historian, called the film propaganda mixed with "some [of the New Order's] fantasies"; (Note: Original: "... sejumlah fantasi.") the Vice journalist Arzia Tivany Wargadiredja echoed this classification. The reporter Hendro Subroto, who recorded the retrieval of the generals' bodies from Lubang Buaya, criticised the film's accuracy in 2001; he stated that the bodies did not show any evidence of torture. The former Lekra writer Putu Oka Sukanta, meanwhile, described the film as underplaying the suffering of PKI members and other leftists in the events following the G30S coup, thus becoming "a lie to the people". (Note: Original: " ... pembohongan pada masyarakat ...") The historian John Roosa contrasts the portrayal of the G30S leadership with a document by Brigadier General M.A. Supardjo, which portrays the coup – led by "flummoxed, indecisive, and disorganized" men – as largely defeating itself.

In a 2012 interview, Katamsi admitted the film was in part overacted and that it had been a potent way to spread and indoctrinate viewers in the New Order's ideology. The Tempo survey suggested that it was effective, leading viewers to "reject all that smelled of the PKI and communism". (Note: Original: "... menolak semua yang berbau PKI dan komunis.") Although by the mid-2000s it was no longer broadcast on 30 September, beginning in 2017, twenty years after the last mandatory broadcasting of Pengkhianatan G30S/PKI, several groups began hosting watch parties of the film to coincide with the day of the incident. It was voluntarily rebroadcast by SCTV, tvOne, and TVRI through the end of the decade. In 2021, TVRI announced that it would not air the film, as it was no longer compulsory. A video CD edition was released by Virgo in 2001, and the G30S/PKI museum at Lubang Buaya offers regular screenings in an on-site cinema. Both a 35 mm and VHS copy are stored at Sinematek Indonesia in Jakarta.

== See also ==
- The Year of Living Dangerously, a 1982 Australian film framed around the G30S coup
- Puisi Tak Terkuburkan, a 2000 Indonesian film following a poet who is wrongly arrested for being a communist
- The Act of Killing (2012) and The Look of Silence (2014), a pair of documentary films about the killings of communists after the coup

== Works cited ==
- "3 Pemeran Sentral di Film Pengkhianatan G30S/PKI" [3 Central Figures in Pengkhianatan G30S/PKI]. Tempo (in Indonesian). 29 September 2012. Archived from the original on 31 December 2013.
- Barker, Thomas (2011). "Mempertanyakan Gagasan 'Film Nasional'" [Questioning the Concept of 'National Films']. In Cheng, Khoo Gaik; Barker, Thomas; Imanjaya, Ekky (eds.). Mau Dibawa ke Mana Sinema Kita? [Where Will Our Cinema Go?] (in Indonesian). Jakarta: Salemba Humanika. ISBN 978-602-8555-38-8.
- Dahm, Bernhard (1971). History of Indonesia in the Twentieth Century. London: Praeger. OCLC 230842.
- "Djakarta 1966". filmindonesia.or.id (in Indonesian). Jakarta: Konfidan Foundation. Archived from the original on 31 December 2013.
- Dwiharti, Wieke; Mulyani, Ade (2011). Jakarta Panduan Wisata Tanpa Mall [Jakarta Tourist Guide Without Malls] (in Indonesian). Jakarta: Gramedia. ISBN 978-979-22-5820-2.
- Fathiyah, Alia (29 September 2012). "Film Pengkhianatan G30S/PKI di Mata Para Pemeran" [The Film Pengkhianatan G30S/PKI in its Cast's Eyes]. Tempo (in Indonesian).
- "Film-film Sejarah Kontemporer: Bukan Sekadar Adegan Perang" [Contemporary History Films: Not Only War Scenes]. Kompas (in Indonesian). 1 August 1993. p. 6.
- Heider, Karl G (1991). Indonesian Cinema: National Culture on Screen. Honolulu: University of Hawaii Press. ISBN 978-0-8248-1367-3.
- Heryanto, Ariel (2006). State Terrorism and Political Identity in Indonesia: Fatally Belonging. New York: Routledge. ISBN 978-0-415-37152-0. Archived from the original on 24 April 2016.
- "Historial [sic] Exchange Rate Regime of Asian Countries". Chinese University of Hong Kong. 2000. Archived from the original on 15 January 2013.
- Indrietta, Nieke (29 September 2012). "Film Pengkhianatan G30S/PKI di Mata Para Sineas" [The Film Pengkhianatan G30S/PKI in Cinema Workers' Eyes]. Tempo (in Indonesian). Archived from the original on 31 December 2013.
- Indrietta, Nieke (29 September 2012). "Film Pengkhianatan G30S/PKI, Dicerca dan Dipuji" [The Film Pengkhianatan G30S/PKI, Slammed and Praised]. Tempo (in Indonesian). Archived from the original on 31 December 2013.
- Irfani, Faisal (28 September 2018). "Kok Bisa Film G30S/PKI Ditayangkan Lagi oleh SCTV dan TV One?" [Reason the G30S/PKI Film is Still being Aired by SCTV and TV One]. Tirto.id (in Indonesian). Archived from the original on 11 August 2021.
- "Janur Kuning". filmindonesia.or.id (in Indonesian). Jakarta: Konfidan Foundation. Archived from the original on 31 March 2014.
- "Komentar Soeharto Usai Lihat Film Pengkhianatan G30S/PKI" [Soeharto's Comments after Watching the Film Pengkhianatan G30S/PKI]. Tempo (in Indonesian). 29 September 2012. Archived from the original on 31 December 2013.
- "Kredit Pengkhianatan G-30-S PKI" [Credits for Pengkhianatan G-30-S PKI]. filmindonesia.or.id (in Indonesian). Jakarta: Konfidan Foundation. Archived from the original on 31 March 2014.
- Marselli (31 December 1984). "Film Pengkhianatan G30S/PKI: Sebuah Dokumentar yang Menyimpan Dendam" [Film Pengkhianatan G30S/PKI: A Documentary with a Grudge]. Kompas (in Indonesian). p. vii.
- McGlynn, John H; Sulistyo, Hermawan (2007). Indonesia in the Soeharto Years: Issues, Incidents and Images. Jakarta: Lontar Foundation. ISBN 978-9971-69-358-9.
- McGregor, Katharine E (2007). History in Uniform: Military Ideology and the Construction of Indonesia's Past. Honolulu: University of Honolulu Press. ISBN 978-9971-69-360-2. Archived from the original on 26 April 2016.
- "Menyoal Pencabutan Tayangan Film G 30 S PKI: 'Arifin Gunakan Bahan dari Cornell University'" [Dealing with the film G 30 S PKI being Rescinded: 'Arifin Used Material from Cornell University']. Merdeka (in Indonesian). 1 September 1998. p. 8.
- Mulligan, Diane (2005). "The Discourse of Dangdut: Gender and Civil Society in Indonesia". In Howell, Jude; Mulligan, Diane (eds.). Gender and Civil Society: Transcending Boundaries. New York: Routledge. ISBN 978-1-134-30832-3.
- Paramadhita, Intan (4 April 2011). "Questions on witnessing violence". The Jakarta Post. Archived from the original on 24 October 2012.
- "Penghargaan Budak Nafsu" [Awards for Budak Nafsu]. filmindonesia.or.id (in Indonesian). Jakarta: National Library of Indonesia and Sinamatek. Archived from the original on 18 July 2014.
- "Penghargaan Djakarta 1966" [Awards for Djakarta 1966]. filmindonesia.or.id (in Indonesian). Jakarta: National Library of Indonesia and Sinamatek. Archived from the original on 1 July 2015.
- "Penghargaan Pengkhianatan G-30-S PKI" [Awards for Pengkhianatan G-30-S PKI]. filmindonesia.or.id (in Indonesian). Jakarta: Konfidan Foundation. Archived from the original on 31 March 2014.
- "Penghargaan Ponirah Terpidana" [Awards for Ponirah Terpidana]. filmindonesia.or.id (in Indonesian). Jakarta: Konfidan Foundation. Archived from the original on 1 July 2015.
- "Pengkhianatan G-30-S PKI". filmindonesia.or.id (in Indonesian). Jakarta: Konfidan Foundation. Archived from the original on 25 October 2012.
- "'Pengkhianatan G30S/PKI' Pecahkan Rekor Penonton DKI" ['Pengkhianatan G30S/PKI' Breaks Jakarta Box Office Record]. Kompas (in Indonesian). 31 December 1984. p. III.
- "Penumpasan Sisa-sisa PKI Blitar Selatan (Operasi Trisula)". filmindonesia.or.id (in Indonesian). Jakarta: Konfidan Foundation. Archived from the original on 24 December 2013.
- Prastiwi, Devitra (24 September 2017). "Menkopolhukam: Hentikan Polemik Pemutaran Film G30S/PKI" [Coordinating Ministry for Political, Legal and Security Affairs: Stop Polemic on G30S/PKI Film Airing]. Liputan 6 (in Indonesian). SCTV. Archived from the original on 11 August 2021.
- Prijosusilo, Bramantyo (29 September 2007). "G30S a nagging wound Indonesia eager to deny". The Jakarta Post. Archived from the original on 3 July 2015.
- "Proses Arifin C. Noer Bikin Pengkhianatan G30S/PKI" [Arifin C. Noer's process in making Pengkhianatan G30S/PKI]. Tempo (in Indonesian). 29 September 2012. Archived from the original on 31 December 2013.
- Purmasari, Niken (28 September 2018). "Jadi Perbincangan, PFN Jelaskan Hak Siar Film G30/SPKI" [PFN Explains Airing Rights of G30S/PKI Film Upon Popular Discussions] (in Indonesian). detik.com. Trans Media. Archived from the original on 11 August 2021.
- "Rano Karno: Obsesi Terpendam tentang Betawi" [Rano Karno: Hidden Obsession about Batavia]. Kompas (in Indonesian). 27 June 1993. p. 7.
- Revianur, Aditya (25 July 2012). "Korban 65: Film Pengkhianatan G30S/PKI Pembohongan Publik" [Victim of 65: The Film Pengkhianatan G30S/PKI is a Lie to the Public]. Kompas (in Indonesian). Archived from the original on 19 August 2012.
- Ricklefs, M. C. (1993). A History of Modern Indonesia since c.1300 (2nd ed.). Hampshire: Macmillan. ISBN 978-0-333-57689-2.
- Rini K; Evan (30 September 2012). "Tokoh di Balik Penghentian Pemutaran Film G30S" [Persons Behind the Ceasing of Screenings of the G30S Film]. Tempo (in Indonesian). Archived from the original on 5 September 2019.
- Roosa, John (2006). Pretext for Mass Murder: The September 30th Movement and Suharto's Coup D'état in Indonesia. Madison: University of Wisconsin Press. ISBN 978-0-299-22030-3.
- Sari, Dianing (29 September 2012). "Film Pengkhianatan G30S/PKI, Propaganda Berhasilkah?" [The Film Pengkhianatan G30S/PKI, Successful Propaganda?]. Tempo (in Indonesian). Archived from the original on 13 June 2022.
- "Satu Perempuan, Empat C Noer" [One Woman, Four C Noers]. Republika Minggu (in Indonesian). 30 March 1997. p. 7.
- Sen, Krishna (1994). Indonesian Cinema: Framing the New Order. Atlantic Highlands: Zed Books. ISBN 978-1-85649-124-2.
- Sen, Krishna; Hill, David T. (2006). Media, Culture and Politics in Indonesia. Jakarta: Equinox Publishing. ISBN 978-979-3780-42-9. Archived from the original on 10 July 2020.
- "Serangan Fajar". filmindonesia.or.id (in Indonesian). Jakarta: Konfidan Foundation. Archived from the original on 31 March 2014.
- Sijabat, Ridwan Max (15 October 2003). "Indonesia yet to move on from painful past". The Jakarta Post. Archived from the original on 3 July 2015.
- "Soeharto belum puas dengan film G30S/PKI". Tabloid Posmo (in Indonesian). 4 October 2017.
- "Sosok 'Dalang' Film Pengkhianatan G30S/PKI" [The Puppetmaster Behind the Film Pengkhianatan G30S/PKI]. Tempo (in Indonesian). 29 September 2012. Archived from the original on 31 December 2013.
- Suryanto (30 September 2021). "TVRI tidak akan tayangkan film "Pengkhianatan G 30 S PKI"" [TVRI to stop airing "Pengkhianatan G 30 S PKI" film]. Antara (in Indonesian). Archived from the original on 1 October 2021.
- Taum, Yoseph Yapi (March 2008). "Lubang Buaya: Mitos dan Kontra-Mitos" [Lubang Buaya: Myth and Counter-Myth]. Sintesis (in Indonesian). 6 (1). Yogyakarta: Sanata Dharma University: 14–39. ISSN 1693-749X.
- Tivany Wargadiredja, Arzia (2 October 2018). "The Creators of 'G30S/PKI' Reflect on the Film's Impact Three Decades Later". Vice. Archived from the original on 9 July 2021.
- Vickers, Adrian (2012). "Sakti Reconsidered: Power and the Disenchantment of the World". In Chua, Liana; Cook, Joanna; Long, Nicholas; Wilson, Lee (eds.). Southeast Asian Perspectives on Power. New York: Routledge. ISBN 978-1-136-33717-8.
