= Herbert Feith =

Australian academic

- Born: 3 November 1930; Vienna, Austria
- Died: 15 November 2001 (aged 71); Melbourne, Australia
- Education: Cornell University University of Melbourne
- Occupation: Academic
- Known for: Work as a scholar of Indonesian politics and activities as an activist in support of social justice
- Spouse: Betty Feith (nee Evans)

Herbert Feith (3 November 1930 – 15 November 2001) was an Australian academic and world leading scholar of Indonesian politics.

== Background ==
Born in Vienna, Austria in 1930, Feith witnessed oppression of the Jews and witnessed Kristallnacht in 1938 at the age of 7. He came to Australia as a refugee in 1939 with his Austrian Jewish parents, one of a few thousand Jews granted humanitarian visas. He took an undergraduate degree in political science at the University of Melbourne, working with Professor William Macmahon Ball. After graduating, fascinated with Asia and inspired by Molly Bondan, he got a job in Jakarta in at the Indonesian Department of Information and worked from 1951 to 1952 as an Indonesian civil servant on a local salary. This gave him contacts and language fluency. His Masters at Melbourne was completed in 1954.

Still in his twenties, he helped to negotiate an inter-governmental agreement whereby new Australian graduates could volunteer for service as Indonesian public servants. The Volunteer Graduate Scheme has expanded to become Australian Volunteers International. Feith and his new wife, Betty, returned to Indonesia as the first volunteers under the scheme from 1954 to 1956. Later he obtained a PhD scholarship at Cornell University (1957–1960). His thesis later became a renowned book, The Decline of Constitutional Democracy in Indonesia.

After working as a post-doctoral fellow at the Australian National University he was appointed to a lectureship in Politics at Monash University in Melbourne, in the early 1960s. He helped found the Monash Centre of Southeast Asian Studies, which became one of the world's best institutes on the region. He was promoted to Professor in 1968. Unusually, he demoted himself 1974, to avoid bureaucracy associated with the Chair. He re-oriented from academic scholarship to more activist work, but continued teaching and research, taking early retirement from Monash in 1990.

In retirement he returned to Indonesia with Betty, teaching at Gadjah Mada University in Yogyakarta and Andalas University in Padang, West Sumatra, again on local salaries. A lifelong Melbourne cyclist, he died while pushing his bicycle across a train line near his small house in Glen Iris, Melbourne. Feith was 71 years old, and had three children and several grandchildren.

== Recognition and activism ==
Feith was guided by a strong sense of social justice, human rights and worked with international peace movements. In Melbourne he assisted Indonesian asylum seekers who faced persecution under the Suharto regime, and was active in a range of campaigns. With Amnesty International, he negotiated to free political prisoners in Indonesia. He practised voluntary simplicity and was renowned as an inspiring lecturer and teacher.

Although relationships with some nationalist contacts became difficult, he supported West Papuan independence and assisted at the violent elections in East Timor in 1999. He was "a staunch defender of the right to self-determination of the East Timorese people; but rather than adopting a confrontational approach, he would offer face-saving solutions that would allow Indonesia to withdraw with dignity".

The Herb Feith Foundation was established after his death to undertake a number of activities in the fields of education and publishing related to Indonesia and East Timor. The Herb Feith Chair at Monash was established in 2007. Greg Barton was the inaugural Chair (2007-2015), and followed by Ariel Heryanto (2016-2019). In December 2016 the foundation presented a human rights education award to Indonesian poet Putu Oka Sukanta. The Foundation was wound up in 2018 and replaced by the Monash Herb Feith Indonesian Engagement Centre.

== Key publications ==
- Feith, H. 1962. The Decline of Constitutional Democracy in Indonesia. Ithaca: Cornell University Press. ISBN 0-8014-0126-7
- Feith, H. & L. Castles. 1970. Indonesian Political Thinking, 1945–1965. Ithaca: Cornell University Press. (Indonesian trans. 1988)
- Feith, H. 1971. Asia's Flashpoint, 1971: Bangla Desh. Bedford Park, S.A.: Flinders University.
- Mortimer R., H. Feith and R. Tiffen (eds). 1984. Stubborn Survivors: Dissenting Essays On Peasants And Third World Development. Melbourne: Centre of Southeast Asian Studies, Monash University.
- Scott D., H. Feith and P. Walsh. 1992. East Timor: Towards A Just Peace in The 1990s. Canberra, A.C.T.: Australian Council for Overseas Aid.
- Feith H., E. Baulch and P. Walsh. 1994. George J. Aditjondro, East Timor: an Indonesian intellectual speaks out. Deakin, A.C.T.: Australian Council for Overseas Aid.
- Feith, H. 1995. Soekarno militer dalam demokrasi terpimpin. Jakarta: Pustaka Sinar Harapan.
- Aspinall E., H. Feith & G. Van Klinken (eds) 1999. The Last Days of President Suharto. Clayton, Vic: Monash Asia Institute.
- Feith, H. 1999. Pemilihan umum 1955 di Indonesia. Jakarta: Kepustakaan Populer Gramedia.

== Biography ==
- Purdey, J. 2011. From Vienna to Yogyakarta: The life of Herb Feith. Sydney: UNSW Press. ISBN 978-1-74223-280-5
- Chris Manning, Harold Crouch and John Maxwell. 2002. 'Herb Feith', Bulletin of Indonesian Economic Studies, 38(10), pp. 39–41.
- Purdey, J. (ed.) 2012. Knowing Indonesia: Intersections of Self, Discipline and Nation. Clayton Vic: Monash University Press.
