= Gitgit Waterfall =

Waterfall in Indonesia

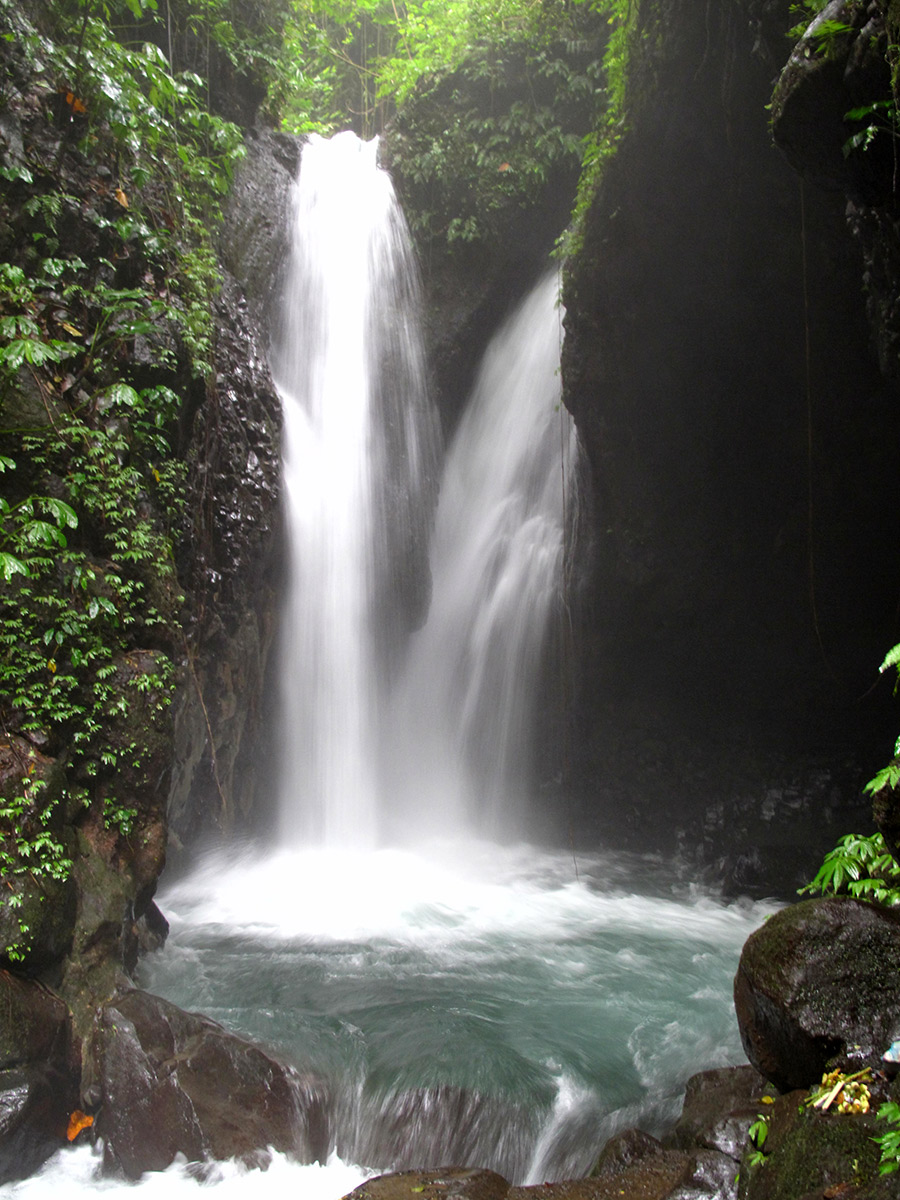
- Interactive map of Gitgit Waterfall
- Location: Bali, Indonesia
- Coordinates: 08°11′28.71″S 115°08′04.84″E
- Total height: 35 m (115 ft)

Gitgit Waterfall (Indonesian: Air Terjun Gitgit, Balinese: ᬕ᭄ᬭᭀᬩᭀᬕᬦ᭄ᬕᬶᬢ᭄ᬕᬶᬢ᭄, Grobogan Gitgit) is a waterfall on Bali, Indonesia. It is located on the north of the Southeast Asian island between the old island capital of Singaraja and the inland village of Munduk. The waterfall is a popular tourist destination in Bali, known for its height and the surrounding foliage and natural swimming pools, accessible by a rocky walking trail. The falls are located in Gitgit Village in the Sukasada District, around 10 kilometres (6.2 mi) from Singaraja, 26 kilometres (16 mi) from Munduk and 83 kilometres (52 mi) from Denpasar's Ngurah Rai International Airport.

== See also ==
- List of waterfalls
