= Film Negara =

Film Negara or Filem Negara may refer to:

- Produksi Film Negara, an Indonesian state-owned film funding and former film production company
- Filem Negara Malaysia, a former Malaysian government film department and film production house
