= Little Theatre (Indonesia) =

Theatrical group est. 1968

Little Theatre (Indonesia, Teater Kecil) is a theatrical group established by Indonesian poet and writer, Arifin C. Noer after he moved to Jakarta in the year 1968. Little Theatre becomes one of Indonesia's revolution in Indonesia's theatrical world . Their strength lies within their scripts which are rich with reflection of problems, hope and integrity of the poor in Indonesia.
