= Janur Kuning =

1980 film by Alam Surawidjaja

- VCD cover
- Directed by: Alam Surawidjaja
- Written by: Syafnizal Durab; Arto Hady
- Produced by: Abbas Wiranatakusuma
- Starring: Kaharuddin Syah; Deddy Sutomo; Dicky Zukarnaen
- Cinematography: Kasdullah
- Edited by: Soemardjono
- Music by: Sudharnoto
- Production company: Metro 77
- Release date: 1980 (Indonesia)
- Running time: 127 minutes
- Country: Indonesia
- Language: Indonesian
- Budget: Rp. 375 million

Janur Kuning (literally Yellow Coconut Leaves) is a 1980 Indonesian war film directed by Alam Surawidjaja and produced by Abbas Wiranatakusuma. Starring Kaharuddin Syah, Deddy Sutomo, and Dicky Zulkarnaen, it follows the Indonesian revolutionaries six-hour assault on Yogyakarta, under Suharto, in a show of force against the Dutch army. At the time the most expensive domestic production ever, the film's title is meant to symbolise the Indonesian people's struggle. A critical success, Janur Kuning received a nomination and two special awards at the 1980 Indonesian Film Festival. It was screened annually on 1 March between 1980 and 1998, but has since been criticised as an attempt to manipulate history and create a cult with President Suharto in the centre.

== Plot ==
In 1948, three years after the Indonesian National Revolution began, the Dutch army invades the republican capital at Yogyakarta. Commander in Chief of the Army Sudirman (Deddy Sutomo) escapes, while the city's sultan Hamengkubuwana IX must stay there with his people and the national leadership. Sudirman, after escaping from the Dutch who were following him, goes on a guerrilla campaign.

The following year, Lieutenant Colonel Suharto (Kaharuddin Syah) devises a daring plan, a show of force in the capital. Early in the morning on 1 March 1949 he takes his soldiers – all in full uniform – and retakes the city, overwhelming the Dutch. After six hours Suharto and his men retreat, as planned. Several months later the Dutch recognise Indonesia's independence.

== Production ==
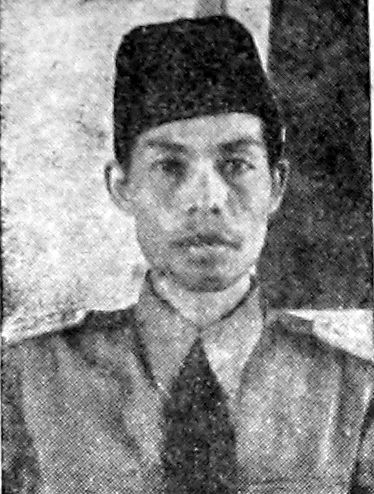
The film's portrayal of Sudirman has been described as having mystic powers.

Janur Kuning was directed by Alam Surawidjaja and produced by Abbas Wiranatakusuma of the Jakarta-based production house Metro 77. The script was written by Syafnizal Durab in collaboration with Arto Hady, while cinematography was completed by Kasdullah. In post-production Soemardjono handled editing and Sudharnoto and Suparman Sidik handled music and other sound effects. Kaharuddin Syah starred as Suharto, while Deddy Sutomo played Sudirman; other cast members included Amak Baldjun and Dicky Zulkarnaen.

Janur Kuning was the most expensive Indonesian film up to that point, with a budget of Rp. 375 million. The cost led production to be held up for over a month when the allocated funds were unavailable. It was the second domestic production to deal with the 1 March general assault, after Usmar Ismail's Enam Djam di Djogdja (Six Hours in Jogja; 1951). The film's title, which refers to immature coconut leaves, is meant to symbolise the Indonesian people's struggle against the Dutch colonists. In the film, fighters wear the leaves on their sleeves to show their loyalty.

A scene was filmed, several minutes long, showing Sudirman meeting and hugging Sultan Hamengkubuwana IX after returning from his guerrilla campaign. According to Sutomo, the scene was cut because the censors working for Suharto's New Order disapproved of it. Sudirman, sickly from tuberculosis during his guerrilla campaign, is depicted as having mystic powers: the military historian Katherine McGregor notes such an effect in one scene, where Sudirman whispers a prayer and causes the rain to fall, distracting his Dutch pursuers and allowing him to escape.

Several small scenes were filmed using foreign high school students from Jakarta International School, who were brought to Yogjakarta to portray the Dutch soldiers during their midterm break from school. Additional European extras were recruited from the ranks of young overland travelers from the US, Australia, Germany and other Western countries.

== Release and reception ==
Janur Kuning was released in 1980. At that year's Indonesian Film Festival, Amak Baldjun was nominated for a Citra Award for Best Supporting Actor for his role in the film. Two special awards were also given at the ceremony, for Producer Supporting the People's Struggle (Producer Film yang Mengolah Perjuangan Bangsa and Hopeful Actor (Pemeran Harapan Pria). It has remained well received. In an overview of Indonesian patriotic films for The Jakarta Globe, Awis Mranani wrote that Janur Kuning was "one to watch".

After its release, Janur Kuning was broadcast annually on TVRI on 1 March. In September 1998, four months after the fall of Suharto, Information Minister Yunus Yosfiah stated that the film was an attempt to manipulate history and create a cult with Suharto in the centre. Two other films, Serangan Fajar (Dawn Attack; 1981) and Pengkhianatan G30S/PKI (Treachery of G30S/PKI; 1984), were also affected by the decree. Serangan Fajar portrayed Suharto as a great hero of the revolution, especially the 1 March General Assault, while Pengkhianatan G30S/PKI emphasised the former president's role in destroying the 30 September Movement coup in 1965. The accuracy of Janur Kuning had been questioned as early as its release.

A 35 mm copy is stored at Sinematek Indonesia in Jakarta.

== Works cited ==
- Armitrianto, Adhitia (2 March 2009). "Ingat Janur Kuning" [Remembers Janur Kuning]. Suara Merdeka (in Indonesian). Semarang. Archived from the original on 4 March 2016.
- Dharmawan, Bagus (2008). Warisan (daripada) Soeharto [Legacy (from) Soeharto] (in Indonesian). Jakarta: Kompas. ISBN 978-979-709-364-8.
- "Enam Djam di Djogdja". filmindonesia.or.id (in Indonesian). Jakarta: Konfidan Foundation. Archived from the original on 6 April 2014.
- "Janur Kuning". filmindonesia.or.id (in Indonesian). Jakarta: Konfidan Foundation. Archived from the original on 31 March 2014.
- "Kredit Janur Kuning" [Credits for Janur Kuning]. filmindonesia.or.id (in Indonesian). Jakarta: Konfidan Foundation. Archived from the original on 3 July 2015.
- McGregor, Katharine E (2007). History in Uniform: Military Ideology and the Construction of Indonesia's Past. Honolulu: University of Honolulu Press. ISBN 978-9971-69-360-2.
- Mranani, Awis (17 August 2011). "Indonesia's Fights for Freedom on Screen". The Jakarta Globe.
- "Penghargaan Janur Kuning" [Awards for Janur Kuning]. filmindonesia.or.id (in Indonesian). Jakarta: Konfidan Foundation. Archived from the original on 31 August 2014.
- "Pengkhianatan G-30-S PKI". filmindonesia.or.id (in Indonesian). Jakarta: Konfidan Foundation. Archived from the original on 25 October 2012.
- Prihtiyani, Eny (15 December 2010). "Janur Kuning, Simbol Perlawanan" [Yellow Coconut Leaves, Symbols of Resistance]. Kompas (in Indonesian). Jakarta. Archived from the original on 4 March 2016.
- Rini K; Evan (30 September 2012). "Tokoh di Balik Penghentian Pemutaran Film G30S" [Persons Behind the Ceasing of Screenings of the G30S Film]. Tempo (in Indonesian). Archived from the original on 5 September 2019.
- Sen, Krishna; Hill, David T. (2006). Media, Culture and Politics in Indonesia. Jakarta: Equinox Publishing. ISBN 978-979-3780-42-9.
- "Serangan Fajar". filmindonesia.or.id (in Indonesian). Jakarta: Konfidan Foundation. Archived from the original on 31 March 2014.
