= Berita Film Indonesia =

Company of Indonesia

- Type: Government-owned corporation
- Industry: Film
- Founded: Jakarta, Indonesia (6 October 1945)
- Defunct: 1950 (disputed)
- Fate: Merged with Regerings Film Bedrijf
- Successor: Perusahaan Pilem Negara
- Headquarters: Batavia, Dutch East Indies
- Area served: Indonesia
- Key people: RM Soetarto (head); Rd Ariffien (head)
- Products: Newsreels and documentaries

Berita Film Indonesia (abbreviated BFI; "Indonesian News Films") was the first government-owned film production company of Indonesia. BFI was formally established on 6 October 1945, after the Japanese occupation army surrendered, using the same equipment and studio as the Japanese studio Nippon Eigasha. The company, under RM Soetarto and Rd Ariffien, was soon forced to leave Jakarta for Surakarta and later Yogyakarta owing to the ongoing revolution against the former Dutch colonists. After the Netherlands recognised Indonesia's independence in December 1949, BFI was merged with the Dutch-owned Regerings Film Bedrijf.

Newsreels and documentaries produced by BFI covered numerous events in Indonesian history and have been reused for further works. In 1985 the company's history was dramaticised as Film dan Peristiwa (Film and Events) by Usman Effendy.

== History ==
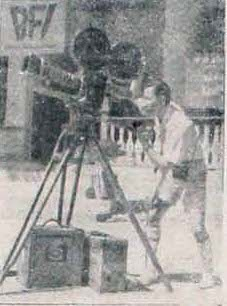
One of the Wong brothers, working for BFI. The BFI logo is visible in the background.

During the Japanese occupation of the Dutch East Indies, the Japanese appropriated the Dutch-owned Multi Film to establish the film production company Nippon Eigasha in Jakarta, the colony's capital. This included all of Multi Film's equipment, with which Nippon Eigasha produced one featured film – Berdjoang (1943) – six short films, and several newsreels. All were of propagandic nature.

The day after President Sukarno proclaimed Indonesia's independence on 17 August 1945, a number of native Indonesian employees of Nippon Eigasha formed Berita Film Indonesia (BFI), taking an Evemo-brand camera and several rolls of film.

Control of Nippon Eigasha was formally transferred to the Information Ministry of the Indonesian government, under Information Minister Amir Syarifuddin on 6 October 1945, preceding a Japanese withdrawal. The venture retained the name BFI and was headed by R. M. Soetarto and Rd Ariffien. Soetarto had been a deputy director of Nippon Eigasha during the occupation, while Ariffien had directed five feature films before and during the occupation, including Berdjoang. BFI soon began producing newsreels and documentaries.

When the allied Dutch and British forces occupied Jakarta in November 1945, BFI and its crew began working out of a hospital; the studios were occupied by the Dutch and housed two production companies: the state-owned Regerings Film Bedrijf (RFB) and the privately held South Pacific Film Corp. By December, however, the situation had grown unsafe and BFI was moved to Surakarta, Central Java, and later Yogyakarta. BFI was one of numerous corporations, including the national government, which evacuated Jakarta and moved to Yogyakarta during this period.

In Yogyakarta, Soetarto, Ariffien, and their crew, which included Soetarto's brother Soeharto and the cameraman Sutan Nazar, continued their efforts to record historic events. Owing to the ongoing national revolution, supplies were scarce, including film stock.

Example images

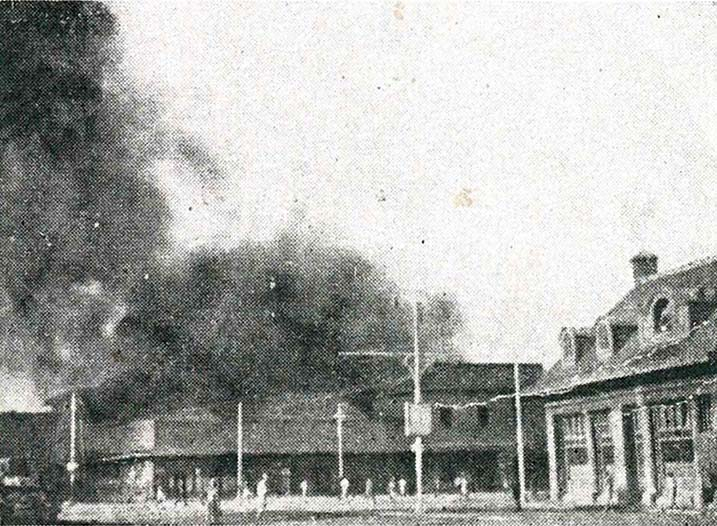
Battle of Surabaya

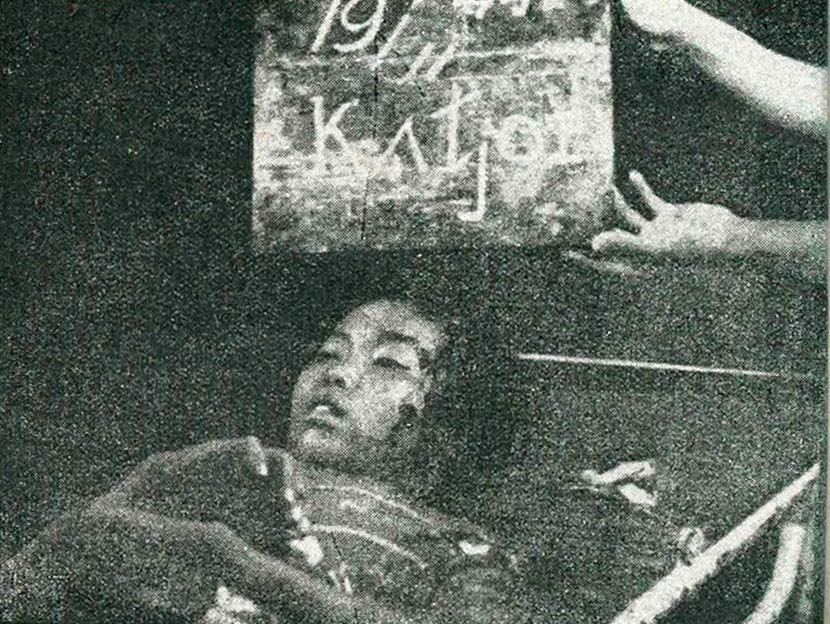
Casualty of the Indonesian National Revolution

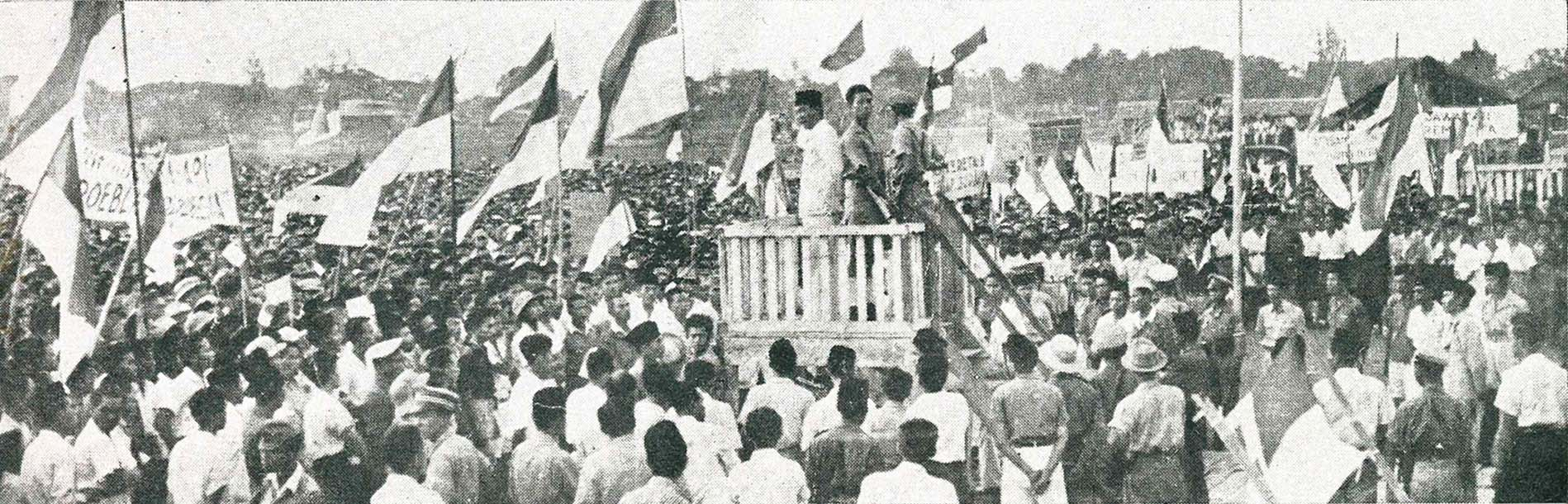
Sukarno speaking at Ikada Square

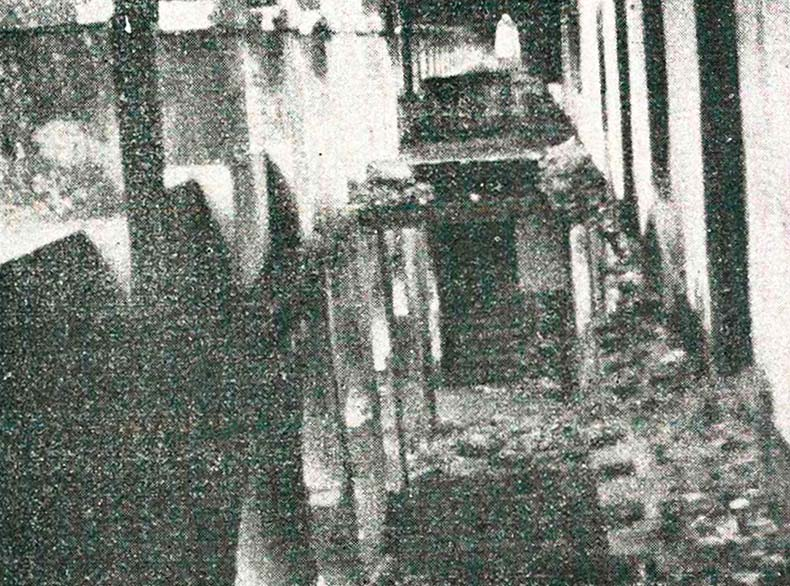
Damage following the Battle of Ambarawa

After the Dutch recognised Indonesia's independence in December 1949, the Indonesian government acquired RFB. RFB and BFI were then combined into the Perusahaan Pilem Negara, later renamed Perusahaan Film Negara (State Film Company; PFN). The BFI employees stationed in Yogyakarta returned to Jakarta to work at PFN. The company, since renamed Perum Produksi Film Negara, remains incorporated as of 2012 but has become inactive and may face liquidation.

== Legacy ==
During its existence BFI produced 13 newsreels and documentaries on events including the Madiun Affair, Operation Product, Operation Kraai, and the Linggadjati and Renville Agreements. These works were the basis of several later ones, produced during the early 1950s, following Indonesia's actions during the national revolution. They were also compiled in the 1951 documentary Indonesia Fights for Freedom, distributed to the United Nations. A semi-fictional account of BFI was presented in Usman Effendy's 1985 movie Film dan Peristiwa (Film and Events).

== Works cited ==
- "Berita Film Indonesia". Encyclopedia of Jakarta (in Indonesian). Jakarta City Government. Archived from the original on 1 January 2013.
- Biran, Misbach Yusa (2009). Sejarah Film 1900–1950: Bikin Film di Jawa [History of Film 1900–1950: Making Films in Java] (in Indonesian). Jakarta: Komunitas Bamboo working with the Jakarta Art Council. ISBN 978-979-3731-58-2.
- Danujaya, Budiarto; Tjasmadi, Mohammad Johan (1992). Layar Perak: 90 Tahun Bioskop di Indonesia [Silver Screen: 90 Years of Cinema in Indonesia] (in Indonesian). Jakarta: Gramedia. OCLC 28028443.
- "Film dan Peristiwa". filmindonesia.or.id (in Indonesian). Jakarta: Konfidan Foundation. Archived from the original on 5 March 2016.
- "Rd Ariffien" [Rd Ariffien]. filmindonesia.or.id (in Indonesian). Jakarta: Konfidan Foundation. Archived from the original on 16 January 2014.
- "RM Soetarto". filmindonesia.or.id (in Indonesian). Jakarta: Konfidan Foundation. Archived from the original on 6 March 2016.
- Sen, Krishna (1995). Indonesian Cinema: Framing the New Order. London: Zed Books. ISBN 978-1-85649-123-5.
- Suhendra, Zulfi (18 April 2012). "Mengintip Kantor Usang Produsen 'Si Unyil'" [Peeking at the Offices of the Producer of 'Si Unyil']. detik.com (in Indonesian). Jakarta.
