= Gedong Kirtya =

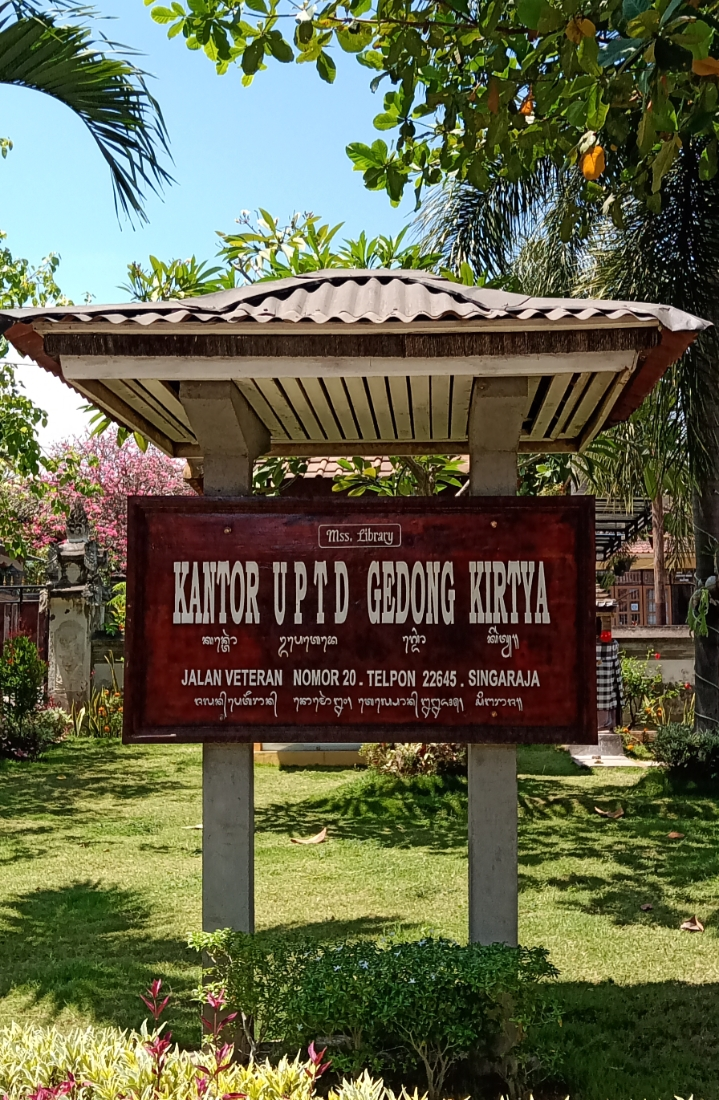
- Established: 2 June 1928
- Location: Jalan Veteran, No. 20, Kelurahan Paket Agung, Kecamatan Buleleng, Buleleng, Bali
- Coordinates: 8.124843°S 115.096201°E
- Founders: Herman Neubronner van der Tuuk; I Gusti Putu Djelantik; Liefrinck Van der Tuuk
- Owner: Buleleng Regency government

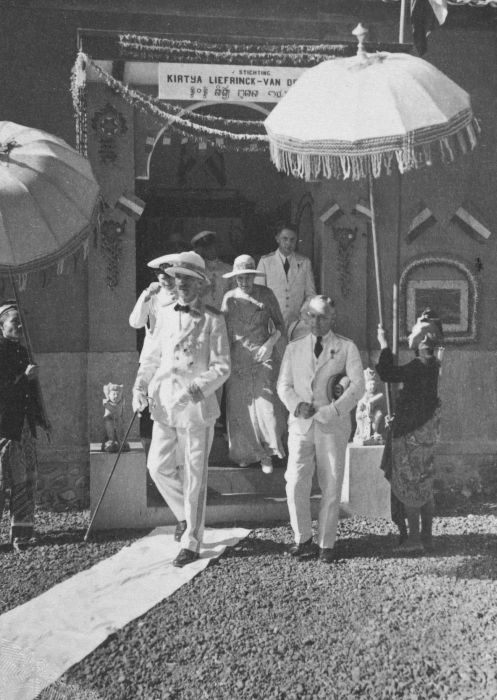
Governeur-General B.C. de Jonge visits Gedong Kirtya

Gedong Kirtya library was founded in 1928 by the Dutch in what was then their colonial capital of the Lesser Sunda Islands, Singaraja, and named for the Sanskrit word 'to try'. It is in the complex of Sasana Budaya, the old palace of the Buleleng Kingdom.

In its collection are lontar manuscripts (written on dried leaves of the rontal palm), prasasti (inscribed on copper plates) and manuscripts on paper in Balinese and Roman characters including documents from the colonial period (1901-1953).

== See also ==
- List of libraries in Indonesia
