= Singaraja =

Singaraja ᬲᬶᬗᬭᬚ (Balinese)
- Town
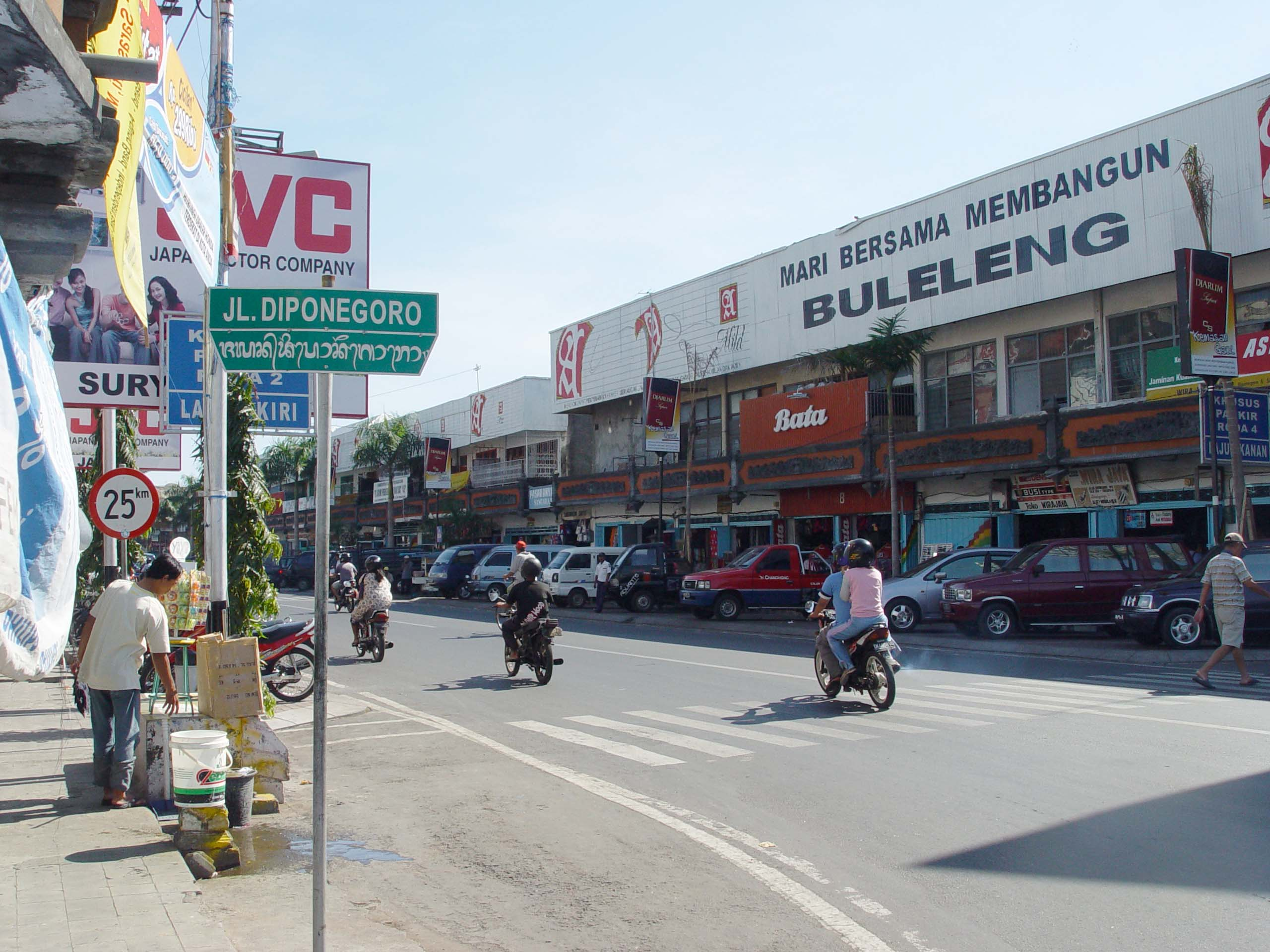
- Singaraja in 2005
- Nickname: Kota pendidikan (Indonesian) ("Education city")
- Location in Bali
- Coordinates: 8°07′S 115°05′E
- Country: Indonesia
- Province: Bali
- Regency: Buleleng Regency

Area
  - Total: 1,080 sq mi (2,798 km^{2})

Population (mid 2025 estimate)
  - Total: 156,261
  - Density: 144.6/sq mi (55.85/km^{2})
- Time zone: UTC+8 (Central Indonesia Standard Time)

Singaraja (Balinese: ᬲᬶᬗᬭᬚ; pronounced [siŋaˈrad͡ʒa]) is a port town in northern Bali, Indonesia, which serves as the seat of Buleleng Regency. The name is Indonesian for "Lion King" (from Sanskrit singha and raja). It is just east of Lovina Beach and is also the centre of Buleleng District, which covers an area of 46.25 km^{2} and had a population of 156,261 in 2025, the second largest on the island. The urban area itself, comprising the 17 urban villages (kelurahan) within the district, covers 16.28 km^{2}, and had a population of 94,806 in mid 2025.

== History ==
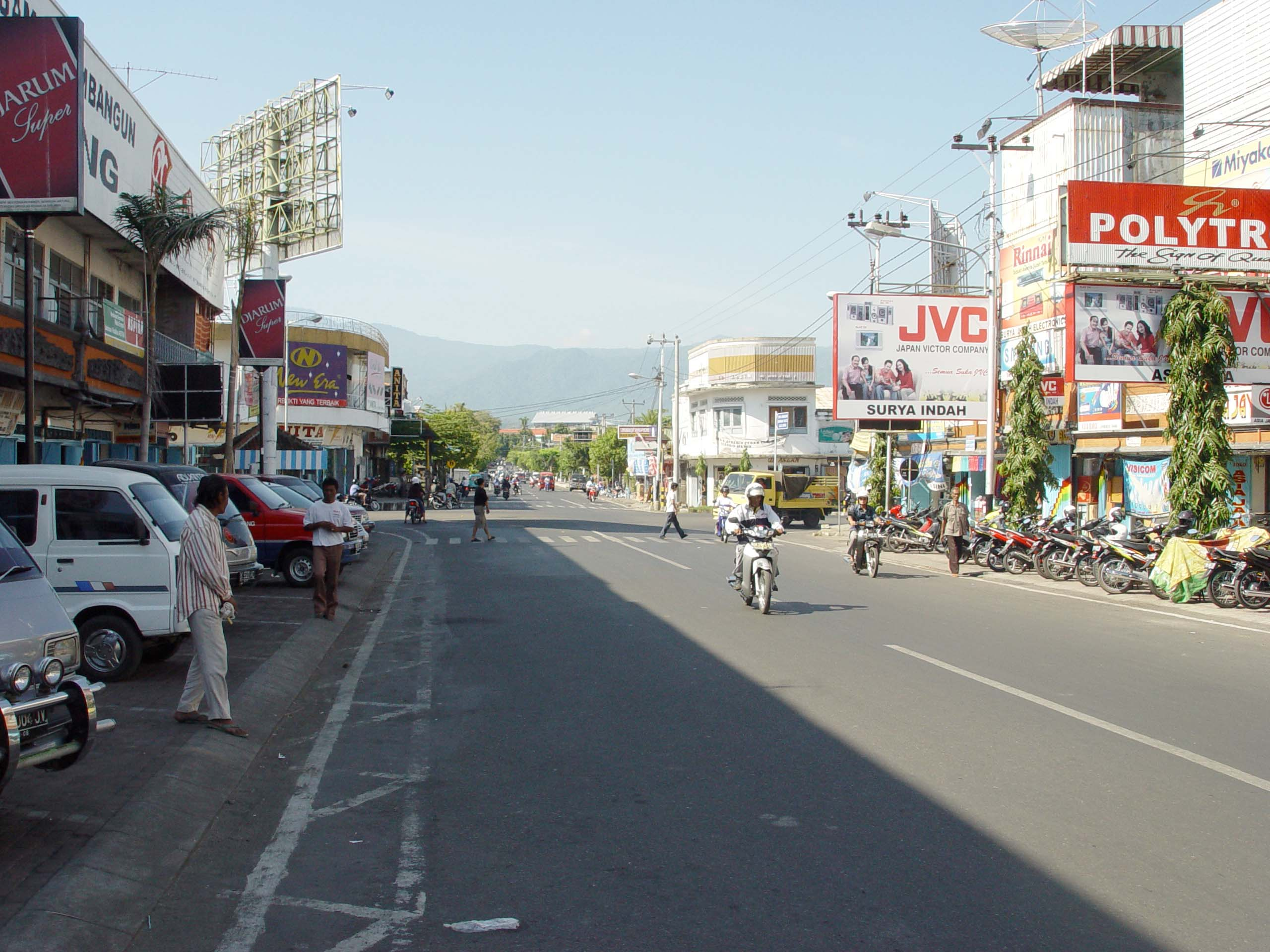
Near the crossing Street, Singaraja .

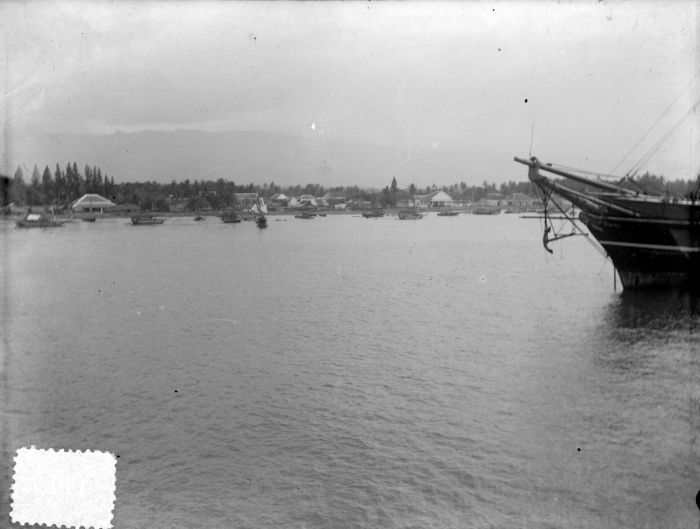
Buleleng Harbor in 1891

In the 17th century and 18th century Singaraja was the center of government of the Buleleng Kingdom. The capital of the Kingdom was in Sukasada. At that time I Gusti Anglurah Panji Sakti thought that the palace should be located in a strategic place, and finally Singaraja was chosen. The name of this city was taken from the authority of the King I Gusti Anglurah Panji Sakti.

In 1846 the Dutch colonized part of North Bali. Singaraja was the colonial capital for Bali and the Lesser Sunda Islands from 1849 until 1960. It was an administrative center and the port of arrival for most visitors until the development of the Bukit Peninsula area in the south. Singaraja was also an administrative center for the Japanese during their World War II occupation.

In the 2000s, the urban area was officially divided into 17 urban villages (kelurahan) in Buleleng District, while the rest of the district comprises 13 rural villages (desa).

Gedong Kirtya, just south of the town center, is the only library of lontar manuscripts (ancient and sacred texts on leaves of the rontal palm) in the world - apart from the Pustaka Lontar Museum in Penaban, north of Amlapura.

== Geography ==
=== Climate ===
Singaraja has a tropical savanna climate (Aw) with little to no rainfall from June to October and heavy rainfall from December to March. April, May, and November feature moderate rainfall.

Climate data for Singaraja
Month	Jan	Feb	Mar	Apr	May	Jun	Jul	Aug	Sep	Oct	Nov	Dec	Year
Mean daily maximum °C (°F)	31.2 (88.2)	31.3 (88.3)	31.4 (88.5)	31.8 (89.2)	31.4 (88.5)	30.9 (87.6)	30.4 (86.7)	30.6 (87.1)	31.4 (88.5)	32.3 (90.1)	32.4 (90.3)	31.8 (89.2)	31.4 (88.5)
Daily mean °C (°F)	26.8 (80.2)	26.9 (80.4)	26.8 (80.2)	26.8 (80.2)	26.5 (79.7)	25.9 (78.6)	25.4 (77.7)	25.7 (78.3)	26.3 (79.3)	27.1 (80.8)	27.3 (81.1)	27.1 (80.8)	26.6 (79.8)
Mean daily minimum °C (°F)	22.4 (72.3)	22.5 (72.5)	22.2 (72.0)	21.9 (71.4)	21.6 (70.9)	20.9 (69.6)	20.5 (68.9)	20.8 (69.4)	21.3 (70.3)	21.9 (71.4)	22.2 (72.0)	22.4 (72.3)	21.7 (71.1)
Average rainfall mm (inches)	318 (12.5)	284 (11.2)	253 (10.0)	103 (4.1)	71 (2.8)	30 (1.2)	29 (1.1)	13 (0.5)	8 (0.3)	19 (0.7)	80 (3.1)	191 (7.5)	1,399 (55)
Source: Climate-Data.org

== Tourism ==
- Gedong Kirtya (palm leaf library)
- Buleleng Harbor (natural harbor since the VOC era).
- Penglatan Village, Buleleng, Buleleng (center for making traditional food Dodol Bali).
- Penimbangan Beach (culinary tourist spot on the beach with various choices and classes of restaurants).
- Lovina Beach (beautiful beach tourist spot, to see dolphins in their natural habitat).
- Bung Karno Park (Bung Karno Park Green Open Space equipped with a stage located in Sukasada Village, Singaraja)

== Notable people ==
- I Ketut Gedé, painter
- Jero Wacik, politician
- Pandji Tisna, writer, king Buleleng
- Putu Oka Sukanta, writer

== Sister cities ==
Singaraja has the following sister cities:

- Bacolod, Philippines
- Andong, South Korea
- Sungai Petani, Malaysia
