= Produksi Film Negara =

Indonesian film production company

Perum Produksi Film Negara
- Logo used as of 2014

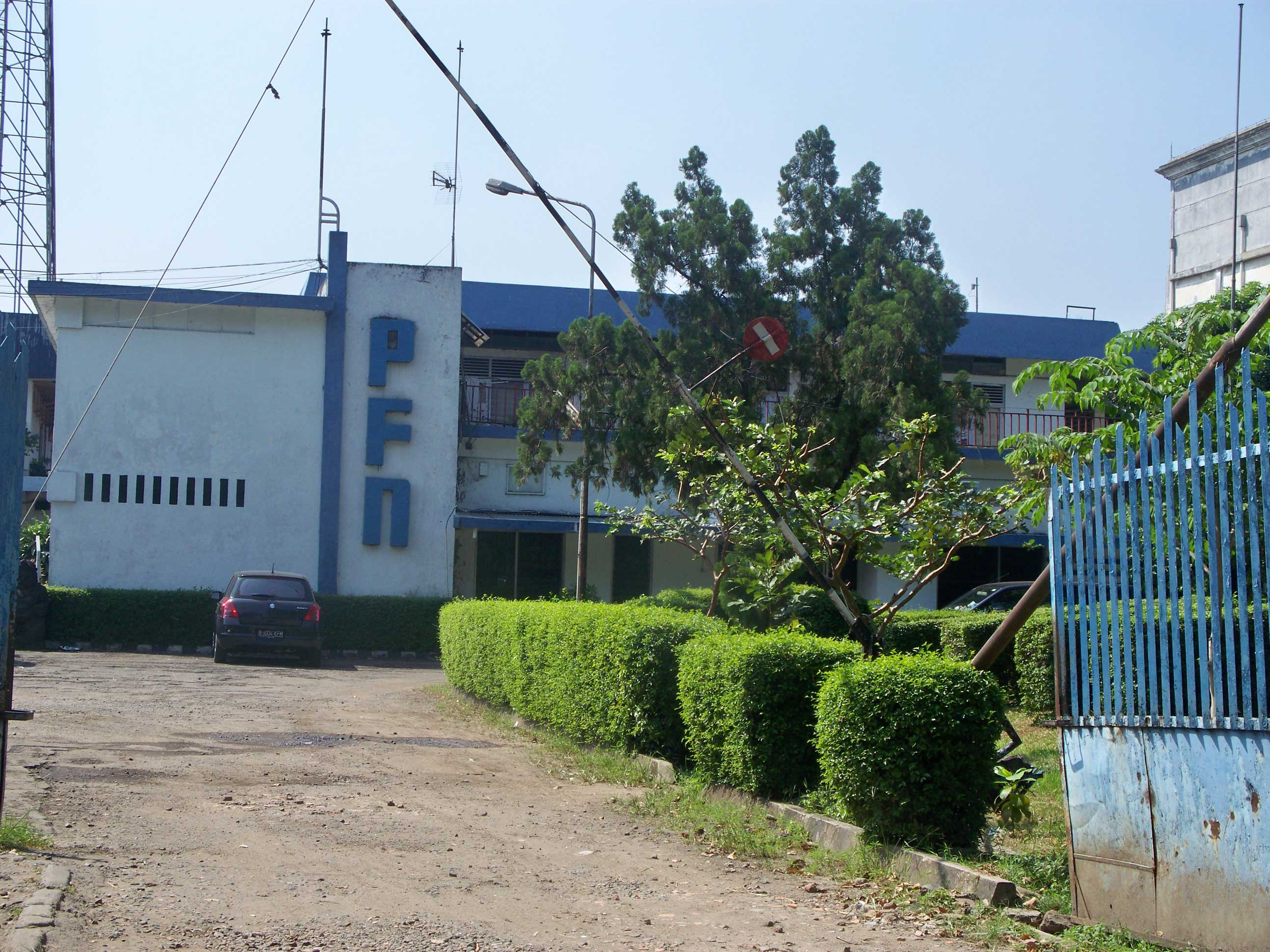
- PFN studios in Jakarta, in or before 2012
- Formerly: State Film Production Center of the Department of Information (1975–1988)
- Type: Statutory corporation (conversion to perseroan terbatas pending (Note: A Government Regulation has been issued in early August 2023 to convert PFN into a perseroan terbatas. However, the conversion is yet to be executed as the corporation still as of September 2023 refer to its supervisory board as such (Dewan Pengawas; instead of "Board of Commissioners" (Dewan Komisaris) used in perseroan terbatas)))
- Industry: Film industry
- Predecessors: Java Pacific Film (1934–1936); Algemeene Nederlands Indiesche Film (ANIF) (1936–1942); Nippon Eigasha Djakarta Branch (1942–1945); Berita Film Indonesia
- Founded: 6 October 1945
- Headquarters: Jakarta, Indonesia
- Area served: Film finance
- Owner: Government of Indonesia
- Website: pfn.co.id

Produksi Film Negara (lit. 'State Film Productions', abbreviated as PFN) is an Indonesian state-owned film funding company, previously a film production company. PFN is one of the pioneers in Indonesian film industry at the time when it is formed.

PFN started as Java Pacific Film (JPF) which founded by Albert Balink in Batavia. JPF undergo several name changes before finally become PFN in 1975.

== Film library ==
=== Lists of films ===
As Java Pacific Film

- Pareh (1935)

As ANIF

- Terang Boelan (1937)

As PPFN/PFN

- Antara Bumi dan Langit (1950)
- Inspektur Rachman (1950)
- Untuk Sang Merah-Putih (1950)
- Djiwa Pemuda (1951)
- Rakjat Memilih (1951)
- Si Pintjang (1951)
- Penjelundup (1952)
- Sekuntum Bunga Ditepi Danau (1952)
- Mardi dan Keranya (1952)
- Sajap Memanggil (1952)
- Meratjun Sukma (1953)
- Belenggu Masjarakat (1953)
- Kopral Djono (1954)
- Kembali ke Masjarakat (1954)
- Si Melati (1954)
- Antara Tugas dan Tjinta (1954)
- Merapi (1954)
- Peristiwa Didanau Toba (1955)
- Djajaprana (1955)
- Rajuan Alam (1956)
- Tiga-Nol (1958)
- Ni Gowok (1958)
- Lajang-Lajangku Putus (1958)
- Kantjil Mentjuri Mentimun (1959)
- Daun Emas (1963)
- Kelabang Hitam (1977)
- Warok (1978)
- Si Pincang (1979)
- Yuyun Pasien Rumah Sakit Jiwa (1979)
- Harmonikaku (1979)
- Sinila (Peristiwa Gunung Dieng) (1979)
- Cita Pertiwi (1980)
- Si Gura-gura (1980)
- Laki-laki dari Nusakambangan (1980)
- Orang-Orang Laut (1980)
- Juara Cilik (1980)
- Hadiah Buat Si Koko (1980)
- Serangan Fajar (1981)
- Kereta Api Terakhir (1981)
- Dia yang Kembali (1982)
- Senja Masih Cerah (1982)
- Penumpasan Pengkhianatan G 30 S PKI (1982)
- Djakarta 1966 (1982)
- Film dan Peristiwa (1985)
- Penumpasan Sisa-sisa PKI Blitar Selatan (Operasi Trisula) (1986)
- Surat untuk Bidadari (1992)
- Pelangi di Nusa Laut (1992)
- Kuambil Lagi Hatiku (2019)

=== Film series and franchises ===
- Si Unyil (1981–1993, 2002–2003)
- Si Huma (1983)
