= Serangan Fajar =

1982 film by Arifin C. Noer

- Promotional flyer
- Directed by: Arifin C. Noer
- Written by: Syafnizal Durab; Arto Hady
- Produced by: G. Dwipayana
- Starring: Antonius Yacobus; Dani Marsuni; Dicky Zulkarnaen; Suparmi
- Production company: PPFN
- Release date: 1982 (Indonesia)
- Running time: 120 minutes
- Country: Indonesia
- Language: Indonesian

Serangan Fajar (released internationally as Attack at Dawn) is a 1982 Indonesian war film directed by Arifin C. Noer and produced by G. Dwipayana. Telling the lives of several persons during the Indonesian National Revolution, the film used wayang imagery to show heroism. The critically acclaimed film has been read as emphasising then-President Suharto's role in the revolution, especially the General Offensive of 1 March.

== Conclusion ==
After the Japanese occupation, the Indonesian people begun fighting for independence, culminating with the 1 March 1949 general attack on the Dutch-held capital at Yogyakarta, led by Suharto. Amidst this backdrop two families face their own, personal issues. Temon has lost his father and lives with his grandmother. Meanwhile, the nobleman Romo is fighting for the nascent republic, while his wife is concerned about their daughter's relationship with a commoner.

== Production ==
Serangan Fajar was directed by Arifin C. Noer and produced by Brigadier General G. Dwipayana of the state-run, Jakarta-based production house PPFN. Arifin wrote the script on his own and during production M Soleh Ruslani handled cinematography. The completed film was edited by Supandi, while Noer's brother Embie provided music. Antonius Yacobus starred as Suharto, Dani Marsuni as Temon, and Amoroso Katamsi as Romo. Other cast members included Noer's wife Jajang, Charlie Sahetapy, and Suparmi.

Serangan Fajar used traditional wayang imagery. Scholar of Indonesia Donald K. Emmerson suggests that this was to legitimise then-president Suharto and emphasise the story's heroism.

Three World War II Japanese aircraft replica were made for the purpose of this film. They were made to represent scenes of the first combat sortie of Indonesian Air Force on 29 July 1947. Those aircraft were two Yokosuka K5Y Cureng and Mitsubishi Ki-51 Guntei. Their frame were made from wood with aluminium skin. One of the Cureng were equipped with a Volkswagen engine so it can rotate its propeller.

== Release and reception ==
Serangan Fajar was released in 1982. Before release its length was trimmed to 120 minutes. Reviewing in 1991, the American visual anthropologist Karl G. Heider wrote that the film was a "mild hagiography" which redefined Suharto's role in the revolution, especially the General Attack of 1 March 1949. He compared it to the way the 1963 Hollywood film PT 109 portrayed then-President John F. Kennedy and redefined his role in the sinking.

In September 1998, four months after the fall of Suharto, Information Minister Yunus Yosfiah stated that the film was an attempt to manipulate history and create a cult with Suharto in the centre. Two other films, Janur Kuning (Yellow Coconut Leaves; 1980) and Pengkhianatan G30S/PKI (Treachery of G30S/PKI; 1984), were also affected by the decree. Janur Kuning portrayed Suharto as the hero behind the 1 March General Assault, while Pengkhianatan G30S/PKI emphasised the former president's role in stopping and destroying the 30 September Movement coup in 1965.

A 35 mm copy is stored at Sinematek Indonesia.

== Awards ==
Serangan Fajar was nominated for nine Citra Awards at the 1982 Indonesian Film Festival, winning six. It received a special award for Best Child Actor at the same ceremony.

Award	Year	Category	Recipient	Result
Indonesian Film Festival	1982	Best Picture	–	Won
Indonesian Film Festival	1982	Best Director	Arifin C. Noer	Won
Indonesian Film Festival	1982	Best Screenplay	Arifin C. Noer	Nominated
Indonesian Film Festival	1982	Child Actor	Dani Marsuni	Won
Indonesian Film Festival	1982	Best Original Story	–	Won
Indonesian Film Festival	1982	Best Supporting Actor	Amoroso Katamsi	Nominated
Indonesian Film Festival	1982	Best Supporting Actress	Suparmi	Won
Indonesian Film Festival	1982	Best Cinematography	M Soleh Ruslani	Nominated
Indonesian Film Festival	1982	Best Artistic Direction	Fred Wetik, Farraz Effendy, Nahaly	Won
Indonesian Film Festival	1982	Best Musical Direction	Embie C. Noer	Won

== Works cited ==
- Emmerson, Donald K (1999). Indonesia Beyond Suharto: Polity, Economy, Society, Transition. Armonk, N.Y.: M.E. Sharpe. ISBN 978-1-56324-889-4.
- Heider, Karl G (1991). Indonesian Cinema: National Culture on Screen. Honolulu: University of Hawaii Press. ISBN 978-0-8248-1367-3.
- "Janur Kuning". filmindonesia.or.id (in Indonesian). Jakarta: Konfidan Foundation. Archived from the original on 31 March 2014.
- "Kredit Serangan Fajar" [Credits for Serangan Fajar]. filmindonesia.or.id (in Indonesian). Jakarta: Konfidan Foundation. Archived from the original on 31 August 2014.
- "Penghargaan Serangan Fajar" [Awards for Serangan Fajar]. filmindonesia.or.id (in Indonesian). Jakarta: Konfidan Foundation. Archived from the original on 31 August 2014.
- "Pengkhianatan G-30-S PKI". filmindonesia.or.id (in Indonesian). Jakarta: Konfidan Foundation. Archived from the original on 25 October 2012.
- Rini K; Evan (30 September 2012). "Tokoh di Balik Penghentian Pemutaran Film G30S" [Persons Behind the Ceasing of Screenings of the G30S Film]. Tempo (in Indonesian). Archived from the original on 5 September 2019.
- "Serangan Fajar". filmindonesia.or.id (in Indonesian). Jakarta: Konfidan Foundation. Archived from the original on 31 March 2014.
