= Arifin C. Noer =

Indonesian film producer (1941–1995)

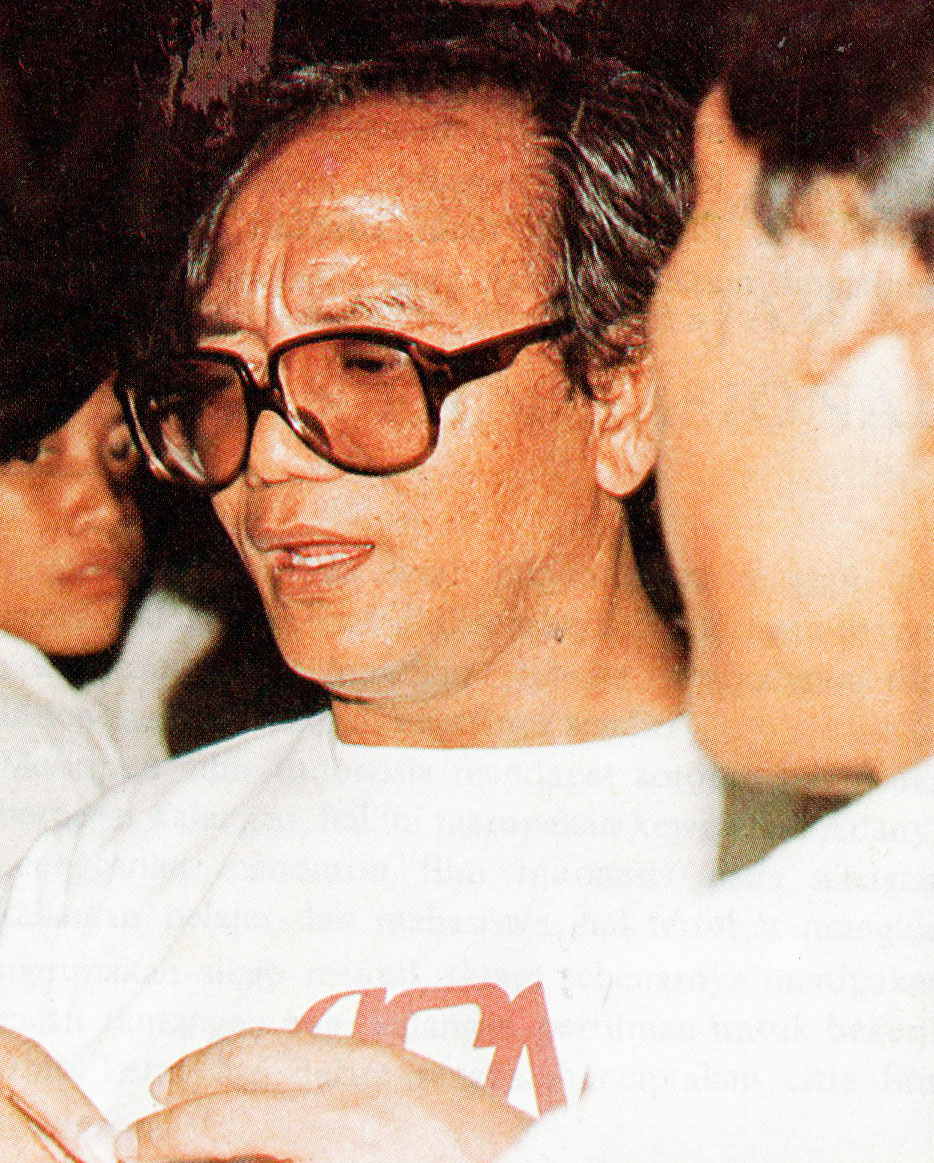
- Noer at the 1982 Indonesian Film Festival
- Born: Arifin Chairin Noer; 10 March 1941; Cirebon, Dutch East Indies
- Died: 28 May 1995 (aged 54); Jakarta, Indonesia
- Occupations: Writer, theatre director, film director
- Spouse: Jajang C. Noer
- Children: Nitta Nazyra, Marah Laut
- Writing career
- Language: Indonesian
- Genre: Poetry
- Notable works: Selamat Pagi Jajang (1979), Nyanyian Sepi (1995)
- Notable awards: S.E.A. Write Award 1990

Arifin Chairin Noer (10 March 1941 – 28 May 1995) was an Indonesian poet, theater director and film producer.

== Biography ==
He studied Civil Administration at Cokroaminoto University in Yogyakarta, Central Java and began his theatrical career in the early 1960s as an actor in a study group in Central Java with W.S. Rendra. After finishing his degree in 1967, he moved to Jakarta and founded Teater Kecil (Little Theater), a laboratory where he and other actors could experiment using the workshop model, emphasizing the whole person, as introduced by W.S. Rendra, but Noer was focused on the practical aspect of cultivating acting skills. According to the Columbia Encyclopedia of Modern Drama, he was a prolific playwright and director from the 1970s until his death in 1995, directing all of his original plays including his best-known work, Kapai-Kapai ("Reaching Out"; translated as "Moths" in English) in 1970.

His screenplays have won numerous awards, including Pemberang, which won the Golden Harvest trophy for Best Dialogue at the Film Festival Asia (FFA) in 1972, Rio Anakku (1973), Melawan Badai (1974), Pengkhianatan G30S/PKI (1984), and Taksi (1990) which received Citra awards at the Indonesian Film Festival (FFI). Translations of his plays have appeared in several languages, including English, French, Swedish and Chinese.

In 1972–73, he participated in the Iowa Writers' Workshop, an international writing program in the United States.

He received the S.E.A. Write Award in 1990. Two years later, his film Bibir Mer (Mer's Lips) was submitted for consideration as the Indonesian entry for the Academy Award for Best Foreign Language Film.

His most notable poetry works include Selamat Pagi Jajang (1979) and a collection of poetry published after his death, Nyanyian Sepi (1995).

== Selected written works ==
- Noer, Arifin (1966). Mega, mega : sandiwara tiga bagian. Pasar Minggu, Jakarta: Pustaka Firdaus. ISBN 979-541-118-7.
- Noer, Arifin (1992). The Bottomless Well : A Play in Four Acts. Jakarta: Lontar Foundation. ISBN 979-8083-10-5.
- Noer, Arifin (1995). Good Morning, Jajang. Singapore: Dept. of Malay Studies, National University of Singapore. ISBN 978-9971-62-387-6.
- Noer, Arifin (2000). Orkes madun, atawa, Madekur dan tarkeni; Umang-umang; Sandek pemuda pekerja; Ozone; Magma. Jakarta: Pustaka Firdaus. ISBN 979-541-119-5.
- Noer, Arifin C., ed. (2000). Ideologi teater modern kita. Yogyakarta: Pustaka Gondho Suli. ISBN 979-9443-00-8.

== Selected filmography ==
- Rio Anakku (Rio, My Child; 1973)
- Melawan Badai (Fighting the Storm; 1974)
- Suci Sang Primadona (Suci the Prima Donna; 1977)
- Petualang-Petualang (Wanderings; 1978)
- Yuyun Pasien Rumah Sakit Jiwa (Yuyun in the Mental Hospital; 1979)
- Harmonikaku (My Harmonica; 1979)
- Serangan Fajar (Dawn Attack; 1981)
- Djakarta 1966 (1982; released 1988)
- Pengkhianatan G30S/PKI – 1984
- Matahari Matahari (The Sun; 1985)
- Biarkan Bulan Itu (Let the Moon...; 1986)
- Taksi (Taxi; 1990)
- Bibir Mer (Mer's Lips; 1991)
- Tasi oh Tasi (1992)
