= Ariel Heryanto =

Indonesian humanities scholar

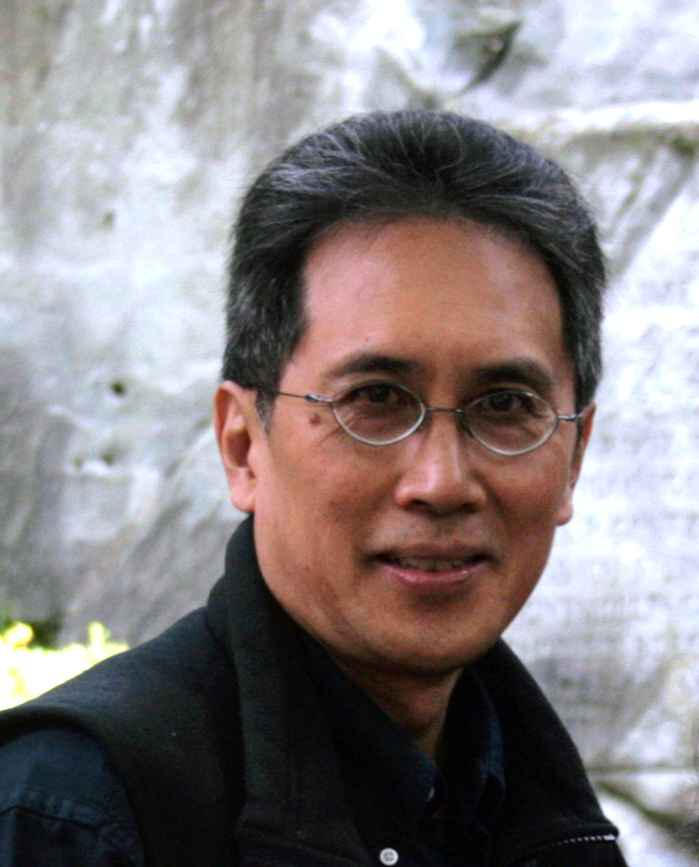
- Education: Monash University (PhD)
- Known for: Academic achievements
- Notable work: Identity and Pleasure: The Politics of Indonesian Screen Culture

Ariel Heryanto FAHA is an Indonesian scholar in the fields of cultural studies, media studies, and postcolonial studies. Now an Emeritus, he was previously Herb Feith Professor for the Study of Indonesia at Monash University, Australia, and serves as the deputy director of the Monash Asia Institute. Previously, Heryanto was the head of the Southeast Asia Centre in the Faculty of Asian Studies at the Australian National University. His academic career includes positions as a senior lecturer and head of the Indonesian Studies Program at the University of Melbourne, senior lecturer at the National University of Singapore, and postgraduate lecturer at Universitas Kristen Satya Wacana, Salatiga, Indonesia, Indonesia. Heryanto completed his bachelor's degree at Universitas Kristen Satya Wacana, obtained his MA in Asian studies from the University of Michigan, United States, and earned his PhD in cultural anthropology from Monash University. He was elected a Fellow of the Australian Academy of the Humanities in 2016.

== Publications ==
- Heryanto, Ariel (July 2014). Identity and Pleasure: The Politics of Indonesian Screen Culture. NUS Press. doi:10.2307/j.ctv1qv1rz. ISBN 978-9971-69-826-3. S2CID 142161423.
- Foulcher, Keith (2010). "State Terrorism and Political Identity in Indonesia: Fatally Belonging (review)". Sojourn. 25 (1): 139–142. doi:10.1355/SJ25-1G. Project MUSE 380082.
- Dragojlovic, Ana (November 2011). "Popular Culture in Indonesia, Fluid Identities in Post-Authoritarian Politics". The Asia Pacific Journal of Anthropology. 12 (5): 501–502. doi:10.1080/14442213.2011.624070. S2CID 145662801.
- Heryanto, Ariel; Shim, Doobo; Siriyuvasak, Ubonrat (2010). Pop Culture Formations Across East Asia. Jimoondang. ISBN 978-89-6297-026-5.
