= Putu Oka Sukanta =

Indonesian poet, writer, journalist

- Born: Putu Oka Sukanta; 29 July 1939 (age 87); Singaraja, Bali, Dutch East Indies
- Occupations: writer, journalist, practitioner
- Writing career
- Language: Indonesian
- Period: 1955–present
- Genres: poetry, novel, short story, children's story, nonfiction
- Subjects: Bali and others
- Notable work: Luh Galuh
- Notable awards: Hellmann/Hammett Grant Award (2012)
- Literary movement: 66

Putu Oka Sukanta (born 29 July 1939 in Singaraja, Bali, Indonesia) is a versatile Indonesian author of fiction and poetry. He wrote poetry, short stories and novels while still in Bali and after he moved to Yogyakarta and Jakarta. From 1966, during the New Order, he was imprisoned without trial as an alleged member of LEKRA. After his release in 1976, he has come to be known as a writer, journalist and an expert in the field of traditional medicine.

== Biography ==
Putu Oka Sukanta started writing at age 16. He actively wrote poetry, short stories, novels and children's stories while in his native Bali before moving to Yogyakarta and Jakarta. In 1966, in the crackdown following the 30 September Movement, he was imprisoned in Salemba in Jakarta as an alleged member of LEKRA. The years 1965 and ’66 were tumultuous ones in Indonesian history. A high school teacher, he had been dismissed from his job before his arrest. He spent the next 10 years behind bars with no idea of how long he would be there.

After his release in 1976, he continued to have difficulty publishing due to surveillance and censorship. Some of his texts were not available in Indonesia but in Germany and Australia, contributing to his reputation abroad but not at home.

In 1982 and 1983, Putu had an opportunity to attend the Popular Theatre Workshop in Sri Lanka and Bangladesh.

Some of his works are published in foreign languages. He is also a contributing editor and a senior staff member of an alternative magazines. They are also available in Indonesian Progressive Contemporary Poetry (Indonesia, 1963), The Prison Where I Live (London, 1996), Voice of Consciences (USA, 1995), Bali Behind The Seen (Australia, 1997), Black Cloud Over Paradise Isle (USA, 1997), Manageri IV (Indonesia, 1998), and Silenced Voices (Hawaii, 2000).

He is also the producer of many documentary films, one of which portrays the social impact of the tragic events of 1965 when hundreds of thousands of Indonesians fell victim to nationwide massacres.

Besides being known as a writer, he acquired expertise in the field of traditional medicine. During the time being captured in Salemba jail, Putu studied acupuncture and acupressure from a Chinese doctor who placed in the same cell. After his release from prison in 1978, he went to Taipei and Hong Kong to deepen the knowledge. In 1980, he established the Foundation for Traditional Medicine in Indonesia. He was married to Endah Lasmadiwati in 1987. In 1990, he was put back in jail due to his efforts to teach traditional medicine on the people suspected by the government. Throughout the New Order regime, he was never released from surveillance even while abroad. After his release from prison, Putu and his wife continued to gather herbs grown in Indonesia for their foundation. His expertise in acupuncture and herbs has taken him around the world in 23 countries. Now Putu Oka Sukanta to the Central Executive of the Association of Indonesian Naturopath Ikatan Naturopatis Indonesia. The Foundation facilitates to conduct research on traditional treatment methods for patients with HIV / AIDS. Some of his poems have been set to music by Indonesia's most prominent classical music composer of art song who is also an accomplished pianist, Ananda Sukarlan.

== Publications ==
- Putu Oka Sukanta Selat Balis ajak-sajak buat burung camar (collection of poetries Dwi Bahasa). Jakarta: Inkultra Foundation. 1982. OCLC 15196276.
- Putu Oka Sukanta Luh Galuh kumpulan cerita pendek(collection of short stories). Jakarta: Goethe-Inst. 1987. OCLC 21473151.
- Putu Oka Sukanta Tas kumpulan cerita pendek / Die Tasche (collection of short stories). Jakarta: Goethe-Institut. 1987. OCLC 21415477.
- Putu Oka Sukanta Tembok, matahari Berlin / Die Mauer, die Sonne Berlin (collection of shor poetries). Jakarta: Goethe-Institut. 1990. OCLC 24432299.
- Putu Oka Sukanta Keringat Mutiara (collection of shor stories). Jakarta: Yayasan Kalyanamitra, Pusat Komunikasi dan Informasi Perempuan. 1991. OCLC 27934692.
- Putu Oka Sukanta Kelakar Air, Air Berkelakar (novel). Jakarta. 1991. OCLC 66075187.
- Putu Oka Sukanta Teori dan praktek pijat akupungtur. Jakarta: Wahana Lingkungan Hidup Indonesia. 1991. OCLC 66130123.
- Putu Oka Sukanta Sari buah dan sayuran untuk kesehatan. Jakarta: Yayasan Sidowayah. 1993. OCLC 51597321.
- Putu Oka Sukanta Bersama menanggulangi PMS-HIV/AIDS : pengobatan alternatif. Jakarta: Yayasan Sidowayah, Ford Foundation. 1998. ISBN 9789799002099. OCLC 40331016.
- Putu Oka Sukanta Tembok, matahari Berlin / Die Mauer, die Sonne Berlin (collection of shor poetries). Jakarta: Goethe-Institut. 1999. OCLC 742438450.
- Putu Oka Sukanta Merajut Harkat (novel). Yogyakarta: Pustaka Pelajar bekerjasama dengan Jendela Budaya. 1999. ISBN 9789799075932. OCLC 42762291.
- Putu Oka Sukanta Kerlap-kerlip mozaik berjuang hidup dengan HIV (novel). Ford Foundation. 2000. ISBN 9789799341075. OCLC 47696900.
- Putu Oka Sukanta Di atas siang di bawah malam /sketsa perempuan & renungan seorang eks-tapol(novel). Jakarta: GagasMedia. 2004. ISBN 9789793600253. OCLC 58535802.
- Putu Oka Sukanta Rindu Terluka (collection of short stories). Jakarta: Metafor Pub. 2004. ISBN 9789793019222. OCLC 60590523.
- Putu Oka Sukanta Le voyage du poète : nouvelles et poèmes de l'intranquillité. Jakarta: L'École française d'Extrême-Orient. 2010. OCLC 800250312.
- Putu Oka Sukanta Tak 'kan melupakanmu : kumpulan cerita pendek (collection of short stories). Jakarta: Jaringan Kerja Kebudayaan Rakyat bekerja sama dengan Lembaga Kreatifitas Kemanusiaan (LKK). 2012. ISBN 9786021864920. OCLC 821841325.
- Putu Oka Sukanta Istana jiwa : langkah perempuan di celah aniaya : novel sejarah (novel). Jakarta: Jaringan Kerja Kebudayaan Rakyat bekerja sama dengan Lembaga Kreatifitas Kemanusiaan (LKK). 2012. ISBN 978-9791895095. OCLC 781432697.
