= Shamsi Ali =

Indonesian-American Islamic scholar (born 1967)

Imam Muhammad Shamsi Ali
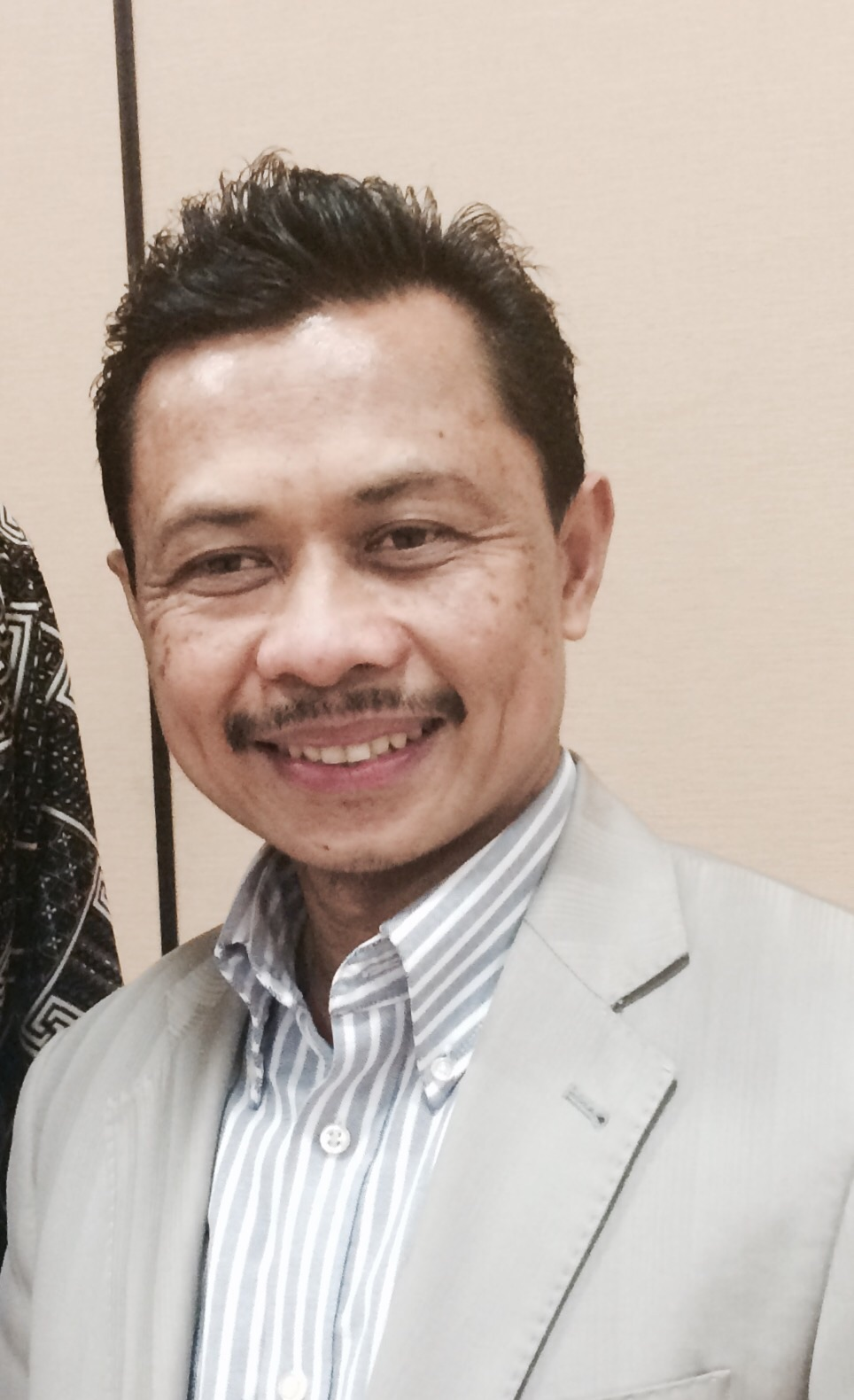
- Imam Shamsi Ali
- Born: Muhammad Utteng Ali; October 5, 1967 (age 58); Bulukumba, South Sulawesi, Indonesia
- Citizenship: Indonesian, American
- Occupations: Islamic scholar, Imam
- Known for: Interfaith dialogue
- Title: Imam
- Spouse: Mutiah
- Children: 6
- Parents: Ali Kadrun (father); Inong Tippangrom (mother)
- Awards: Ellis Island Medal of Honor; ICLI Interfaith Award; Turkish Cultural Center Friendship Award
- Website: www.shamsiali.com

Shamsi Ali (born Muhammad Utteng Ali) is a prominent Indonesian Islamic scholar known for promoting interfaith dialogues among Abrahamic religions in United States and the Chairman of the Al-Hikmah Mosque and the Director of Jamaica Muslim Center in Jamaica, Queens, New York City.

== Early life ==
Ali was born as Muhammad Utteng Ali in the village of Bulukumba in Kajang district of Bulukumba Regency in South Sulawesi, Indonesia on October 5, 1967. He is the third of six children (though only five survived into adulthood). His parents were a couple with farming background, Ali Kadrun (father) and Inong Tippangrom (mother).

His parents were not religious, but they wanted him to learn how to read the Koran, so they sent him to Daarul Arqam Islamic boarding school. During his childhood, Utteng (as he used to be called) was rebellious, lazy and often truant. He was one time detained for hitting a student named Mustafa, breaking his nose and sending him to the hospital. Mustafa's parents then called the police and they arrested him, though he was not entirely guilty. Finally Utteng was jailed for two weeks. Fortunately, he was not expelled from the boarding school due to the incident.

His name was changed from Utteng to Shamsi (an Arabic word which means Sun) when he and his father met with the Daarul Arqam school headmaster, Abdul Jabbar Asyiri. The headmaster argued that in Islam, the name is a prayer and should have a good sense, and he eventually renamed his middle name from Utteng to Shamsi with hope, Utteng could be the praiseworthy one (from his first name) and can illuminate (from his middle name, with the same way the sun does) people's hearts.

== Education ==
After completing primary school at age 12 in the village of Tana Toa in Bulukumba Regency, his parents sent him to Darul-Arqam pesantren (Islamic boarding school) in Makassar, which is owned by the Muhammadiyah organization. After graduating from the boarding school in 1987, Shamsi Ali stayed there as a teacher until the end of 1988.

He received a scholarship offer from Rabithah Alam Islami to study at the International Islamic University, Islamabad, Pakistan. He completed his undergraduate in Tafseer in 1992 and continued his master at the same university in the field of Comparative Religion in 1994. During his study in Pakistan, Shamsi Ali also worked as a lecturer at the school funded by Saudi Arabia, the Red Crescent Society in Islamabad, where later he received an offer to teach at the Islamic Education Foundation in Jeddah, Saudi Arabia in early 1995.

In 1996 Hajj season, Shamsi Ali got a mandate to speak at the Consulate General of Indonesia in Jeddah. From there, he met with some foreign hajj pilgrims, including the Indonesian Ambassador to the United Nations, Nugroho Wisnumurti, who once offered him to come to New York to build a new mosque for Indonesian community. Shamsi Ali accepted the offer and moved to New York in early 1997.

Ali earned Ph.D. in political science from University of Southern California in 2003. Besides Indonesian as his Native Language and Buginese language as his mother-tongue, Ali is also fluent in Arabic, English, and Urdu.

== Career ==
During his study in Islamabad, he was hired as a muezzin in Faisal Mosque, the biggest mosque in the city. He saved money to fund his hajj (pilgrimage) and wedding.

After arriving in New York in 1996, he served as an imam to an Indonesian community mosque in Long Island City, Queens. Through funding from the Indonesian Mission to the UN, Bank of Indonesia and the Indonesian consulate of New York, the community purchased a chemical warehouse for $350,000 on the 31st Street and 48th Avenue in Astoria, Queens. In 2001, he was appointed as deputy Imam of Islamic Cultural Center of New York which is the city's largest mosque located in 96th street and 3rd Ave in Manhattan, but left the position in 2011.

Shamsi Ali is also the chairman of the board of trustees for the ASEAN Muslim Federation of North America. He also serves as the vice president of the Asian-American Coalition USA (AAC-USA) and its UN representative and as an advisory board member to numerous interfaith organizations, including the Tanenbaum Center and Federation for Middle East Peace.

In interfaith organizations, Imam Ali serves as a board member for the Partnership of Faith in NY, and co-founder of the UNCC (Universal Clergy Coalition-International). Furthermore, he is also assistant director and a board member of the Muslim Foundation of America, Inc., and chairman of the annual Muslim Day Parade in NYC.

A few days after the events of 11 September 2001, New York City chose him to represent the Muslim community to visit the scene, where he met President George W. Bush. He also recited a prayer at the memorial service for the September 11th victims at Yankee stadium in the Bronx.

In 2002, Ali was appointed "Ambassador for Peace" by the International Religious Federation, and a recipient of ICLI Interfaith Award in 2008. Ali was chosen as one of the seven most influential religious leaders in New York City by New York Magazine in 2006.

He represented the Muslim community at an interfaith discussion on Religions and Sustainable Development in the White House 2007, and took part in the Transatlantic Interfaith Dialogue in Frankfurt, Germany 2008.

Within the Indonesian Muslim community in North America, he serves as an advisory board to major national Muslim organizations such as IMSA (Indonesian Muslim Society in America) and ICMI (Indonesian Muslim Intellectual Society in America). He is also the president of Nusantara Foundation, a community based operating and non-profit organization in New York that is established, publicly supported, operated by, and for the benefit of Indonesian culture.

== Controversy ==
Shamsi Ali was accused by some people of Islamic Cultural Center of New York of misconduct during his time as the Imam. Furthermore, some congregations disagreed with his "liberal" approaches, especially his interfaith activities which they said were controversial. Other people at the mosque accused him not to do good in the wider community, but instead he went out and made friends with Mayor Michael Bloomberg and Police Commissioner Kelly. Some people then refused to attend Ali's prayers. His teachings about how to lead a modern Islamic life in a Western society infuriated some congregants.

One of scholars in South Africa even issued a fatwa, cautioning Muslims against performing prayers led by Ali. Ali left his position at ICC of New York (the management at ICC insisted that he was fired) in 2011. He continues his position as the director of the Jamaica Muslim Center in Jamaica, Queens since 2004 and as the chairman of Al-Hikmah mosque since 1996.

In September 2015 Ali sharply criticized Chairman of the DPR of Indonesia, Setya Novanto and its Deputy Speaker Fadli Zon for attending Donald Trump's press conference. Shamsi said the meeting had humiliated Indonesian state leaders and was full of political interests. He said it was obvious that the press conference was part of a campaign event. He further said the presence of Setya and Fadli, who stood behind Trump as the US business tycoon delivered a speech, was deplorable. In addition, according to Imam Shamsi Ali, Donald Trump is known for his racist and anti-immigrant comments, including the anti-Muslim sentiments.

== Writings and publications ==
Ali has written many articles, given speeches and initiated dialogues with various religious leaders about the importance of dialogues among Muslims, Christians, Jews and other religious groups toward peace. He has made countless appearances on TV (ABC, PBS, BBC World, CNN, Fox News, National Geographic, al-Jazeera, the Hallmark Channel) to condemn terrorism, radicalism, anti-Semitism and to promote peaceful Islam.

Ali has authored four books: Dai muda di New York City (A Young Dai in New York City), The True Love in America; 29 Kisah Mualaf Amerika (The True Love in America: 29 stories of Muallaf in America), Menebar Damai di Bumi Barat (Spreading Peace in Western World). The former US president Bill Clinton gave a foreword to his fourth book, a memoir, entitled Sons Of Abraham: A Candid Conversation about the Issues That Divide and Unite Jews and Muslims which he co-authored with Marc Schneier, a Jewish rabbi who is also his close friend.

== Recognition ==
Imam Ali was appointed "Ambassador for Peace" by the International Religious Federation in 2002, and a recipient of the 2008 ICLI Interfaith Award. In 2006, he was named one of seven most influential religious leaders in New York City by New York Magazine. He is also one of 100 recipients of the 2009 Ellis Island Medal of Honor Award. This prestigious non-military gold medal is one of the highest awards recognized by US government to native-born and naturalized U.S. citizens with tremendous contributions to the American society and the world and for Shamsi Ali it was due to his work in building bridges between religious communities.

On September 18, 2010, Ali was granted Hall of Fame Award by AACUSA (Asian American Coalition USA) Inc. The award honored Ali as one of the seven outstanding individuals within their respective Asian communities. According to the AACUSA, Dr. Parveen C. Chopra, Shamsi Ali has reached across the division and became part of the Muslims’ voice at the United Nations forums, churches, synagogues, the NYPD, FBI and major news outlets including, ABC, PBS, BBC World, CNN, Fox News, National Geographic, Al-Jazeera and the Hallmark Channel.

He was also chosen as one of The 500 Most Influential Muslims in the world in 2009, 2010, and 2011 by the Royal Islamic Strategic Studies Center in Jordan and Georgetown University.

In April 2014, NY senate commended him to be the recipient of Turkish Cultural Center's Friendship Award, which he received along with Rabbi Marc Schneier during the ceremony on April 10, 2014, at the Turkish Cultural Center of Queens.

== Personal life ==
Unlike many imams in United States, Ali likes and listens to rap and hip-hop music such as songs produced by hip-hop mogul Russell Simmons. Some people call him "Hip Imam".

Shamsi Ali lives with his wife (Mutiah Malik), four sons (Utsman, Adnan, Shakeel, Ayman) and two daughters (Maryam, Malika).
