= Emmy Saelan =

Indonesian independence fighter and nurse

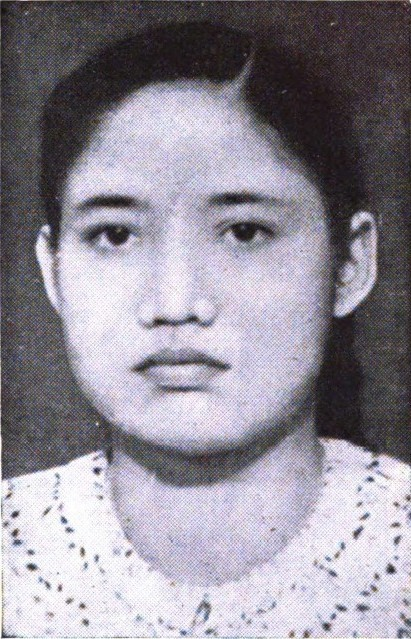
- Emmy Saelan in unknown year
- Born: Salmah Soehartini Saelan; 15 October 1924; Makassar, Dutch East Indies
- Died: 21 January 1947 (aged 22) near Kassi-Kassi, Indonesia
- Other name: Daeng Kebo
- Occupation: Nurse
- Parents: Amin Saelan (father); Sukamtin (mother)
- Relatives: Maulwi Saelan (brother)
- Military career
- Allegiance: Indonesia
- Service years: 1945 - 1947
- Unit: Indonesian People's Rebel Army of Sulawesi
- Conflicts: Indonesian National Revolution: South Sulawesi campaign

Salmah Soehartini Saelan, also known as Emmy Saelan (15 October 1924 - 21 January 1947), was an Indonesian independence fighter and nurse who fought against the Dutch. She was the first Indonesian female fallen fighter during the revolution.

== Early life and education ==
Salmah Soehartini Saelan was born in Makassar on 15 October 1924 to Amin Saelan and Sukamtin. His father worked as a civil servant. During her childhood, she spoke Dutch in daily life. She studied at ELS after being rejected from HIS since her father was not a high-ranking civil servant. Afterwards, she continued her studies at Zuster School and graduated in 1937. Upon completing her basic education, she continued studying at HBS. As an HBS student, she was the oldest pupil and was known for her intelligence. When Japan successfully defeated the Dutch in March 1942, Saelan was a fourth-grade student at HBS.

In Mid-1942, Japan closed all Dutch-style schools and Taman Siswa in Makassar. Hearing this decision, Amin Saelan decided to enroll her in a Japanese high school, Chugakko. As she approached graduation, she wanted to be a pediatrician and proposed to the Japanese occupation government to allow her to study medicine in Java, but they rejected her proposal, citing that a medical school was available in Makassar. After graduating from high school in 1943, she studied medicine at Stella Maris Hospital, where the studies were conducted in Japanese. She finished her medical education in 1945.

== Indonesia National Revolution ==
=== Nurse career ===
Upon finishing his medical education, she worked as a nurse at Stella Maris Hospital in 1945. At that time, Indonesia proclaimed its independence and later, the allied forces landed in Makassar, causing clashes with the youth militia. She often provided medicines, food, and clothes to the fighters. Furthermore, she founded a school named Perguruan Nasional (National College). In the school, she met Wolter Monginsidi, who later became her companion when waging guerrilla war against the Dutch. On 5 April 1946, the Dutch arrested Sulwesi Governor Sam Ratulangi, and Saelan protested it by going on strike. Responding to the participation in the strike, the hospital monitored her, and she was transferred to the consultation bureau as a chest checker.

=== Military career ===
Saelan began her involvement in armed resistance when the Dutch arrested Manai Sophiaan in October 1945. Responding to this incident, the Macassan youth militia planned an operation to free Manai Sophiaan, where she and her brother arranged the attack tactics. The operation failed, and the Dutch arrested Maulwi while failing to capture Emmy.

In July 1946, Saelan resigned from her job as a nurse. Together with Maulwi, she moved from Makassar to Polongbangkeng by bringing medicines and arrived in the same month. Upon arriving in Polongbangkeng, she joined the Lipang Badjeng militia as its sole female member and began waging guerrilla warfare against the Dutch. Additionally, she also joined the Indonesian People's Rebel Army of Sulawesi (Lapris) under the command of Ranggong Daeng Romo and was assigned to its medical department. During the guerrilla war, she was known as a cryptologist and always accompanied Mongisidi when he got a patrol duty. She also joined Lapris special forces, Harimau Indonesia, where she served as the head of the women's wing and the medical department. As a member of Harimau Indonesia, she used a pseudonym of Daeng Kebo because of her white skin.

KNIL attacked the Lapris base in Polongbangkeng on 8 August 1946, forcing them to retreat to the forest. Responding to the defeat, Saelan fled to Anak Bajeng. However, some of her colleagues raised concerns about the presence of Saelan due to her gender. They asked Monginsidi to move her to Makassar, a request that he and she accepted. Arriving in Makassar, she established contact with Loyalty of the Indonesian People from Sulawesi (KRIS) in Makassar through its representative, Hasan Thahir, and persuaded Monginsidi to join its board, an offer that he rejected. Emmy and Maulwi participated in the Battle of Limbung on 24 October 1946, where their forces were able to capture the police station, seize the weapons, and burn the government offices. Apart from that, she and Mongisidi managed to escape from KNIL's raid by hiding in a people's house. She also assisted in the escape of a person, Musa, whom KNIL arrested on 3 November 1946.

=== Death ===
On 21 January 1947, KNIL forces attacked Tidung, where the militia headquarters were located. Emmy fought against KNIL together with Mongisidi and the rest of 83 fighters. During the attack, many fighters died and were injured, prompting Mongisidi to ask her to retreat and bring the wounded militias to Kassi-Kassi. She accepted his request and went to Kassi-Kassi with her colleague. On the way, they encountered KNIL soldiers, and a clash ensued. Outnumbered, her forces were on the verge of being defeated. KNIL persuaded Saelan to surrender, but she rejected the offer. The soldiers then approached her and she exploded the hand grenades, killing her and eight other KNIL Soldiers. She was buried in Panaikang Heroes' Cemetery.

== Personal life ==
Saelan was the first child of eight siblings. Her brother, Maulwi Saelan, was a footballer and military officer who served in Soekarno's bodyguard Tjakrabirawa. Unlike many girls, she was fond of wearing men's clothes.

== Legacies ==
The government constructed the monument to honor Saelan's contribution to the revolution in 1972 and renovated it in 1985. Moreover, her name was used for street in almost all regencies and cities in South Sulawesi.

== Bibliography ==
- Bahri, Bahri; Bustan, Bustan; Tati, Andi Dewi Riang (2019). "EMMY SAELAN: PERAWAT YANG BERJUANG" [Emmy Saelan: warrior nurse]. Al-Qalam (in Indonesian). 25 (3).
- Mawar, Irmawati Puan (2018). Emmy Saelan Perempuan di Palagan. Jakarta: Agency for Language Development and Cultivation.
- Saelan, Maulwi (2008). Dari Revolusi 45 sampai Kudeta 66: Kesaksian Wakil Komandan Tjakrabirawa. Jakarta: Gramedia Pustaka Utama.
