= Dompea =

Pro-government militia in Indonesia

- Leader: Amma Lolo †
- Founded: 1954
- Dates active: 1954–1957
- Allegiance: Republic of Indonesia
- Headquarters: Tana Toa
- Active regions: Southern Sulawesi; Bulukumba Regency; Kajang District
- Wars: South Sulawesi insurgency

Dompea or Dompe was a pro-government militia active in the South Sulawesi region during the Darul Islam rebellion against the rebels.

== History ==
When the Darul Islam movement invaded the Bulukumba Regency regency in 1953, they imposed a strict version of the Sharia law on local population. The Kajang people were specifically singled out due to their adherence to local pre-Islamic beliefs in spirits. In response, in 1954 a militia was formed called Dompea to kick out the Islamic rebels out of the region. Their members were wearing all-black clothes and headbands called "passapu' le'leng" and were armed with badik knives as well as sharpened bamboo sticks.

The leader of the rebellion, self-proclaimed "Amma Lolo" began recruiting fighters from areas as far north as Tanete and as far south as Ara. In 1955 the militia launched an attack on Darul Islam, they would cut throats of the Darul Islam fighters eventually reaching the village of Bira in the south. Over the course of six months the movement has spread to Sinjai, Bulukumba, Bantaeng and Takalar regencies. The self-proclaimed army attacked mosques forbidding people from praying in them and eventually managed to kick all Darul Islam fighters out of the region by 1956.

In 1957 however Darul Islam rebels launched a counteroffensive against the Dompea fighters. They first clashed at Panremo in Bonto Tanga with multiple casualties at both sides. They then clashed at Mount Lembang Gogoso in Sinjai where Islamis fighters armed with machine guns managed to defeat the militiamen who were armed with spears, killing multiple men, women and children including Amma Lolo.

Darul Islam rebels imposed then collective punishment on the Kajang people, razing to the ground tribal villages, forbidding tribal cults, executing some Kajang people as well as isolated the community by blowing up bridges and cutting down telephone wires.
