= PKRS =

PKRS or PKRs can refer to:

- Pakistani rupees, the currency of Pakistan
- Password Authenticated Key Retrieval Scheme, a type of password-based public-key cryptography. See IEEE P1363.
- Pusat Keamanan Rakyat Sementara (literally Temporary Center for People's Safety), an organisation led by Andi Abdullah Bau Massepe in support of Indonesian independence
- Pertahanan Keamanan Rakyat Semesta (translated as "Universal People's Defense and Security" or "Nation in Arms"), a system similar to conscription in Indonesia

== See also ==
- PKR (disambiguation)
