= Ranggong Daeng Romo =

Indonesian National Hero

- Born: c. 1914-1915; Bonebone, Moncongkomba, Takalar, Dutch East Indies
- Died: 27 February 1947 (aged 31-33); Lengkese, Indonesia
- Children: 4
- Military career
- Allegiance: Indonesia (1945-1947)
- Branch: Indonesian People's Rebel Army of Sulawesi
- Service years: 1945-1947
- Conflicts: Indonesian National Revolution: South Sulawesi campaign of 1946–1947 †

Ranggong Daeng Romo (born c. 1914-1915 - 27 February 1947) was an Indonesian independence fighter and bureaucrat. He was awarded the title of National Hero in 2001.

== Early life and education ==
Ranggong was born c. 1914-1915 in Bonebone to a local noble family. His father's name was Gallarang Moncokomba Mangngulabbe Daeng Makkio, and his mother was Bati Daeng Jimo. He was the first of six children. He first enrolled at the Cikoang Islamic Boarding School, where he learned basic Islamic knowledge, quran, and sufism. In 1922, he studied at Indlande School in Takalar. Afterward, his parents schooled him at Hollandsch-Inlandsche School (HIS) Makassar in 1929. While studying at HIS, he disliked the Dutch students, whom he considered arrogant, and often quarreled with them. As a result, he moved to Taman Siswa after persuading his parents. As a Taman Siswa student, he often faced insults from Dutch students from HIS, and he responded by fighting them, which often caused damage to the school. His actions toward Dutch school students led the Political Intelligence Service (PID) to call his parents. Subsequently, they withdrew him from Taman Siswa and took him to Takalar.

== Employee career ==
After finishing school, Ranggong returned to Takalar and worked as the District Head of Bontokadatto. While working at the district office, he deepened his Islamic knowledge by reading religious books and learned politics and economics. He also worked as a farmer, managing his rice fields and raising livestock. Meanwhile, he joined the Islamic organization Muhammadiyah and invited his subjects to join it to uphold Islamic teachings and curb the Christianization process.

During the Japanese occupation era, Ranggong worked at a Japanese food and cloth distribution company named Nanijo Kuhatsu Kabusiki Kaisha from 1943 to 1944. He stated that his purpose in working at the Japanese company was to protect the locals from the Japanese occupiers' cruelty. He also followed the news updates of World War II in the Europe and Pacific and subscribed to national newspapers. By following the course of World War II, he predicted that Japan would surrender to the Allies and that the Allies would hand Indonesia back to the Dutch. As a result, he ordered his colleagues to seize Japanese soldiers' weapons from those who visited villages and hide them, which he first did on 26 June 1945 in Bontokadatto. Furthermore, he spied on the Japanese soldiers stationed in Bontoparang and Panjo'jo to discover the weapon storage locations.

== Military career ==
Ranggong received the proclamation on 19 August 1945. On 16 October 1945, he joined the Bajeng Youth Movement and was appointed as the group's commander in Moncongkomba. He then served as commander of the Bajeng Youth Movement assault unit and concurrently held the position of the group's leader in Ko'mara on 5 December. Ranggong became the commander of the Bajeng Youth Movement assault unit for the Polombangkeng region on 27 February 1946. Two months later, on 2 April, he served as Chairman of Lipang Badjeng. As the commander, he led the group's assault on Royal Netherlands East Indies Army (KNIL) posts in Takalar and managed to repel the enemy's attack on 22 February. On 1 March, his troops attacked KNIL truck patrols in Parrisi, killing 20 soldiers.

=== Commander of LAPRIS ===
To fight the Dutch, who wanted to reestablish their rule in South Sulawesi, pro-Indonesian guerrilla fighters from Makassar initiated the establishment of a South Sulawesi guerrilla umbrella organization. Some Makassar guerrillas reached Polombangkeng and met Ranggong, asking him to establish the guerrilla organization. However, he decided to establish the organization after hearing van Mook's plan to hold the Malino Conference. He ordered his assistants to meet the guerrilla leaders in the town and countryside and invite them to a meeting in Ko'mara. Five South Sulawesi guerrilla groups accepted the offer and sent their delegates to Ko'mara.

On 15 July 1946, Ranggong attended the meeting in Ko'mara with delegates from five South Sulawesi guerrilla groups, and they agreed to establish the umbrella organization for guerrilla groups. On the following day, he attended another meeting in Ko'mara. The meeting lasted until 17 July at 03:00, and the attendees agreed to establish an umbrella organization named Indonesian People's Rebel Army of Sulawesi (LAPRIS), consisting of 19 different guerrilla groups, and inaugurated it at 09:00. After the inauguration of LAPRIS, Ranggong was appointed as the Commander of LAPRIS. On 27 September 1946, he was elected as a member of the LAPRIS headquarters staff.

After Ranggong became commander of LAPRIS, his first action was to create the group's special and traditional forces, which fought on the front lines. He motivated his fighters to uphold the truth of Islamic teachings, leading Robert Wolter Mongisidi to express his desire to convert to Islam. He also created LAPRIS special and traditional forces. On 8 August, KNIL soldiers attacked the LAPRIS base in Rana Tinggi, Ko'mara, and he moved it to Lembaya, Ko'mara. He initiated a one-month military training for LAPRIS members in Maniailing, Ko'mara, held from 4 October to 4 November, and he served as the leader. Furthermore, he instructed his troops and LAPRIS leader to attack Takalar and appointed Robert Wolter Mongisidi to lead the group's assault on the town because of his experience in urban warfare. From 4 to 7 November 1946, he led the group's attack on the Dutch military posts in Malino, Halakaji, Pappa, Paririsi, and Takalar after sabotaging the telephone lines and infrastructure. He also established cooperation between LAPRIS and the Sulawesi Preparatory Unit of the Army of the Republic of Indonesia (TRIPS).

Because of the group's intense attack towards the KNIL, the Dutch sent Raymond Westerling to Southern Sulawesi to quell the pro-Indonesian militias. His troops committed numerous atrocities against civilians in Makassar and its outskirts. Responding to this cruelty, Ranggong planned an attack in Makassar with TRIPS. Although his plan received opposition from Lipan Bajeng and Laptur B. Bangkala, the plan was accepted. He appointed Mongisidi to lead the Makassar attack and sent Emmy Saelan and Sangkala Tinggi to Makassar to gather intelligence. He chose Emmy because she was a woman and knew Makassar well. However, the Makassar attack plan failed when the KNIL attacked the LAPRIS position, captured Mongisidi, and killed Saelan.

Responding to the failure of the Makassar attack plan, Ranggong decided to move the group's defensive position from Lengkese and strengthen the defense posts. Suddenly, the KNIL launched an attack on the LAPRIS base from the cliff on 27 February 1947, causing disorganization among LAPRIS militias. KNIL Soldiers shot him in the thigh, and he felt down. One LAPRIS member, Muh. Djalal Daeng Leo, saw Ranggong wounded and wanted to evacuate him. However, he refused and threatened to shoot Leo if he refused to flee. Afterward, Leo fled, and Ranggong leaned against a rock, pretending to be dead. When KNIL personnel approached him, he inched forward and shot them with a pistol. He managed to kill three and injure five soldiers. Hearing gunfire, a KNIL soldier approached Ranggong and killed him. From his appointment as the commander until his death, he led 51 LAPRIS attacks against the KNIL. After his death, Mappa Daeng Temba became the Commander of LAPRIS.

Ranggong was buried in Bakkara Cemetery on 28 February 1947. Because of his service, he was reburied in Sabang-Merauke Hero Cemetery on 11 December 1962. In 2023, he was buried in Kale Ko'mara.

== Personal life and legacy ==
Ranggong married his cousin, Putri Terasi Daeng Bantang, at the age of 22. The couple had four children. On 3 November 2001, the Indonesian government granted him national hero status. His name was immortalized as street name in Makassar and as high school name in Pattallassang. In 1999, the regencial government of Takalar inaugurated Ranggeng's statue in Taman Kita, Pattallassang.

== Bibliographies ==
- Bahtiar, Bahtiar; Amir, Muhammad; Kila, Syahrir (2019). Dinamika kemiliteran: dari Kelaskaran hingga Batalyon 710 di Sulawesi Selatan (PDF). Makassar: UPT UNHAS Press.
- Satriani, Satriani (1991). KISSAH PERJUANGAN RANGGONG DAENG ROMO 1945 - 1947 (PDF) (Bachelor thesis). Hasanuddin University.
