= Tana Toa =

- Village
- Location in Sulawesi
- Coordinates: 5.368647°S 120.318736°E
- Country: Indonesia
- Province: South Sulawesi
- Regency: Bulukumba Regency
- District: Kajang

Area
  - Total: 1,820 ha (4,500 acres)
- Highest elevation: 155 m (509 ft)
- Lowest elevation: 75 m (246 ft)

Population (2004)
  - Total: 3,900
  - Density: 210/km^{2} (550/sq mi)
- Time zone: WITA (UTC+08:00)
- Postal Code: 92574
- Area code: 0413

Tana Toa (sometimes spelled as Tanatoa, Tanah Toa, or Tanah Towa) is a village in the Kajang district, Bulukumba Regency in South Sulawesi, Indonesia. The village is located in the east coast of South Sulawesi, about 20 kilometres (12 mi) from town of Kajang, about 56 kilometres (35 mi) north of Bulukumba and 210 kilometres (130 mi) southeast of Makassar. The village is inhabited majority by the Kajang tribe. The village is famous throughout Makassar territory as the place of great mystical power.

== Geography ==
The village of Tana Toa has a very dense forest. Almost the entire village is surrounded by rainforests. There are no paved roads in the region, except paths made of stones arranged in a regular pattern as road markers. 90 ha of land used as a rain-fed agriculture. Plants are cultivated on an area that is quite diverse, including rice, corn, cocoa, coffee, and others. Rice fields are located at the bottom of the hill near the Amma Toa, The fertile paddy fields are visible from distance.

The village is bordered by village Tuli to the north, Limba village to the south, Seppa village to the east and Dor village to the west.

Tana Toa consists of hamlets:

1. Balagana
2. Jannayya
3. Bantalang
4. Pangi
5. Sobbu
6. Balambina
7. Benteng
8. Luraya
9. Tombolo

Out of the nine hamlets in Tana Toa, eight of them are in the traditional Ammatoa customs zone totally occupy area of about 998 hectares (2,470 acres) or more than 55% of the village total area, while Jannayya is not.

== Culture ==
The village is named Tana Toa (from local language meaning the oldest land in the world according to the customary beliefs of the villagers). People of Tana Toa believe that the earth was first created by God in a forest called Tombolo. The area was believed to be the oldest area in the world, so the villagers named the area as Tana Toa.

Geographically and administratively, Tana Toa is inhabited by Konjo people, a sub ethnic of Buginese. The indigenous people of Konjo divided into two sub-groups called Konjo Gunung (Mountain Konjo) and Konjo Pesisir (Coastal Konjo)., who speak the Highland and Coastal Konjo language. The Konjo Pegunungan (Mountain Konjo) primarily live in the mountainous region of Konjo, in the districts of Tinggimoncong, Gowa, Sinjai and Bone. The Konjo Pesisir people (also known as Tiro) live in the districts of Kajang, Herlang, Bonto Tiro and Bonto Bahari in the east area of the Bulukumba Regency. The Konjo Pesisir speak the Konjo language in several dialects, namely Tana Toa, Konjo Hitam and Kajang. The Konjo Hitam (Black Konjo) people, who are included among the Konjo Pesisir, occupy an area to the west of Kajang. These Konjo Hitam consider themselves the original inhabitants and regard their area as the center of traditional custom for all of the Konjo Pesisir. This Konjo Hitam tribe is also known as Kajang tribe.

Kajang tribe is divided into two groups, inner Kajang and Outer Kajang tribes. The traditional Inner Kajang tribe scatters in several villages, including the village of Tana Toa, Bonto Baji, Malleleng, Pattiroang, Batu Nilamung and some parts of Tambangan village. The Inner Kajang tribe lives in the area bordered with Tuli in the north, Limba in the east, Seppa in the South, and Doro in the west. While the Outer Kajang tribe population spreads throughout much of the Kajang District and in some villages in the Bulukumba Regency, such as Jojolo, Tibona, Bonto Minasa and Batu Lohe

However, only Inner Kajang tribe live in full customs of Ammatoa. The tribe are known for their motto Kamase-masea, or a simple living and reluctance to adopt many conveniences of modern technology. For them, technology objects can have negative impacts on their lives, because they undermine the sustainability of natural resources. The tribe people always wear black clothes, such as pants that almost touch knees, sarong, robe, and headband. These people also practice occultism as part of their animistic worship. They are referred to as the indigenous people of Kajang.

The simplicity is also applied to their residence. All houses in Tana Toa are stilt houses constructed and made of the same material made of wood with roofs of straw. All houses even face the same direction facing the west. The bathroom is located in front of the house and without doors.

Kajang people do not recognize social stratification, they assume men are all equal. They also assume that they are the oldest Konjo, and regard their territory as the Centrum of all descendants of the traditional Konjo people.

The word Ammatoa or Amma Toa is a Konjo word for Old Father. It means that the Kajang tribe is led by a Ammatoa figure (Tribal chief). A successful candidate to replace previous Ammatoa is chosen through a long and complicated process. The tribe believe that the chosen Ammatoa receives instructions from Turae Ra'na (God). He must also be able to recite a series of myths and genealogies flawlessly without ever having studied them. Ammatoa society hold the Patuntung belief, a belief for sustainability of forest ecosystems. The Ammatoa position is for life, and is replaced only when the incumbent dies.

The main source of life for Kajang tribe is agriculture and plantations. Most of the men working in farms or paddy fields during the day to meet the needs. When planting season arrives they flock to the fields that are located a few kilo-meters from their homes. They use horses as transportation to the rice fields and water buffaloes for plowing the fields. People who do not have farms or fields usually work for the owners of the fields. Women usually work at home weaving fabrics. They weave fabrics to be used to make black sarongs called Tope Le'leng. They also sell the woven fabrics to visitors as additional revenue.

== History ==
During the Darul Islam rebellion local Islamic commander tried to impose strict version of the Sharia law on the village, leading to its members forming a self-defense militia Dompea. The militia was eventually defeated in 1957 leading to forced suppression of some tribal religious practices during the occupation.

== Religion ==
Konjo people are 100% Muslims, but 75% of the people still retain animistic practice. Even the most devout Muslims fear of spirits and do whatever it takes to please these spirits. When there is a conflict between the teachings of Islam and their traditional practices, traditional practices will win. Most children learn to read the Koran and every ceremony is considered not complete without Koran recitation, even though they do not understand the meaning.

== Climate and ecology ==
The forest in Tana Toa is called Borong Karama (meaning Sacred Forest) with the area of 331.70 hectares (819.6 acres). Tana Toa is rich with Bitti wood (Vitex cofasus). The wood is the main material to make hull frames of phinisi boat, because the wood is naturally in curved shape. Animals commonly found in the forest are deer, pigs, monkeys and jungle fowls.

The flora and fauna in Tana Toa are conserved by local community, not only because of the penalties as mush as tallu lasa' (about 1.2 millions of rupiah), but also because they are afraid of a curse as the result of breaking the old tradition of the antecedents, Pasanga ri Kajang.

Tana Toa has a tropical rainforest climate. Throughout the year the humidity is high due to the significant annual precipitation of around 1453 mm. The average annual high temperature in Tana Toa is around 89.25 °F (31.81 °C) and the average annual low temperature is 71 °F (22 °C). The village's wet season runs from October through June, while the dry season covers the remaining three months.

Climate data for Cipanas
Month	Jan	Feb	Mar	Apr	May	Jun	Jul	Aug	Sep	Oct	Nov	Dec	Year
Mean daily maximum °C (°F)	30 (86)	30 (86)	31 (87)	32 (89)	32 (90)	32 (90)	32 (90)	33 (91)	34 (93)	33 (92)	32 (90)	31 (87)	31.81 (89.25)
Mean daily minimum °C (°F)	22 (72)	23 (73)	23 (73)	23 (74)	23 (73)	21 (70)	19 (67)	20 (68)	21 (69)	21 (70)	22 (72)	22 (71)	22 (71)
Average precipitation mm (inches)	281.1 (11.07)	279.9 (11.02)	157.6 (6.20)	87.9 (3.46)	58.9 (2.32)	47.2 (1.86)	5 (0.2)	2 (0.1)	2 (0.1)	60.9 (2.40)	155.1 (6.11)	315.9 (12.44)	1,453.5 (57.22)
Source: http://www.worldweatheronline.com/v2/weather-averages.aspx?q=-5.350382,120.29834
