= South Sulawesi Guerrilla Unit =

- Kesatuan Gerilya Sulawesi Selatan
- Founder: Saleh Sjahban
- Leaders: Saleh Sjahban (1949-1950); Kahar Muzakkar (1950-1953) †
- Military leader: Bahar Mattaliu
- Founded: 1949
- Dates active: 1949–1953
- Merged into: Darul Islam
- Active regions: South Sulawesi, Southeast Sulawesi
- Wars: South Sulawesi insurgency

The South Sulawesi Guerrilla Unit (Indonesian: Kesatuan Gerilya Sulawesi Selatan), was a rebel guerrilla organization present in South Sulawesi, Indonesia. The group was founded on August 17, 1949, as a union of 12 different guerrilla groups.

== History ==
The KGSS was founded on August 17, 1949, by merging multiple guerrilla groups into one. Its aims were to establish control over guerrillas as not to experience any obstacles in "its confrontation with the guerilla troops", and an instrument in effecting the demobilization of guerrillas. Following groups joined KGSS (note that the sources often give different list of groups and their commanders so the list should only be a guide):

Guerilla groups in Sulawesi
| Guerilla group | Leader | Area | Notes |
|---|---|---|---|
| "Harimau Indonesia Battalion" aka Wolter Monginsidi Batallion | Andi Wolter, Andi Sose | Kalosi and Messenrempulu, Enrekang | Enrolled in the Indonesian army on 4 March 1952 as the 720th TNI Battalion |
| "Bonthain Batallion" | A.R. Makmur Sitaka | Bantaeng Regency | Joined the Indonesian army |
| | Andi Pattawari | Bone | Remained with Muzakkar |
| Rebel Body of the Republic of Indonesia / Bau Massepe Batallion | Andi Selle | Patjekke , Parepare, Benteng, Pinrang | Enrolled in the Indonesian army on 17 August 1951 as the 719th TNI Battalion, except for the faction led by Hamid Gali and Usman Balo which former the People's Security Army |
| "Batu Putih" | Kaso Gani, then Andi Mandar Majene, then Andi Tenriadjeng | Makale, Palopo | Andi Tenriadjeng feil in battle in May 1954 |
| | Mohammad Djufri Tambora | Kolaka Regency and Konawe Regency | Remained loyal to Muzakkar and only surrendered in 1961 |
| Anshar Battalion | Machmud Fakri | | |
| Mobile Brigade Ratulangi | Arief Rate, Azis Taba | Gowa Regency, Bantaeng Regency | Half of it was inaugurated on 25 May 1952 as the 722nd TNI Battalion under the command of Captain Azis Taba; the rest, under the command of Bahar Mattalioe, remained with Kahar |
| Combat Troop Battalion | | | |
| Lipang Badjeng / Jeneponto Mobile Brigade | Daeng Sibali | Polongbangkeng | Enrolled in the Indonesian army on 28 April 1952 as the 721st TNI Battalion |
| 40,0000 Mobile Troop Batallion | M. Arief, Syamsul Bachri | Enrekang city, Bone-Wajo area | Enrolled in the Indonesian army as the 723rd TNI Battalion on 25 May 1952 |
| Pagessa Army | Daeng Pagessa | | Joined the Indonesian army on 1 July 1952 as a company |
| Mandar/Mondar Army | S. Mengga | Polewali Mandar Regency, Majene Regency | Joined the Indonesian army on 3 September 1952 as a company |
| Singke Army | Andi Singke | Sengkang | Joined the Indonesian army on 20 May 1952 as a company |

In April 1950, during the Andi Aziz Rebellion, the organization occupied a multitude of regions in South Sulawesi, to collect all the arms they could lay their hands on and to dismiss all government officials they considered reactionary or whom they knew to have collaborated with the State of East Indonesia.

In June 1950, the KGSS wanted to be incorporated to the Indonesian army. Kahar Muzakkar went to a meeting with Kawilarang, he rejected his troops' entry to the Indonesian army. Kahar proceeded to remove the insignia off him and say that if his requests were not accepted, he would rebel against the Indonesian government.

The KGSS attacked former KNIL units on August 6, 1950, in Ujungpadang (today Makassar), assisting Indonesian troops; however, an incident occurred between a KGSS member and the army. The troops quickly returned to the jungle, and a full-fledged guerrilla war began. Trees were cut down and bridges destroyed all over South Sulawesi, except Bonthain.

After multiple engagements and negotiations, the group was integrated into the Indonesian army as the Badan Persiapan Perumahan, or Korps Cadangan Nasional Sulawesi Selatan, on March 25, 1951. On August 17, 1951, the group left their camps and returned to the jungle during a ceremony, where the rebellion restarted.

On January 20, 1952, Kahar Muzakkar accepted a leader sent by Sekarmadji M. Kartosoewirjo, leader of Darul Islam, asking if he wanted to join Darul Islam. The group became the 'Fourth Division of the Islamic Army of Indonesia'. However, only on August 7, 1953, would Muzakkar name his troops formally under Darul Islam.
