= Indonesian National Youth Centre =

- Pusat Pemuda Nasional Indonesia
- Founding leader: Manai Sophiaan
- Military leader: Aminnuddin Muchlis
- Dates active: 1945-1951
- Merged into: National Armed Forces of Indonesia
- Part of: Indonesian People's Rebel Army of Sulawesi (1946-1949); South Sulawesi Guerrilla Unit (1949-1951)
- Wars: Indonesian National Revolution

Indonesian National Youth Centre (Indonesian: Pusat Pemuda Nasional Indonesia) – was an anti-colonial militia active in South Sulawesi during the Indonesian National Revolution.

== History ==
The group initially was formed by Manai Sophian and conssited of students in the Makassar city with 25 groups each covering one district of the city. The group armed itself with rifles, bajonets, samurai swords, pistols, hand grenades, and daggers left behind by the Japanese army. On 27 October 1945 staged a rebellion in Makassar capturing the Radio Makassar, Kis Kampement Mariso, the Matoangin and Maradekaja radio stations, the police barracks on Jalan Gowa, the NICA Co. Office, and the police station. Australian and NICA forced quickly recaptured the city, arresting multiple members of the group including the chairman. The group's headquarters was moved to Polongbangkeng where Lipang Badjeng was based. On 17 July 1946 the group joined the Indonesian People's Rebel Army of Sulawesi (LAPRIS) coalition of rebel groups, represented by Aminnuddin Muchlis.

On 17 August 1949 the group named "Bonthain Battalion" under Makmur Sitakka joined the new rebel coalition, South Sulawesi Guerrilla Unit led by Abdul Kahar Muzakkar.

== Notable members ==
- Aminuddin Muchlis Bonto Daeng Ngirate: Secretary General of PPNI
- Abdul Maula: Chairman of PPNI
- Daeng Bulu: General Welfare Minister
- Guru Hamang: Organization commissioner
- Ali Malaka: Tactics / Strategy Commission
- Manai Sophiaan
- Makmur Sitakka: Intelligence Commission
- Lanto Daeng Pasewang (advisor)
