= South Sulawesi insurgency =

Indonesian Islamic militants rebellion

- Part of the Darul Islam rebellion and Age of Gerombolan
- Map of the insurgency at peak rebel control
Date	April 1950 – 19 July 1965 (individual fighters remained in hiding til the 1980s)
Location	Indonesia, South Sulawesi
Result	Government victory
Territorial changes	All territories controlled by rebels were recaptured by the government

Belligerents
Republic of Indonesia; Dompea; People's Security Army; Indonesian Republican Army; People's Defense Organization Konawe Jihad Forces	South Sulawesi Guerrilla Unit (1950-1953); Darul Islam (1953-1965); Permesta (1958-1965); Batallion 710 (1964)

Commanders and leaders
(Indonesia) Andi Selle (1950-1964); Amma Lolo †; Usman Balo (since 1953); Andi Makkoelaoe; Paulus Silaba Alim Taufik	Abdul Kahar Muzakkar †; Jan Willem Gerungan (executed); Andi Selle (1964) †

The South Sulawesi insurgency was an insurgency waged by the South Sulawesi Guerrilla Unit (subsequently rebranded as Darul Islam branch) to establish Islamic law in the Celebes island in Indonesia.

== Joining Darul Islam ==
On 7 August 1953, Kahar formally proclaimed South Sulawesi as part of the West Java Darul Islam at a gathering in Makalua. He read the proclamation of 1949, claiming that Sulawesi and its surroundings were part of the Islamic State of Indonesia. At this same gathering, Kahar also issued several regulations to start off the new movement. He announced the new DI flags for South Sulawesi and its surroundings. The state flag was to be red with a yellow crescent and three yellow stars, while the military flag was red with three yellow stars and the number '24'. He also activated a curfew within the areas of DI, and Islamic law was formally adopted. Kahar called on those who were not Muslims to voluntarily support the Islamic community, and labelled the existing guerrillas who were not part of the Islamic army as quttautthariq (Ar. 'robbers').

== Anti-Darul Islam guerilla groups ==
=== Dompea ===
When the Darul Islam movement invaded the Bulukumba Regency regency in 1953, they imposed a strict version of the Sharia law on local population. The Kajang people were specifically singled out due to their adherence to local pre-Islamic beliefs in spirits. In response, in 1954 a militia was formed called Dompea to kick out the Islamic rebels out of the region. Their members were wearing all-black clothes and headbands called "passapu' le'leng" and were armed with badik knives as well as sharpened bamboo sticks.

The leader of the rebellion, self-proclaimed "Amma Lolo" began recruiting fighters from areas as far north as Tanete and as far south as Ara. In 1955 the militia launched an attack on Darul Islam, they would cut throats of the Darul Islam fighters eventually reaching the village of Bira in the south. Over the course of six months the movement has spread to Sinjai, Bulukumba, Bantaeng and Takalar regencies. The self-proclaimed army attacked mosques forbidding people from praying in them and eventually managed to kick all Darul Islam fighters out of the region by 1956.

In 1957 however Darul Islam rebels launched a counteroffensive against the Dompea fighters. They first clashed at Panremo in Bonto Tanga with multiple casualties at both sides. They then clashed at Mount Lembang Gogoso in Sinjai where Islamis fighters armed with machine guns managed to defeat the militiamen who were armed with spears, killing multiple men, women and children including Amma Lolo.

Darul Islam rebels imposed then collective punishment on the Kajang people, razing to the ground tribal villages, forbidding tribal cults, executing some Kajang people as well as isolated the community by blowing up bridges and cutting down telephone wires.

=== Konawe Jihad Forces ===
On 5 May 1955, Pasukan Djihad Konawe (PDK) was founded in Kendari in response to the abuses of DI/TII and Battalion 718 of the Indonesian army. This armed group's troops mainly consisted of Tolaki people. On 15 September, PDK repelled a DI/TII attack in Lambuya and Ameroro.

On 1 August 1956, PDK attacked six soldiers from the Batallion 718 in Kolono. In response to the entry of Darul Islam into the community in late 1956, PDK has split into two factions. Radical factions, led by Lambauta and Tambi Zulkarnaen and based in Anggotoa Wawotobi cooperated with the Indonesian Armed Forces while moderate group led by Muhammad Ali Silondae worked with Darul Islam.

In the first half of October 1957, PDK attacked a transmigrant settlement of Kolono, burning 500 houses and kidnapped six girls. On 10 March 1958, an agreement was concluded which specified that PDK will be integrated into the Indonesian military.

=== People's Security Army ===
In December 1952, Usman Balo of the Latumojang Battalion of South Sulawesi Guerrilla Unit entered the territory of the Rante Mario Battalion. There was subsequently some fighting, in which units of the latter battalion were put to flight. Usman Balo cut all ties with Kahar Muzakkar afterwards. This conflict reached its peak in December 1954, when a threeday battle was fought between the rivals' respective forces to the north-east of Pinrang starting on 14 December. When on 8 January 1955 a second battle was fought between the TKR and Darul Islam in the Matakali direction, the Republican Army went to the aid of the former.

In February 1995, a third attack was launched by DI on TKR headuqarters Mampise with DI forces bypassing Barukku on 10 February. After five days of fighting Indonesian armed forces came to the rescue of TKR, from this point on both groups working together. In October 1957, People's Security Army was officially integrated into the Indonesian Armed Forces.

=== People's Defense Organization ===
People's Defense Organization (Organisasi Pertahanan Rakyat) was formed in early 1958 in the Mamasa Regency. Led by Paulus Silaba, the group launched an attack on DI-held Mambi in March of that year.

=== Indonesian Republican Army ===
Creating in November 1954 by Andi Makkoelaoe and Ismail. On 26 June 1956 5,000 TRI fighters swore an oath to the army.

== End of the rebellion ==
According to the information collected by Anhar Gonggong, Kahar was killed on 3 February 1965 by Corporal Sadeli of the Indonesian Army. It was reported that Sadeli heard the sound of a radio playing in the forest near the Lasolo River area, and approached the source of the sound, knowing that Kahar always carried with him a transistor radio. Sadeli had initially wanted to capture Kahar alive, but upon seeing the grenade in his hand, he shot to kill instead. He then compared a photograph of Kahar with that of the dead body, and concluded that the man he had killed was truly Kahar. The body was retrieved by a helicopter and flown to Makassar, where it was received by Mohammad Jusuf at Palemonia Hospital. Upon the announcement of Kahar's death, only one of his wives, 2 children and an uncle were authorized to see the body. Kahar's son, Abdullah, identified his father from the eczema on his foot and his dentures.

Following Kahar's death other Darul Islam commander in South Sulawesi turned in gradually. Jan Willem Gerungan was arrested on 19 July 1965, tried by a summary court and executed. Corry van Stenus, second wife of Muzakkar, surrendered on 2 October 1967 with a son, an adopted daughter, and seven followers in Sumilin. One DI/TII fighter, Sanusi Daris, decided to hide in a cave where he only emerged from in October 1982.

== Life under rebel control ==
In areas under control of Darul Islam troops in South Sulawesi a strict version of the Sharia law was enforced. Theft was punished with cutting off hands, displays of wealth were prohibited.

=== Religious minorities ===
Christians and animists were persecuted under the Darul Islam rule. Forced conversions to Islam were commonplace as well as executions of those refusing to convert.

=== Women ===
Muzakkar himself had nine wives and made it illegal to criticize polygamy. The minimum age of marriage of 15 and women were prohibited from rejecting man's marriage proposal unless they had a valid reason. Dowry nad marriage expenses were capped and wedding celebrations could not exceed one day. Those guilty of violating those rules could be executed. Women were forced to wear head coverings. and according to some reporters adultery allegations were punishable with death.

=== LGBT people ===
Muzakkar's DI troops prosecuted "bissu" people, traditional practitioners of a religious cult involving dressing in women'c clothes, killing multiple of them.
