= Rebel Body of the Republic of Indonesia =

- Badan Pemberontak Republik Indonesia
- Founding leader: Andi Abdullah Bau Massepe
- Military leader: Andi Selle
- Dates active: 1945-1951
- Merged into: National Armed Forces of Indonesia
- Active regions: Pinrang Regency, South Sulawesi
- Part of: Indonesian People's Rebel Army of Sulawesi (1945-1949); South Sulawesi Guerrilla Unit (1949-1951)
- Wars: Indonesian National Revolution

Rebel Body of the Republic of Indonesia (Indonesian: Badan Pemberontak Republik Indonesia) – was an anti-colonial militia active in South Sulawesi during the Indonesian National Revolution.

== History ==
The group was set up in mid-September 1945 by Andi Abdullah Bau Massepe with Andi Selle has a chief of staff of the group. In November 1945 Bau Massepe sent a letter to the Indonesian government asking for reinforcement. Dutch police surrounded BPRI office and confiscated Indonesian response. Several battles between the BPRI and other rebel groups against NICA/KNIL troops occurred, including the Battle of Padang Loangnge' on October 20, 1945, Kariango/Pajojoreng on October 25, 1945, and attacks on the Parepare-Sidrap and Parepare-Pinrang roads in November 1945. Later, several battles took place in January 1946 in Bonrongnge', February 1946 in Bacukiki, March 1946 in Polejiwa, and Tiroang Pinrang. In May 1946, a Dutch convoy was intercepted in Menuang/Alitta and armed clashes occurred in Manggarongkong and Lakessi/Lauleng. Then, in July 1946, a general attack occurred on the NICA position in Rappang and the Battle of Carawali on August 26, 1946. In June 1946, Abubakar Lambogo was appointed commander of the Republic of BPRI in the Enrekang area because of his blue blood background and his figure as an educated person.

On 17 July 1946 the group joined the Indonesian People's Rebel Army of Sulawesi coalition of rebel groups.

On 17 August 1949 the group joined the new rebel coalition, South Sulawesi Guerrilla Unit led by Abdul Kahar Muzakkar. The group enrolled in the Indonesian army on 17 August 1951 as the 719th TNI Battalion, except for the faction led by Hamid Gali and Usman Balo which former the People's Security Army.

== Notable members ==
- Andi Abdullah Bau Massepe
- Andi Selle
- Hamid Gali
- Usman Balo
- Abubakar Lambogo
