= Maulwi Saelan =

Indonesian footballer

- Maulwi in 2003

Chairman of the Football Association of Indonesia
- In office 1964–1967
- Preceded by: Abdul Wahab Joyohadikusumo
- Succeeded by: Kosasih Purwanegara

Personal details
- Born: 8 August 1926 Makassar, Celebes, Dutch East Indies
- Died: 10 October 2016 (aged 90) Jakarta, Indonesia
- Resting place: Kalibata Heroes' Cemetery
- Relatives: Emmy Saelan (sister)
- Education: Open University (PhD)

Military service
- Allegiance: Indonesia
- Branch/service: Indonesian Army
- Years of service: 1945–1974
- Rank: Colonel
- Unit: Infantry (1946–1949); Military police (1949–1974)
- Commands: Sulawesi Student Army Brigade XVI; Para Military Police Battalion; Tjakrabirawa Regiment
- Battles/wars: Indonesian National Revolution; Operation Trikora
Association football career
- Height: 1.70 m (5 ft 7 in)
- Position: Goalkeeper
Senior career*
Years	Team	Apps	(Gls)
1950–1962	PSM Makassar		
International career
1956–1961	Indonesia	30	(0)
Medal record
Men's football
Representing Indonesia
Asian Games
Bronze medal – third place	1958 Tokyo
- * Club domestic league appearances and goals

Maulwi Saelan (8 August 1926 – 10 October 2016) was an Indonesian military officer and football goalkeeper. His most notable achievements were captaining Indonesia at the 1956 Summer Olympics and being a personal aide to President Sukarno.

== Early life and football career ==
Maulwi Saelan was born on 8 August 1926 in Makassar, Celebes, Dutch East Indies. He was the son of Amin Saelan, who established the Makassar Taman Siswa. He joined the Indonesia national football team between 1954 and 1958 and contributed greatly to the nation's success in reaching the top four of the 1954 Asian Games and winning a bronze medal at the 1958 Asian Games.

One of Maulwi's heroic performances was when Indonesia facing the Soviet Union on 29 November 1956 at the 1956 Summer Olympics in Melbourne. Indonesia at that time managed to hold the Soviet Union, which was one of the strongest teams in Europe and the world, to a goalless draw. Maulwi struggled to withstand the onslaught of Igor Netto, Sergei Salnikov, and Boris Tatushin.

== Military career ==
Maulwi began his military career when he joined a military organization called Indonesian People's Rebel Army of Sulawesi known by the abbreviation LAPRIS as a Member, but not long after the leadership of LAPRIS formed a mobile / fast-moving force called Harimau Indonesia where he was trusted to be its chief of staff until at its peak he officially became an Indonesian National Armed Forces officer with the final rank of Colonel CPM (Ret.) while the last position he held was Deputy Commander of the Tjakrabirawa Regiment, where the regiment was the guard force of the first President of the Republic of Indonesia, Sukarno, with a strength of around 4 Battalions and 1 Personal Guard Detachment.

== Death ==
Maulwi died on 10 October 2016, at the age of 90 at Pertamina Central Hospital in Jakarta. Previously, he suffered from complications related to his heart, kidneys, and lungs, necessitating treatment in the intensive care unit at Pondok Indah Hospital. His body was interred the following day at the Kalibata Heroes' Cemetery in South Jakarta, with a military funeral ceremony led by Colonel Sudarma.

== Honours ==
PSM Makassar

- Perserikatan: 1955–57

Indonesia

- Asian Games (bronze) Bronze medal: 1958
- Merdeka Tournament: 1960

Individual

- IFFHS Men’s All Time Indonesia Dream Team: 2022

== Works ==
Books

- Saelan, Maulwi (2008). Nino, Cicero (ed.). Dari Revolusi 45 sampai Kudeta 66: kesaksian Wakil Komandan Tjakrabirawa (in Indonesian). Indonesia: Visimedia. ISBN 979-104-399-X.

Sporting positions
Preceded by Abdul Wahab Joyohadikusumo	Chairman of Football Association of Indonesia; 1964–1967	Succeeded by Kosasih Purwanegara
