= Indonesian People's Rebel Army of Sulawesi =

- Laskar Pemberontak Rakyat Indonesia Sulawesi
- Leader: Robert Wolter Mongisidi (executed)
- Founded: 17 July 1946
- Dates active: 1946–1949
- Headquarters: Polongbangkeng
- Wars: Indonesian National Revolution: South Sulawesi campaign of 1946–1947

The Indonesian People's Rebel Army of Sulawesi (Indonesian: Laskar Pemberontak Rakyat Indonesia Sulawesi), was an umbrella organization of anti-Dutch rebel guerrillas active during the Indonesian National Revolution in South Sulawesi.

== History ==
On 17 July 1946, Mongisidi with Ranggong Daeng Romo and others formed the Indonesian people's resistance army in Sulawesi (Indonesian: Laskar Pemberontak Rakyat Indonesia Sulawesi (LAPRIS)), which continually harassed and attacked Dutch positions.

| Flag | Name (Indonesian) | Name (English) | Leader | Location |
|---|---|---|---|---|
| | Lipang Badjeng | Bajeng Centipedes | Mappa Dg. Temba | |
| | Pusat Pemuda Nasional Indonesia | Indonesian National Youth Centre | Amin Muchlis | Makassar |
| | Pemuda Tanete | Tanete Youth | Ali Malaka | Tanete |
| | Angkatan Muda R.I. Selajar | | Bento | Selayar Island |
| | Pemberontak Bulukumba Angkatan Rakjat | Bulukumba People's Rebels | Andi Sjamsuddin | Bulukumba |
| | Penerdjang Pendjadjah Indonesia | Indonesian Colonial Front | A. Rasjid Faqih | Bantaeng |
| | Lasjkar pemberontak Turatea | Turatea Rebel Army | Muhd. Said Sila | Binamu, Jeneponto Regency |
| | Buka Limbung | | Nuhung | Limbung |
| | Kebaktian Rakyat Pallangga | Pallangga People's Service | Nurdin | Pallangga |
| | Angkatan Lasykar Rakyat | People's Army Task Force | Rd. Sukarto | Makassar |
| | Barisan Pemberontak lndonesia | Indonesian Revolutionary Corps | Rd. Sukarto | Makassar |
| | K.P.S. | | Rd. Sukarto | Makassar |
| | Pemuda Maros | The Maros Youth | Baddara Dg. Situdju | Maros |
| | Pemuda Tjamba | The Tjamba Youth | Baddara Dg. Situdju | Tjamba |
| | Harimau Indonesia | Indonesian Tigers | Bahang | Pangkadjene |
| | Laptur B. Bangkala | | Kr. Kuning | Taroang |
| | Gaptis | | Abdullah | Soppeng Regency |
| | Badan pemberontak Republik Indonesia | Rebel Body of the Republic of Indonesia | Andi Abdullah Bau Massepe | Pare-Pare |

Following people were appointed as the group leaders: Pajonga Daeng Ngalle as Lapris' protector and advisor, Ranggong Daeng Romo as war commander, and Robert Wolter Mongisidi as Secretary, assisted by Emmy Saelan. Mongisidi was caught by the Dutch on 28 February 1947, but managed to escape on 27 October 1947. The Dutch caught him again and this time sentenced him to death. Mongisidi was executed by firing squad on 5 September 1949. LARPIS was formed as a coalition of 19 rebel groups:

KNIL attacked the Lapris base in Polongbangkeng on 8 August 1946, forcing them to retreat to the forest.
