= Kajang (disambiguation) =

Kajang is a town in the state of Selangor in Malaysia.

Kajang may also refer to:

- Kajang (Indonesia), district in the Indonesian province of South Sulawesi
- Kajang (dish), a kind of satay
