= PKR =

The initials PKR may refer to:

== Codes ==
- Pokhara International Airport, Nepal, by IATA code
- Pakistani rupee, ISO 4217 currency code
- Krotoszyn County, Greater Poland Voivodeship, vehicle registration

== Entertainment ==
- PKR.com, poker site

== Organizations ==
- People's Justice Party (Malaysia)

== Science and technology ==
- Pauson–Khand reaction in chemistry
- Parallel kinetic resolution in organic chemistry
- Protein kinase R, an enzyme

== See also ==
- PKRS (disambiguation)
