= List of mayors of Parepare =

This is a list of the mayors of Parepare, South Sulawesi, since its incorporation as a city in 1960.

== List ==
#	Mayor (Birth–Death)	Took office	Left office	Period	Note	Vice Mayor
1	H. Andi Mannaungi (1925–2001)	17 February 1960	1965	1	(Note: First Mayor of Parepare)	—
2	Andi Mappangara	1965	1968	2		—
—	Andi Makkoelaoe	1968	1969	2	(Note: Status of Acting Substitute Officer (Pgs.) KDH Parepare Mayor)	—
3	Drs. Andi Mallarangeng (1936–1972)	1969	1972	3	(Note: The youngest Mayor of Parepare (32 years old when installed)) (Note: He died while serving in 1972)	—
4	Abdullah Adjaib	1972	1973	3		—
5	Drs. H. Parawansa	1973	1977	4		—
6	Drs. H. M. Joesoef Madjid	1977	1983	5		—
—	Prof. Dr. Ahmad Amiruddin (1932–2014)	1983	1983	5	(Note: Status of Acting (Acting) Mayor of Parepare) (Note: Accompanying his position as Governor of South Sulawesi)	—
7	Drs. H. Andi Samad Thahir	28 July 1983	28 July 1988	6		—
8	H. Mirdin Kasim; SH, M.Si (19??–2004)	28 July 1988	28 July 1993	7		—
9	Drs. H. Syamsul Alam Bulu; M.Si	28 July 1993	28 July 1998	8		—
10	H. Basrah Hafid; S.H, M.M (1950–2015)	28 July 1998	28 July 2003	9		Drs. H. Tadjuddin Kammisi; M.M
11	Drs. H. Zain Katoe (1945–2017)	28 July 2003	28 July 2008	10		Drs. H. Tadjuddin Kammisi; M.M
—	Drs. H. Andi Sulham Hasan; M.Si	28 July 2008	28 October 2008	—	(Note: The previous mayor's term of office has expired, replaced by Acting (Pj.) Mayor Parepare due to the preparation of the first Election of Parepare City 2008)	—
(11)	Drs. H. Zain Katoe (1945–2017)	28 October 2008	22 November 2010	11	(Note: The second period is served after winning in the first election of the Mayor of Parepare 2008 with a vote of 41.09%) (Note: In 2010, it was deactivated due to bribery related cases)	H. Sjamsu Alam
—	H. Sjamsu Alam (1942–)	22 November 2010	18 March 2013	11	(Note: Appointed as Acting (Plt.) Mayor of Parepare after the mayor was previously deactivated)	—
12	H. Sjamsu Alam (1942–)	18 March 2013	28 October 2013	11	(Note: Status of Acting Mayor Mayor is appointed as Mayor)	—
13	H. Taufan Pawe; S.H, M.H (1965–)	30 October 2013	30 October 2018	12		Ir H. Faisal Andi Sapada; S.E, M.M
—	H. Lutfie Natsir; S.H	15 February 2018	23 June 2018	12	(Note: Temporary Acting (Acting) replaces the Mayor and Deputy Mayor, who leave the campaign until June 23, 2018)	—
(13)	H. Taufan Pawe; S.H, M.H (1965–)	31 October 2018	31 October 2023	13		Pangerang Rahim
—	Dr. Drs. Akbar Ali; A.P., M.Si. (1975–)	31 October 2023	18 September 2024	—		—
—	Dr. Abdul Hayat Gani; M.Si. (1965–)	18 September 2024	20 February 2025	—		—
14	H. Tasming Hamid; S.E., M.H. (1985–)	20 February 2025	Incumbent	14		Hermanto
