= Abubakar Lambogo =

Indonesian nobleman and military figure from Enrekang

- Born: 1913
- Died: 13 March 1947 (aged 33–34); Enrekang, Sulawesi, Indonesia
- Military career
- Allegiance: Indonesia
- Branch: Republic of Indonesia Army
- Service years: 1945-1947
- Rank: Captain
- Conflicts: Indonesian National Revolution: South Sulawesi campaign of 1946–1947 †

Abubakar Lambogo (1913 – 13 March 1947) was a nobleman and military figure from Enrekang who was shot and beheaded by the Dutch. He was nicknamed Puang Bakkarang.

== Early life and education ==
Abubakar was born in 1913 as Lambogo. He was descended from the Massenrempulu nobility. His father, Haji Lambogo Pettana Bali, served as a spokesperson (pabbicara) in Massenrempulu, and his mother's name was I Nambe.

Abubakar attended People's School (elementary school, literally People's School) in 1923. During his school years, he witnessed injustice, as students were divided into classes based on their parents' social status and lineage. Seeing this situation, Abubakar wanted to change it.

== Career ==
=== Dutch and Japanese periods ===
During Dutch colonial rule, Abubakar worked as a teacher at a People's School. He later served as a police inspector in Ranga District during the Japanese occupation.

=== National Revolution ===
After receiving the news of the proclamation of Indonesian independence, Abubakar joined an armed militia called the Indonesian National Youth (Pemuda Nasional Indonesia) in September 1945, serving as its vice chairman. He then attended a meeting on 27 September 1945 that led to the establishment of an armed militia called the Indonesian People's Formation Body (Badan Pembentukan Rakyat Indonesia), where he was appointed its chairman.

The massive Dutch and Allied attacks on Enrekang prompted Abubakar to organize a meeting in Garege to strengthen the resistance forces of the local youth. At the meeting, the attendees agreed to establish a joint command under his leadership. In June 1946, he was appointed commander of the Indonesian Rebel Body of the Republic of Indonesia in the Enrekang region because of his aristocratic lineage and educated background.

On 28 January 1947, Saleh Lahade, Chief of Staff of the Hasanuddin Division of the Republic of Indonesia Army (Tentara Republik Indonesia, TRI), appointed Abubakar as commander of the 1st Battalion of the TRI in Enrekang, with the rank of captain.

== Death ==
In March 1947, Abubakar escorted M. Saleh Lahade and Andi Odang to Palopo to inaugurate the 3rd Regiment of the Hasanuddin Division. On 12 March, Lahade's entourage encountered Andi Selle Mattola's group in Maiwa. Upon arriving in Maiwa, Selle invited Lahade to his headquarters in Suppa. Lahade accepted the invitation, while Abubakar declined because he was ill.

After declining Selle's invitation, Abubakar and his troops spent the night in Salu Wajo. The following day, on 13 March, KNIL forces launched a surprise attack on Abubakar and his men while they were bathing. The KNIL troops had previously been tracking the movements of Abubakar's forces. Abubakar's troops were defeated, and many of them were taken prisoner. He was shot in the thigh.

After Abubakar was shot in the thigh, he was taken to the KNIL headquarters in Enrekang in a severely wounded condition. He was subsequently tortured and later beheaded. The following day, the KNIL promised Abubakar's captured troops that they would be reunited with their commander. Upon arriving in Enrekang, the prisoners were shocked to see Abubakar's severed head displayed atop a bayonet. They were then forced to kiss his severed head. Abubakar's head was mounted on a stake in the marketplace for two days and one night to instill fear among the locals.

Abubakar was buried at the Enrekang Heroes Cemetery, with the date 26 June 1947 inscribed on his gravestone.

On 30 October 2020, the Dutch government paid compensation of Rp15,000,000 to Abubakar's son, Malik Abubakar, for the war crimes committed by the KNIL against his father.

== Personal life ==
Abubakar was married and had four children. Following his death, KNIL soldiers burned down his house. His wife protested at the local KNIL headquarters against the atrocities committed by the KNIL, which resulted in her being detained in prison for several days.

== Awards ==
In 1958, Soekarno awarded Abubakar the title of posthumous national hero. Abubakar's name was immortalized as a street in Makassar and a town square in Enrekang.

== Bibliographies ==
- Bulan, Cahaya Daeng (2022). Lintasan Sejarah Indonesia di Enrekang. @cahayabulancreative.
- Jupri, Jupri (2019). ABU BAKAR LAMBOGO DALAM GERAKAN PERJUANGAN RAKYAT ENREKANG (1945-1947) (Thesis). State University of Makassar.
