= Bontobahari =

- Kecamatan and town
- Location in Sulawesi
- Coordinates: 5°31′31″S 120°21′35″E
- Country: Indonesia
- Province: South Sulawesi
- Regency: Bulukumba Regency
- Time zone: UTC+7 (WIB)

Bontobahari or Bonto Bahari is a small town and kecamatan in South Sulawesi, Indonesia. The town is located on the south-eastern coast of Sulawesi on the Flores Sea and the surrounding area forms the Bontobahari Faunal Reserve, a protected area under conservation.

== Economy ==
Bonto Bahari means "Land of the Sea"; it is located at sea level and the soil in area is said to be too thin to support agriculture. It contains a series of fishponds which are owned by local villagers. Bontobahari is noted for its Konjo or Kunjo boatbuilders, Konjo being a tribe which inhabit Bontobahari and surrounding areas of Kajang, Herlang and Bonto Tiro within the Bulukumba Regency. In 1987 villagers built the Hati Marege and in December of that year, 13 people from Makassar sailed for northern Australia in it. The trip was a success and today this boat which was built in Bontobahari is located in the Darwin Museum.
