= Konawe Jihad Forces =

Militia in Indonesia

- Pasukan Djihad Konawe
- Leader: Alim Taufik
- Dates active: 1955–1958
- Merged into: Indonesian Armed Forces
- Headquarters: Wawotobi, Konawe
- Active regions: Southeast Sulawesi; Konawe Regency
- Wars: South Sulawesi insurgency

Konawe Jihad Forces was a militia active in Indonesia in the 1950s, which sometimes fought against or for Indonesian Armed Forces and Darul Islam.

== History ==
On 5 May 1955, Pasukan Djihad Konawe (PDK) was founded in Kendari in response to the abuses of DI/TII and Battalion 718 of the Indonesian army. This armed group's troops mainly consisted of Tolaki people. On 15 September, PDK repelled a DI/TII attack in Lambuya and Ameroro.

On 1 August 1956, PDK attacked six soldiers from the Batallion 718 in Kolono. In response to the entry of Darul Islam into the community in late 1956, PDK has split into two factions. Radical factions, led by Lambauta and Tambi Zulkarnaen and based in Anggotoa Wawotobi cooperated with the Indonesian Armed Forces while moderate group led by Muhammad Ali Silondae worked with Darul Islam.

In the first half of October 1957, PDK attacked a transmigrant settlement of Kolono, burning 500 houses and kidnapped six girls. On 10 March 1958, an agreement was concluded which specified that PDK will be integrated into the Indonesian military.

== Bibliographies ==
- Nur, Rifai (1999). Pasukan djihad Konawe : (gejolak sosial di Kewedanaan Kendari Sulawesi Tenggara 1955-1958).
- Hadara, Ali (28 February 2020). Gerakan Di/Tii Di Kolono Dan Sekitarnyaserta Reaksi Pasukan Djihad Konawe (Pdk) : 1955-1965.
