= Harimau Indonesia Battalion =

Indonesian Tigers
- Laskar Hariamu Indonesia
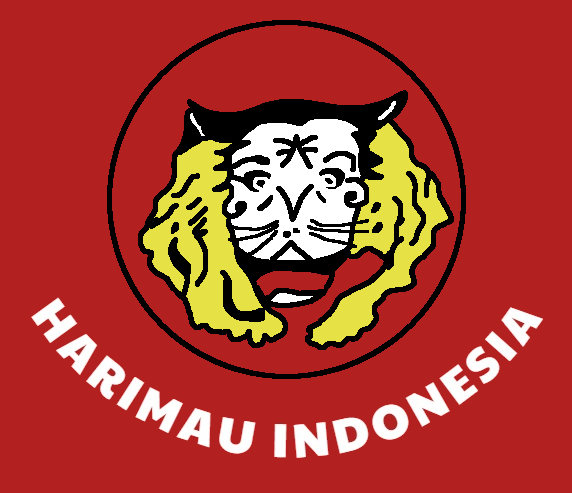
- Founding leader: Mochammad Syah
- Military leader: Maulwi Saelan
- Political leader: Robert Wolter Mongisidi (executed)
- Dates active: 1945-1954
- Merged into: Indonesian Armed Forces
- Active regions: South Sulawesi
- Part of: Indonesian People's Rebel Army of Sulawesi (1946-1949); South Sulawesi Guerrilla Unit (1949-1952)
- Wars: Indonesian National Revolution

Harimau Indonesia Battalion (literally Indonesian Tigers) was an Indonesian guerilla group operating in the South Sulawesi region against the Dutch.

== History ==
Harimau Indonesia Battalion was created in 1945 in the Dutch Indonesia to fight against the Dutch rule. The group consisted mostly of graduates of the National Junior High School in Masakaar. They attacked and occupied the Empres Hotel on 29 October 1945 from NICA and succeeded in freeing colleagues who were originally detained by NICA.

Force operated between 1946 and 1947 in the city of Makassar and its surrounding areas, including Gowa, Takalar, Pangkep, Barru, Enrekang, and Tana Toraja. They were divided into small, fast-moving units. Its leadership structure as established was:

- Supreme Leadership: Mochammad Syah
  - Makassar City: Robert Wolter Mongisidi, Daeng Bahang
  - Gowa And Takalar: Mochammad Syah, R. Endang
  - Pangkajene Kepulauan And Tanete-barru: Mochammad Syah, M. Kasim Dm, Maulwi Saelan
  - Massenreng Pulu And Tana Toraja: Andi Sose, P.b. Harahap

In October 1946 Andi Sose moved to Enrekang to expand Harimau Indonesia branch there.

On 17 August 1949 the battalion joined the South Sulawesi Guerrilla Unit. On 4 March 1952 as a part of demobilisation of former guerillas the battalion led by Andi Sose joined the National Indonesian Armed Forces as the 720th TNI Battalion. However a faction of the group led by Abdullah Haddade initially did not join. In late May 1954 a group of 64 Harimau Indonesia rebels led by Boy Malingkas surrendered in Makassar. Abdullah Haddade himself surrendered in late June.

== Legacy ==
In the city of Makassar there is a statue standing commemorating the battalion.
