= Andi Makkoelaoe =

Indonesian politician and military figure (born 1924)

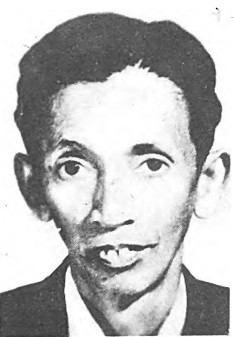
- Makkoelaoe in 1971

Member of the House of Representatives
- In office 1971–1977
- Constituency: South Sulawesi

Acting Mayor of Parepare
- In office 1968–1969
- Preceded by: Andi Mappangara
- Succeeded by: Andi Mallarangeng

Regent of Pinrang
- In office 19 February 1960 – 1964
- Preceded by: Position established
- Succeeded by: Andi Gazaling

Personal details
- Born: 1924 Rappang, Dutch East Indies
- Died: Unknown
- Party: Golkar

Andi Makkoelaoe (also known as Andi Makkulau, full name: Andi Makkulau bin Andi Patellui Petta Sau; born 1924) was an Indonesian military figure and politician.

== Early life and education ==
Son of the last king of Bone, Andi Mappanyukki, Makkoelaoe was born in Rappang in 1924. He completed his education at HIS Parepare in 1939. He also participated in several course such as Training Course B held by the Ministry of Home Affairs and English lesson in 1970.

== Career ==
Makkoelaoe began his career as a native administrative official trainee (CIBA) in 1939, but he did not finish it. In 1943, he took an internship at the office of Afdeeling Parepare. In 1947, he became a member of the South Sulawesi Council from North Wajo. He then served as the member of the Provisional Representative Body of East Indonesia from Sidenreng Rappang.

By 1953 he was the District Head of Pinrang. In November 1954 he fled his office to join an insurgent group in the South Sulawesi because of the Battalion 422 soldiers' misbehavior in Pinrang. He ended up creating his own group, the Indonesian Republican Army together with Ismael. He ran for the 1955 as a Constitutional Assembly candidate from People's Sovereignty Party (PKR) representing South Sulawesi and Southeast Sulawesi electoral district. In February 1956 he began negotiations with the government on returning into service and he moved into Makassar. On 26 June together with 5,000 TRI fighters he swore an oath to the army. Later, he was appointed as the Head of Governor Office's security in August 1956.

He was nominated a prefect of the Pinrang Regency on 19 February 1960, which he served until 1964. From 1968 to 1969 he was an acting mayor of Parepare. In 1970, he was appointed as the Head of the Financial Administration Bureau of the South Sulawesi Governor office. In the 1971 election, he was elected as the Member of the House of Representatives from Golkar.

== Personal life ==
Makkoelaoe was married to Andi Rukiah, last queen of Sawito. He has a kinship tie with Andi Selle. Through this family relation, he purchased weapons from Selle.

== Bibliography ==
- Harvey, Barbara Sillars (1989). Pemberontakan Kahar Muzakkar : Dari tradisi ke DI/TII. Jakarta: Grafiti Pers.
