= Turkish Cultural Center =

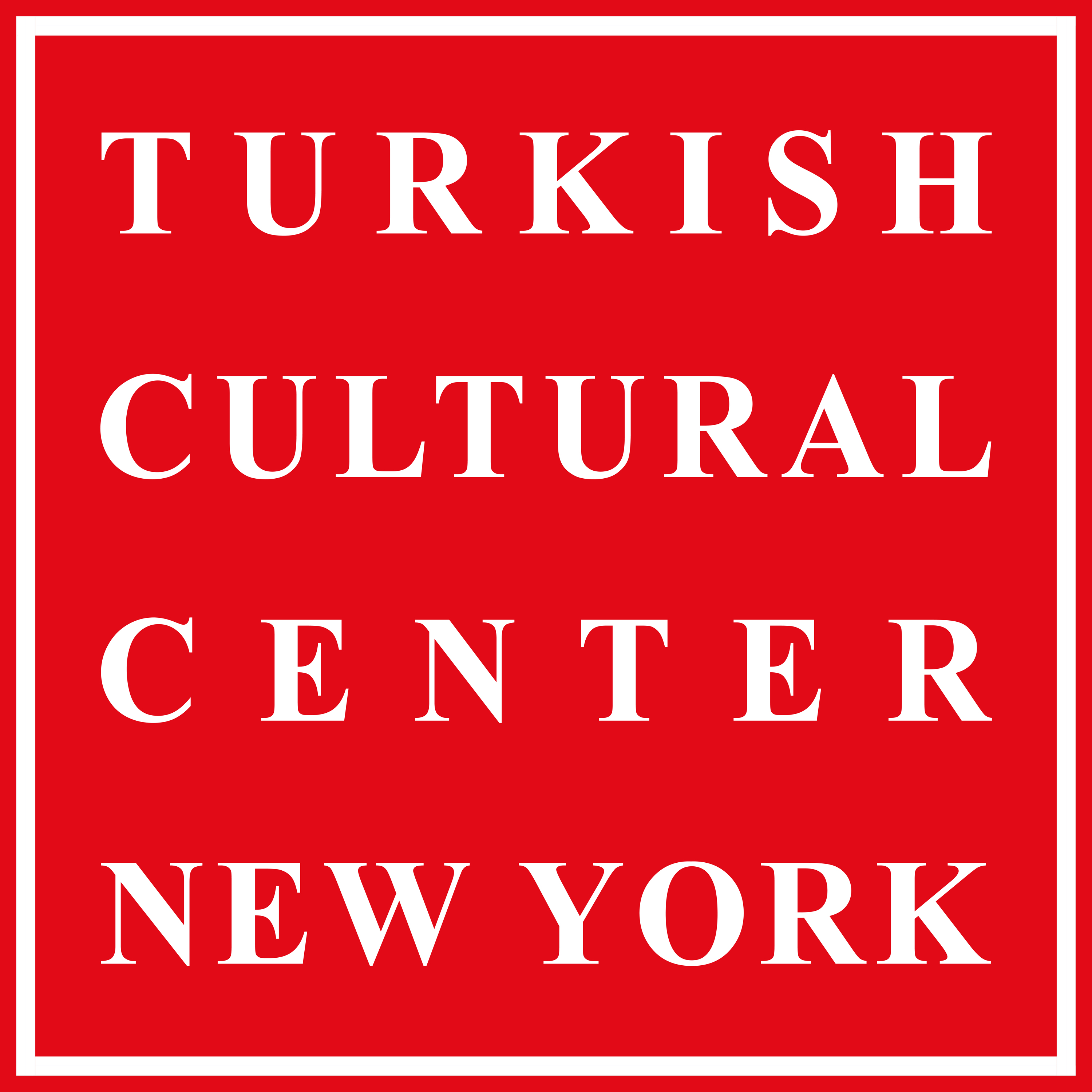
- Turkish Cultural Center New York Logo
- Headquarters: New York
- Region served: New York, New Jersey, Connecticut, Pennsylvania, Massachusetts, New Hampshire, Maine, Vermont
- Affiliations: Gülen movement
- Website: http://www.turkishculturalcenter.org http://www.tccnj.org http://www.turkishculturalcenterct.org http://www.tccpenn.org http://www.tccwesternmass.org http://www.turkishcenterboston.org http://www.tccnh.org http://www.tccvt.org http://www.tccme.org

Turkish Cultural Center (TCC) is dedicated to promoting Turkish Culture in the vein of the Gülen movement in the United States. TCC is a non-profit organization which operates under the Council of Turkic American Associations (CTAA) umbrella organization.

== See also ==
- Gülen movement
