= People's Security Army (South Sulawesi) =

Militia in Indonesia

- Tentara Keamanan Rakyat
- Leaders: Usman Balo; Hamid Gali
- Dates active: 1953–1957
- Split from: South Sulawesi Guerrilla Unit
- Merged into: Indonesian Armed Forces
- Active regions: Southeast Sulawesi
- Wars: South Sulawesi insurgency

People's Security Army (South Sulawesi) was a splinter group from Darul Islam which fought against them in Southern Sulawesi in the 1950s.

== History ==
In December 1952, Usman Balo of the Latumojang Battalion of South Sulawesi Guerrilla Unit entered the territory of the Rante Mario Battalion. There was subsequently some fighting, in which units of the latter battalion were put to flight. Usman Balo cut all ties with Kahar Muzakkar afterwards. This conflict reached its peak in December 1954, when a threeday battle was fought between the rivals' respective forces to the north-east of Pinrang starting on 14 December. When on 8 January 1955 a second battle was fought between the TKR and Darul Islam in the Matakali direction, the Republican Army went to the aid of the former.

In February 1952, a third attack was launched by DI on TKR headuqarters Mampise with DI forces bypassing Barukku on 10 February. After five days of fighting Indonesian armed forces came to the rescue of TKR, from this point on both groups working together. In October 1957, People's Security Army was officially integrated into the Indonesian Armed Forces.

== Bibliographies ==
- "Rebellion under the Banner of Islam: The Darul Islam in Indonesia". JSTOR. p. 166. doi:10.1163/j.ctvbqs6vx.
- Wulandari, Eka; Jumadi, Jumadi; Malihu, La (2020-08-17). "Aktivitas Gerombolan DI/TII dan Dampaknya Terhadap Masyarakat Sidrap 1950-1965". Pattingalloang (in Indonesian). 7 (2). doi:10.26858/jp.v7i2.13725 (inactive 11 July 2025). ISSN 2686-6463.
- Tangke, Wanua: Kahar Muzakkar masih hidup. sebuah misteri. 2002
- Radik Djarwadi, Soeharto: Pradjurit mengabdi gumpalan perang kemerdekaan Bataljon Y. 1959
