= Lipang Badjeng =

Bajeng Centipedes
- Lipang Badjeng
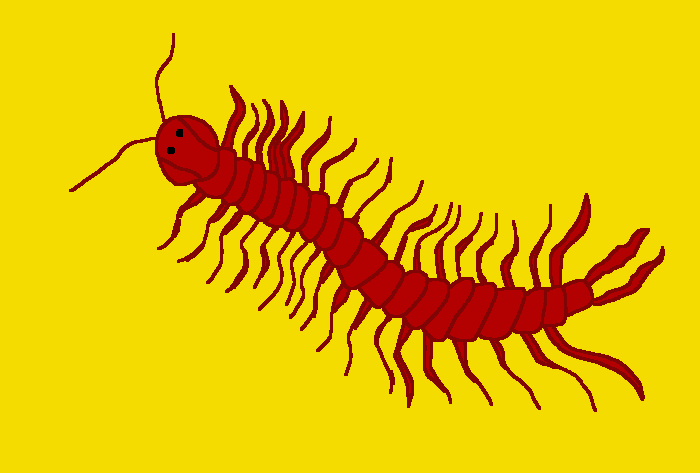
- Dates active: 1946-1952
- Merged into: National Armed Forces of Indonesia
- Headquarters: Polongbangkeng
- Active regions: South Sulawesi
- Part of: Indonesian People's Rebel Army of Sulawesi (1946-1949); South Sulawesi Guerrilla Unit (1949-1952)
- Wars: Indonesian National Revolution

Lipang Badjeng (literally Bajeng Centipedes) was an Indonesian guerilla group operating in the South Sulawesi region against the Dutch.

== History ==
Originally named Gerakan Muda Bajeng (Bajeng Youth Movement) set up on 16 October 1945 to fight against the Dutch colonial government, the organization was renamed to Lipang Badjeng on 2 April 1946. Pajonga Daeng Ngalle acted as patron, Makaraeng became chairman, and Ranggong Daeng Romo was commander of the troops. The group spread to Gowa, Jeneponto and the southern part of Makassar, it had 17,257 members in total. The group killed village heads, police and government officials they believed were disloyal. On 17 July 1946 the group joined the Indonesian People's Rebel Army of Sulawesi coalition of rebel groups. Between December 1946 and February 1947 Ranggong Daeng Romo led Lipang Badjeng in 57 battles. Following his death the group dispersed into smaller units led by local commanders. Following the 11 April 1947 NIT surrender ultimatum some groups surrendered. In the first week of August 1947 more skirmishes took place between Lipand Badjeng and police. In early January 1948 around 200 Bajeng fighters surrendered to NIT authorities under the promise of being granted immunity, but government broke the promise and handed them over to the KNIL.

On 17 August 1949 the group joined the new rebel coalition, South Sulawesi Guerrilla Unit led by Abdul Kahar Muzakkar. Bands of Lipand Badjeng fighters were involved in robberies after 1950. 600 Lipang Badjeng fighters led by Daeng Sibali enrolled in the Indonesian army on 28 April 1952 as the 721st TNI Battalion.

== Notable members ==
- Pajonga Daeng Ngalle
- Ranggong Daeng Romo † – killed in a battle with Dutch troops on 27 February 1947. Posthoumously awarded the title of National Hero of Indonesia.
- Makkaraeng Daeng Manjarungi
- Syamsuddin Daeng Ngerang
- Makatang Daeng Sibali
- Emmy Saelan † – she was the first Indonesian female fallen fighter during the revolution.
- Nyampa Siama
