= Dar al-Islam =

Dar al-Islam or Darul Islam (Arabic: دار الإسلام, literally 'house/abode of Islam')

- Dar al-Islam, an Islamic term for the Muslim regions of the world
- Dar al-Islam (organization), a small non-profit organization based in New Mexico, United States
- Dar al-Islam (magazine), a French-language magazine self-published by the Islamic militant organization ISIL/ISIS/IS/Daesh
- Darul Islam (Indonesia), an Islamist group responsible for an insurgency against the Indonesian government during the 1950s and 1960s
- Darul Islam (Nigeria), an Islamic organization based in Nigeria

== Mosques ==
- Daar-Ul-Islam, Saint Louis, a mosque located in Missouri, United States
