= Andi Abdullah Bau Massepe =

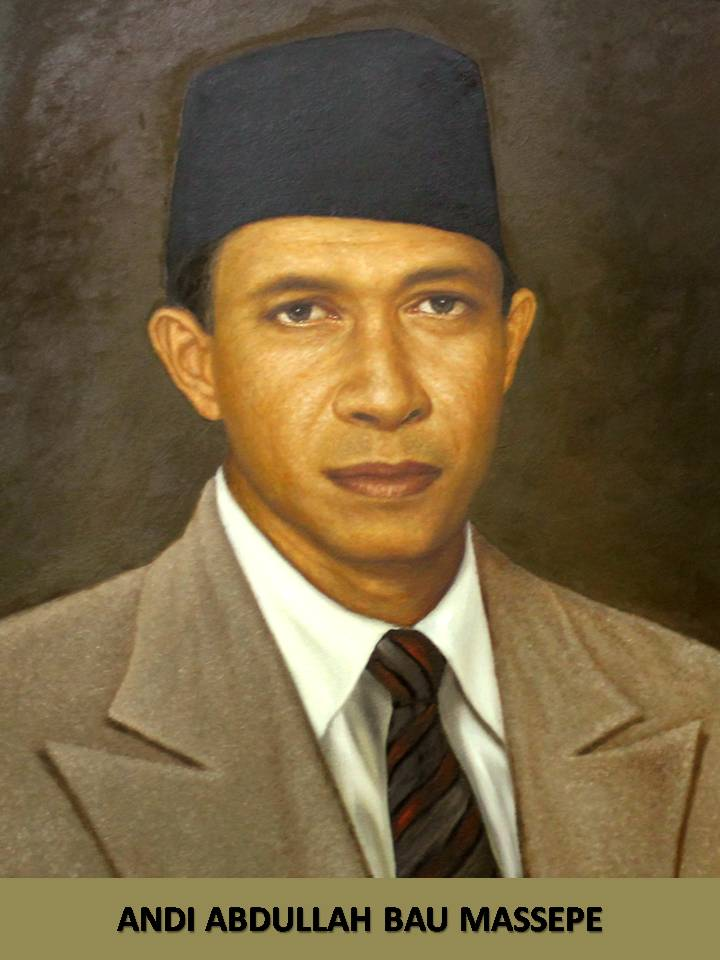
- Bau Massepe painting
- Born: 1918; Massepe, Sidenreng Rappang, Dutch East Indies
- Died: 2 February 1947 (aged 28–29); Suppa, Pinrang, Sulawesi
- Burial place: Parepare, Indonesia
- Military career
- Allegiance: Indonesia (1945–1947)
- Branch: Indonesian Army
- Service years: 1945-1947
- Rank: Major General (at death); Lieutenant General (posthumously)
- Unit: TRI Hasanuddin Division I
- Conflicts: Indonesian National Revolution: South Sulawesi campaign
- Awards: National Hero of Indonesia

25th Datu of Suppa
- Reign: 1938–1947
- Predecessor: Andi Makkasau
- Successor: I Sodji Datu Kanjenne
- Spouse: Andi Maccaya; Linge Daeng Singara; Andi Sodji Petta Kanjenne
- Issue: Andi Habibah; Andi Ibrahim; Andi Subaedah Besse Te’ne; Bau Kuneng; Bau Amessangeng; Bau Dala Uleng; Bau Fatimah
- Father: Andi Mappanyukki
- Mother: Besse Arung Bulo

Andi Abdullah Bau Massepe (1918 – 2 February 1947) was an Indonesian nobleman of Bugis descent who initiated attacks against Dutch forces during the National Revolution. He was the son of Andi Mappanyukki. On 9 November 2005, he was conferred the title of National Hero of Indonesia posthumously.

== Early life ==
Andi Abdullah Bau Massepe was born in 1918. His father was rebel warrior Andi Mappanyukki. Massepe had one brother named Andi Pangerang Petta Rani. He started formal education from Schakel School in 1924 for one year. Afterward he continued his education in Hollands Inslander School (HIS) and finished his education in 1932. At a young age, Massepe was already Datu Suppa (ruler of Suppa) but also Alitta, Sidenreng, Rappang, and Sawito. He was the heir of Sultanate of Gowa and Bone state.

== Independence struggle ==
He was a member of the political organization Sudara (Sumber Darah Rakyat). An organisation formed by Andi Mappanyukki and Sam Ratulangi who was at the time advisor 2nd South Fleet of the Imperial Japanese Navy military government for East Indonesia, alongside Arung Tomarilaleng Bone, Opu Tomarilaleng Palopo, Arung Enrekang. Bau Massepe would lead the branch in Parepare. In September 1945, Bau Massepe used his authority as Datu Suppa and Bunken Kanrikan, changed Sudara to Badan Penunjang Republik Indonesia (lit. Support Agency for the Republic of Indonesia) with him being the chairman. This organization is formed to support and defend the proclamation of independence. In Parepare with the support of Sam Ratulangi, the organization Komite Nasional Indonesia (KNI) transformed to PKRS, Pusat Keamanan Rakyat Sementara (lit. Temporary Center for People's Safety) under Massepe. This organization stockpiled weapons, bought and stole Japanese weapons, organize plans, and sabotage Dutch roads. Other militia organisation he would form include Pemuda/Pandu Nasional Indonesia (PNI) and Lasykar BP. Ganggawa.

Anti-Dutch riots erupted especially after Proclamation of Indonesian Independence. Situations in Makassar got more heated on 2 October 1945, when a Dutch forces shot people with red and white badge, retaliatory attacks happened for three days afterward. Orders were restored after gentlement agreement between Brig. Gen. Ivan Dougherty and Gov. Sam Ratulangi. However situation in Makassar inspired similar movements in Parepare and Suppa, Bau Massepe alongside BPRI and Pemuda/Pandu Nasional Indonesia (PNI) hold daily meetings to counter allied forces. On 15 October 1945, a meeting was held between all kings of South Sulawesi in Jongaya led by King of Bone, Andi Mappanyukki, that resulted in a pledge to support of republican government under Gov. Sam Ratulangi and reject Dutch authority. This pledge was then delivered in person by Andi Mappanyukki to allied leadership of Brig. Gen. Ivan Dougherty with NICA representative Major Wagner present. On 20 October Bau Massepe forces was involved in a battle with KNIL in Padang Loangnge'. On 22 October 1945, another meeting between kings in Parepare afdeeling held by Bau Massepe, resulted in similar pledge. On 25 October, further contacts were made in Kariango or Pajojoreng. On 21 November 1945 Brig. Chilton issued a notice to shoot dead on the spot for any that have guns, explosives, keris, badik and spear, that infuriated pemuda and civilians resulting in worsening situation. Bau Massepe sent delegations to Yogyakarta, this delegation included Muhammad Saleh Lahade, Andi Mattalatta, Capt. La Nakka, Muhammad Amin and Lanca.

On 28 January 1946, these delegations arrived in Yogyakarta and received by Sukarno, furthermore Massepe also sent pemuda to receive military training and weapons from Java, notable figures include M. Daeng Malewa, Andi Oddang, Andi Sapada Mappangile, Arsyad B., Andi Sapada Wette, Abdullah, and Musa Gani. In January 1946 a battle happened in Bonrongnge', Bau Massepe tried to attack NICA post on 3 February 1946, but failed, another attack happened in Bacukiki, and March 1946 in Polejiwa and Tiroang Pinrang. La Nakka and Muhammad Amin returned to Bau Massepe in April 1946 with provision that Andi Mappanyukki as Colonel, and Sultan Daeng Raja, Andi Pangerang Pettarani, Bau Massepe as Lieutenant Colonel. Further communication from Yogyakarta was received asking Dutch troop numbers and possible landing sites, although Dutch Military Police arrived to BPRI central office to confiscate the letters, Bau Massepe managed to escape with the help of A.J. Binol. According to the letters around 6000 soldiers have finished military training will arrive in waves. In May 1946, Dutch troops would be intercepted in Menuang, Alitta, and further contact would occur in Manggarongkong and Lakessi. In July 1946, a general attack on NICA position in Rappang would be launched, while a battle in Carawali would occur on 26 August 1946. La Nakka was again to be sent from Suppa to Java in August 1946, meanwhile Bau Massepe would stay to coordinate the pemuda in Sulawesi.

In 1946, all year-round multiple attacks on KNIL positions were launched consecutively in Libukang/Kabaena, Uli-Uli Tanae', Langsangenge', Bulu Manggarongkonge', Cappa Galung, Lacori/Alitta, Teppoe'/Alitta, Wae' Sibokorongnge', Bungi Kelapa Dua Butt/Suppa, Toe'/Alitta, Pucue', Inru Kinrue', Labuangnge', Allemeangnge', Lajojoreng, Batu Terpedo, Leppangeng, Bonging-Ponging, Labalakang, Mattiro Sompe, Bau Massepe would intercept the Dutch troops in Lamajakka/Suppa in which the Dutch suffered heavy losses, Teppoe'/Alita, in Lasekko/Suppa Dutch troop would attack civilians in Berpuru, Karabello, Allakarajae', Bau Massepe troops would beat Dutch forces in Garessi/Suppa in which Dutch Major F. La Roy would be killed. He managed to push back Dutch forces in Teppoe Kanango and stole some weapons. Eventually Bau Massepe with Andi Sodji were captured on 17 October 1946. He was brought to Makassar, and imprisoned for 160 days. On 20 January 1947, in Paccekke Conference led by Major Andi Mattalatta, TRI Hassanuddin Division I would be formalised, and Bau Massepe would be the commander in absentia with the rank Major General.

== Imprisonment and death ==
Bau Massepe would be imprisoned in Dutch barrack in Mariso-Makassar before moved to barrack in KIS Parepare. According to Andi Sodji Petta Kanjenne, on 23 January 1947, Bau Massepe would be brought to Kariango-Pinrang to witness the execution of his troops there. Another source he alongside Andi Abdul Muis, leader of Tanete, Lahalede, Andi Mappatoba, sullewatang of Suppa and Usman Isa were tortured in Dutch Barrack in KIS Parepare. He was killed by Korps Speciale Troepen under Major Westerling on 2 February 1947. There are many version of his death, according to his grandchildren, Bau Massepe was pulled using a car from Suppa to Pinrang in front of his civilian subjects, because he was still not dead, he was then buried alive (although in other similar version he was shot first). According to Dutch source, on 1 February 1947 during the trip from Majene to Parepare, he asked permission to urinate, which then used the opportunity to attack his guard, hence he was shot by the other guard. In other similar version, he was brought from Majene to Parepare, before trying to flee and hence shot dead. On 19 February 1947, Nadjamuddin Daeng Malewa met with Andi Sodji Kanjenne to notify of Bau Massepe death. Andi Sodji and Andi Habibah met with Westerling in Mattoanging to confirm the circumstance of his death but Westerling denied being present and would tried to stop if he were present, and offered his condolences.

In 1949 after formal transfer of Indonesian sovereignty, using Westerling's map efforts to recover his body were undertaken by his family and his relatives in Pinrang. His body was found in a mass grave in Libukkanne village, 5 km from main road of Pinrang. On 5 August 1950, his burial ceremony was conducted for 2 days in his home, before his body was buried in Heroes' Cemetery (TMP) Pare-Pare.
