= Robert Wolter Mongisidi =

National Hero of Indonesia (1925–1949)

- Born: 14 February 1925; Malalayang, Manado, Dutch East Indies
- Died: 5 September 1949 (aged 24); Makassar, Indonesia
- Burial place: Panaikang Heroes Cemetery, Makassar
- Known for: National Hero of Indonesia

Robert Wolter Mongisidi (14 February 1925 – 5 September 1949) was part of Indonesia's struggle for independence from the Dutch in South Sulawesi.

== Biography ==
Robert was born in Malalayang (now part of Manado) and was the son of Petrus Mongisidi and Lina Suawa. He started his education in 1931 in elementary school (Dutch: Hollands Inlandsche School (HIS)), which was followed by middle school (Dutch: Meer Uitgebreid Lager Onderwijs (MULO)) at Frater Don Bosco in Manado. Mongisidi was then educated as a Japanese language teacher at a school in Tomohon. After his studies, he taught Japanese in Liwutung, in the Minahasa region, and in Luwuk, Central Sulawesi, before making his way to Makassar, South Sulawesi.

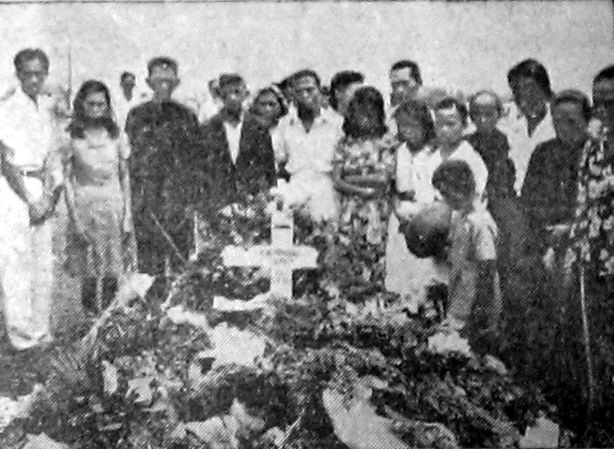
Mongisidi's family surrounding his grave, 1950

Indonesia's independence was proclaimed while Mongisidi was in Makassar. However, the Dutch sought to regain control of Indonesia after the end of World War II. They returned through the Netherlands Indies Civil Administration (NICA). Mongisidi became involved in the struggle against NICA in Makassar. On 17 July 1946, Mongisidi with Ranggong Daeng Romo and others formed the Indonesian People's Rebel Army of Sulawesi (Indonesian: Laskar Pemberontak Rakyat Indonesia Sulawesi (LAPRIS)), which continually harassed and attacked Dutch positions. He was caught by the Dutch on 28 February 1947, but managed to escape on 27 October 1947. The Dutch caught him again and this time sentenced him to death. Mongisidi was executed by firing squad on 5 September 1949. His body was moved to the Makassar heroes cemetery on 10 November 1950.

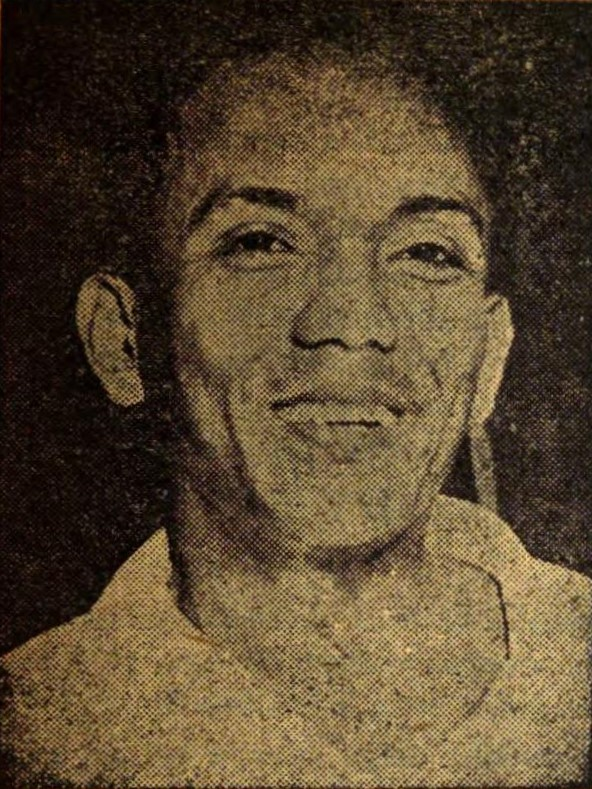
Chris Soumokil, the Minister of Justice of East Indonesia at that time. He gave Mongisidi death sentence and rejected the request for amnesty by his colleagues and family. Soumokil would later face the same fate as Mongisidi, executed by firing squad on 12 March 1966.

== Honors ==
Robert Wolter Mongisidi was posthumously named a national hero (Indonesian: Pahlawan Nasional) by the government of Indonesia on 6 November 1973. He also received the country's highest honor, the Bintang Mahaputra (Adipradana), on 10 November 1973. His then 80-year-old father, Petrus, accepted the honor. The airport in Kendari, South East Sulawesi was formerly named in honor of Mongisidi (it is now named Haluoleo Airport). The Indonesian naval ship KRI Wolter Mongisidi was also named on behalf of Mongisidi.
