= Kajang (Indonesia) =

District in Bulukumba Regency, South Sulawesi, Indonesia

Coordinates: 5°20′S 120°21′E

Kajang or Kadjang is a district in Bulukumba Regency, South Sulawesi, Indonesia. According to the official estimates as at mid 2022, the population was 48,775. Many of the indigenous people retain a pre-Islamic belief system though some practice a syncretic form of Islam.
