= Bulukumba Regency =

Regency in South Sulawesi, Indonesia

Coordinates: 5°33′S 120°11′E

Bulukumba Regency Kabupaten Bulukumba
- Regency

Other transcription(s)
  - Buginese: ᨀᨅᨘᨄᨈᨛ ᨅᨘᨒᨘᨀᨘᨅ
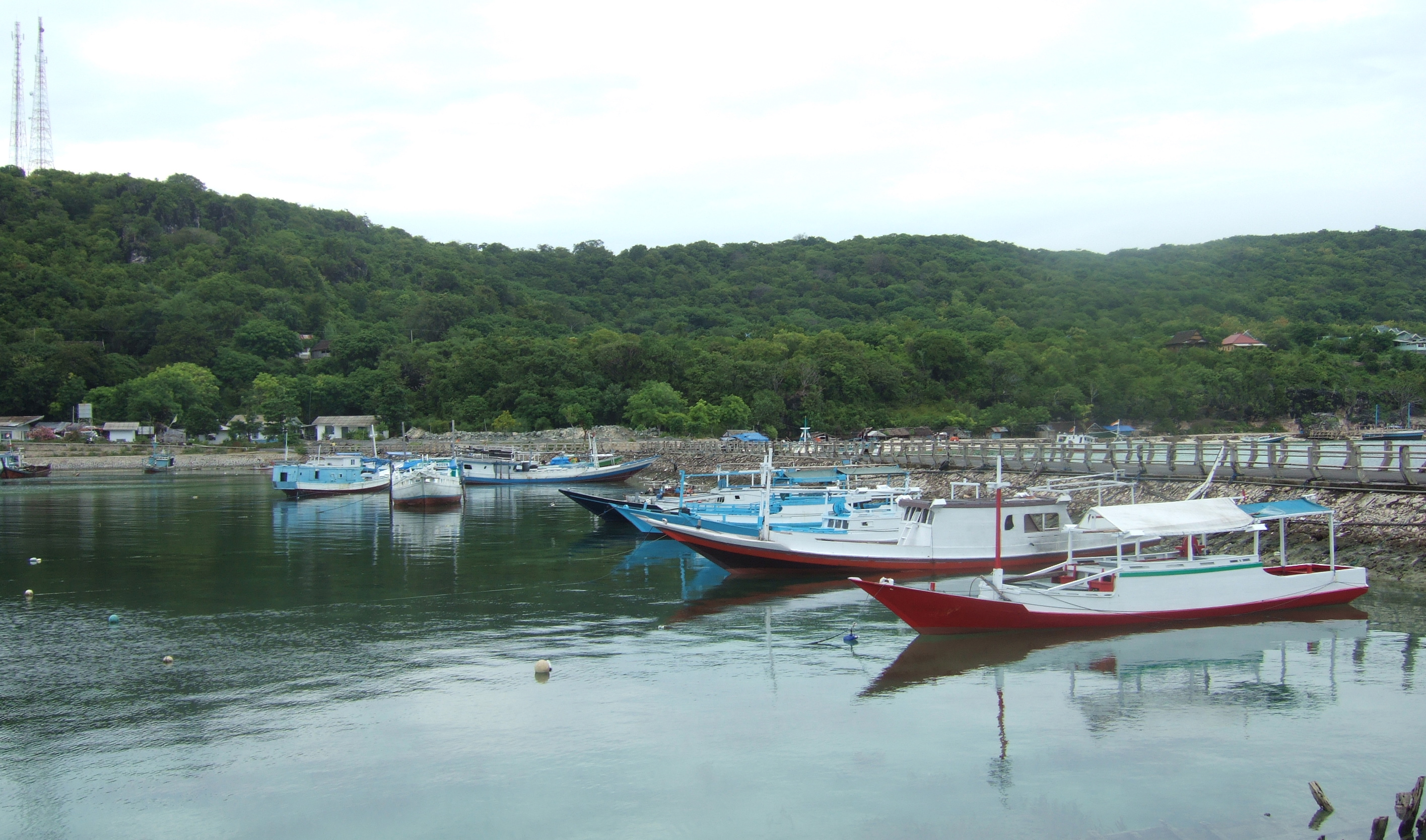
- Port of Bira Bulukumba, South Sulawesi

- Coat of arms

- Location within South Sulawesi
- Country: Indonesia
- Province: South Sulawesi
- Capital: Ujung Bulu

Government
  - Regent: Andi Muchtar Ali Yusuf
  - Vice Regent: Andi Edy Manaf

Area
  - Total: 1,175.53 km^{2} (453.87 sq mi)

Population (mid 2025 estimate)
  - Total: 485,008
  - Density: 412.587/km^{2} (1,068.59/sq mi)
- Time zone: UTC+8 (WITA)
- Area code: +62 413
- Website: www.bulukumbakab.go.id

Bulukumba Regency is a regency in the southeast corner of South Sulawesi Province, Indonesia. It covers an area of 1,175.53 km^{2}, and had a population of 394,757 at the 2010 Census and 437,607 at the 2020 Census; the official estimate for mid 2025 was 485,008 (including 237,335 males and 247,673 females). The town of Ujung Bulu is its capital.

== Administrative districts ==
Bulukumba Regency is divided into ten Districts (Kecamatan), tabulated below with their areas and their populations at the 2010 Census and 2020 Census, together with the official estimates for mid 2025. The table also includes the locations of the district administrative centres, the number of villages in each district (totaling 109 rural desa and 27 urban kelurahan), and its postal code.

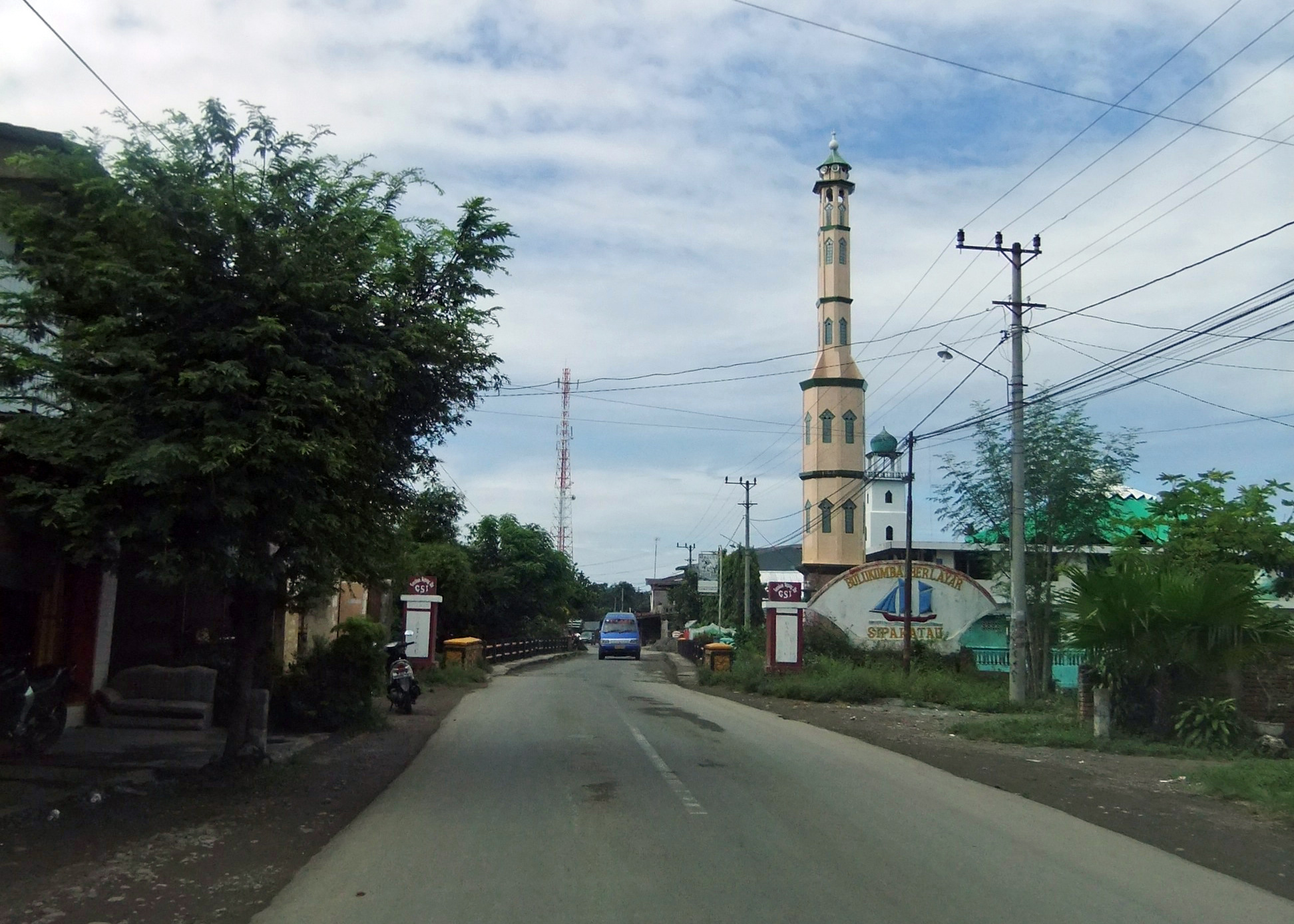
Bulukumba Regency

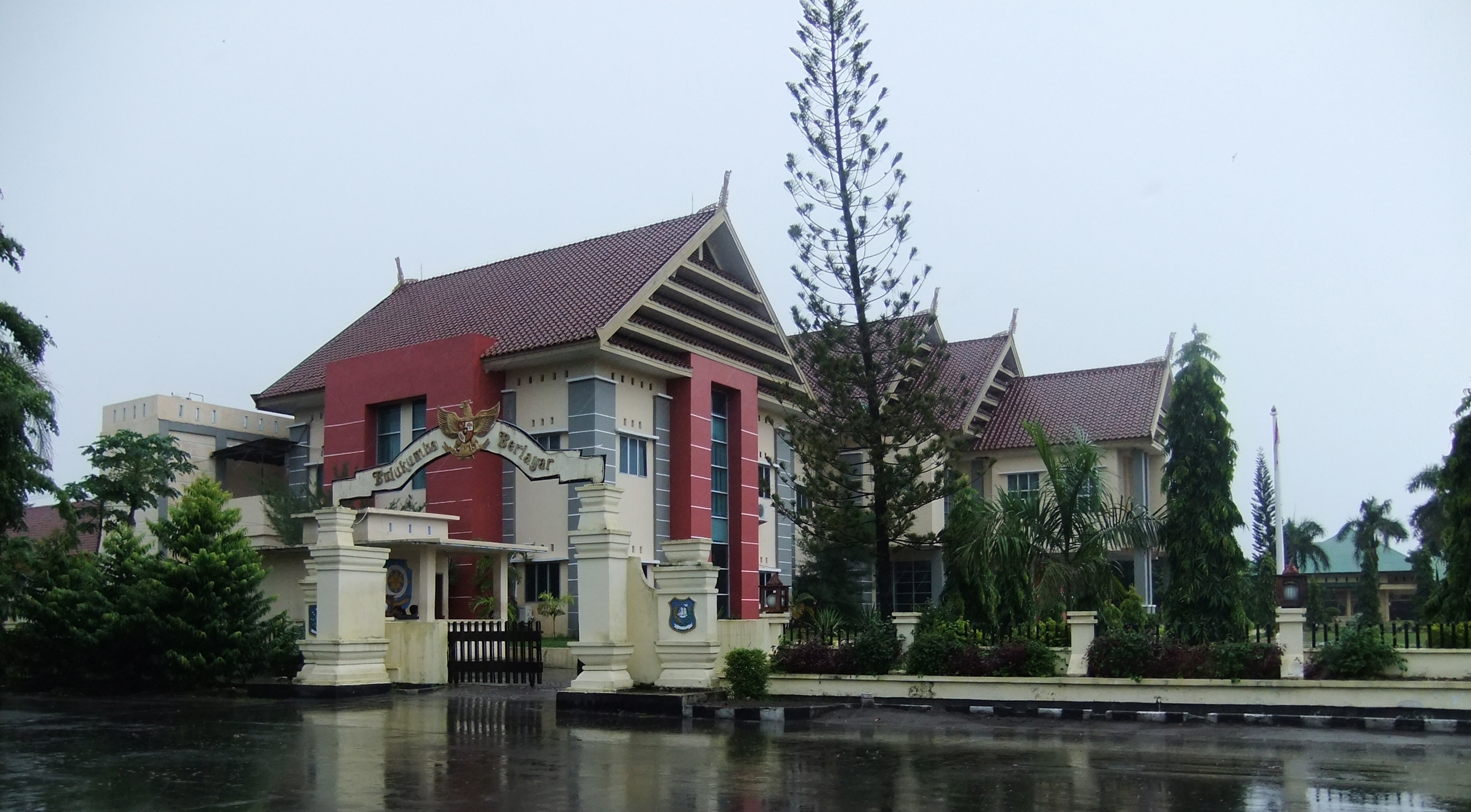
Office of Bulukumba Regent

Kode Wilayah	Name in District (kecamatan)	Area in km^{2}	Pop'n Census 2010	Pop'n Census 2020	Pop'n Estimate mid 2025	Admin centre	No. of villages	Post code
73.02.01	Gantarang	175.84	71,307	81,173	91,061	Ponre	21 ^{(a)}	92561
73.02.02	Ujung Bulu (town)	14.63	47,886	49,060	52,722	Terang-Terang	9 ^{(b)}	92511 ^{(c)}
73.02.09	Ujung Loe	146.25	39,233	46,750	52,283	Dannuang	13 ^{(d)}	92562
73.02.03	Bonto Bahari ^{(e)}	115.51	24,116	28,255	31,843	Tanah Lemo	8 ^{(f)}	92571
73.02.04	Bontotiro	79.39	22,768	26,920	30,014	Ekatiro	13 ^{(d)}	92572
73.02.05	Hero Lange-Lange (or 'Herlang')	69.71	24,041	27,931	31,104	Tanuntung	8 ^{(g)}	92573
73.02.06	Kajang	130.79	46,983	48,628	54,731	Kassi	19 ^{(h)}	92574
73.02.07	Bulukumpa	173.63	50,607	54,087	57,633	Tanete	17 ^{(j)}	92552
73.02.10	Rilau Ale	119.11	37,871	42,188	47,225	Palampang	15 ^{(d)}	92553
73.02.08	Kindang	150.67	29,748	32,615	36.392	Borong Rapooa	13 ^{(d)}	92517
	Totals	1,175.53	394,757	437,607	485,008	Ujung Bulu	136	

Note: (a) including 3 kelurahan - Jalanjang, Mario Rennu and Matekko. (b) all 9 are kelurahan - Bentengnge, Bintarore, Caile, Ela-Ela, Kalumeme, Kasimpureng, Loka, Tanah Kongkong and Terang-Terang.
(c) except for the kelurahan of Tanah Kongkong (whose postcode is 92513), Bintarore (92514), Caile (92517) and Kalumeme (92518).
(d) including one kelurahan - the district admin centre as named. (e) including the offshore island of Pulau Liukangloe, south of Tanjung Bira, the mosr southeastern point of South Sulawesi province.
(f) including 4 kelurahan - Benjala, Sapo Lohe, Tanah Beru and Tanah Lemo. (g) including 2 kelurahan - Bonto Kamase and Tanuntung.
(h) including 2 kelurahan - Laikang and Tanah Jaya. (j) including 3 kelurahan - Balla Saraja, Jawijawi and Tanete.

== Pinisi ships ==
The traditional wooden Pinisi ships are built in Bulukumba, e.g. in Lemo-lemo village.

== Climate ==
Bulukumba has a tropical monsoon climate (Am) with moderate to little rainfall from August to November and heavy rainfall from December to July. The following climate data is for the town of Bulukumba.

Climate data for Bulukumba
Month	Jan	Feb	Mar	Apr	May	Jun	Jul	Aug	Sep	Oct	Nov	Dec	Year
Mean daily maximum °C (°F)	30.0 (86.0)	30.0 (86.0)	30.4 (86.7)	31.0 (87.8)	31.2 (88.2)	30.8 (87.4)	30.9 (87.6)	31.5 (88.7)	32.0 (89.6)	32.3 (90.1)	31.5 (88.7)	30.3 (86.5)	31.0 (87.8)
Daily mean °C (°F)	26.4 (79.5)	26.5 (79.7)	26.6 (79.9)	26.8 (80.2)	26.9 (80.4)	26.2 (79.2)	25.8 (78.4)	25.9 (78.6)	26.5 (79.7)	27.1 (80.8)	27.2 (81.0)	26.6 (79.9)	26.5 (79.8)
Mean daily minimum °C (°F)	22.8 (73.0)	23.0 (73.4)	22.8 (73.0)	22.7 (72.9)	22.6 (72.7)	21.7 (71.1)	20.7 (69.3)	20.4 (68.7)	21.0 (69.8)	21.9 (71.4)	22.9 (73.2)	22.9 (73.2)	22.1 (71.8)
Average rainfall mm (inches)	166 (6.5)	138 (5.4)	152 (6.0)	198 (7.8)	305 (12.0)	271 (10.7)	153 (6.0)	59 (2.3)	32 (1.3)	61 (2.4)	92 (3.6)	148 (5.8)	1,775 (69.8)
Source: Climate-Data.org

== Tourism ==
Bulukumba has many beach tourist destinations such as

- Tanjung Bira Beach
- Apparalang Beach
- Panrang Luhu Beach
- Marumasa Beach
- Kasuso Beach
- Mandala Ria Beach
- Bara Beach
- Liukang Loe Island Beach
- Lemo-lemo Beach
- Samboang Beach
- Kambing Island Beach
- Ujung Tiro Beach
- Kaluku Beach
- Pusahelu Beach
